= Kyle Farmer =

American baseball player (born 1990)

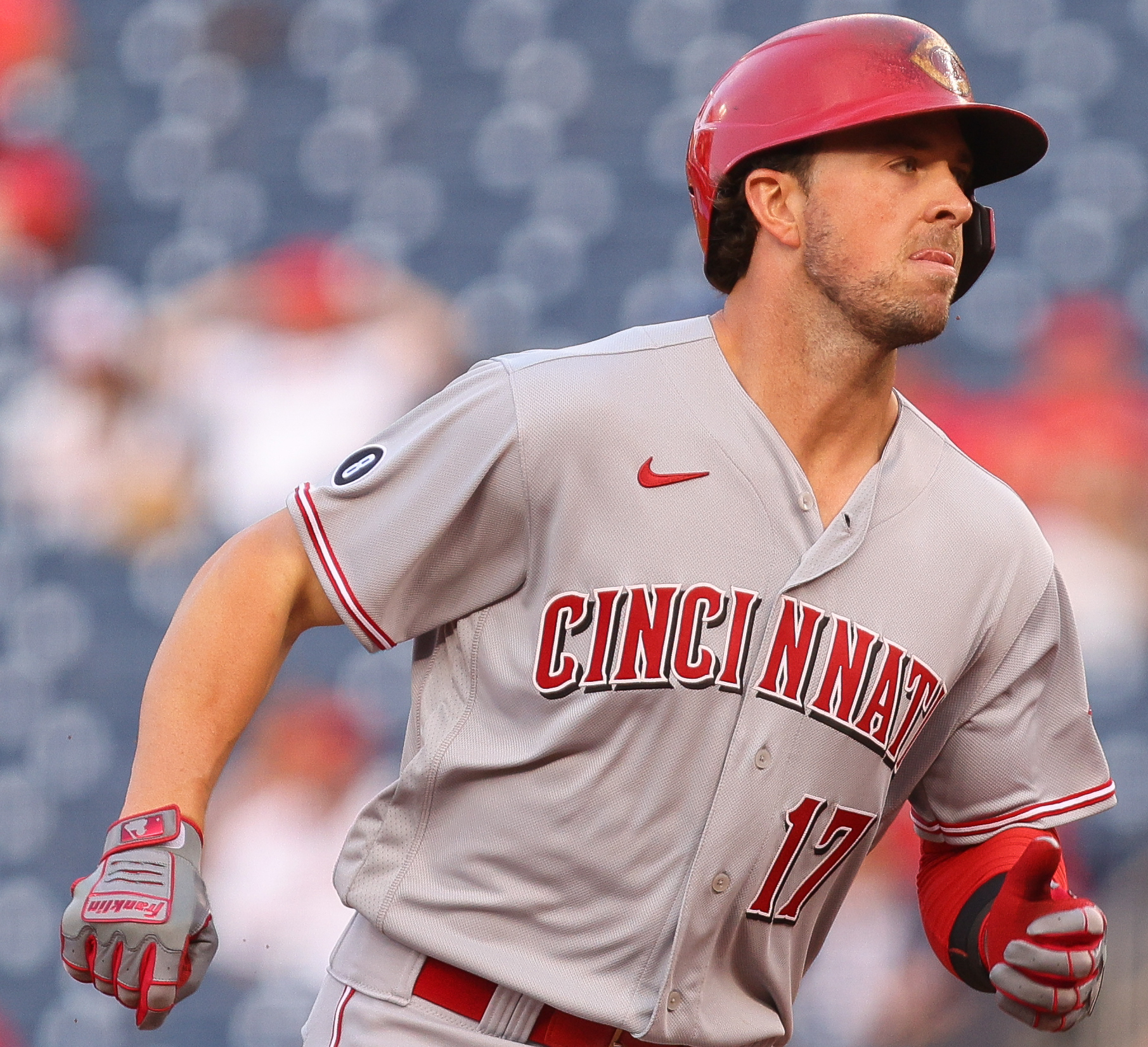
- Farmer with the Cincinnati Reds in 2021

Free agent
- Infielder
- Born: August 17, 1990 (age 36); Atlanta, Georgia, U.S.
- Bats: Right Throws: Right

MLB debut
- July 30, 2017, for the Los Angeles Dodgers

MLB statistics (through 2026 season)
- Batting average: .247
- Home runs: 63
- Runs batted in: 288
- Stats at Baseball Reference

Teams
- Los Angeles Dodgers (2017–2018); Cincinnati Reds (2019–2022); Minnesota Twins (2023–2024); Colorado Rockies (2025); Atlanta Braves (2026)
Medals
Men's baseball
Representing the United States
Haarlem Baseball Week
Bronze medal – third place	2012	Team

James Kyle Farmer (born August 17, 1990) is an American professional baseball infielder who is a free agent. He has previously played in Major League Baseball (MLB) for the Los Angeles Dodgers, Cincinnati Reds, Minnesota Twins, Colorado Rockies, and Atlanta Braves. The Dodgers selected him in the 2013 MLB draft, and he made his MLB debut with them in 2017.

== Amateur career ==
Farmer graduated from the Marist School in Atlanta, Georgia, where he played high school baseball and football. While at Marist, Farmer appeared in the film The Blind Side (2009) as a high school quarterback.

During his college baseball career at the University of Georgia, Farmer played shortstop, hitting for a .308 batting average and recording a .968 fielding percentage, a Bulldogs team record for a shortstop. In 2011, he played collegiate summer baseball with the Bourne Braves of the Cape Cod Baseball League. The New York Yankees selected him in the 35th round of the 2012 Major League Baseball (MLB) draft, but he did not sign. He was then drafted by the Los Angeles Dodgers in the 8th round (244th overall pick) of the 2013 MLB draft, and he signed with the team.

== Professional career ==
=== Los Angeles Dodgers ===
==== Minor leagues ====
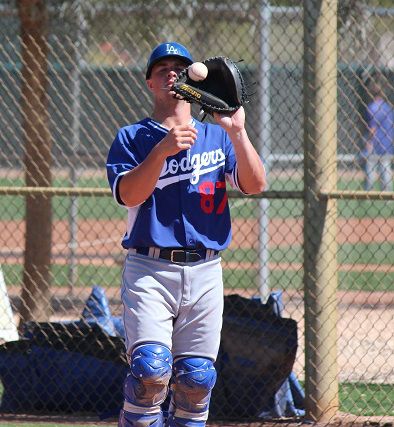
Farmer with the Los Angeles Dodgers in 2014

The Dodgers made the decision to convert Farmer into a catcher. In 2014, he made his pro baseball debut with the rookie-level Ogden Raptors of the Pioneer League, then was promoted to the Great Lakes Loons of the Midwest League later that year. After 57 games with Great Lakes – where he hit .310 – Farmer was promoted again to the Rancho Cucamonga Quakes of the California League, where he batted .238 in 36 games.

Farmer began 2015 with the Quakes, where he was selected to the mid-season All-Star team. He did not play in the game due to his subsequent promotion to the Double-A Tulsa Drillers of the Texas League. Farmer was selected to the All-Star Futures Game, in 2015. He played in 76 games for Tulsa and hit .272. Farmer returned to Tulsa to start the 2016 season and was selected to the mid-season all-star game. He played in 74 games for the Drillers in 2016, hitting .256 with five home runs and 31 runs batted in (RBI). He dealt with injuries to his right wrist and a right toe. The Dodgers added Farmer to their 40-man roster after the season. He was promoted to the Triple-A Oklahoma City Dodgers during the 2017 season.

==== Major leagues ====
Farmer was first called up to the big leagues on July 28, 2017. Two days later, in his first major league at bat, Farmer hit a walk-off two-run double off Albert Suárez of the San Francisco Giants, in the bottom of the 11th inning, giving the Dodgers a 3–2 win. Farmer appeared in 20 games for the Dodgers in 2017, primarily as a pinch hitter, and had six hits in 20 at-bats (.300). He made the Dodgers roster for the National League (NL) Division Series and NL Championship Series, going 0-for-4 as a pinch hitter.

In 2018, Farmer appeared in 24 games in the field for the Dodgers, 22 of them at third base. He posted a slash line of .235/.312/.324 in 68 at bats.

=== Cincinnati Reds ===
On December 21, 2018, the Dodgers traded Farmer to the Cincinnati Reds, along with Yasiel Puig, Alex Wood, Matt Kemp, and cash considerations in exchange for Homer Bailey, Jeter Downs, and Josiah Gray.

In 2019, Farmer hit .230 with 9 home runs and 27 RBIs in 97 games. In the shortened 2020 season, he hit .266 in 32 games. On December 2, Farmer was non-tendered by the Reds and re-signed on a one-year contract. In 2021, Farmer played in his first full season, hitting .263/.316/.416 with 16 home runs and 63 RBIs in 147 games. He set franchise records for highest fielding percentage and fewest errors by a shortstop.

On April 27, 2022 Farmer hit 4 doubles, tied for the most in a nine-inning MLB game. Shortly thereafter, he had an 0-for-34 streak, the longest streak by a Reds position player since 1954. Farmer ended that streak on May 11 with a three-run home run against the Milwaukee Brewers. On August 5, manager David Bell announced that Farmer would be the starting third baseman moving forward, with José Barrero starting at shortstop. The move ended Farmer's streak of 192 consecutive starts at shortstop. He received the team's most valuable player and "good guy" awards from local baseball writers.

=== Minnesota Twins ===
On November 18, 2022, Farmer was traded to the Minnesota Twins in exchange for pitcher Casey Legumina.

On January 13, 2023, Farmer agreed to a one-year, $5.5 million contract with the Twins, avoiding salary arbitration. Farmer hit a walk-off single against the Houston Astros during the Target Field home opener on April 7. He required dental surgery after being hit in the face by a Lucas Giolito pitch on April 12. The Twins subsequently placed him on the ten-day injured list. In 120 games, he slashed .256/.317/.408 with 11 home runs and 46 RBI.

Farmer made 107 appearances for Minnesota in 2024, batting .214/.293/.353 with five home runs and 25 RBI. The Twins declined their half of a 2025 mutual option on October 31, making him a free agent.

=== Colorado Rockies ===
On November 23, 2024, Farmer signed a one-year, $3.25 million contract with the Colorado Rockies, including a mutual option for the 2026 season. He made 97 appearances for the Rockies, slashing .227/.280/.365 with eight home runs and 31 RBI. On November 4, the Rockies declined their side of the mutual option for 2026, making him a free agent.

=== Atlanta Braves ===
On February 6, 2026, Farmer signed a minor league contract with the Atlanta Braves. On March 21, the Braves signed Farmer to a split major league contract. In 12 games with Atlanta, he slashed .267/.250/.333 with three RBI. On July 21, Farmer was released by the Braves. On July 27, he re-signed with Atlanta on a minor league contract. Farmer made 31 appearances split between the Double–A Columbus Clingstones and Triple–A Gwinnett Stripers, batting a cumulative .227/.289/.255 with one home run and 10 RBI. On September 1, the Braves added Farmer back to their active roster.

== Personal life ==
Farmer proposed to his girlfriend in July 2017, and they married in 2018. They reside in Atlanta and have two sons.

Farmer grew up a fan of the Atlanta Braves. Charlie Leibrandt was his high school pitching coach.
