= Kenta Maeda =

Japanese baseball player (born 1988)

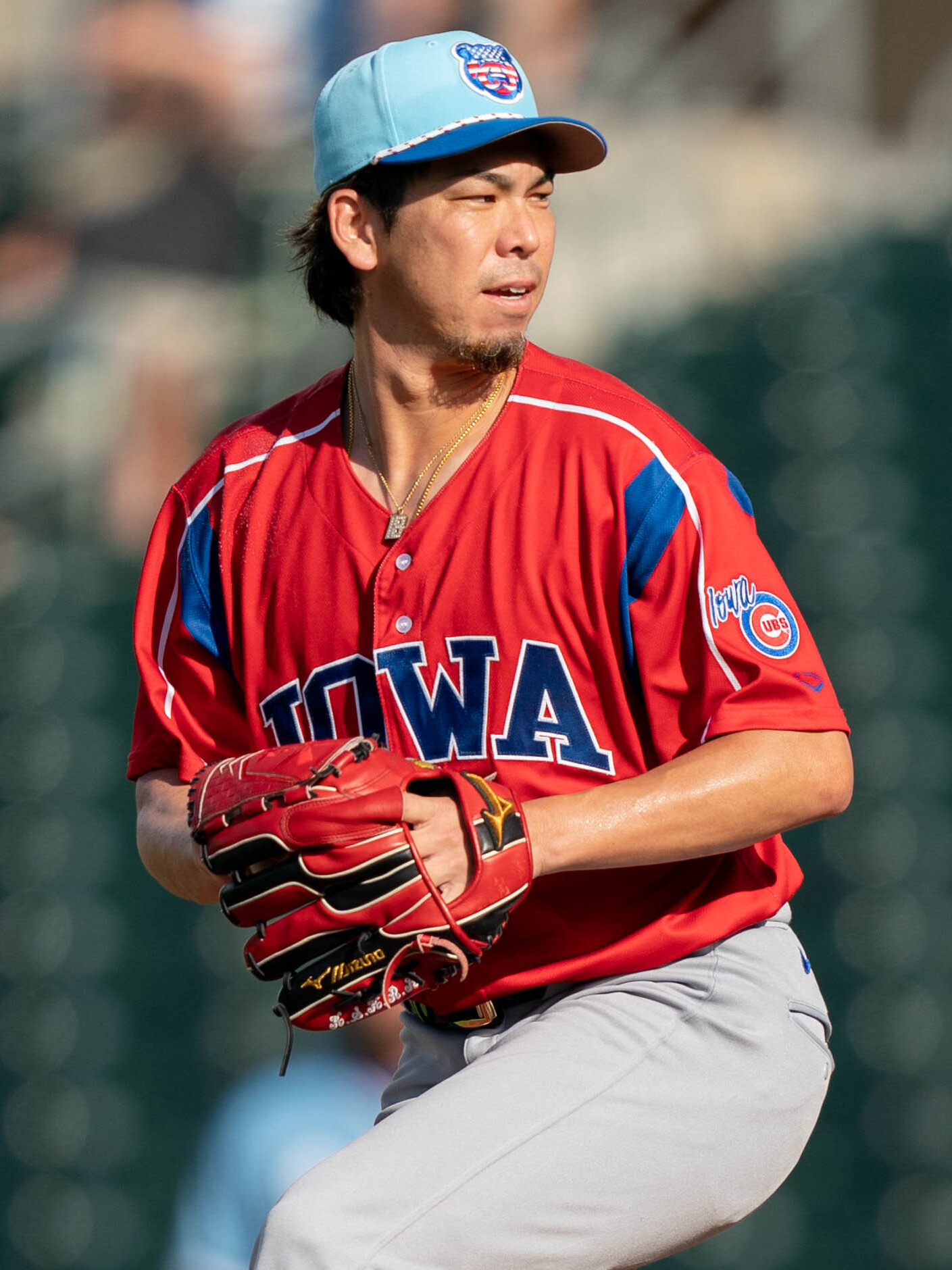
- Maeda with the Iowa Cubs in 2025

Tohoku Rakuten Golden Eagles – No. 18
- Pitcher
- Born: April 11, 1988 (age 38); Tadaoka, Osaka, Japan
- Bats: Right Throws: Right

Professional debut
- NPB: April 5, 2008, for the Hiroshima Toyo Carp
- MLB: April 6, 2016, for the Los Angeles Dodgers

NPB statistics (through August 21, 2026)
- Win–loss record: 100–71
- Earned run average: 2.40
- Strikeouts: 1,276

MLB statistics (through 2025 season)
- Win–loss record: 68–56
- Earned run average: 4.20
- Strikeouts: 1,055
- Stats at Baseball Reference

Teams
- Hiroshima Toyo Carp (2008–2015); Los Angeles Dodgers (2016–2019); Minnesota Twins (2020–2021, 2023); Detroit Tigers (2024–2025); Tohoku Rakuten Golden Eagles (2026–present)

Career highlights and awards
- NPB: Japanese Triple Crown (2010); 5× NPB All-Star (2010, 2012–2015); 3× Best Nine Award (2010, 2013, 2015); 5× Mitsui Golden Glove Award (2010, 2012–2015); 2× Eiji Sawamura Award (2010, 2015); 2× Central League wins champion (2010, 2015); 3× Central League ERA champion (2010, 2012, 2013); 2× Central League strikeout champion (2010, 2011); NPB All-Star Game MVP (2012 Game 2)
Medals
Men's baseball
Representing Japan
WBSC Premier12
Bronze medal – third place	2015 Tokyo	Team

Kenta Maeda (前田 健太, Maeda Kenta; born April 11, 1988) is a Japanese professional baseball pitcher for the Tohoku Rakuten Golden Eagles of Nippon Professional Baseball (NPB). He has previously played in Major League Baseball (MLB) for the Los Angeles Dodgers, Minnesota Twins, and Detroit Tigers, and in NPB for the Hiroshima Toyo Carp.

Maeda debuted with the Carp in 2008. He won the Eiji Sawamura Award in 2010 and 2015. After the 2015 season, the Carp posted Maeda to MLB and he signed an eight-year contract with the Dodgers. The Dodgers traded Maeda to the Twins before the 2020 season, and he signed a two-year contract with the Tigers before the 2024 season. After struggling in his first season, Detroit released him in May 2025.

== Professional career ==
=== Hiroshima Toyo Carp ===
The Hiroshima Toyo Carp of Nippon Professional Baseball (NPB) selected Maeda out of PL Gakuen Senior High School in the 2006 NPB draft. He played in 2007 for the Carp's secondary team, before being called up to the NPB team in 2008.

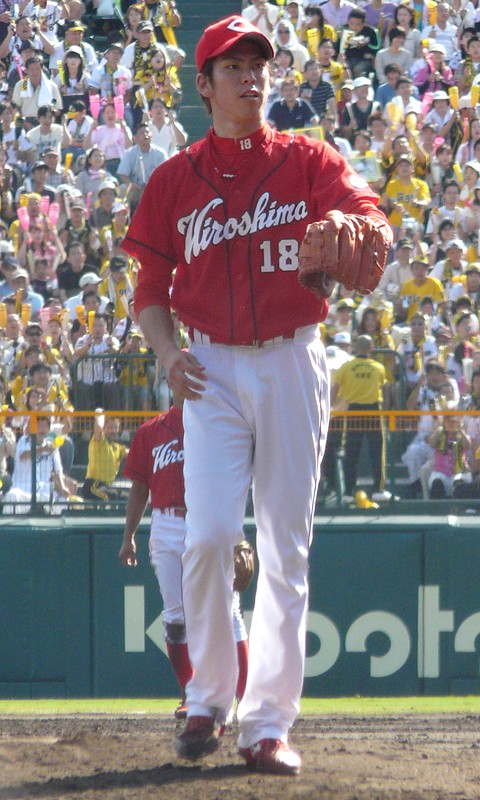
Maeda with the Carp

In his rookie season of 2008, Maeda posted a 9–2 win–loss record with a 3.20 earned run average (ERA) in 19 games (18 starts). In 2009, he was 8–14 with a 3.36 ERA in 29 starts. In 2010, he performed even better with a 15–8 record, a 2.21 ERA, and 174 strikeouts in 28 starts. In 2011, his record was 10–12 while having a 2.46 ERA and 178 strikeouts in 31 starts. The 2012 season became far better for Maeda as his record was 14–7 with a 1.53 ERA in 29 starts. In 2013, his record was 15–7 with a 2.10 ERA in 26 starts. In 2014, he went 11–9 with a 2.60 ERA in 27 starts. In 2015, he went 15–8 with a 2.09 ERA in 29 starts.

Maeda won the Sawamura Award as the league's best pitcher in both 2010 and 2015 and was the youngest pitcher in Japanese baseball history to achieve the pitching Triple Crown. The Carp chose to make him available to Major League Baseball (MLB) teams through the posting system in December 2015.

=== Los Angeles Dodgers ===
On January 7, 2016, Maeda signed an eight-year, $25 million contract with the Los Angeles Dodgers that included $10 million per year in incentives. The deal would have reached a total of around $90.2 million throughout the course of the contract if he reached all of the incentives, which included annual roster bonus of $150,000 if he was on the 25-man opening-day active roster and $6.5 million annually based on starts: $1 million each for 15 and 20, and $1.5 million apiece for 25, 30 and 32 starts. It also had incentives of $3.5 million annually based on innings pitched: $250,000 for 90 and each additional 10 through 190, and $750,000 for 200. The deal was structured in this manner because Maeda's original physical with the team revealed some unspecified "irregularities." The Dodgers also paid a $20 million posting fee to the Hiroshima Carp.

Maeda picked up the win in his MLB debut on April 6, 2016, pitching six shutout innings against the San Diego Padres at Petco Park. His first major league strikeout was of Padres starter Andrew Cashner in the top of the second inning. He also hit a home run off of Cashner in his second at-bat for his first major league hit. He made a team high 32 starts with a 16–11 record and 3.48 ERA and was selected by Baseball America to their all-rookie team. He made three starts in the post-season for the Dodgers, losing one game in the Division Series and pitching two no-decisions in the Championship Series. He allowed eight runs in 10 2/3 innings. He finished third in the voting for the National League Rookie of the Year Award behind his teammate Corey Seager and Trea Turner of the Washington Nationals.

==== 2017 ====
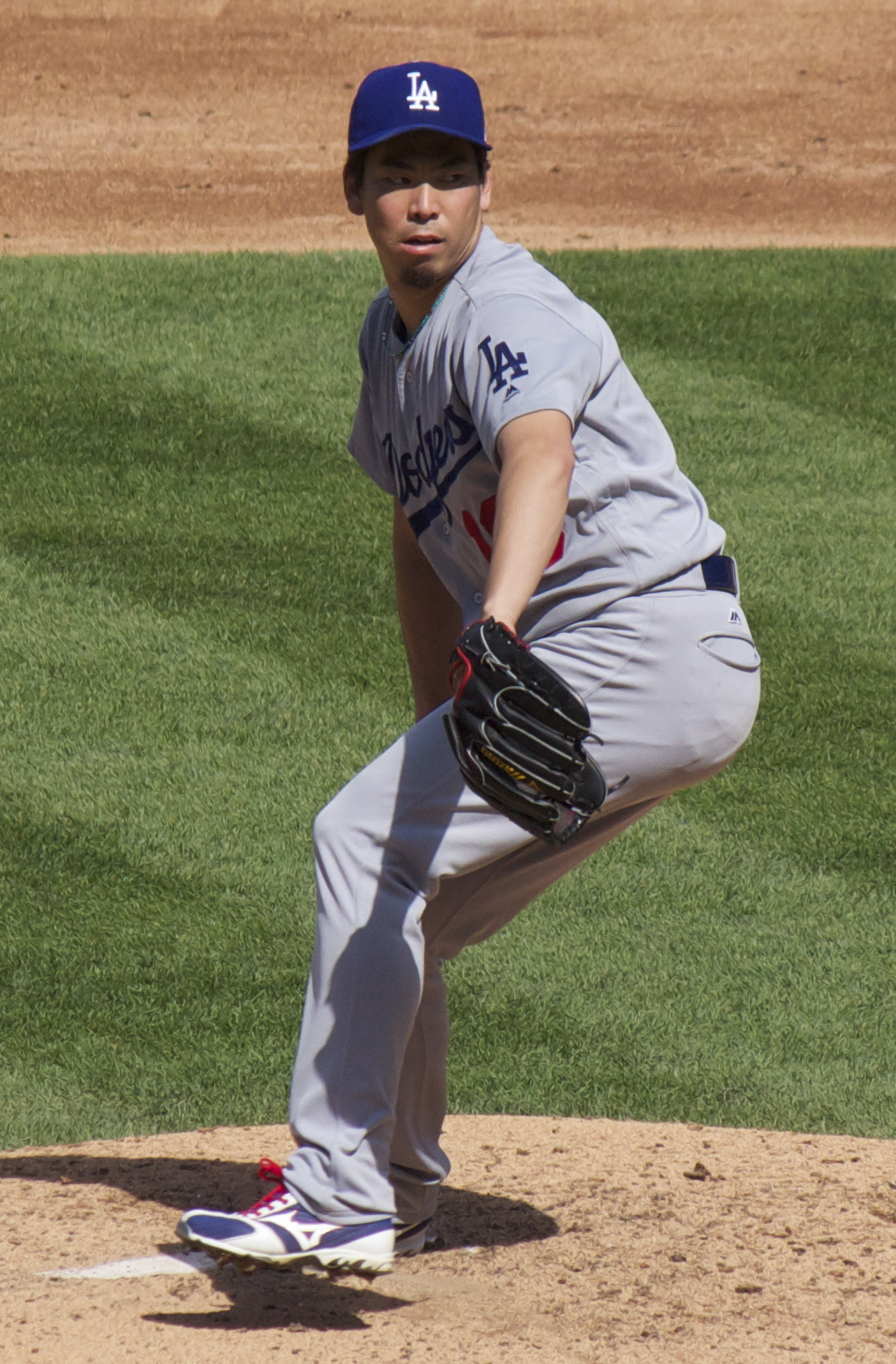
Maeda with the Dodgers in 2017

In 2017, Maeda began the season in the starting rotation but struggled in April and May, with a 5.16 ERA causing him to be taken out of the rotation and tried in relief. He pitched three innings out of the pen on June 9 to pick up his first career save. On June 18 he was back in the rotation and allowed only one run on three hits in five innings but he returned to the bullpen after that game because the Dodgers had too many starting pitchers on the roster. However, he only appeared in one game in relief before returning to the starting rotation and from June 18 through August 25, he had gone 8–2 with a 2.70 ERA as a starter. At the end of the season, the Dodgers moved Maeda back into the bullpen in order to try him in that role for possible use in the playoffs. Overall during the regular season he appeared in 29 games with 25 starts and had a record of 13–6 with a 4.22 ERA. He did make the post-season roster as a relief pitcher. He pitched two scoreless innings with four strikeouts in the NLDS and three scoreless innings in the NLCS. In the World Series, which the Dodgers lost in seven games, Maeda pitched 5 2/3 innings over four games and allowed one run on four hits. Right-handed batters had just four hits in 32 at-bats against him in the post-season.

==== 2018 ====
Maeda began the 2018 season in the starting rotation. He went 6–7, posted a 3.85 ERA, and averaged over 10 strikeouts per nine innings in his 20 starts. On August 14 he returned to the bullpen and made 19 relief appearances, going 2–3 with two saves while posting a 3.57 ERA. He struck out 26 batters and walked only 3 as a reliever. He finished the season 8–10 with 153 strikeouts and an ERA of 3.81 in 125 1/3 innings over 39 games. In the postseason Maeda made eight relief appearances, allowing 3 runs in 6 2/3 innings.

==== 2019 ====
Maeda again began 2019 in the Dodgers starting rotation before transitioning to the bullpen at the end of the season. He made 26 starts (and 11 relief appearances), finishing with a 10–8 record and 4.04 ERA with 169 strikeouts.

=== Minnesota Twins ===
On February 10, 2020, the Dodgers traded Maeda, Jaír Camargo, and cash considerations to the Minnesota Twins for Brusdar Graterol, Luke Raley, and the 67th draft pick in the 2020 MLB draft.

On July 25, 2020, Maeda made his Twins debut. On August 12, he earned his 50th MLB career win.

On August 18, Maeda pitched a no-hitter through 8 innings against the Milwaukee Brewers. He struck out 12 batters (8 consecutively, which was a new Twins record) with 2 walks. The no-hitter was broken by Eric Sogard, the first batter Maeda faced in the top of the 9th inning.

In the 2020 season, he was 6–1 with a 2.70 ERA. He led the major leagues in WHIP (0.750). He finished as the runner-up for the 2020 American League Cy Young Award behind Shane Bieber. In 2021, Maeda went 6–5 with a 4.66 ERA. On September 1, 2021, it was announced that Maeda had undergone Tommy John surgery and would miss the entire 2022 season.

Maeda returned to the Twins rotation to start the 2023 season, only to suffer a setback on April 26 that put him on the injured list until June 23. He finished the season with a 6–8 record, a 4.23 ERA, and 117 strikeouts in 104 1/3 innings.

=== Detroit Tigers ===
On November 28, 2023, Maeda signed a two-year, $24 million, contract with the Detroit Tigers. Maeda struggled to a 7.26 ERA across his first 16 starts, and the Tigers announced he would be moving to the bullpen for the "foreseeable future" on July 11, 2024. He fared better as a reliever, posting a 3.86 ERA in 42 innings. Overall, Maeda finished the worst season of his career with a 3–7 record and 6.09 ERA with 96 strikeouts in 112 1/3 innings pitched across 29 games (17 starts).

Maeda battled for the fifth starter role in spring training of 2025, losing out to Casey Mize. Maeda started the season in the Tigers' bullpen. In seven relief outings for Detroit, he struggled to a 7.88 ERA with eight strikeouts across eight innings pitched. He was designated for assignment by the Tigers on May 1, 2025. Maeda cleared waivers and was released by the team on May 7.

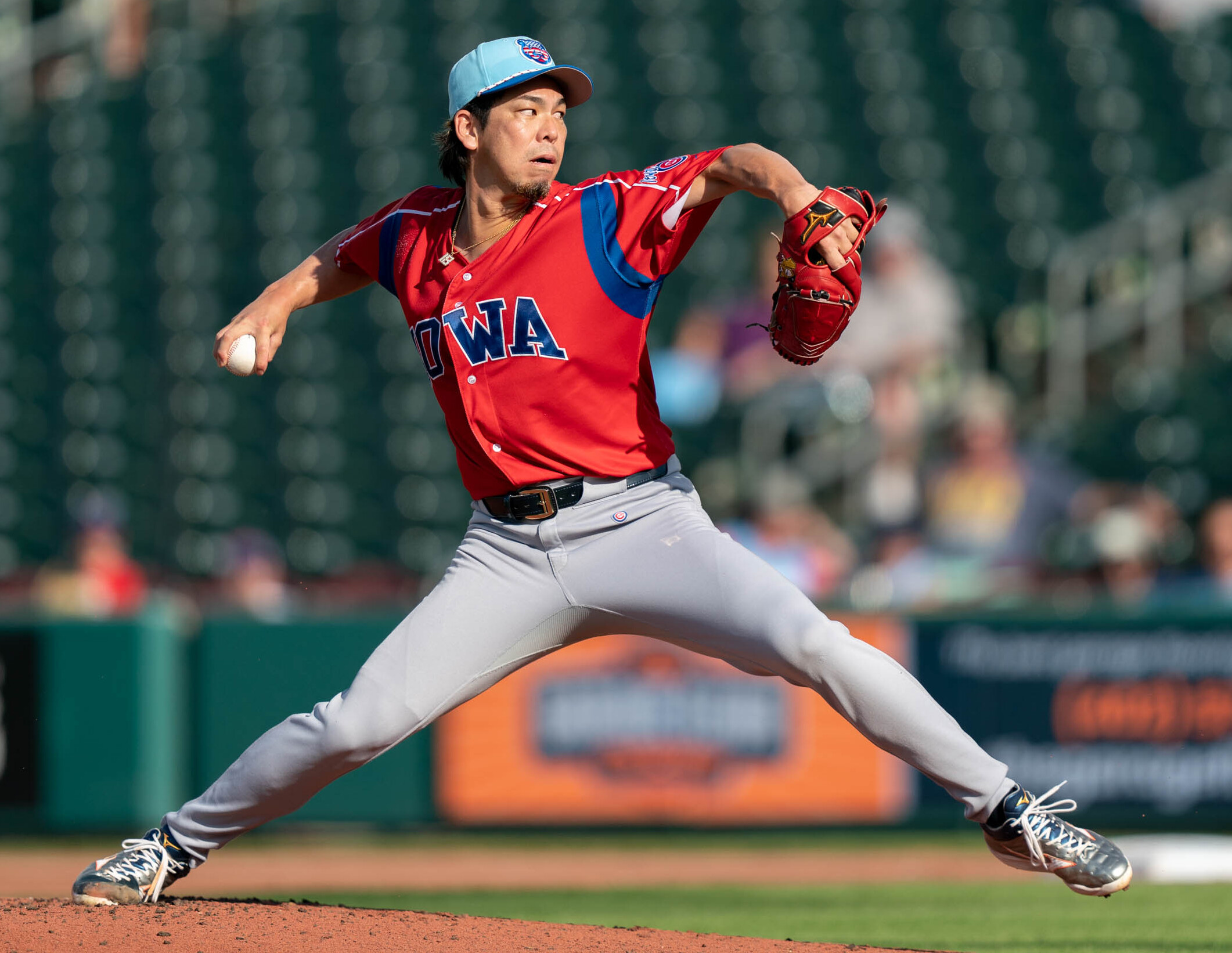
Maeda with the Iowa Cubs in 2025

=== Chicago Cubs ===
On May 16, 2025, Maeda signed a minor league contract with the Chicago Cubs. In 12 starts for the Triple-A Iowa Cubs, he logged a 3–4 record and 5.97 ERA with 45 strikeouts across 57 1/3 innings pitched. Maeda was released by the Cubs organization on August 2.

=== New York Yankees ===
On August 4, 2025, Maeda signed a minor league contract with the New York Yankees organization. He made eight starts for the Triple-A Scranton/Wilkes-Barre RailRiders, posting a 3–3 record and 4.64 ERA with 38 strikeouts across 42 2/3 innings pitched. Maeda elected free agency following the season on November 6.

=== Tohoku Rakuten Golden Eagles ===
On November 25, 2025, Maeda signed a two-year contract with the Tohoku Rakuten Golden Eagles of Nippon Professional Baseball.

== International career ==
Maeda was selected for the Japanese national baseball team at the 2013 World Baseball Classic (WBC), 2014 MLB Japan All-Star Series, and 2015 WBSC Premier12.

In the 2013 WBC, he said he would use the tournament to assess his desire to compete in MLB, based on how he fared against their hitters. Maeda started two games in the pool rounds, against China and the Netherlands, amassing a 2–0 record with 0.00 ERA, 0.30 WHIP, allowing just two hits, one walk striking out 15 in 10 innings. He was the losing pitcher in the semi-finals against Puerto Rico despite only allowing one run in five innings. He was selected to the all-tournament team.

In the 2014 MLB Japan All-Star Series, Maeda pitched five shut out innings. Maeda also pitched in the 2015 WBSC Premier12 tournament, where he allowed two earned runs while striking out 14 in 12 innings. On October 29, 2018, he was selected in the MLB All-Stars at 2018 MLB Japan All-Star Series.

== Pitching style ==
Maeda is a 6 ft 1 in (185 cm), 185 lb (84 kg) right-handed pitcher. He throws from a three-quarters arm slot and his Japanese-style windup features a slight pause at the top of his leg kick. Maeda mixes his pitches well; his four-seam fastball regularly sits in the low 90s, topping out at 96 mph (his two-seam is a tick slower), complementing it with an above-average slider in the low 80s and an above-average changeup.

== Personal life ==
Maeda lives in Tokyo with his wife and their two children. A fan of the reality television show Terrace House since its beginning, Maeda personally asked to be a guest commentator and appeared in episode 45 of Opening New Doors in 2019.

== See also ==
- List of Major League Baseball players from Japan
- List of Nippon Professional Baseball earned run average champions
- List of Nippon Professional Baseball no-hitters
- Los Angeles Dodgers award winners and league leaders
