= Justin Turner =

American baseball player (born 1984)

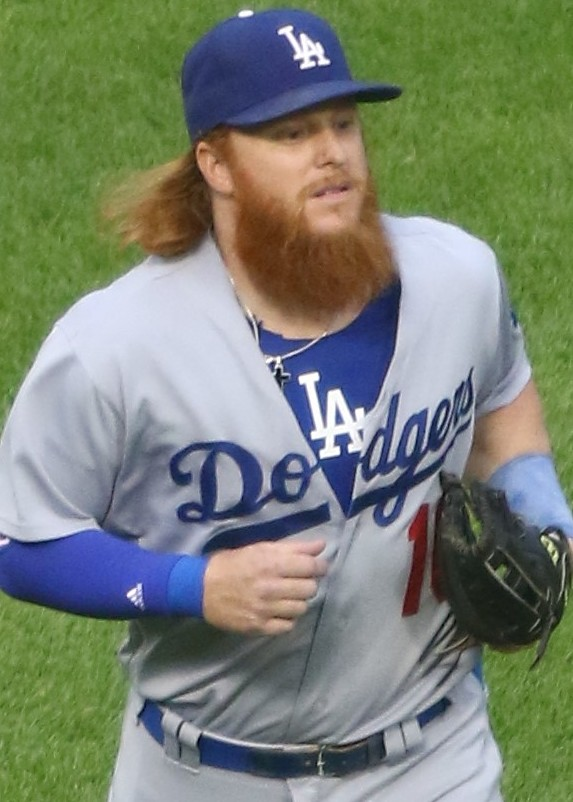
- Turner with the Los Angeles Dodgers in 2017

Toros de Tijuana – No. 10
- Infielder / Designated hitter
- Born: November 23, 1984 (age 41); Long Beach, California, U.S.
- Bats: Right Throws: Right

MLB debut
- September 8, 2009, for the Baltimore Orioles

MLB statistics (through 2025 season)
- Batting average: .283
- Hits: 1,617
- Home runs: 201
- Runs batted in: 832
- Stats at Baseball Reference

Teams
- Baltimore Orioles (2009–2010); New York Mets (2010–2013); Los Angeles Dodgers (2014–2022); Boston Red Sox (2023); Toronto Blue Jays (2024); Seattle Mariners (2024); Chicago Cubs (2025)

Career highlights and awards
- 2× All-Star (2017, 2021); World Series champion (2020); NLCS MVP (2017); Roberto Clemente Award (2022)

Justin Matthew Turner (born November 23, 1984) is an American professional baseball infielder and designated hitter for the Toros de Tijuana of the Mexican League. He has previously played in Major League Baseball (MLB) for the Baltimore Orioles, New York Mets, Los Angeles Dodgers, Boston Red Sox, Toronto Blue Jays, Seattle Mariners, and Chicago Cubs.

Turner played college baseball for the Cal State Fullerton Titans. He was selected in the seventh round of the 2006 MLB draft by the Cincinnati Reds and made his major league debut in 2009 with Baltimore. With the Dodgers, Turner was an All-Star in 2017 and 2021 and won the 2017 National League Championship Series Most Valuable Player Award. He won the 2020 World Series with the Dodgers. He won the Roberto Clemente Award in 2022 for his philanthropic work.

== Early life ==
Justin Turner was born in Long Beach, California, to John and Betsy Turner. He has one younger sister.

Turner attended Mayfair High School in Lakewood, California, earning three-time All-Suburban first-team honors as a shortstop and second baseman.

He attended California State University, Fullerton, where he majored in kinesiology and played college baseball for the Titans. He earned freshman All-American honors from Baseball America in 2003 after quickly taking over as the starting second baseman. He was named to the 2003 College World Series all-tournament team as a shortstop. During the CWS, Turner was hit in the face by a fastball after going 3-for-3 including a home run. The next year, Cal State Fullerton won a two-game final over Texas in the 2004 College World Series.

In 2005, he played collegiate summer baseball in the Cape Cod Baseball League for the Yarmouth-Dennis Red Sox.

Turner was selected in the 29th round of the 2005 Major League Baseball draft by the New York Yankees, although he did not sign.

He was selected in the seventh round (204th overall) of the 2006 Major League Baseball draft by the Cincinnati Reds, receiving a $50,000 bonus upon signing with the organization.

== Professional career ==
=== Cincinnati Reds ===
Turner reported to the Reds' Rookie League affiliate, the Billings Mustangs, where he saw time at all four infield positions and in the outfield, finishing the season with a team-leading .338 batting average and a .921 OPS. He was promoted to Double-A Chattanooga within two years, finishing the 2008 season, at age 23, with a .289 average and a .792 OPS at that level.

=== Baltimore Orioles ===
On December 9, 2008, during the Winter Meetings, Turner was traded, along with utility player Ryan Freel and infielder Brandon Waring to the Baltimore Orioles, in return for catcher Ramón Hernández. He was invited to spring training as a non-roster invitee; upon its conclusion, he was assigned to Triple-A Norfolk for the 2009 season. Playing mostly second and third base, he finished the year with a .300 average and a .749 OPS.

The Orioles purchased Turner's contract on September 8, 2009. He made his major league debut that day at Fenway Park, pinch hitting for Melvin Mora and finishing the game at third base. Turner got his first major league hit at Yankee Stadium, a single to center field off Michael Dunn. He finished the season batting 3-for-18, having appeared in 12 games, with three starts at third base.

Turner was invited to spring training as a member of the 40-man roster but was demoted to Norfolk at the end of camp. However, on April 12, 2010, the Orioles placed starting second baseman Brian Roberts on the 15-day injured list and recalled Turner from Norfolk. On May 21, 2010, Turner was designated for assignment by the Baltimore Orioles. In 17 games with the Orioles, he hit .111 (three hits in 27 at-bats).

=== New York Mets ===
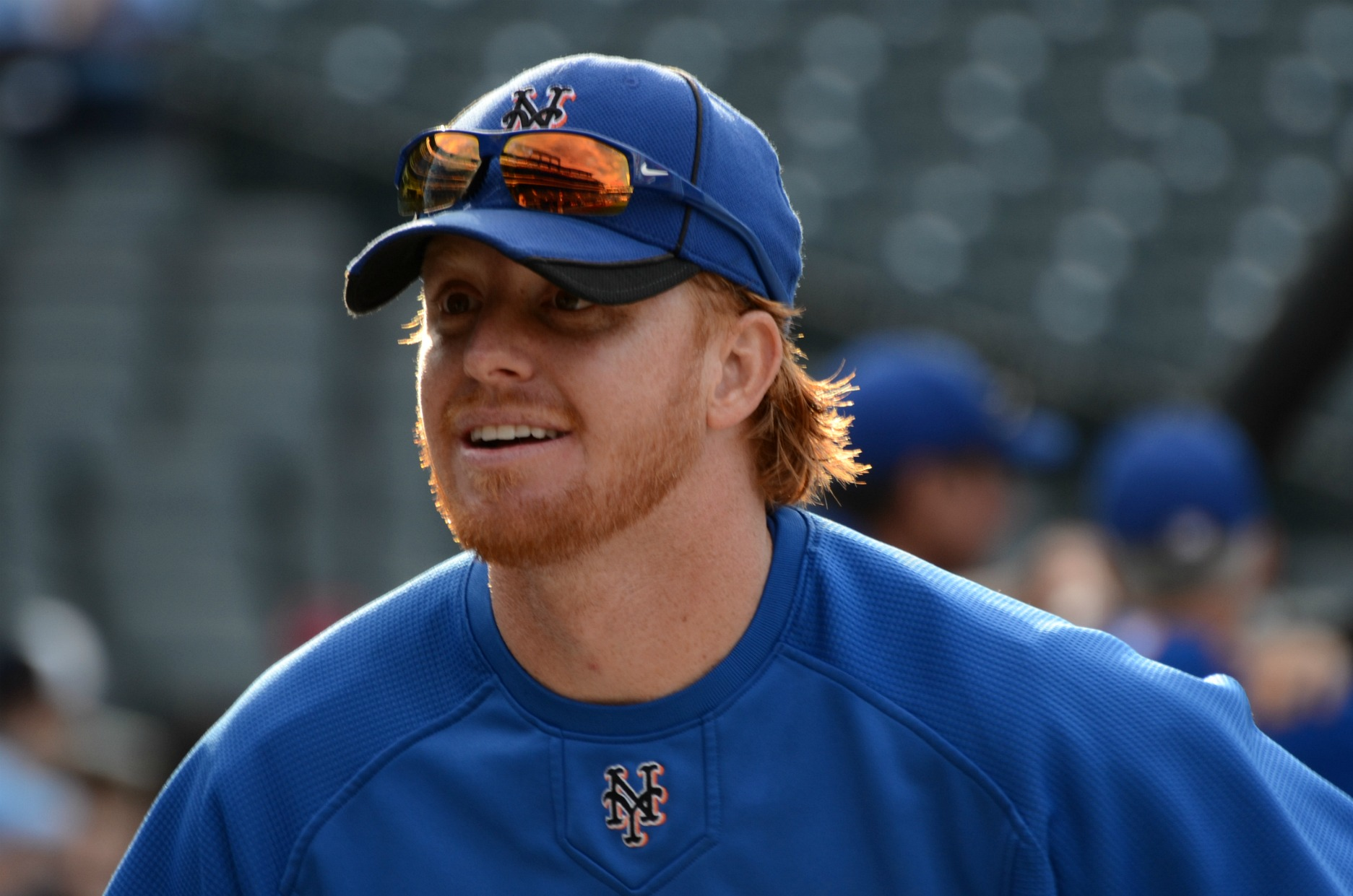
Turner with the 2011 New York Mets

On May 25, 2010, Turner was claimed off waivers from the Orioles by the New York Mets and optioned to Triple-A Buffalo. On June 16, Turner was called up to the Mets, with Nick Evans being sent down to Buffalo. He had one hit in eight at bats with the Mets.

After designating Brad Emaus for assignment on April 19, 2011, the Mets called Turner back up. He hit his first major league home run against the Houston Astros on May 15, 2011, off Aneury Rodriguez. A three-run home run, it capped off a five-RBI day for Turner. On May 21, in a Subway Series game at Yankee Stadium, Turner collected an RBI in his seventh consecutive game, setting a Mets rookie record for most consecutive games with an RBI. With this record and other impressive stats, Turner was named the NL Rookie of the Month for May 2011. He was the first Met to win the award since its creation in 2001.

In 2012, the Mets converted him to an all-around utility infielder but on May 6, 2012, when shortstop Ruben Tejada went on the injured list, Turner began platooning at shortstop with Jordany Valdespin until Tejada returned.

After the 2013 season, Turner was non-tendered by the Mets, making him a free agent. In 301 games with the Mets over four seasons, he hit .265/.326/370.

=== Los Angeles Dodgers ===
Following his release from the Mets, Los Angeles Dodgers bench coach Tim Wallach saw Turner hitting at a Cal State Fullerton alumni game. Turner signed a minor league contract with the Dodgers on February 5, 2014, with an invitation to spring training. His contract was purchased by the Dodgers on March 16 and he was added to the Major League roster.

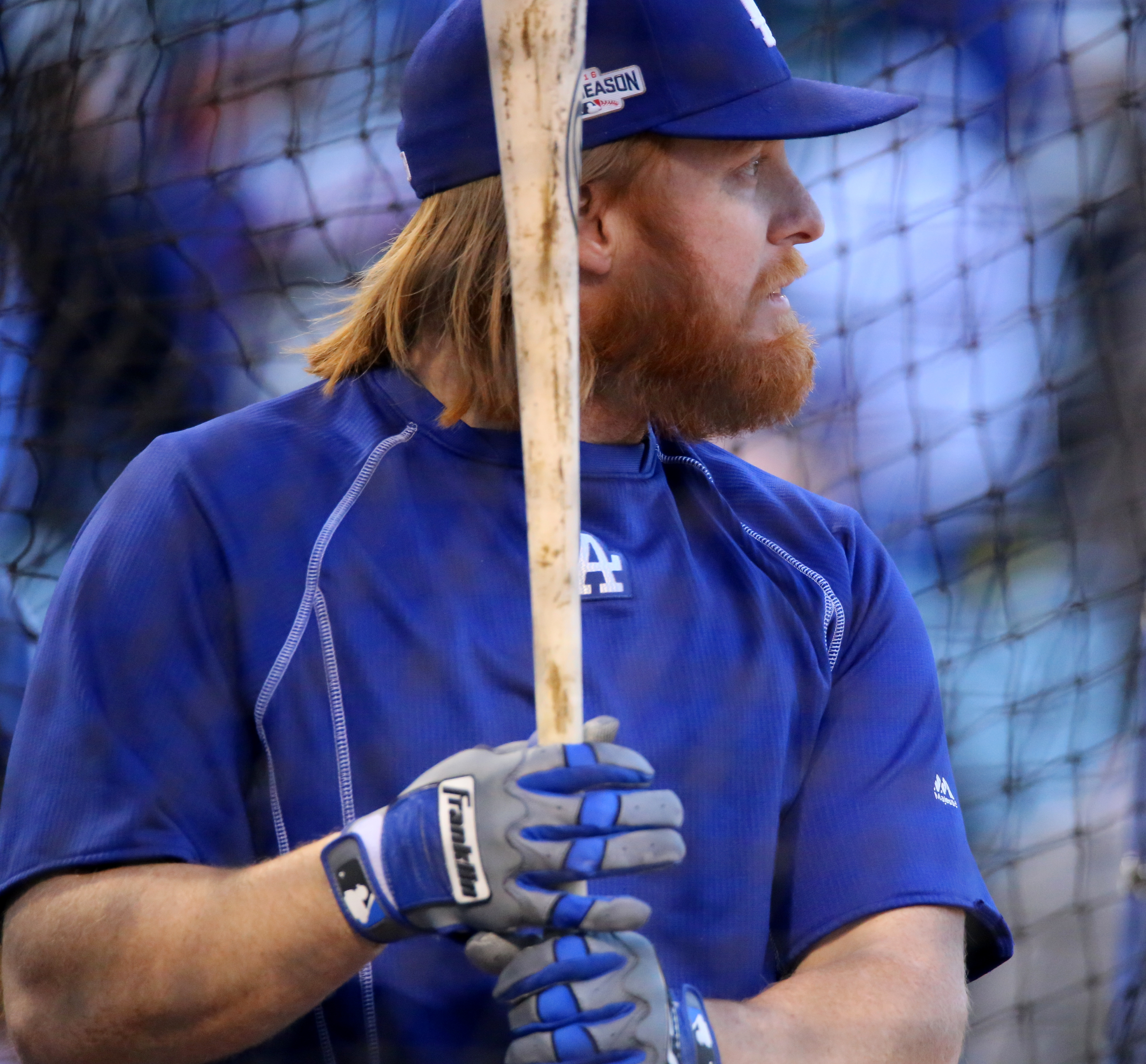
Turner with the 2016 Los Angeles Dodgers

In 2014, Turner played 109 games due to his versatility and injuries to both Hanley Ramírez and Juan Uribe. Turner led the team with a .340 batting average, hitting seven home runs with 43 RBI in 288 at bats.

==== 2015 ====
On January 16, 2015, Turner signed a one-year, $2.5 million contract with the Dodgers, avoiding salary arbitration. He became the starting third baseman for much of the 2015 season and hit .294 with a career-high 16 homers and 60 RBI.

In the 2015 National League Division Series against his former team, the Mets, Turner led the Dodgers with 10 hits in 19 ABs for a .526 average, with an LDS record six of those hits being doubles. The Dodgers, however, went on to lose the series. After the post-season, he underwent arthroscopic surgery on his left knee. He signed a new one year, $5.1 million, contract with the Dodgers in order to avoid salary arbitration in January 2016.

==== 2016 ====
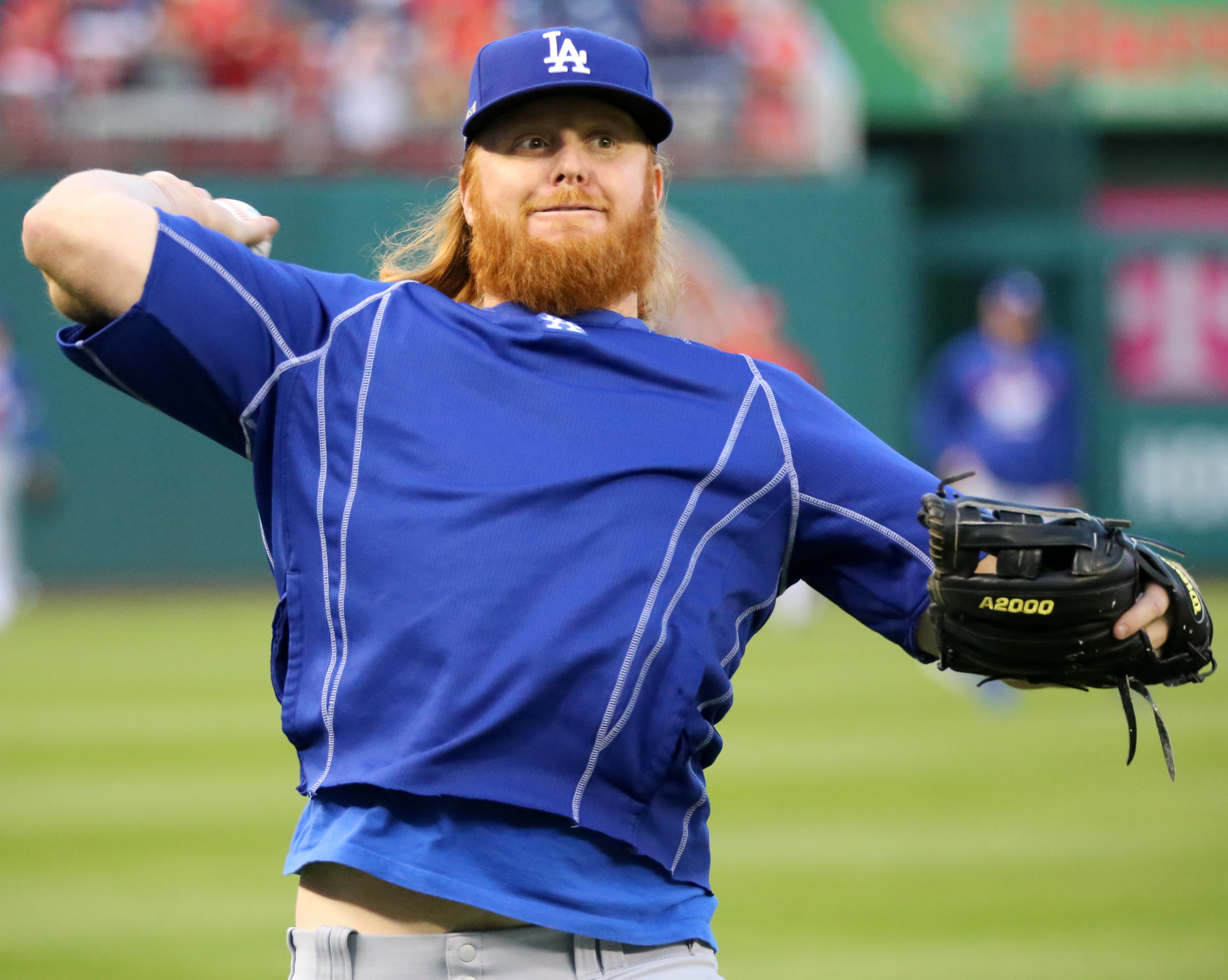
Turner before Game 5 of the 2016 National League Division Series

In 2016, Turner played in a career-high 151 games, and also had career highs in home runs (27) and RBI (90), while batting .275. He had six hits (including a home run) in 15 at-bats in the 2016 National League Division Series, but struggled in the 2016 National League Championship Series, hitting only .200.

==== 2017: All-Star and NLCS MVP ====
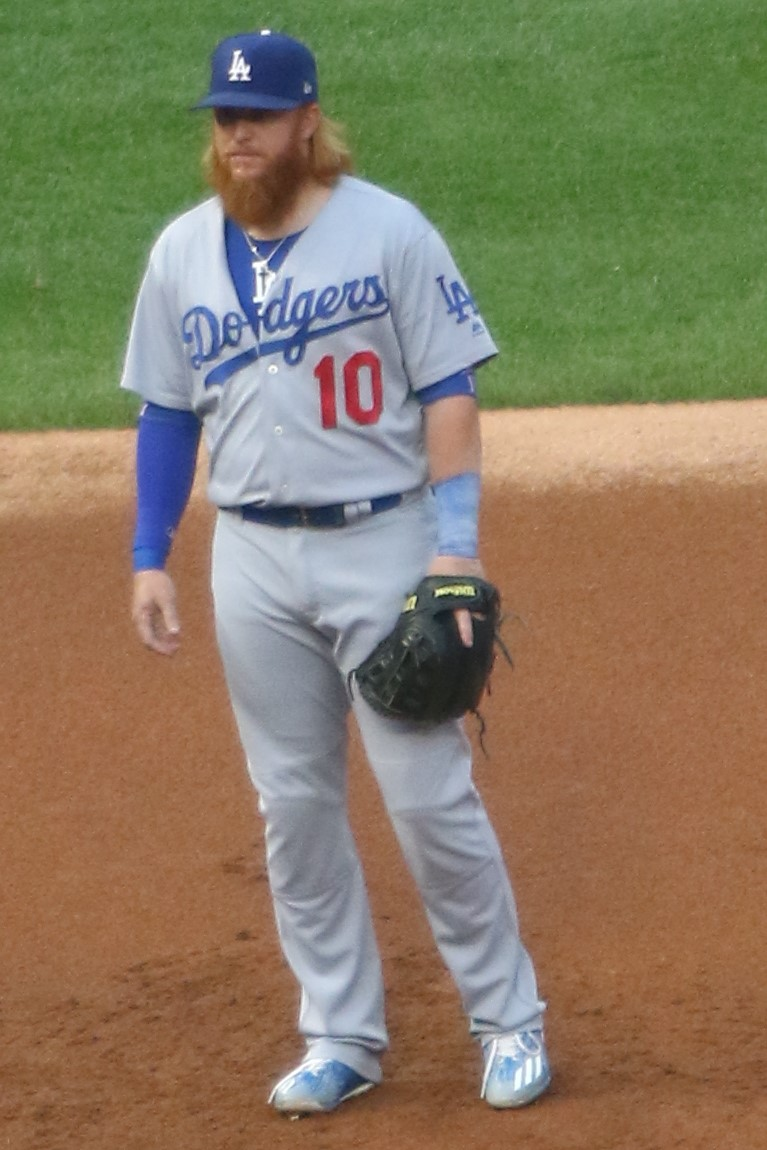
Turner with the 2017 Los Angeles Dodgers

On December 23, 2016, the Dodgers signed Turner to a four-year contract valued at $64 million. Turner started the 2017 season batting .379 before going on the injured list with a strained right hamstring, which kept him out of action from May 18 through June 9. On July 6, he won the All-Star Final Vote, earning a spot in the 2017 Major League Baseball All-Star Game with 20.8 million votes, a Final Vote record. Turner finished the season with a .322 batting average, a .415 on-base percentage, 21 home runs, and 71 RBI, finishing third in the NL in batting average and second in on-base percentage. In the 2017 NLDS, he had six hits in 13 at-bats (.462 average). Turner and Chris Taylor were selected as the co-MVPs of the 2017 National League Championship Series, where he batted .333 with two home runs and seven RBI, including a winning home run in the ninth inning of Game 2 against the Chicago Cubs. However, in the 2017 World Series, he had only four hits in 25 at-bats, for a .160 average as the Dodgers lost to the Houston Astros in seven games. Turner broke Dusty Baker's franchise record for most RBI in a single post-season when he drove in his 14th run in Game One of the World Series.

==== 2018 ====
Turner was hit by a pitch on his left wrist during a spring training game on March 19, 2018. He suffered a non-displaced fracture, which did not require surgery but put him on the injured list to begin the season. Turner did not rejoin the Dodgers until May 15. Turner also missed time following the All-Star break, but rebounded in August and September. He was voted the National League Player of the Month for August after batting .402 (39-for-97) with 22 runs, 11 doubles, one triple, six home runs, 20 RBIs, and a stolen base across August 25 games. On September 4, 2018, Turner was named the Los Angeles Dodgers' 2018 nominee for the Roberto Clemente Award, an annual award given to the player who "best exemplifies the game of baseball, sportsmanship, and community involvement." In 202 at-bats after the All-Star break, Turner hit .356 with a 1.066 OPS, 24 doubles, and nine home runs. Turner would finish the season with a .312 batting average, 14 home runs, and 52 RBIs. Turner's hot streak continued in the 2018 NLDS, where he reached base in nine of 18 plate appearances. He went on to hit .333 (8-for-24) in the 2018 World Series, which his team lost to the Boston Red Sox.

==== 2019 ====
Turner hit a career-high three home runs and drove in six runs against the Atlanta Braves on May 8 in a 9–0 win. On June 14, he hit his 100th career home run, off Kyle Hendricks, in a 5–3 win against the Chicago Cubs.

For the season, Turner batted .290/.372/.509 with 27 home runs and 67 RBIs. On defense in 2019, he had -3 Defensive Runs Saved (DRS), the 13th-lowest among the 17 qualifying third basemen.

==== 2020: World Series championship ====
The 2020 season was delayed by the COVID-19 pandemic, shortening the season to only 60 games. On Opening Day, Turner was hit with a pitch for the 73rd time as a Dodger, tying the franchise record set by Zack Wheat. He broke that record on August 5 in San Diego. He was hampered during the season by a hamstring strain that caused him to miss two weeks of the shortened season.

Turner played in 42 games for the Dodgers, hitting .307/.400/.460 with four homers and 23 RBIs. He was voted by his teammates as the winner of the Roy Campanella Award, the first three-time winner in franchise history. Turner was hitless in eight at-bats in the first round playoff series. In the third game of the 2020 National League Division Series, Turner moved past Steve Garvey for the most playoff hits in Dodgers franchise history with his 64th. He had two hits and two RBI in 10 at-bats in the series. Turner had seven hits, including a home run, in 25 at-bats in the 2020 National League Championship Series and advanced to play in his third World Series.

In the 2020 World Series, against the Tampa Bay Rays, Turner had eight hits (including two home runs) in 25 at-bats as the Dodgers won the championship. During the eighth inning of Game 6, he was pulled from the game because he had tested positive for COVID-19, before returning to the field to take the official celebratory photo with his teammates and staff, in violation of MLB protocols, leading to criticism from many in the media. Turner apologized for his actions a few days later.

==== 2021: All-Star ====
On February 19, 2021, Turner re-signed with the Dodgers on a two-year, $34 million contract, with a $14 million option for a third year.

On August 29, 2021, Turner made his pitching debut in the ninth inning of the Dodgers' 5–0 loss to the Colorado Rockies. He threw 10 pitches (his fastest was 76 mph) for all three outs, gave up no runs, and exited the game to a standing ovation. In 2021, Turner played in 151 games with a .278 batting average, 27 home runs and 87 RBI. Turner struggled in the postseason, with only four hits in 38 at-bats (one home run) in the Wild Card, NLDS and NLCS. He strained his hamstring while running to first base in Game 4 of the NLCS and was ruled out of appearing in any future playoff games in 2021.

==== 2022 ====
In 2022, Turner split his time between third base and designated hitter, appearing in 128 games and batting .278 with 13 homers and 81 RBIs, appearing in 66 games as a third baseman, and 62 games as a DH. He had the slowest sprint speed of any major league third baseman, at 25.0 feet per second. On November 10, the Dodgers declined his $16 million option for the 2023 season, making him a free agent.

=== Boston Red Sox ===
On January 6, 2023, Turner signed a one-year contract with the Boston Red Sox, with a player option for 2024. He would earn $15 million for one season. In 146 games, he hit .276 with 23 home runs and 96 RBI, appearing mostly at DH with some infield appearances. He had the third-slowest sprint speed of any major league DH and was the 16th slowest batter, at 25.2 feet per second. On November 3, he opted out of his contract and became a free agent.

=== Toronto Blue Jays ===
On January 30, 2024, Turner signed a one-year, $13 million contract with the Toronto Blue Jays. In 2024, he was the 5th-oldest player in the American League. Turner played in 91 games for the Blue Jays, batting .250/.350/.372 with 6 home runs and 31 RBI.

=== Seattle Mariners ===
On July 29, 2024, Turner was traded to the Seattle Mariners for minor leaguer RJ Schreck. In 48 games with Seattle, he batted .264/.363/.403 with five home runs and 24 RBI.

=== Chicago Cubs ===
On February 20, 2025, Turner signed a one-year, $6 million contract with the Chicago Cubs. On July 8, Turner hit his 200th career home run off of Joey Wentz of the Minnesota Twins. On August 3, in the bottom of the 9th inning, Turner hit his first walk-off home run off of Keegan Akin in a 5–3 win over the Baltimore Orioles. In 80 total appearances for Chicago, he batted .219/.288/.314 with three home runs, 18 RBI, and two stolen bases. Turner's mutual option with the Cubs for 2026 was declined on November 6, making him a free agent.

=== Toros de Tijuana ===
On April 11, 2026, Turner signed with the Toros de Tijuana of the Mexican League.

== Personal life ==
Turner married his longtime girlfriend in December 2017. Their wedding took place at a beachfront resort in Mexico and was officiated by Orel Hershiser, former Dodger pitcher and current broadcaster. Turner and his wife reside in Studio City. Their son was born in July 2024.

=== Philanthropy ===
Turner and his wife founded the Justin Turner Foundation, a 501(c)3 organization that benefits homeless veterans, children battling life-altering illnesses, and various youth baseball organizations. The foundation hosts an annual charity golf tournament; is an official charity for the LA Marathon; and partners with the Dream Center, 17Strong, and Paralyzed Veterans of America. The Los Angeles City Council declared January 22, 2019 "Justin Turner Day" in honor of his civic contributions. He was also awarded the Roberto Clemente Award in 2022 after his fifth career nomination for his humanitarian actions.

=== Endorsements and business interests ===
Turner was the most endorsed MLB athlete in 2024 with 20 deals, ahead of then-Mariners teammate Julio Rodríguez and Arizona Diamondbacks Corbin Carroll, according to a report by Sponsor United.

In June 2024, Turner became a part-owner and ambassador for Beard Club. Turner's red beard and infield position led to his nickname "RedTurn2" and inspired his social media username, "Redturn2."

== See also ==
- Los Angeles Dodgers award winners and league leaders
- List of Major League Baseball career hit by pitch leaders
- List of Major League Baseball postseason records
