= 2009 Pacific Coast League season =

- League: Pacific Coast League
- Sport: Baseball
- Duration: April 9 – September 7, 2009
- Games: 144
- Teams: 16

Regular season
- Season champions: Albuquerque Isotopes
- Season MVP: Randy Ruiz

Governors' Cup
- Champions: Memphis Redbirds (2nd)
- Runners-up: Sacramento River Cats

PCL seasons
- ← 2008 2010 →

The 2009 Pacific Coast League season began on Thursday, April 9, with all sixteen teams competing on opening day. The regular season ended on Monday, September 7.

In the first round of the playoffs, the Memphis Redbirds defeated the Albuquerque Isotopes, 3-0, and the Sacramento River Cats defeated the Tacoma Rainiers, 3-1. The Redbirds swept the River Cats, 3-0, in the championship series to win the PCL championship.

== Teams ==
American Conference
Division	Team	MLB Affiliation	City	Stadium	Capacity
North	Iowa Cubs	Chicago Cubs	Des Moines, Iowa	Principal Park	11,000
North	Memphis Redbirds	St. Louis Cardinals	Memphis, Tennessee	AutoZone Park	14,320
North	Nashville Sounds	Milwaukee Brewers	Nashville, Tennessee	Herschel Greer Stadium	10,052
North	Omaha Royals	Kansas City Royals	Omaha, Nebraska	Johnny Rosenblatt Stadium	23,100
South	Albuquerque Isotopes	Los Angeles Dodgers	Albuquerque, New Mexico	Isotopes Park	12,215
South	New Orleans Zephyrs	Florida Marlins	Metairie, Louisiana	Zephyr Field	10,000
South	Oklahoma City RedHawks	Texas Rangers	Oklahoma City, Oklahoma	AT&T Bricktown Ballpark	13,166
South	Round Rock Express	Houston Astros	Round Rock, Texas	Dell Diamond	10,000
Pacific Conference
Division	Team	MLB Affiliation	City	Stadium	Capacity
North	Colorado Springs Sky Sox	Colorado Rockies	Colorado Springs, Colorado	Security Service Field	9,000
North	Portland Beavers	San Diego Padres	Portland, Oregon	PGE Park	19,810
North	Salt Lake Bees	Los Angeles Angels of Anaheim	Salt Lake City, Utah	Spring Mobile Ballpark	15,500
North	Tacoma Rainiers	Seattle Mariners	Tacoma, Washington	Cheney Stadium	9,600
South	Fresno Grizzlies	San Francisco Giants	Fresno, California	Chukchansi Park	12,500
South	Las Vegas 51s	Toronto Blue Jays	Las Vegas, Nevada	Cashman Field	10,000
South	Reno Aces	Arizona Diamondbacks	Reno, Nevada	Aces Ballpark	9,100
South	Sacramento River Cats	Oakland Athletics	West Sacramento, California	Raley Field	14,680

== Before the season ==
=== Affiliation changes ===
Before the 2009 season, three PCL teams signed player development contracts (PDC) with different parent clubs.

The Albuquerque Isotopes signed a two-year PDC with the Los Angeles Dodgers through 2010 on September 18, 2008. The Isotopes had previously been affiliated with the Florida Marlins for six seasons in Albuquerque and four seasons when the franchise was the Calgary Cannons. This would mark the return of Dodgers prospects to Albuquerque, as Los Angeles was the parent club for the Albuquerque Dukes from 1972-00 when the club moved to Portland and were renamed the Portland Beavers.

The Las Vegas 51s signed a two-year PDC with the Toronto Blue Jays through 2010 on September 21, 2008. The 51s had previously been affiliated with the Los Angeles Dodgers for eight years. The relationship between Los Angeles and Las Vegas soured for years because of the lack of sufficient facilities at Cashman Field, including the lack of an on site weight room and indoor batting cage. Toronto became the third affiliate in Las Vegas' 28-year history and Las Vegas was only the second triple-A affiliate in Toronto's 33-year history.

The New Orleans Zephyrs signed a two-year PDC with the Florida Marlins through 2010 on September 21, 2008. The Zephyrs had previously been affiliated with the New York Mets for the past two seasons. Florida became New Orleans' third major league affiliate in five years.

=== Team changes ===
- The Tucson Sidewinders moved to Reno, Nevada becoming the Reno Aces. The team remained in the Pacific Conference – South Division and remanined the top affiliate of the Arizona Diamondbacks for at least the 2009 season.
- The Oklahoma RedHawks rebranded themselves as the Oklahoma City RedHawks and adopted new logos and team colors.
- The Colorado Springs Sky Sox introduced new logos and a new color scheme.

== Standings ==
Pacific Coast League - American North Division
Team	Win	Loss	%	GB
Memphis Redbirds	77	67	.535	—
Nashville Sounds	75	69	.521	2
Iowa Cubs	72	72	.500	5
Omaha Royals	64	80	.444	13

Pacific Coast League - American South Division
Team	Win	Loss	%	GB
Albuquerque Isotopes	80	64	.556	—
Oklahoma City RedHawks	69	75	.479	11
New Orleans Zephyrs	63	80	.441	16½
Round Rock Express	63	81	.438	17

Pacific Coast League - Pacific North Division
Team	Win	Loss	%	GB
Colorado Springs Sky Sox	73	69	.514	—
Tacoma Rainiers	74	70	.514	—
Salt Lake Bees	72	71	.503	1½
Portland Beavers	60	84	.417	14

Pacific Coast League - Pacific South Division
Team	Win	Loss	%	GB
Sacramento River Cats	86	57	.601	—
Reno Aces	79	64	.552	7
Fresno Grizzlies	71	73	.493	15½
Las Vegas 51s	71	73	.493	15½

Tacoma won the Pacific South Division due to a divisional tiebreaker.

== Playoffs ==
1st Round
1	Memphis Redbirds	3
4	Albuquerque Isotopes	0
3	Sacramento River Cats	3
2	Tacoma Rainiers	1

Pacific Coast League
Memphis Redbirds	3
Sacramento River Cats	0

The Pacific Coast League did not have an exact name for the league's trophy.

== See also ==
- 2009 International League season
