= 2017 National League Championship Series =

Team (Wins)	Managers	Season
Los Angeles Dodgers (4)	Dave Roberts	104–58 (.642), GA: 11
Chicago Cubs (1)	Joe Maddon	92–70 (.568), GA: 6
- Dates: October 14–19
- MVP: Justin Turner and Chris Taylor (Los Angeles)
- Umpires: Lance Barksdale (Games 1–2); Eric Cooper (Games 3–5); Alfonso Márquez, Todd Tichenor, Bill Welke, Mike Winters (crew chief), Jim Wolf

Broadcast
- Television: TBS
- TV announcers: Brian Anderson, Ron Darling and Sam Ryan
- Radio: ESPN
- Radio announcers: Dan Shulman and Aaron Boone
- NLDS: Los Angeles Dodgers over Arizona Diamondbacks (3–0); Chicago Cubs over Washington Nationals (3–2)

The 2017 National League Championship Series was a best-of-seven playoff in Major League Baseball’s 2017 postseason pitting the overall #1 seed Los Angeles Dodgers against the defending World Series champion and third-seeded Chicago Cubs for the National League pennant and the right to play in the 2017 World Series. The series was a rematch of the 2016 NLCS, which Chicago won four games to two en route to their first World Series victory since 1908. This was just the 10th time two teams have met in at least two straight League Championship Series, which have existed since divisional play began in 1969. The series was the 48th in league history. The Dodgers beat the Cubs in five games to win the NL pennant for the first time in 29 years, their last one in 1988.

This was the first time in history that the NLCS and ALCS teams were from the four most populous U.S. cities: New York, Los Angeles, Chicago, and Houston.

For the first time, Major League Baseball sold presenting sponsorships to all of its postseason series; this NLCS was sponsored by Camping World and was officially known as the National League Championship Series presented by Camping World.

The Dodgers would go on to lose to the Houston Astros in the World Series in seven games.

== Background ==
This was the Dodgers' second consecutive appearance in the National League Championship Series, and 12th all-time (with this being their third appearance in the past five seasons). In 2016, they lost in six games to the Chicago Cubs, the eventual World Series winner. By having the best regular season record in the NL and MLB, the Dodgers held home-field advantage throughout the entire playoffs.

This was the Cubs' third consecutive appearance in the NLCS. In 2015, they were swept in four games by the New York Mets. In 2016, they defeated the Dodgers (4–2) in six games, eventually going on to win their first World Series since 1908.

This was the third postseason meeting between the Cubs and Dodgers. The clubs have split their two previous postseason meetings. Los Angeles swept Chicago in the 2008 NLDS (3–0) and the Cubs defeated the Dodgers in the 2016 NLCS in six games (4–2).

This was just the tenth time two teams have met in at least two straight League Championship Series, which have existed since divisional play began in 1969. The last time two teams met in the NLCS consecutive years was back in 2008 and 2009, in which the Phillies defeated the Dodgers in five games on both occasions (4–1). The last time a team avenged an NLCS loss with an NLCS win against the same opponent the following year was the Astros over the Cardinals in 2005 (4–2) after losing to the Cardinals in 2004 (4–3).

The Dodgers offense took a big hit before the series even began when All-Star shortstop Corey Seager was left off the NLCS roster as a result of a back injury suffered in game three of the division series.

== Summary ==
Los Angeles won the series, 4–1.

Game	Date	Score	Location	Time	Attendance
1	October 14	Chicago Cubs – 2, Los Angeles Dodgers – 5	Dodger Stadium	3:24	54,289
2	October 15	Chicago Cubs – 1, Los Angeles Dodgers – 4	Dodger Stadium	3:20	54,479
3	October 17	Los Angeles Dodgers – 6, Chicago Cubs – 1	Wrigley Field	3:39	41,871
4	October 18	Los Angeles Dodgers – 2, Chicago Cubs – 3	Wrigley Field	3:15	42,195
5	October 19	Los Angeles Dodgers – 11, Chicago Cubs – 1	Wrigley Field	3:06	42,735

== Game summaries ==
=== Game 1 ===
October 14, 2017 5:09 pm (PDT) at Dodger Stadium in Los Angeles, California, 84 °F (29 °C), clear
Team	1	2	3	4	5	6	7	8	9	R	H	E
Chicago	0	0	0	2	0	0	0	0	0	2	4	0
Los Angeles	0	0	0	0	2	1	2	0	X	5	8	0
WP: Kenta Maeda (1–0) LP: Héctor Rondón (0–1) Sv: Kenley Jansen (1); Home runs: CHC: Albert Almora Jr. (1); LAD: Chris Taylor (1), Yasiel Puig (1); Attendance: 54,289; Boxscore

Being without All-Star Corey Seager for the series, the Dodgers used journeyman Charlie Culberson at shortstop in Game 1 for just his second start of the season.

Albert Almora hit a two-run home run off Clayton Kershaw in the fourth inning. Cubs' starter Jose Quintana held the Dodgers offense to just one baserunner through four innings. However, the Dodgers tied the game in the fifth inning with a Yasiel Puig double and Culberson sacrifice fly after two consecutive walks. Chris Taylor and Puig hit solo home runs in the sixth and seventh off Hector Rondon and Mike Montgomery, respectively. With two runs batted in, Puig became the first Dodger to have three multi-RBI game in the team's first four postseason games since Dusty Baker in 1977.

After Puig's home run, Culberson doubled and was tagged out at home trying to score on Justin Turner's single off John Lackey. Chicago manager Joe Maddon was ejected from the game by Home plate umpire Lance Barksdale after the Dodgers challenged the call, which was overturned upon video review and gave Los Angeles a 5–2 lead. Culberson was determined to have had his path to home plate blocked by Cubs catcher Willson Contreras before he had possession of the ball.

Kershaw allowed four hits and two runs in five innings of work before the Dodgers bullpen held the Cubs hitless over the next four innings. Kenta Maeda earned the win, getting two groundouts and a lineout on five pitches. Kenley Jansen struck out all four batters he faced to earn his third save this postseason.

=== Game 2 ===
October 15, 2017 4:39 pm (PDT) at Dodger Stadium in Los Angeles, California 92 °F (33 °C), sunny
Team	1	2	3	4	5	6	7	8	9	R	H	E
Chicago	0	0	0	0	1	0	0	0	0	1	3	0
Los Angeles	0	0	0	0	1	0	0	0	3	4	5	0
WP: Kenley Jansen (1–0) LP: Brian Duensing (0–1); Home runs: CHC: Addison Russell (1); LAD: Justin Turner (1); Attendance: 54,479; Boxscore

In the second game, Jon Lester and Rich Hill each pitched four scoreless innings before allowing solo runs in the fifth, a solo homer by Addison Russell in the top half and a two-out RBI single by Justin Turner after a leadoff double by Charlie Culberson. The bullpens kept the game tied until the bottom of the ninth when Turner hit a walk-off three-run home run off John Lackey after walks to Yasiel Puig off Brian Duensing and Chris Taylor off Lackey. It was the Dodgers' first walk-off homer in the post-season since Kirk Gibson's homer in game one of the 1988 World Series, exactly 29 years prior.

=== Game 3 ===
October 17, 2017 8:02 pm (CDT) at Wrigley Field in Chicago, Illinois, 67 °F (19 °C), clear
Team	1	2	3	4	5	6	7	8	9	R	H	E
Los Angeles	0	1	1	0	1	1	0	2	0	6	9	0
Chicago	1	0	0	0	0	0	0	0	0	1	8	2
WP: Yu Darvish (1–0) LP: Kyle Hendricks (0–1); Home runs: LAD: Andre Ethier (1), Chris Taylor (2); CHC: Kyle Schwarber (1); Attendance: 41,871; Boxscore

The series moved to Wrigley Field in Chicago for Game Three. Kyle Schwarber homered off Yu Darvish in the first inning to give the Cubs an early lead, but it was the only run Darvish allowed in 6 1/3 innings, while he struck out seven Cubs batters. Andre Ethier, making his first start of the post-season, tied the game up with a solo home run in the second off Kyle Hendricks and Chris Taylor homered in the third to put the Dodgers ahead 2–1. The team added on against the Cubs' pitching staff. Joc Pederson doubled to lead off the fifth and scored on Chris Taylor's triple. Next inning, the Dodgers put two on with no outs off Hendricks, who was relieved by Carl Edwards. Edwards walked two to force in another run. In the eighth, Mike Montgomery allowed a leadoff walk and single, then threw two wild pitches that allowed another run to score before Kyle Farmer's sacrifice fly made it 6–1 Dodgers. Their bullpen continued to shut down the Cubs and this was the sixth straight post-season game they won, a franchise record.

=== Game 4 ===
October 18, 2017 8:01 pm (CDT) at Wrigley Field in Chicago, Illinois, 64 °F (18 °C), clear
Team	1	2	3	4	5	6	7	8	9	R	H	E
Los Angeles	0	0	1	0	0	0	0	1	0	2	4	0
Chicago	0	2	0	0	1	0	0	0	X	3	5	0
WP: Jake Arrieta (1–0) LP: Alex Wood (0–1) Sv: Wade Davis (1); Home runs: LAD: Cody Bellinger (1), Justin Turner (2); CHC: Willson Contreras (1), Javier Báez 2 (2); Attendance: 42,195; Boxscore

In game four, Jake Arrieta struck out nine batters over 6 2/3 innings in game five for the Cubs while Dodgers starter Alex Wood struck out seven in 4 2/3 innings. All the runs in the game were on solo homers. Cody Bellinger and Justin Turner for the Dodgers in the third and eighth off Arrieta and Wade Davis, respectively. Willson Contreras hit one in the second and Javier Báez hit two home runs in the second and fifth for the Cubs, who staved off elimination with a 3–2 win, despite manager Joe Maddon being ejected for the second time this series. Davis pitched the last two innings for the save.

This would be the last Cubs’ postseason victory of the Theo Epstein-era (2012-2020).

=== Game 5 ===
October 19, 2017 7:09 pm (CDT) at Wrigley Field in Chicago, Illinois, 62 °F (17 °C), clear
Team	1	2	3	4	5	6	7	8	9	R	H	E
Los Angeles	1	1	5	2	0	0	0	0	2	11	16	0
Chicago	0	0	0	1	0	0	0	0	0	1	4	0
WP: Clayton Kershaw (1–0) LP: José Quintana (0–1); Home runs: LAD: Enrique Hernández 3 (3); CHC: Kris Bryant (1); Attendance: 42,735; Boxscore

The Dodgers jumped on top in Game 5 off Jose Quintana when Chris Taylor drew a leadoff walk in the first and scored on Cody Bellinger's one-out double. A home run in the second by Enrique Hernández made it 2–0 Dodgers. Next inning, Taylor hit a leadoff double and scored on Justin Turner's single. Quintana allowed two more singles to load the bases with no outs. Hector Rondon in relief struck out Logan Forsythe, but Hernandez blew the game open with a grand slam, becoming only the fourth Dodger to hit a postseason grand slam (joining Ron Cey and Dusty Baker from the 1977 NLCS and James Loney in the 2008 NLDS). Next inning, Forsythe's two-run double off John Lackey made it 9–0 Dodgers. Kris Bryant scored the Cubs' only run via a solo home run in the fourth. Every run scored by the Cubs in this series was via home runs. Hernandez's two-run home run in the ninth off Mike Montgomery extended the Dodgers' lead to 11–1. His seven RBIs in the game set a NLCS record. Kenley Jansen retired Bryant, Anthony Rizzo and Contreras in the bottom of the 9th inning as the Dodgers won the pennant and went to their first World Series since 1988. Chris Taylor and Justin Turner were voted co-MVPs of the series. As for Chicago, their World Series reign was over. This was the third straight year the National League pennant winning team clinched at Wrigley Field.

=== Composite line score ===
2017 NLCS (4–1): Los Angeles Dodgers beat Chicago Cubs

Team	1	2	3	4	5	6	7	8	9	R	H	E
Chicago Cubs	1	2	0	3	2	0	0	0	0	8	24	2
Los Angeles Dodgers	1	2	7	2	4	2	2	3	5	28	42	0
Total attendance: 235,569 Average attendance: 47,114

The Dodgers +20 run differential for the entire series is tied for the fourth largest in a postseason series.
