= Corey Seager =

American baseball player (born 1994)

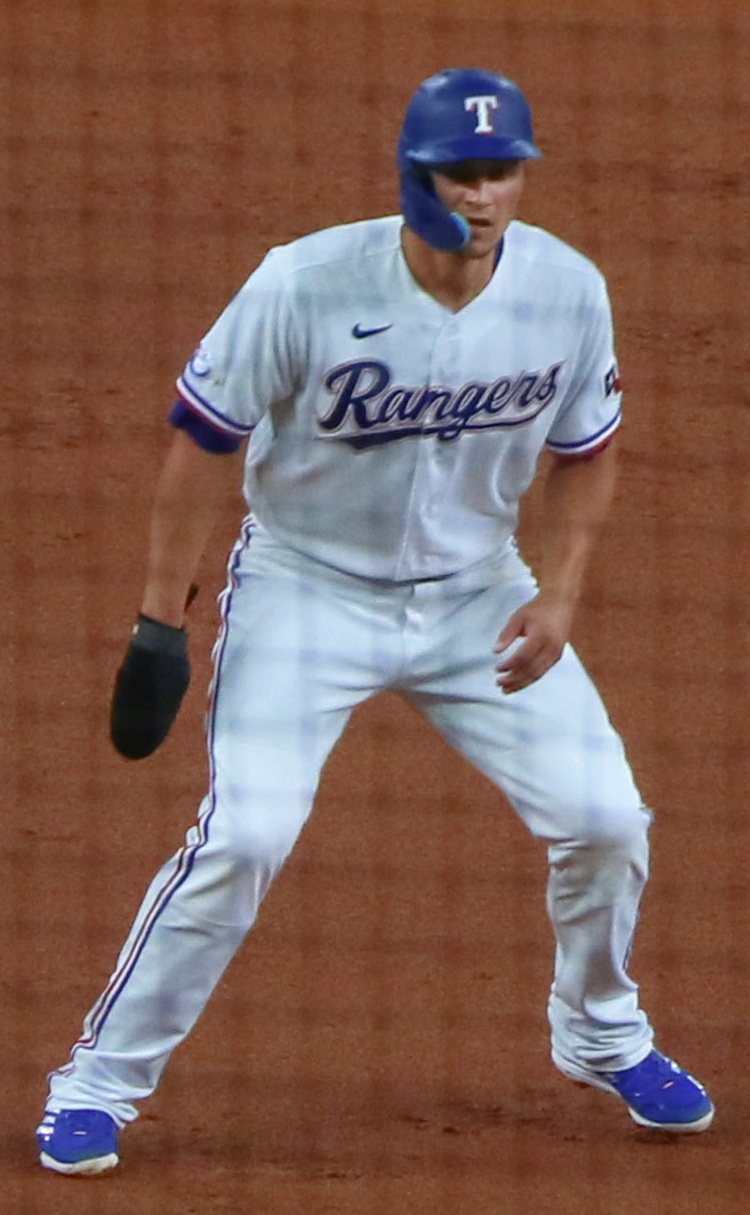
- Seager with the Texas Rangers in 2022

Texas Rangers – No. 5
- Shortstop
- Born: April 27, 1994 (age 32); Charlotte, North Carolina, U.S.
- Bats: Left Throws: Right

MLB debut
- September 3, 2015, for the Los Angeles Dodgers

MLB statistics (through 2026 season)
- Batting average: .284
- Home runs: 241
- Runs batted in: 718
- Stats at Baseball Reference

Teams
- Los Angeles Dodgers (2015–2021); Texas Rangers (2022–present)

Career highlights and awards
- 5× All-Star (2016, 2017, 2022–2024); 2× World Series champion (2020, 2023); 2× World Series MVP (2020, 2023); All-MLB First Team (2023); All-MLB Second Team (2020); NL Rookie of the Year (2016); NLCS MVP (2020); 3× Silver Slugger Award (2016, 2017, 2023)

Corey Drew Seager (born April 27, 1994) is an American professional baseball shortstop for the Texas Rangers of Major League Baseball (MLB). He has previously played in MLB for the Los Angeles Dodgers. He is often regarded as one of the best shortstops of his generation.

The Dodgers selected Seager in the first round of the 2012 MLB draft, and he made his major league debut in 2015. He was the 2016 National League (NL) Rookie of the Year and was an MLB All-Star in his first two full seasons in the majors. He was named the NL Championship Series Most Valuable Player (MVP) and the World Series MVP while leading the Dodgers to the 2020 World Series title.

After seven years with the Dodgers, Seager entered free agency and signed a 10-year contract worth $325 million with the Rangers. With the Rangers, Seager has been named an All-Star three times. He helped Texas claim their first World Series championship in 2023 and was named World Series MVP for the second time, becoming only the 4th player to achieve this feat and the only player to win the World Series MVP in both leagues.

== Early life ==
Corey Seager was born in Charlotte, North Carolina, to Jeff and Jody Seager. He is the youngest of three brothers. His oldest brother Kyle Seager is a former third baseman for the Seattle Mariners. The middle brother, Justin, was drafted by the Mariners in the 12th round of the 2013 Major League Baseball draft. Seager grew up a New York Yankees fan and idolized Derek Jeter.

Seager attended Northwest Cabarrus High School in Concord, North Carolina, graduating in 2012. He played baseball and basketball for the school and was the number one baseball recruit in the state. Seager committed to attend the University of South Carolina on a college baseball scholarship.

== Professional career ==
=== Draft and minor leagues ===
The Los Angeles Dodgers of Major League Baseball (MLB) selected Seager in the first round with the 18th overall selection of the 2012 MLB draft. He received a $2.35 million signing bonus to sign with the Dodgers instead of attending South Carolina.

Seager began his professional career with the Ogden Raptors of the Pioneer League, where he had a .309 batting average in 46 games in 2012. He was promoted to the Great Lakes Loons of the Single–A Midwest League for 2013. He hit .309 with 12 home runs and 57 runs batted in (RBI) in 74 games for Great Lakes and was promoted on August 3 to the Rancho Cucamonga Quakes of the High–A California League. In 27 games at the new level, he hit just .160. Seager played for the Glendale Desert Dogs in the Arizona Fall League after the 2013 regular season, and was selected to play in the AFL Fall Stars Game.

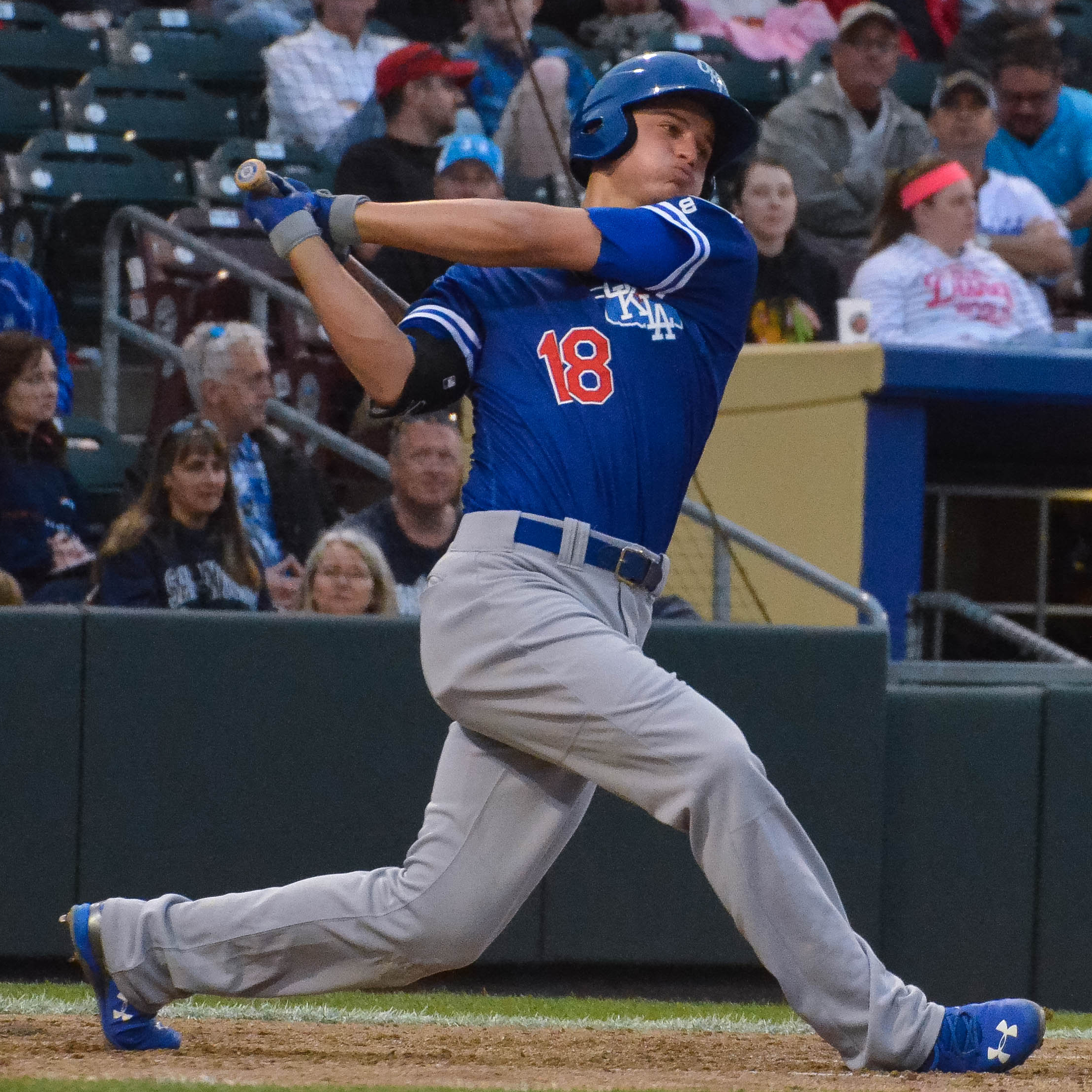
Seager batting for the Oklahoma City Dodgers in 2015

In 2014, Seager hit .352 with 18 home runs and 70 RBI for the Quakes and was selected to the mid-season California League All-Star team. He played for the USA team at the 2014 All-Star Futures Game. After the Futures Game, Seager was promoted to the Chattanooga Lookouts of the Double–A Southern League. With the Lookouts, he played in 38 games and hit .345.

Seager was named the MVP of the California League for 2014. He was also selected to Baseball America's minor league All-Star team. On September 26, the Dodgers announced that Seager was the co-winner, along with Joc Pederson, of the organization's "Minor League Player of the Year" award. He returned to the Desert Dogs in the AFL after the season and was awarded a spot on the AFL Top Prospects List.

Seager received a non-roster invite to the Dodgers major league spring training in 2015. MLB.com ranked him the 7th-best prospect in baseball going into the 2015 season, and Baseball America named him the #5 prospect in 2015. The Dodgers assigned Seager to their new Double–A affiliate, the Tulsa Drillers of the Texas League, to start the 2015 season. In 20 games with the Drillers, Seager hit .375 with five homers and 15 RBI. Manager Razor Shines said of him, "I'm running out of words to describe this kid. He's phenomenal."

On May 1, 2015, Seager was promoted to the Oklahoma City Dodgers of the Triple–A Pacific Coast League (PCL). In a game on May 28 against the Salt Lake Bees, Seager had six hits in six at-bats, including a home run, and six RBI. He was the second player in the history of the Oklahoma City franchise to record six hits in one game. He was selected to the mid-season PCL All-Star team. In 104 games for Oklahoma City, Seager hit .276 with 13 homers and 59 RBI. Baseball America selected him to their Minor League All-Star team, and named him a Triple–A All-Star and the Triple–A Player of the Year.

=== Los Angeles Dodgers (2015–2021) ===
==== 2015: September call-up ====
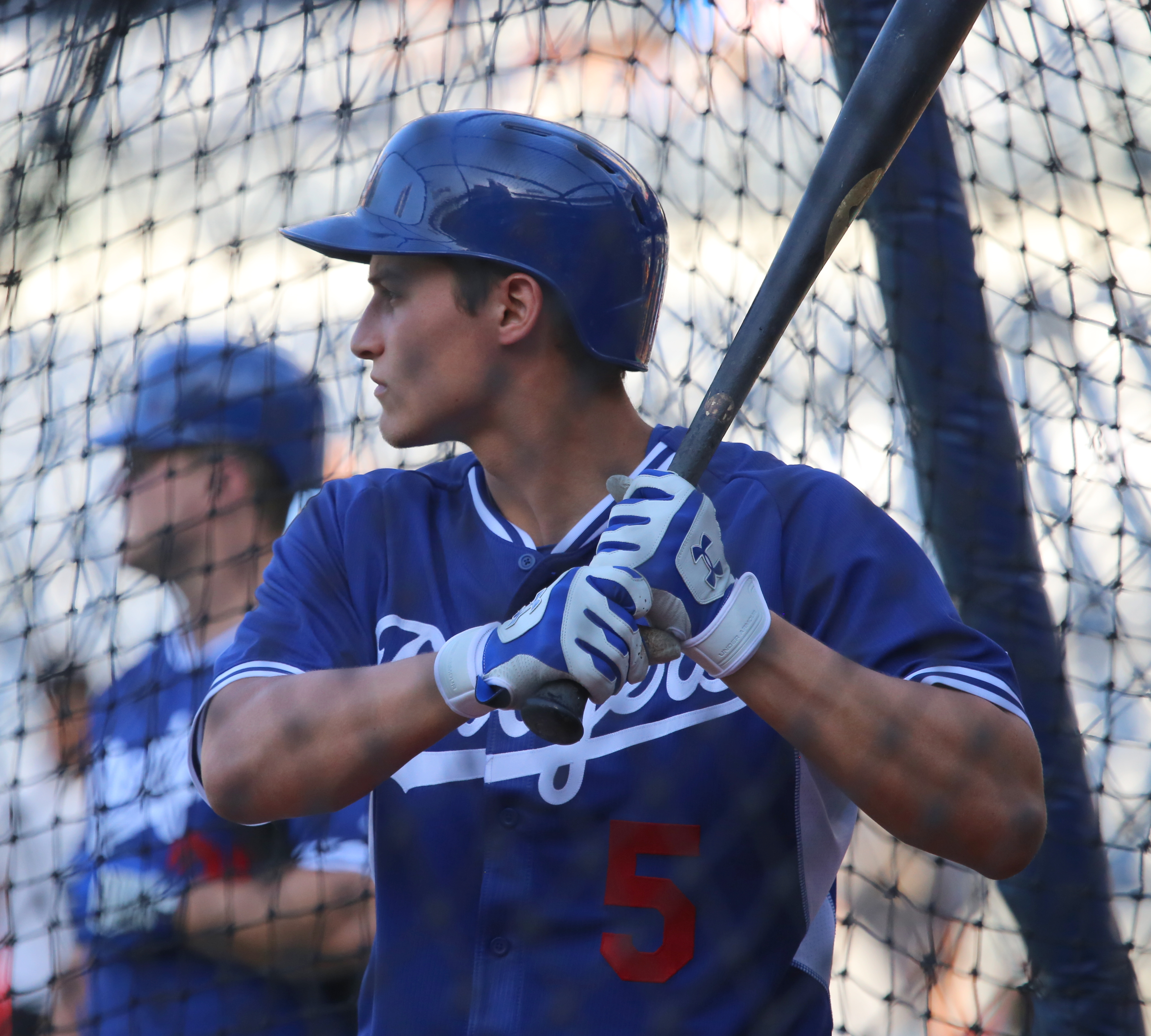
Seager with the 2015 Los Angeles Dodgers

On September 3, 2015, the Dodgers called Seager up to the majors, and he made his debut that night as the starting shortstop against the San Diego Padres. He had two hits in four at-bats with two RBI in his debut, with his first MLB hit being a double to right field off of Colin Rea of the Padres.

On September 12, 2015, against the Arizona Diamondbacks, Seager was 4-for-4 with his first MLB home run (off Josh Collmenter), a walk and a stolen base, making him the third-youngest player in history to accomplish that feat (after Ken Griffey Jr. and Orlando Cepeda). On September 21, Seager passed Bill Russell by reaching base safely in his first 16 major league starts, a new Dodger record. He hit .337 in 27 games with the Dodgers, with four homers and 17 RBI, supplanting Jimmy Rollins as the Dodgers starting shortstop down the stretch. He was the starting shortstop for the Dodgers in the first game of the 2015 National League Division Series, making him the youngest position player to start a postseason game in franchise history.

==== 2016: Rookie of the year ====
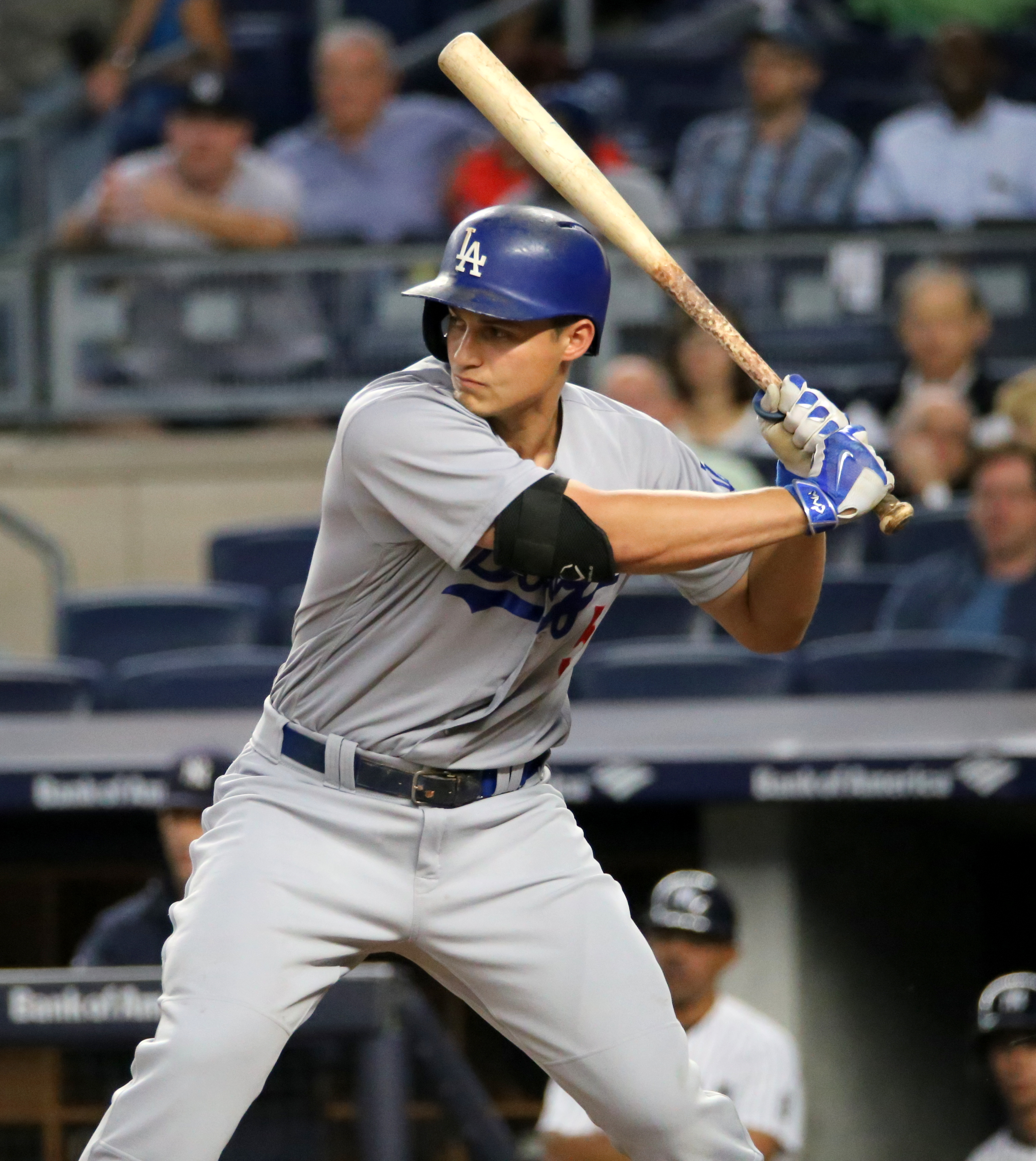
Seager for the Dodgers during an inter-league game at Yankee Stadium on September 13, 2016.

Seager was the Dodgers' Opening Day starting shortstop in 2016, the youngest for the Dodgers since Gene Mauch in 1944. On June 3, Seager hit three home runs in a game against the Atlanta Braves. He was the first Dodgers shortstop to do so since Kevin Elster in 2000, the youngest shortstop in major league history to accomplish that feat, and the sixth youngest player overall. Seager was named the National League Rookie of the Month for June and was selected to play on the National League All-Star team. He also participated in the Home Run Derby and hit 15 homers, the second best total for a Dodgers player in Derby history, though he failed to advance past the first round.

On August 6, 2016, Seager hit his 31st double of the season, surpassing Eric Karros to set a new Dodgers rookie record, and two days later, he hit his 20th home run of the season, surpassing Hanley Ramírez for sole possession of the Los Angeles Dodgers record for home runs in a season by a shortstop. He hit his 22nd homer on August 22, tying Glenn Wright for the franchise record. On August 27, he passed Wright to take sole possession of the record, with a first inning homer off of Jason Hammel of the Chicago Cubs. He and his brother, Kyle Seager, became the first pair of brothers in major league history to each hit 25 or more homers in the same season. With two hits on September 17, Seager moved past Steve Sax (1982) for the most hits in a season by a Los Angeles Dodgers rookie. On September 20, he became the first Dodgers rookie to hit 40 doubles in a season. He finished his rookie season with a .308 batting average, 26 home runs, and 72 RBI in 157 games. Baseball America selected him as their 2016 Rookie of the Year, as did The Sporting News and the Players Choice Awards.

Seager homered in the first inning of Game 1 of the 2016 National League Division Series against the Washington Nationals, becoming the youngest Dodgers player in history to hit a postseason home run. He hit .130 with two home runs in the Division Series and .286 with no homers in the Championship Series. After the season, Seager was awarded with the Silver Slugger Award, the third Dodgers rookie to win the award. He was also the unanimous winner of the National League Rookie of the Year Award and the 2016 Esurance MLB/This Year in Baseball Award winner as Best Rookie.

==== 2017: Second all-star appearance ====
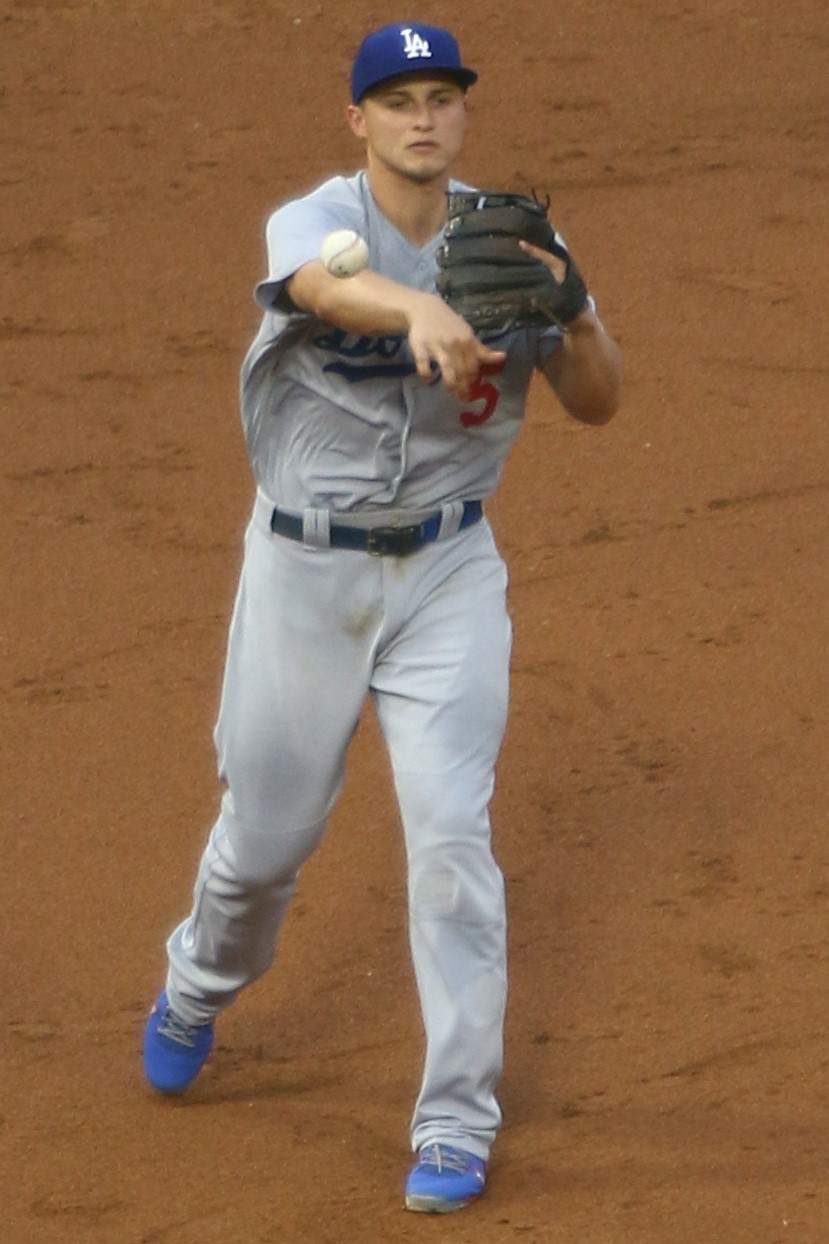
Seager with the 2017 Los Angeles Dodgers

Following his Rookie of the Year campaign, Seager was considered one of the faces of the "new golden age" of shortstops along with Francisco Lindor and Trevor Story, as the careers of older shortstops such as Derek Jeter, Alex Rodriguez, and Nomar Garciaparra had concluded. On June 20, 2017, Seager had his second career three-home run game, against the New York Mets. He batted .295/.375/.479 with 22 home runs, was named to his second straight All-Star game, and won his second consecutive Silver Slugger Award, the first Dodgers player to win back-to-back awards since Mike Piazza won five straight from 1993 to 1997. He was bothered at the end of the season by a sore elbow, which reduced his playing time and effectiveness in September.

A back injury suffered in the third game of the 2017 NLDS kept Seager off of the Dodgers roster for the 2017 NLCS. However, he returned to the roster for the 2017 World Series. He had six hits in 27 at-bats, including a home run and a double in the World Series, but the Dodgers lost the series in seven games to the Houston Astros.

==== 2018: More injuries and Tommy John surgery ====
On April 30, Seager was diagnosed with a strain in the ulnar collateral ligament of his right elbow, requiring Tommy John surgery, which caused him to miss the remainder of the 2018 season. He was 27-for-101 (.267) with two home runs and 13 RBIs in the 26 games he played. He also underwent arthroscopic surgery on his left hip on August 7.

==== 2019 ====
Seager was eligible for arbitration for the first time during the 2018–2019 offseason. He agreed to a one-year deal with the Dodgers for $4 million.

On June 11, Seager strained his left hamstring while baserunning and was placed on the 10-day injured list retroactive to the following day. An MRI exam confirmed the diagnosis of Grade 1 to Grade 2 strain. Prior to the injury, Seager had been hitting .459 during his last 37 at-bats (17 hits, including 7 doubles). He was activated from the injured list on July 10, and two days later began the second half of the season batting at the top of the order against the Red Sox. Seager finished the regular season batting .272/.335/.483 with 19 home runs, and despite missing one month of play, he set new career highs with 44 doubles (tied for the NL lead) and 87 RBIs.

==== 2020: NLCS and World Series MVP ====
In his second arbitration-eligible season, Seager agreed with the Dodgers to a one-year, $7.6 million contract. On August 17, Corey faced his brother, Mariners third baseman Kyle Seager, for the first time in an MLB game and both homered in the game, becoming the first pair of brothers to homer in the same game since César and Felipe Crespo did so on June 7, 2001. The emotions of and background leading up to the Seager brothers' August 17 encounter was published in a mini-documentary on the Dodgers' official YouTube channel.

Seager completed the 2020 regular season having played in 51 of 60 games and hit .307/.358/.585. Among all qualified hitters on the Dodgers, he led the team in batting average, slugging percentage, hits (65), doubles (12), and RBIs (41). Seager attributed much of his hitting success during the season to being fully healthy, as partly evidenced by his career-best 93.2 miles per hour (150.0 km/h) Statcast average exit velocity. On defense, he had the highest fielding percentage among major league shortstops, at .952. Seager was named MVP of the 2020 National League Championship Series, and was then named MVP of the 2020 World Series, while leading the Dodgers to their first championship since 1988. Between the NLCS and the World Series, Seager hit .347/.439/.816 with 7 home runs and 16 RBIs.

==== 2021 ====
In his third and final arbitration-eligible season, Seager agreed to a one-year, $13.75 million contract with the Dodgers. Seager fractured his right hand when he was hit by a pitch by Ross Detwiler of the Miami Marlins on May 15. On September 26, 2021, Seager hit his 100th career home run off of Humberto Mejía of the Arizona Diamondbacks. For the season he hit .306 with 16 homers and 57 RBIs. In the postseason, he was hitless in three at-bats in the Wild Card Game, had five hits in 21 at-bats (.238 average) in the 2021 NLDS, and had four hits in 24 at-bats (.167) with two home runs in the 2021 NLCS.

=== Texas Rangers (2022–present) ===
On December 1, 2021, Seager signed a 10-year, $325 million contract with the Texas Rangers. The contract was the largest in Rangers franchise history, surpassing Alex Rodriguez's record $252 million deal set in 2000.

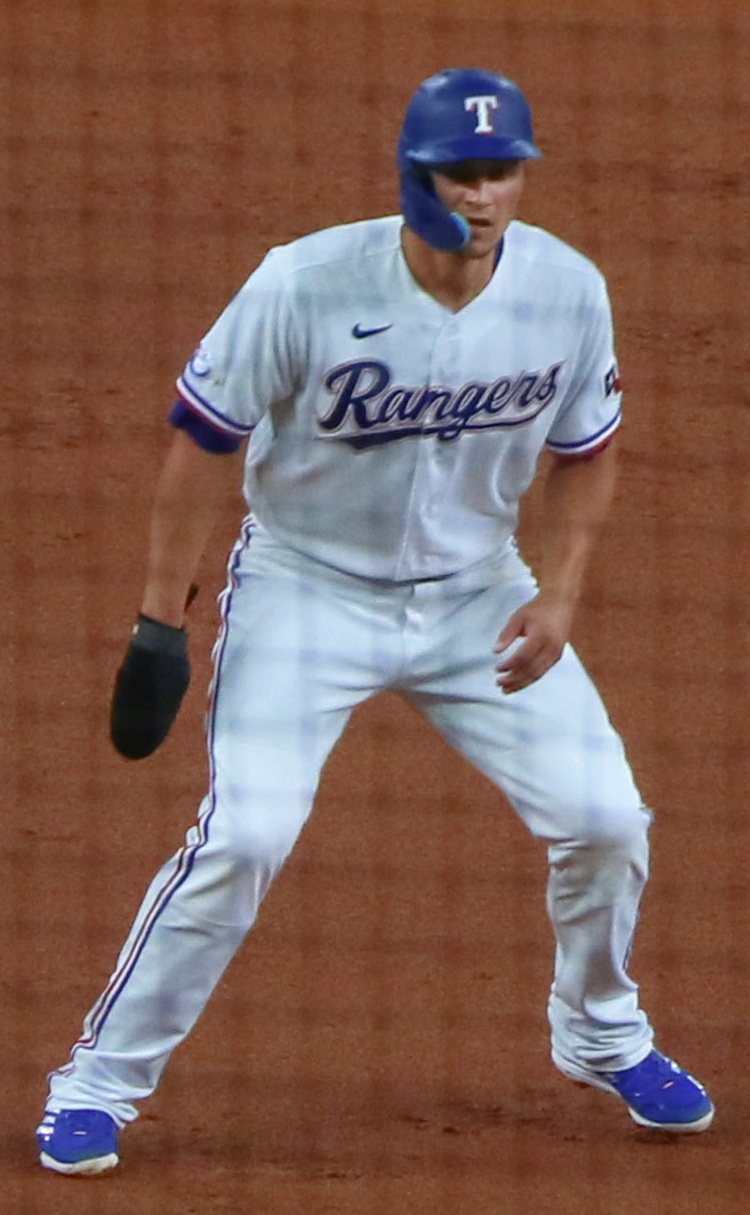
Seager in September 2022

In 2022, Seager batted .245/.317/.455 and had the lowest called-strike percentage of all major league batters (9.0%). Although his batting average was a career low .245, he did hit a career-high 33 home runs.

==== 2023: Postseason run and second World Series MVP ====
In 2023, Seager batted .327/.390/.623 with 33 home runs and a career-high 96 RBI, leading the AL in doubles (42) and percentage of balls hard-hit (48.4%). He was named to the All-Star team for the second straight year. He finished second in AL MVP Voting, behind Shohei Ohtani, and with his teammate Marcus Semien finishing third. In the 2023 World Series, Seager hit .286 with three home runs and six RBI to help the Rangers defeat the Arizona Diamondbacks in five games. He became the fourth player in history to win the World Series MVP award twice, joined Reggie Jackson as both the second position player and the second player to do so with two different teams, and became the first to win the award in both the American League and the National League.

==== 2024 ====
On August 29, Seager recorded his 200th career home run, against the Chicago White Sox. He became the first purely left-handed-hitting shortstop in Major League history to reach this milestone and the 15th shortstop overall.

On September 4, Seager was placed on the injured list due to right hip discomfort which was revealed as a sports hernia on his right side, and due to the injury, he would miss the remainder of the 2024 season. In 123 games, Seager hit .278/.353/.512 with 30 home runs and 74 RBI in 2024.

==== 2025 ====
In 102 games, Seager batted .271/.373/.487 with 21 home runs and 50 RBI in 2025.

== Personal life ==
Seager married Madisyn Van Ham on December 5, 2020. They began dating in high school.

== Awards and accomplishments ==
=== Awards ===
- All-Star Futures Game selection (2014)
- American League Player of the Week (5/27–6/04, 2023)
- Arizona Fall League Fall Stars selection (2013)
- Baseball America Triple-A Minor Leagues Player of the Year (2015)
- Baseball America Rookie of the Year (2016)
- California League Most Valuable Player (2014)
- Esurance MLB/This Year in Baseball Award winner as Best Rookie (2016)
- Home Run Derby participant (2016)
- 4x Major League Baseball All-Star selection (2016, 2017, 2022, 2023)
- National League Rookie of the Month (June 2016)
- National League Rookie of the Year (2016)
- National League Championship Series Most Valuable Player (2020)
- National League Player of the Week (9/15-9/21, 2019)
- Players Choice Award for National League Outstanding Rookie (2016)
- 3x Silver Slugger Award at shortstop (2016, 2017, 2023)
- The Sporting News National League Rookie of the Year (2016)
- Topps All-Star Rookie Team (2016)
- 2x World Series Most Valuable Player (2020, 2023)

=== Accomplishments ===
- MLB record for most homers by a left-handed shortstop in major league history (33 in 2022)
- Los Angeles Dodgers record for home runs hit by a shortstop in one season (26 in 2016)
- Los Angeles Dodgers record for first consecutive major league starts reaching base (16 on September 21, 2015)
- MLB record, shared with Kyle Seager, as first pair of brothers to each hit at least 25 home runs in the same season (2016)
- MLB record as youngest shortstop and sixth youngest overall to hit three home runs in one game (June 4, 2016)
- First shortstop to hit five home runs in a postseason series (in the 2020 National League Championship Series)
- Drew five walks in the 2023 ALDS Game 2 vs. the Baltimore Orioles to set a new MLB postseason single-game record
- First left-handed-hitting shortstop to reach 200 home runs (August 29, 2024, against Chicago White Sox)
