= 2017 National League Division Series =

American baseball games

Teams
Team (Wins)		Manager	Season
Los Angeles Dodgers (3)		Dave Roberts	104–58 (.642), GA: 11
Arizona Diamondbacks (0)		Torey Lovullo	93–69 (.574), GB: 11
- Dates: October 6–9
- Television: TBS
- TV announcers: Brian Anderson, Dennis Eckersley, and Joe Simpson
- Radio: ESPN
- Radio announcers: Dan Shulman and Aaron Boone
- Umpires: Phil Cuzzi, Gerry Davis (crew chief), Bill Miller, Paul Nauert, Alan Porter, Quinn Wolcott.

Teams
Team (Wins)		Manager	Season
Chicago Cubs (3)		Joe Maddon	92–70 (.568), GA: 6
Washington Nationals (2)		Dusty Baker	97–65 (.599), GA: 20
- Dates: October 6–12
- Television: TBS
- TV announcers: Ernie Johnson and Ron Darling
- Radio: ESPN
- Radio announcers: Dave Flemming and Jessica Mendoza
- Umpires: Cory Blaser, Fieldin Culbreth, Laz Díaz, Ron Kulpa, Jerry Layne (crew chief), (Note: Umpire Jeff Kellogg was originally scheduled to officiate the Cubs-Nationals series, but was replaced by Jerry Layne after Kellogg suffered a head injury during the final week of the 2017 regular season) Will Little
- NLWC: Arizona Diamondbacks defeated Colorado Rockies, 11–8

The 2017 National League Division Series were two best-of-five playoff series on the National League side in Major League Baseball’s 2017 postseason to determine the participating teams of the 2017 National League Championship Series. The three divisional winners (seeded 1–3) and a fourth team—the winner of a one-game Wild Card playoff— played in two series.

These matchups were:

- (1) Los Angeles Dodgers (NL West champions) vs. (4) Arizona Diamondbacks (Wild Card Game winner): Dodgers won the series, 3–0.
- (2) Washington Nationals (NL East champions) vs. (3) Chicago Cubs (NL Central champions): Cubs won the series, 3–2.

The higher seeded team in each series hosted Games 1, 2, and 5 (if necessary), and the lower seeded team hosted Games 3 and 4 (if necessary).

The Dodgers would go on to defeat the Cubs in the NLCS, then lose the 2017 World Series to the American League champion Houston Astros.

For the first time, Major League Baseball sold presenting sponsorships to all of its postseason series; T-Mobile US acquired presenting sponsorship to the NLDS, and thus the series was officially known as the National League Division Series presented by T-Mobile.

== Matchups ==
=== Los Angeles Dodgers vs. Arizona Diamondbacks ===
Los Angeles won the series, 3–0.

Game	Date	Score	Location	Time	Attendance
1	October 6	Arizona Diamondbacks – 5, Los Angeles Dodgers – 9	Dodger Stadium	3:37	54,707
2	October 7	Arizona Diamondbacks – 5, Los Angeles Dodgers – 8	Dodger Stadium	3:48	54,726
3	October 9	Los Angeles Dodgers – 3, Arizona Diamondbacks – 1	Chase Field	3:36	48,641

=== Washington Nationals vs. Chicago Cubs ===
Chicago won the series, 3–2.

Game	Date	Score	Location	Time	Attendance
1	October 6	Chicago Cubs – 3, Washington Nationals – 0	Nationals Park	3:02	43,898
2	October 7	Chicago Cubs – 3, Washington Nationals – 6	Nationals Park	3:06	43,860
3	October 9	Washington Nationals – 1, Chicago Cubs – 2	Wrigley Field	3:09	42,445
4	October 11 (Note: Originally scheduled for Tuesday, October 10, but postponed due to weather.)	Washington Nationals – 5, Chicago Cubs – 0	Wrigley Field	3:57	42,264
5	October 12	Chicago Cubs – 9, Washington Nationals – 8	Nationals Park	4:37	43,849

== Los Angeles vs. Arizona ==
This was the first postseason meeting between these two division rivals, and the 16th time that teams from Phoenix and Los Angeles met in a postseason in the four major North American sports leagues. The teams played each other 19 times during the regular season, with the Diamondbacks winning 11 of the games.

=== Game 1 ===
October 6, 2017 7:20 pm (PDT) at Dodger Stadium in Los Angeles, California, 79 °F (26 °C), clear
Team	1	2	3	4	5	6	7	8	9	R	H	E
Arizona	0	0	1	0	0	1	2	0	1	5	8	2
Los Angeles	4	0	0	3	0	0	0	2	X	9	12	2
WP: Clayton Kershaw (1–0) LP: Taijuan Walker (0–1); Home runs: AZ: A. J. Pollock (1), J. D. Martinez (1), Ketel Marte (1), Jeff Mathis (1); LAD: Justin Turner (1); Attendance: 54,707; Boxscore

Clayton Kershaw started for the Dodgers and he struck out seven in 6 1/3 innings. He also allowed four home runs (to A. J. Pollock in the third, J. D. Martinez in the sixth, and Ketel Marte and Jeff Mathis in the seventh), the first National League pitcher to ever do so in a postseason game. The Dodgers got to Diamondbacks starter Taijuan Walker early, as Justin Turner followed a leadoff single and walk with a three-run home run. Later in the inning, Cody Bellinger singled and scored on Yasiel Puig's double. Walker was replaced after the first inning by Zack Godley, who pitched five innings of relief while allowing three more runs to score, all in the fourth when Corey Seager and Justin Turner hit back-to-back RBI singles after a leadoff single and walk, then an error loaded the bases before Puig's groundout scored another run. In the eighth, Austin Barnes hit a leadoff single off Andrew Chafin, who was relieved by Jimmie Sherfy. Seager's triple and Turner's single scored a run each to extend the Dodgers' lead to 9–4. Turner had five RBIs in the game, tying Pedro Guerrero (1981) and Davey Lopes (1978) for the Dodgers single game postseason record. Kenley Jansen allowed a run in the ninth on Jake Lamb's groundout with two on before getting David Peralta to line out to end the game as the Dodgers held on to win, 9–5.

=== Game 2 ===
October 7, 2017 6:08 pm (PDT) at Dodger Stadium in Los Angeles, California, 83 °F (28 °C), clear
Team	1	2	3	4	5	6	7	8	9	R	H	E
Arizona	2	0	0	0	0	0	3	0	0	5	7	1
Los Angeles	0	1	0	2	4	0	1	0	X	8	12	0
WP: Kenta Maeda (1–0) LP: Robbie Ray (0–1) Sv: Kenley Jansen (1); Home runs: AZ: Paul Goldschmidt (1), Brandon Drury (1); LAD: None; Attendance: 54,726; Boxscore

Game 2 featured a match-up of two left handed starters: Rich Hill, who struggled against Arizona in 2017, against Robbie Ray, who came into Game 2's start 3–0 in five starts with 53 strikeouts against Los Angeles this season. Paul Goldschmidt started the scoring by hitting a two-run home run after a walk in the first inning, but those were the only runs Hill allowed in four innings of work. Ray, who pitched in relief just two days earlier in the wild card game, struggled with command throughout. He struck out six, but walked four, threw three wild pitches, and allowed four runs in 4 1/3 innings. The Dodgers got on the board in the second on two walks, a wild pitch and Yasiel Puig's RBI groundout. In the fourth, three singles loaded the bases with one out for the Dodgers before another wild pitch by Ray tied the game. One out later, Chris Taylor's RBI single put the Dodgers up 3–2. Next inning, Logan Forsythe's RBI single off Jimmie Sherfy made it 4–2 Dodgers. After a stolen base, Austin Barnes's two-run double made it 6–2 Dodgers. Jorge De La Rosa relieved Sherfy and allowed an RBI single to Puig. In the seventh, Tony Watson allowed back-to-back leadoff singles before Brandon Drury's three-run home run off Brandon Morrow cut the Dodgers' lead to 7–5. The Dodgers got a run in the bottom of the inning on Ketel Marte's fielding error on Chris Taylor's groundball off Archie Bradley. Puig and Forsythe each had three hits, while Puig and Barnes batted in two runs each. Kenta Maeda picked up the win in relief with Kenley Jansen earning his first save of the series.

=== Game 3 ===
October 9, 2017 7:08 pm (MST) at Chase Field in Phoenix, Arizona, 84 °F (29 °C), clear
Team	1	2	3	4	5	6	7	8	9	R	H	E
Los Angeles	1	0	0	0	1	1	0	0	0	3	7	0
Arizona	0	0	0	0	1	0	0	0	0	1	3	0
WP: Yu Darvish (1–0) LP: Zack Greinke (0–1) Sv: Kenley Jansen (2); Home runs: LAD: Cody Bellinger (1), Austin Barnes (1); AZ: Daniel Descalso (1); Attendance: 48,641; Boxscore

In game three, at Chase Field, Yu Darvish struck out seven and allowed only two hits and one run (a home run by Daniel Descalso in the fifth). Meanwhile, Zack Greinke labored through his five innings, walking five and giving up four hits and three runs (two on homers by Cody Bellinger in the fifth and Austin Barnes in the sixth, the other run came in the first on Bellinger's groundout with two on). The bullpens kept the game there and the Dodgers won the game 3–1, completing the sweep of the Diamondbacks and making their third trip to the NLCS in five years. Jansen earned his second save of the postseason by striking out Goldschmidt to end it. Arizona's defeat marked the first time in franchise history they lost an elimination game at Chase Field (winning Game 5 of the 2001 NLDS, games 6 and 7 of the World Series of that same year, games 3 and 4 of the 2011 Division Series, and the 2017 National League Wild Card Game). The Dodgers were the first National League team to sweep an LDS since the 2010 Phillies.

=== Composite line score ===
2017 NLDS (3–0): Los Angeles Dodgers defeated Arizona Diamondbacks.

Team	1	2	3	4	5	6	7	8	9	R	H	E
Arizona Diamondbacks	2	0	1	0	1	1	5	0	1	11	18	3
Los Angeles Dodgers	5	1	0	5	5	1	1	2	0	20	31	2
Total attendance: 158,074 Average attendance: 52,691

== Washington vs. Chicago ==
This was the first postseason meeting between the Nationals and Cubs.

=== Game 1 ===
October 6, 2017 7:50 pm (EDT) at Nationals Park in Washington, D.C., 77 °F (25 °C), cloudy
Team	1	2	3	4	5	6	7	8	9	R	H	E
Chicago	0	0	0	0	0	2	0	1	0	3	5	1
Washington	0	0	0	0	0	0	0	0	0	0	2	1
WP: Kyle Hendricks (1–0) LP: Stephen Strasburg (0–1) Sv: Wade Davis (1); Attendance: 43,898; Boxscore

Game 1 featured a pitching duel between Kyle Hendricks and Stephen Strasburg, with the game being scoreless through five innings. The Cubs, who were held without a hit in the first five innings, were led off in the sixth with Javier Báez reaching on an error by the sure handed Anthony Rendon on a ball that was ruled just fair. Kris Bryant drove home Báez on a two-out RBI single (the first hit by the Cubs on the night) advancing to second on the throw. The very next batter, Anthony Rizzo, singled home Bryant to make it 2–0 in favor of the Cubs. The Cubs added one more run in the eighth when Jon Jay hit a leadoff double off Ryan Madson and scored on Anthony Rizzo's double, as Hendricks threw seven scoreless innings giving up just two hits, with the bullpen tossing two scoreless as the Cubs took Game 1 by a score of 3–0.

=== Game 2 ===
October 7, 2017 5:38 pm (EDT) at Nationals Park in Washington, D.C., 82 °F (28 °C), partly cloudy
Team	1	2	3	4	5	6	7	8	9	R	H	E
Chicago	0	1	0	2	0	0	0	0	0	3	6	0
Washington	1	0	0	0	0	0	0	5	X	6	6	0
WP: Óliver Pérez (1–0) LP: Carl Edwards Jr. (0–1) Sv: Sean Doolittle (1); Home runs: CHC: Willson Contreras (1), Anthony Rizzo (1); WSH: Anthony Rendon (1), Bryce Harper (1), Ryan Zimmerman (1); Attendance: 43,860; Boxscore

The Nationals scored their first run of the series on a first-inning home run by Anthony Rendon off Cubs' starter Jon Lester. However, in the top of the second, the Cubs struck right back, as the first batter of the inning, Willson Contreras homered off Nationals' starter Gio González. The Cubs took the lead in the top of the fourth on a two-run home run by Anthony Rizzo. In the bottom of the fifth, Lester loaded the bases with two outs but got out of the jam by getting Trea Turner to chase to end the threat. In the bottom of the eighth, Adam Lind led off with a pinch-hit single before Bryce Harper homered off Carl Edwards Jr. to tie the game at 3–3. Edwards walked Anthony Rendon, then Mike Montgomery allowed a single to Daniel Murphy before Ryan Zimmerman hit a three-run home run to put the Nationals up 6–3. Sean Doolittle retired the Cubs in order in the ninth to tie the series at one, heading to Wrigley Field.

=== Game 3 ===
October 9, 2017 3:08 pm (CDT) at Wrigley Field in Chicago, Illinois, 76 °F (24 °C), partly cloudy
Team	1	2	3	4	5	6	7	8	9	R	H	E
Washington	0	0	0	0	0	1	0	0	0	1	3	1
Chicago	0	0	0	0	0	0	1	1	x	2	4	4
WP: Carl Edwards Jr. (1–1) LP: Brandon Kintzler (0–1) Sv: Wade Davis (2); Attendance: 42,445; Boxscore

Game 3 featured another pitchers' duel, this time between José Quintana of the Cubs and Max Scherzer of the Nationals. The game featured sloppy defense by the Cubs, as they committed four errors on the game. Two of them came in the top of the sixth with two outs, as Daniel Murphy hit a fly ball to left field that was dropped and kicked around by Kyle Schwarber, allowing Murphy to reach third base. Reliever Pedro Strop came in to face Ryan Zimmerman, but Zimmerman doubled home the game's first run. Meanwhile, Scherzer had not allowed a hit in the first 6 1/3 innings pitched, when Ben Zobrist doubled, to chase Scherzer from the game. The Nationals brought in lefty reliever Sammy Solis to face Schwarber, but the Cubs sent pinch hitter Albert Almora to hit, and he singled home Zobrist to tie the game at 1–1. In the bottom of the eighth, Tommy La Stella drew a leadoff walk off Brandon Kintzler, then moved to second on a sacrifice bunt. One out later, Óliver Pérez was summoned in to face Anthony Rizzo, but he hit a bloop single to left-center field scoring Leonys Martín. Carl Edwards Jr. earned the win with a perfect eighth and Wade Davis got the save with a perfect ninth as the Cubs won the game 2–1, and took a 2–1 lead in the series.

=== Game 4 ===
October 11, 2017 3:08 pm (CDT) at Wrigley Field in Chicago, Illinois, 59 °F (15 °C), drizzle
Team	1	2	3	4	5	6	7	8	9	R	H	E
Washington	0	0	1	0	0	0	0	4	0	5	5	1
Chicago	0	0	0	0	0	0	0	0	0	0	3	2
WP: Stephen Strasburg (1–1) LP: Jake Arrieta (0–1); Home runs: WSH: Michael A. Taylor (1); CHC: None; Attendance: 42,264; Boxscore

Game 4 was originally scheduled to be played on Tuesday, October 10, but was postponed due to rain. The Nationals were going to use their fourth starter, Tanner Roark to try to save their season, but with the extra rest day, had the opportunity to use their ace, Stephen Strasburg on normal rest. Initially, it was announced that Strasburg was feeling under the weather, but he eventually did make the start. The Cubs stuck to their scheduled starter, Jake Arrieta, who was making possibly his final start as a Cub before entering free agency. Although the field conditions were playable, the wind was blowing in, and it was raining much throughout, making it difficult to hit the ball well. The Nationals scored first, as with two on and two out in the top of the fourth, Ryan Zimmerman hit a ground ball to shortstop Addison Russell who had trouble handling it. This allowed Zimmerman to reach safely and Trea Turner to score. Arrieta lasted four innings before Game 2 starter Jon Lester took the ball. Lester retired the first 10 batters he faced before giving up a walk to Zimmerman. However, with Daniel Murphy batting, Lester, who rarely throws to first base, tried to pick off Zimmerman at first. The play was close, but Zimmerman was ruled safe. Replays showed that while Zimmerman beat the throw to the base, his foot might have came off the base while first basemen Anthony Rizzo's tag was still being applied. Cubs' manager Joe Maddon challenged the call, and it was reversed. Regardless, Murphy singled to right-center to end Lester's outing. Carl Edwards Jr. came on to face Anthony Rendon. Edwards surrendered a wild pitch, but Rendon drew a walk. The next batter, Matt Wieters walked to load the bases. Maddon brought in his closer Wade Davis to face Michael Taylor. Taylor hit a fly ball to right field that barely got out to make it 5–0. Meanwhile, Strasburg pitched well, tossing seven innings, striking out twelve while giving up just three hits and two walks. Ryan Madson and Sean Doolittle held the Cubs scoreless as the Nationals won to stave off elimination.

=== Game 5 ===
October 12, 2017 8:08 pm (EDT) at Nationals Park in Washington, D.C., 62 °F (17 °C), cloudy
Team	1	2	3	4	5	6	7	8	9	R	H	E
Chicago	1	0	2	0	4	1	1	0	0	9	9	0
Washington	0	4	0	0	0	2	1	1	0	8	14	2
WP: Brian Duensing (1–0) LP: Max Scherzer (0–1) Sv: Wade Davis (3); Home runs: CHC: None; WSH: Daniel Murphy (1), Michael A. Taylor (2); Attendance: 43,849; Boxscore

With both teams' seasons on the line, the Cubs brought back Game 1 starter and winning pitcher Kyle Hendricks while the Nationals countered with Game 2 starter Gio González, who got a no decision. The Cubs struck first in the top of the first off González with an RBI groundout by Anthony Rizzo, scoring Jon Jay. In the bottom of the second, Daniel Murphy led off the inning by hitting the first pitch from Hendricks into the stands to tie the game at 1–1. After two straight singles, Michael Taylor hit his second homer of the series in as many at bats to give the Nationals a 4–1 lead. The Cubs struck back in the top of the third. With the bases load and one out, Addison Russell grounded out, scoring Kris Bryant. The next batter was Jason Heyward, but with Heyward batting, González uncorked a wild pitch, scoring Willson Contreras, cutting the Nationals' lead to one.

González lasted just three innings, as Matt Albers came on in the top of the fourth and pitched a 1-2-3 inning. In the top of the fifth, Nationals' Game 3 starter Max Scherzer came on to pitch. After getting the first two batters out, Contreras had a two-out single. The next batter, Ben Zobrist, pinch hit for Albert Almora Jr. and he also hit a single. The next batter, Russell hit a double to left field scoring both Contreras and Zobrist, as the Cubs took a 5–4 lead. After an intentional walk to Heyward, Javier Báez struck out, but catcher Matt Wieters gave up a passed ball. Wieters tried to complete the strikeout by throwing to first base, but the ball got by both first basemen Ryan Zimmerman and second basemen Murphy, allowing Russell to score, and the other runners moving up. The next batter, Tommy La Stella pinch hit for Hendricks, and he fouled off a ball late, hitting Wieters' glove, allowing him to reach via catcher's interference. The next batter, who was the ninth batter of the inning, Jay, was hit by a pitch which forced in a run to make it 7–4 Cubs.

The Cubs added one more run in the top of the sixth to make it 8–4 Cubs, but the Nationals struck back in the bottom half. After the first two batters were retired, Jayson Werth drew a walk off Cubs' reliever Pedro Strop. Mike Montgomery came on to pitch, and he surrendered a double to Bryce Harper. Then on a full count to Zimmerman, Montgomery threw a wild pitch which got by catcher Contreras, allowing Werth to score, and Zimmerman to reach. The next batter, Murphy, doubled to left allowing Harper to score, cutting the Cubs' lead to two. The Cubs got one back in the top of the seventh on Bryant's RBI groundout, scoring Kyle Schwarber. In the bottom of the seventh, Cubs' setup man Carl Edwards Jr. pitched, but walked his only batter, Taylor. Maddon brought in Game 3 starter José Quintana. After retiring the first batter he faced (José Lobatón), the next two batters, Trea Turner and Werth reached to load the bases. A sacrifice fly by Harper cut the Cubs' lead to 9–7. With Zimmerman due up, Maddon brought on his closer Wade Davis to retire Zimmerman, ending the threat and the inning.

Davis came back out there in the bottom of the eighth. After surrendering leadoff walks to Murphy and Anthony Rendon, Adam Lind pinch hit for pitcher Ryan Madson. Lind, who started the rally in Game 2, grounded into a double play, with Murphy to third base. It turned out to be the last plate appearance of Lind's 12-year career. However, Taylor singled up the middle to score Murphy, cutting the Cubs' lead to one. In the bottom of the ninth, Davis returned to the mound, trying to get the seven out save. He got it, retiring Turner and striking out Werth and Harper swinging to end the game and series, Cubs winning the game 9–8.

Davis recorded his record-tying third save of the series (Aroldis Chapman was the last closer to do accomplish this, doing this in the 2016 NLDS). He is only the third reliever to have gone 3-for-3 in save opportunities in a Division Series, with Dennis Eckersley and Mark Wohlers having accomplished the feat both in the 1996 National League Division Series. This was the Nationals' fourth postseason series loss in six years, while the Cubs advanced to the NLCS for the third consecutive year. Fourteen pitchers were used in the game. The game lasted four hours and 37 minutes, the longest 9-inning postseason game in major league history, beating the record set in last year's postseason, which was also a Game 5 between the Dodgers and Nationals, which the Dodgers won 4–3.

In a surprising move considering his success with the club, the Nationals fired Dusty Baker after the series loss.

=== Composite line score ===
2017 NLDS (3–2): Chicago Cubs defeated Washington Nationals.

Team	1	2	3	4	5	6	7	8	9	R	H	E
Chicago Cubs	1	1	2	2	4	3	2	2	0	17	27	7
Washington Nationals	1	4	1	0	0	3	1	10	0	20	30	5
Total attendance: 216,316 Average attendance: 43,263

== See also ==
- 2017 American League Division Series
