= Kyle Hendricks =

American baseball player (born 1989)

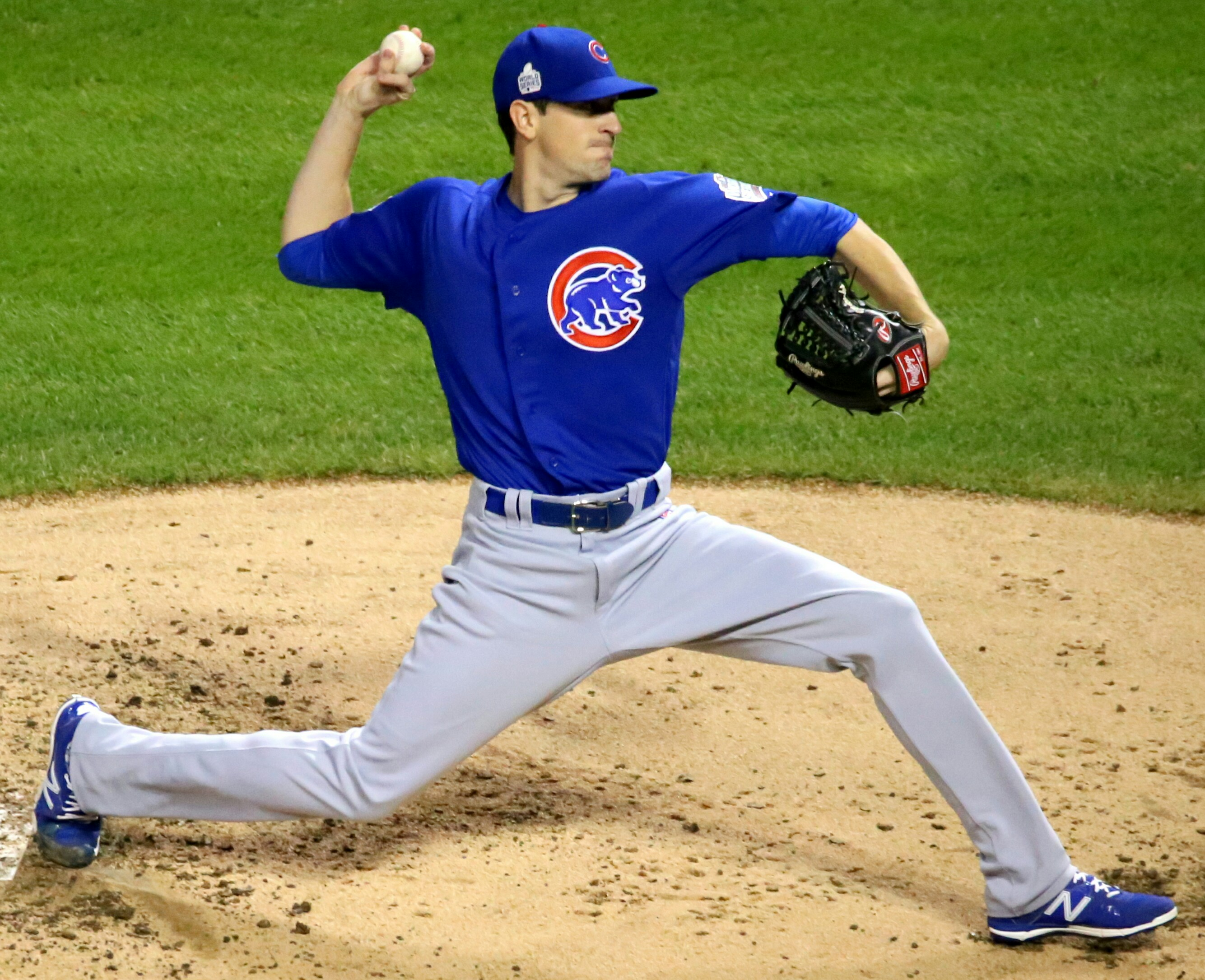
- Hendricks with the Chicago Cubs in 2016
- Pitcher
- Born: December 7, 1989 (age 36); Newport Beach, California, U.S.
- Batted: Right Threw: Right

MLB debut
- July 10, 2014, for the Chicago Cubs

Last appearance
- September 26, 2025, for the Los Angeles Angels

MLB statistics
- Win–loss record: 105–91
- Earned run average: 3.79
- Strikeouts: 1,373
- Stats at Baseball Reference

Teams
- Chicago Cubs (2014–2024); Los Angeles Angels (2025)

Career highlights and awards
- World Series champion (2016); MLB ERA leader (2016)

Kyle Christian Hendricks (born December 7, 1989) is an American former professional baseball pitcher who played 12 seasons in Major League Baseball (MLB) for the Chicago Cubs and Los Angeles Angels and is currently a special assistant inside the Detroit Tigers organization. He made his MLB debut in 2014 with the Cubs and led MLB in earned run average (ERA) in 2016, winning the World Series that same year.

== Amateur career ==
Hendricks attended Capistrano Valley High School in Mission Viejo, California. He was drafted by the Los Angeles Angels in the 39th round of the 2008 MLB draft, but did not sign and instead chose to attend Dartmouth College, where he was a member of the Beta Alpha Omega fraternity.

He played college baseball for the Dartmouth Big Green under head coach Bob Whalen. In his junior year, Hendricks pitched to a 6–3 win–loss record and a 2.47 earned run average with 70 strikeouts in 62 innings pitched. In 2010, he played collegiate summer baseball with the Brewster Whitecaps of the Cape Cod Baseball League.

== Professional career ==
=== Texas Rangers ===
The Texas Rangers drafted Hendricks in the eighth round, with the 264th overall selection, of the 2011 Major League Baseball draft. He signed with the Rangers, and began his professional career with the Spokane Indians of the Low–A Northwest League.

=== Chicago Cubs ===
The Cubs acquired Hendricks alongside Christian Villanueva in exchange for Ryan Dempster at the 2012 trade deadline. Hendricks began the 2013 season with the Tennessee Smokies of the Double–A Southern League, and the Cubs promoted him to the Iowa Cubs of the Triple–A Pacific Coast League (PCL) during the season. The Cubs named Hendricks their minor league pitcher of the year for 2013.

Hendricks began the 2014 season with Iowa. He was named the PCL's Pitcher of the Week for May 12–18.

==== 2014: Rookie season ====
After the trade of Jeff Samardzija and Jason Hammel to the Oakland Athletics on July 4, 2014, Hendricks made his Major League Baseball debut with the Chicago Cubs on July 10, against the Cincinnati Reds at Great American Ballpark. He earned his first win in front of a home crowd against the San Diego Padres on July 22. Hendricks was named the National League Rookie of the Month of August. Hendricks finished his rookie season with a 7–2 win–loss record and a 2.46 ERA. Hendricks tied for seventh place with Travis d'Arnaud and Jeurys Familia in the NL Rookie of the Year Award voting.

==== 2015 ====
Hendricks began the 2015 season as a member of the Cubs' starting rotation, led by the newly signed Jon Lester.

His record was 8–7 with 180 innings pitched and he had an ERA of 3.95. His 17 no decisions were the most among MLB starting pitchers in 2015. He was the starter for game two of the 2015 National League Division Series with St. Louis and game three in the 2015 National League Championship Series against the New York Mets.

==== 2016: World Series champion ====
Hendricks was named NL Pitcher of the Month for August.

Hendricks finished the 2016 season with a record of 16–8 in 190 innings pitched and an ERA of 2.13, which was the lowest in all of baseball. He was the first Cub to lead the National League in the stat since 1945 and the first to lead the majors since 1938. He also led all major league pitchers in first-strike percentage (68.6%).

In Game 6 of the NLCS, Hendricks pitched 7 1/3 innings facing the minimum in the clinching game to send the Cubs to their first World Series since 1945. The Cubs won the 2016 World Series over the Cleveland Indians, with Hendricks as the starting pitcher in Games 3 and 7, giving them their first title in 108 years.

==== 2017 ====
On June 8, 2017, Hendricks was placed on the 10-day disabled list (transaction retroactive three days prior) due to middle finger tendon inflammation in his right hand.

He finished the season with a 7–5 record and a 3.03 ERA over 139.2 innings. He tied for the major league lead in pickoffs, with seven, while allowing 13 stolen bases and having four caught stealing. Hendricks pitched Games 1 and 5 of the NLDS, and Game 3 of the NLCS. Across the three games, he was 1–1 with a 3.94 ERA in a combined 17 innings.

==== 2018 ====
In 2018, he was 14–11 with a 3.44 ERA and led all major league pitchers in changeup percentage (30.7%). He was the losing pitcher in the NL Wild Card Game, giving up three straight hits and one run in the 13th inning against the Colorado Rockies.

==== 2019: Contract extension ====
On March 26, 2019, Hendricks and the Cubs agreed to a four-year contract extension through the 2023 season with a vesting option for the 2024 season. Hendricks picked up his first career Maddux with an 81-pitch victory over the Cardinals on May 3. Hendricks, who was already aware of the term, stated, "Lucky I got one. Every time I go out there, I'm trying to get early contact and get early outs. When it happens to go this way, you can say, 'Look, I did it!'"

He finished the season with an 11–10 record with a 3.46 ERA across 177 innings, with the lowest BB/9 rate he had up to this point in his career.

==== 2020 ====
On July 24, 2020, Hendricks pitched a complete-game shutout in the Cubs' season opener versus the Brewers, only throwing 103 pitches with three hits allowed, nine strikeouts, and no walks. It was the first Opening Day shutout by a Cubs pitcher since Bill Bonham in 1974, and the first Opening Day shutout in MLB since Clayton Kershaw in 2013.

In 2020 he was 6–5 with a 2.88 ERA. He led the NL in fewest walks per 9 IP (0.885), and in strikeout/walk ratio (8.000), and was eighth in losses. Hendricks also finished ninth in Cy Young voting, tying Zac Gallen and Clayton Kershaw in the process.

==== 2021 ====
On April 18, 2021, in a game against the Atlanta Braves, Hendricks allowed home runs to Freddie Freeman, Travis d'Arnaud, Ehire Adrianza, and Guillermo Heredia all in the first inning, becoming the first pitcher in Cubs history to allow four home runs in the first inning, and only the ninth player in history to accomplish the feat. He finished the 2021 season with a 14–7 record, a 4.77 ERA and an MLB-leading 200 hits allowed.

==== 2022: Shoulder injury ====
In 16 starts for Chicago in 2022, Hendricks registered a 4–6 record and 4.80 ERA with 66 strikeouts in 84 1/3 innings pitched. His last start was made on July 5, after which it was discovered that he suffered a capsular tear in his shoulder and would miss the remainder of the season.

==== 2023 ====
Hendricks returned from his injury to make 24 starts for Chicago in 2023. Spanning 137 innings, he compiled a 6–8 record and 3.74 ERA with 93 strikeouts.

==== 2024: Final season in Chicago ====
The highest ERA by a Cub in his first five starts of a season was set by Hendricks at the start of the 2024 season with a 12.00 ERA. After continued struggles, Hendricks was moved to the bullpen on May 21, 2024. In 29 total games (24 starts) for the Cubs in 2024, he compiled a 4–12 record and 5.92 ERA with 87 strikeouts across 130.2 innings pitched. On October 31, Hendricks elected to become a free agent.

=== Los Angeles Angels ===
==== 2025: Final MLB season ====
On November 6, 2024, Hendricks signed a one-year, $2.5 million contract with the Los Angeles Angels. On June 7, 2025, Hendricks pitched against Seattle Mariners and recorded his 100th career win. Manager Ron Washington praised Hendricks' performance, noting that his performance was much better than his ERA indicated. In 31 starts for Los Angeles, he logged an 8-10 record and 4.76 ERA with 114 strikeouts across 164 2/3 innings pitched.

Hendricks announced his retirement from Major League Baseball on November 10, 2025.

== Post-playing career ==
On April 29, 2026, it was announced that Hendricks would join the front office of the Detroit Tigers as special assistant to president Scott Harris, where his work will focus on pitching development. His relationship with Harris and Tigers general manager Jeff Greenburg date back to their time in the Chicago Cubs organization.

== Personal life ==
Hendricks grew up in San Juan Capistrano, California. His father, John, is a golf pro; his mother, Ann Marie, is a medical management consultant. He earned his bachelor's degree in economics from Dartmouth College in December 2013, after completing his coursework in the winter of 2012 and fall of 2013. Hendricks is nicknamed "The Professor" by his teammates and fans. The nickname is not only a reference to Hendricks's Ivy League education, but also an homage to Greg Maddux, who also sported the same nickname. Hendricks chose "Hendo" as his nickname for the Players Weekend during the 2017 season.

Hendricks married longtime girlfriend Emma Cain in November 2017.
