= List of Asian-American firsts =

Asian Americans are Americans of Asian descent. The phrase Asian American was coined by Emma Gee and Yuji Ichioka in 1968 during the founding of the Asian American Political Alliance, and started to be used by the U.S. census in 1980.

Firsts by Asian Americans in various fields have historically marked footholds, often leading to more widespread cultural change. The shorthand phrase for them is "breaking the color barrier". One commonly cited example is that of Wataru Misaka, who became the first person of color, and the first Asian American, to be a National Basketball Association player (in 1947.)

== Arts and entertainment ==
=== Academy Awards ===
- 1955: James Wong Howe becomes the first Asian American to win an Academy Award, the Academy Award for Best Cinematography for The Rose Tattoo.
- 1957: Miyoshi Umeki becomes the first Asian American to win the Academy Award for Best Supporting Actress, for Sayonara.
- 1984: Haing Somnang Ngor becomes the first Asian American to win the Academy Award for Best Supporting Actor, for The Killing Fields.
- 1990: Steven Okazaki becomes the first Asian American to win the Academy Award for Best Documentary (Short Subject), for Days of Waiting: The Life & Art Of Estelle Ishigo.
- 1997: Chris Tashima becomes the first Asian American to win the Academy Award for Best Live Action Short Film, for Visas and Virtue.
- 2019: Kazu Hiro becomes the first Asian American to win the Academy Award for Best Makeup and Hairstyling, for Bombshell. This was his first win following his naturalization.
- 2021: Steven Yeun becomes the first Asian American to be nominated for the Academy Award for Best Actor for Minari.
- 2022: Janet Yang is elected as the first Asian American President of the Academy of Motion Picture Arts and Sciences.

=== Fashion ===
- 2012: Alexander Wang becomes the first Asian American creative director and head of a French haute couture house (Balenciaga).

=== Film (aside from the Academy Awards) ===
- 1919-1961: Anna May Wong is considered to be the first major Asian American film star in the world.
- 2005: Dayyan Eng becomes the first Asian American director to have a film nominated for Best Picture at the Chinese academy awards (for Waiting Alone).
- 2018: John Cho becomes the first Asian American actor to headline a mainstream Hollywood thriller, Searching.
- 2020: Awkwafina becomes the first Asian American to win the Golden Globe Award for best actress in the musical or comedy category, for The Farewell.

=== Literature (aside from the Pulitzer and Nobel Prizes) ===
- 1928: Dhan Gopal Mukerji becomes the first Asian American to win a Newbery Medal, for Gay Neck, the Story of a Pigeon.
- 2025: Arthur Sze becomes the first Asian American United States Poet Laureate.

=== Music ===
- 1963: Larry Ramos becomes the first Asian American to win a Grammy Award, which he received alongside other members of The New Christy Minstrels.
- 1984: Yo-Yo Ma becomes the first individual Asian American to win a Grammy Award, winning "Best Classical Performance - Instrumental Soloist or Soloists (Without Orchestra)" for his album Bach: The Unaccompanied Cello Suites.
- 2010: Far East Movement becomes the first Asian American music group to earn a No. 1 on the Billboard Hot 100, for Like a G6.

=== Pulitzer Prizes ===
- 1937: Gobind Behari Lal becomes the first Asian American to win a Pulitzer Prize in Reporting.
- 1990: Sheryl WuDunn becomes the first Asian American woman to win a Pulitzer Prize in Reporting.

=== Television ===
- 1951: Anna May Wong becomes the first Asian American to lead a U.S. television show, with her work on The Gallery of Madame Liu-Tsong.
- 2018: Aziz Ansari becomes the first Asian American to win a Golden Globe for acting in television; specifically, he won the Golden Globe Award for Best Actor – Television Series Musical or Comedy for Master of None.
- 2019: Bowen Yang becomes the first cast member on Saturday Night Live of full Asian descent.

==== Reality television ====
- 2004: Jun Song becomes the first Asian American winner of Big Brother, winning Big Brother 4.
- 2006: Yul Kwon becomes the first Asian American winner of Survivor, winning the thirteenth season, Survivor: Cook Islands.
- 2024: Jenn Tran becomes the first Asian American Bachelorette in The Bachelorette, appearing in season 21.

=== Theater ===
- 1972: Frank Chin becomes the first Asian American to have a play produced on a major New York stage (the play is The Chickencoop Chinaman.)
- 1981: Willa Kim becomes the first Asian American to win a Tony Award, winning Best Costume Design in a Musical for Sophisticated Ladies.
- 1991: Lea Salonga becomes the first Asian American to win the Tony Award for Leading Actress in a Musical, playing Kim in Miss Saigon.
- 2025: Darren Criss becomes the first Asian American to win the Tony Award for Leading Actor in a Musical, playing Oliver in Maybe Happy Ending.

=== Other ===
- 2000: Angela Perez Baraquio Grey becomes the first Asian American to win the Miss America (2001) pageant.
- 2024: Bailey Anne Kennedy becomes the first Asian American to win the Miss Maryland USA (2024) pageant

== Business and commerce ==
- 1986: Gerald Tsai becomes the first Asian American CEO of a Fortune 500 company (The American Can Company; #140 on the 1986 list).
- 2013: Kevin Tsujihara becomes the first Asian American CEO of a major Hollywood studio (Warner Bros Entertainment).
- 2022: Rose Lee, current CEO of Cornerstone Building Brands, was elected by Honeywell International to be the newest member of their board of directors, becoming the first Korean American woman to sit on the board of a Fortune 100 company.

== Dentistry ==
- 2002: Dr. Eugene Sekiguchi is elected as the first Asian American president of the American Dental Association.

== Diplomacy ==
- 1989: Julia Chang Bloch becomes the first Asian American U.S. ambassador, as US Ambassador to Nepal.

== Education ==
- 1974: Fujio Matsuda becomes the first Asian American president of a major American university, as president of the University of Hawaiʻi.
- 1990: Chang-Lin Tien becomes the first Asian American to lead a major American research university, as Chancellor of UC Berkeley.
- 2009: Jim Yong Kim becomes the first Asian American president of an Ivy League institution, as president of Dartmouth College.

== Journalism ==
- 1937: Ella Kam Oon Chun becomes the first Asian American woman reporter on The Honolulu Advertiser.
- 1943: Ah Jook Ku becomes the first Asian American reporter for the Associated Press.
- 1970: Al Young becomes the first Asian American U.S. mainland sportswriter at a metro daily newspaper The Bridgeport (CT) Post-Telegram.
- 1993: Connie Chung becomes the first Asian American to anchor one of America's major network newscasts (CBS Evening News).

== Judiciary and politics ==
=== Federal ===
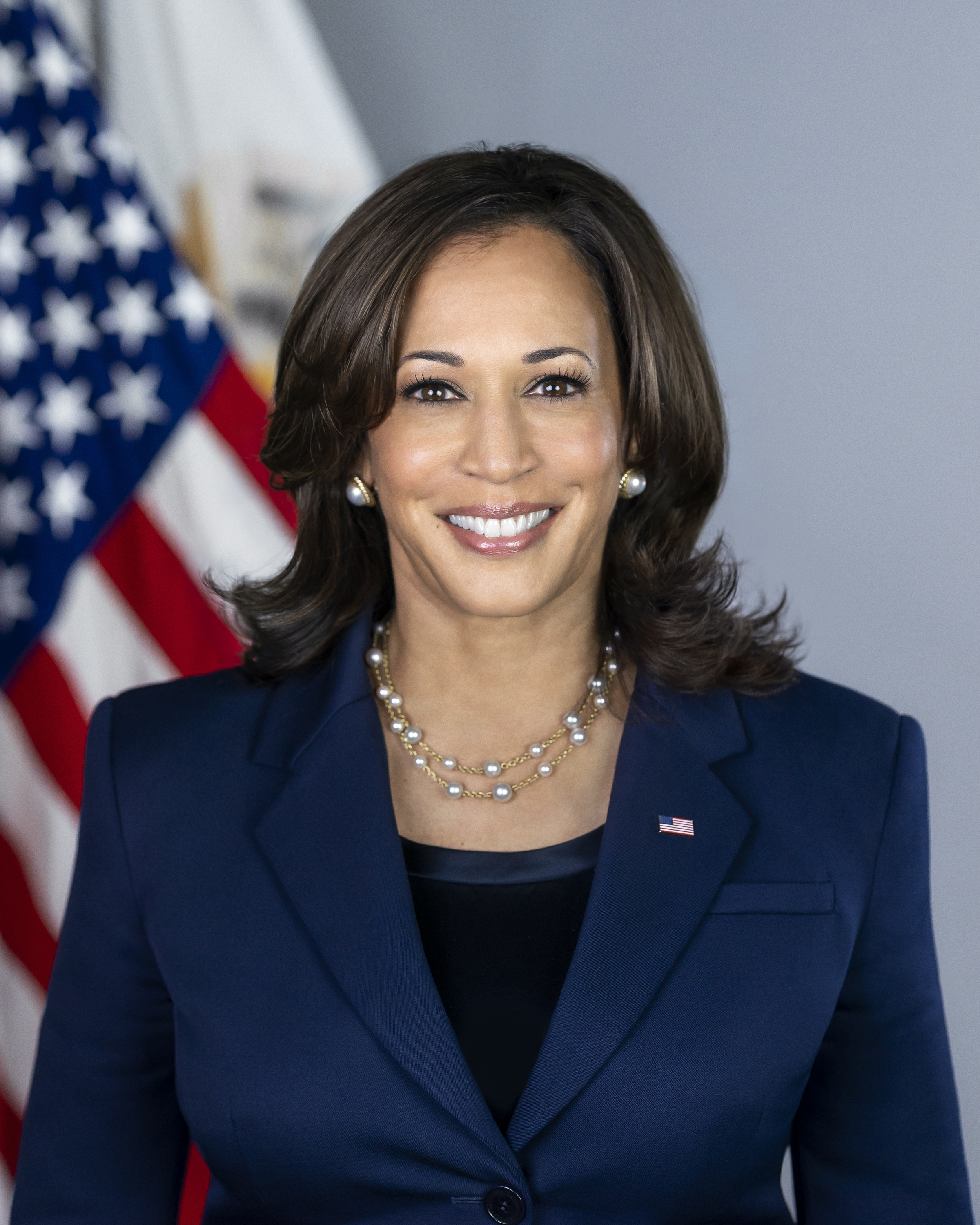
Official portrait of Vice President Kamala Harris, 2021

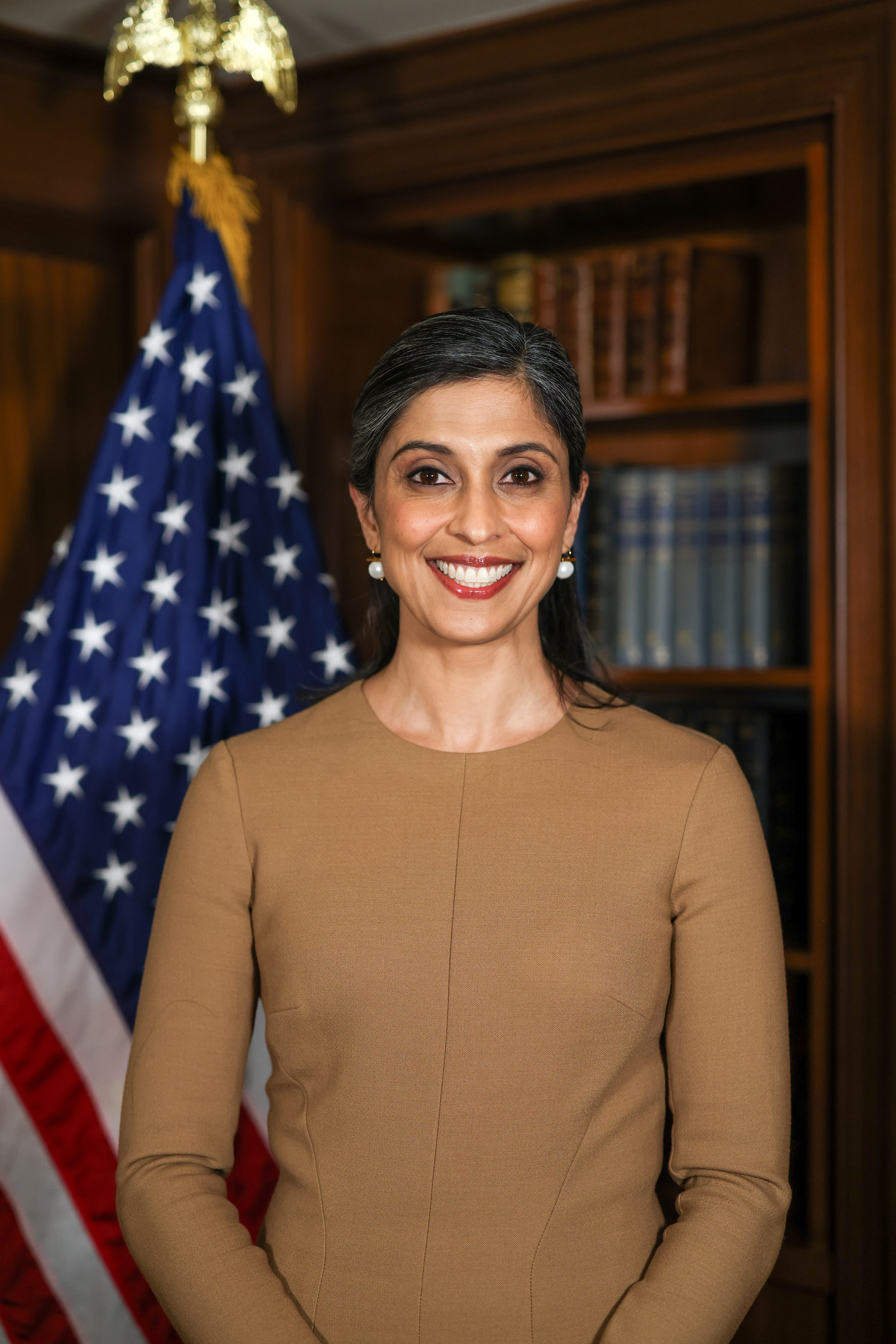
Official portrait of the Second Lady of the United States Usha Vance, 2025

- 1831 - William Hogan is the first member of Congress of documented Asian (Indian) ancestry.
- 1957: Dalip Singh Saund becomes the first Asian American elected to the United States Congress, as a Representative for California's 29th district.
- 1964: Hiram Fong becomes the first Asian American U.S. Senator.
- 1964: Hiram Fong becomes the first Asian American candidate for U.S. president.
- 1965: Patsy Mink becomes the first Asian American woman elected to the U.S. Congress.
- 1971: Herbert Choy becomes the first Asian American U.S. federal court judge, appointed to the U.S. court of appeals for the ninth circuit.
- 1972: Patsy Mink becomes the first Asian American Democratic candidate for U.S. president.
- 1984: Joy Cherian becomes the first Asian American Commissioner of the Equal Employment Opportunity Commission.
- 1998: Susan Oki Mollway became the first East Asian woman ever appointed to a life-time position on the federal bench.
- 2000: Norman Mineta becomes the first Asian American cabinet secretary being appointed as United States Secretary of Commerce.
- 2002: Kenneth P. Moritsugu becomes the first Asian American Surgeon General.
- 2010: Daniel Inouye becomes the first Asian American President pro tempore of the United States Senate, making him the highest-ranking Asian-American politician in American history until Kamala Harris becomes vice president.
- 2020: Kamala Harris becomes the first Asian American (and first African American) major party candidate for vice president.
- 2021: Kamala Harris becomes the first Asian American (and first African American) Vice President of the United States.
- 2021: Kamala Harris becomes the first Asian American President of the United States Senate.
- 2021: Kamala Harris becomes the first Asian American Acting President of the United States.
- 2024 Andy Kim becomes the first Korean American elected to and appointed early to (by a governor) the United States Senate from New Jersey
- 2024: Kamala Harris becomes the first Asian American major party candidate for president.
- 2025: Usha Vance becomes the first Asian American Second Lady of the United States.

=== State and local ===
- 1927: Kinjiro Matsudaira becomes the first Asian American mayor of a city (Edmonston, Maryland) in the United States.
- 1946: Wing F. Ong becomes the first Asian American to be elected to a state legislative body in the United States, in the Arizona House of Representatives.
- 1962: Patsy Mink becomes the first Asian American woman elected to a state legislative body in the United States, in the Hawaii State Senate
- 1971: Norman Mineta becomes the first Asian American mayor of a major city (San Jose, CA) in the United States.
- 1974: George Ariyoshi becomes the first Asian American governor of a U.S. state, becoming governor of Hawaii.
- 1996: Gary Locke is elected Governor of Washington, becoming first Asian American to be elected Governor of a mainland U.S. state.
- 2008: Bobby Jindal becomes the first Asian American Governor of Louisiana, as well as the first Indian American governor of a state.
- 2010: Nikki Haley becomes the first Asian American woman to become governor, becoming governor of South Carolina. She is also the first woman of color to become governor, alongside New Mexico Governor Susana Martinez.
- 2011: Ed Lee becomes the first Asian American Mayor of San Francisco.
- 2015: Yumi Hogan becomes the first Asian American First Lady of a U.S. State, being married to Maryland Governor Larry Hogan.
- 2021: Aftab Pureval becomes the first Asian American Mayor of Cincinnati.
- 2021: Michelle Wu becomes the first Asian American, person of color, and woman to be Mayor of Boston.
- 2023: Lily Wu becomes the first Asian American Mayor of Wichita, Kansas.
- 2024: Arunan Arulampalam becomes first Asian American Mayor of Hartford, Connecticut
- 2025: Zohran Mamdani becomes the first immigrant of South Asian ancestry and first Asian American Mayor of New York City.

== Military ==
- 1896: Charles J. Simons is the first Asian American to be awarded the Medal of Honor, for actions taken during the American Civil War.
- 1942: Susan Ahn Cuddy becomes the first Asian American woman in the U.S. Navy.
- 1944: Kurt Lee becomes the first Asian American officer in the Marine Corps.
- 1959: Gordon Chung-Hoon becomes the first Asian American flag officer in the United States Navy.
- 1964: Francis Takemoto becomes the first Asian American general officer in the United States Army.
- 1999: Eric Shinseki becomes the first Asian American four-star general and Chief of Staff of the United States Army.
- 2009: Eric Shinseki becomes the first Asian American United States Secretary of Veterans Affairs.
- 2015: Harry Harris Jr. becomes the first Asian American to command the U.S. Pacific Command (USPACOM).
- 2020: JoAnne S. Bass becomes the first Asian American to hold the senior enlisted position in the U.S. Air Force, as the 19th Chief Master Sergeant of the U.S. Air Force.

== Religion ==
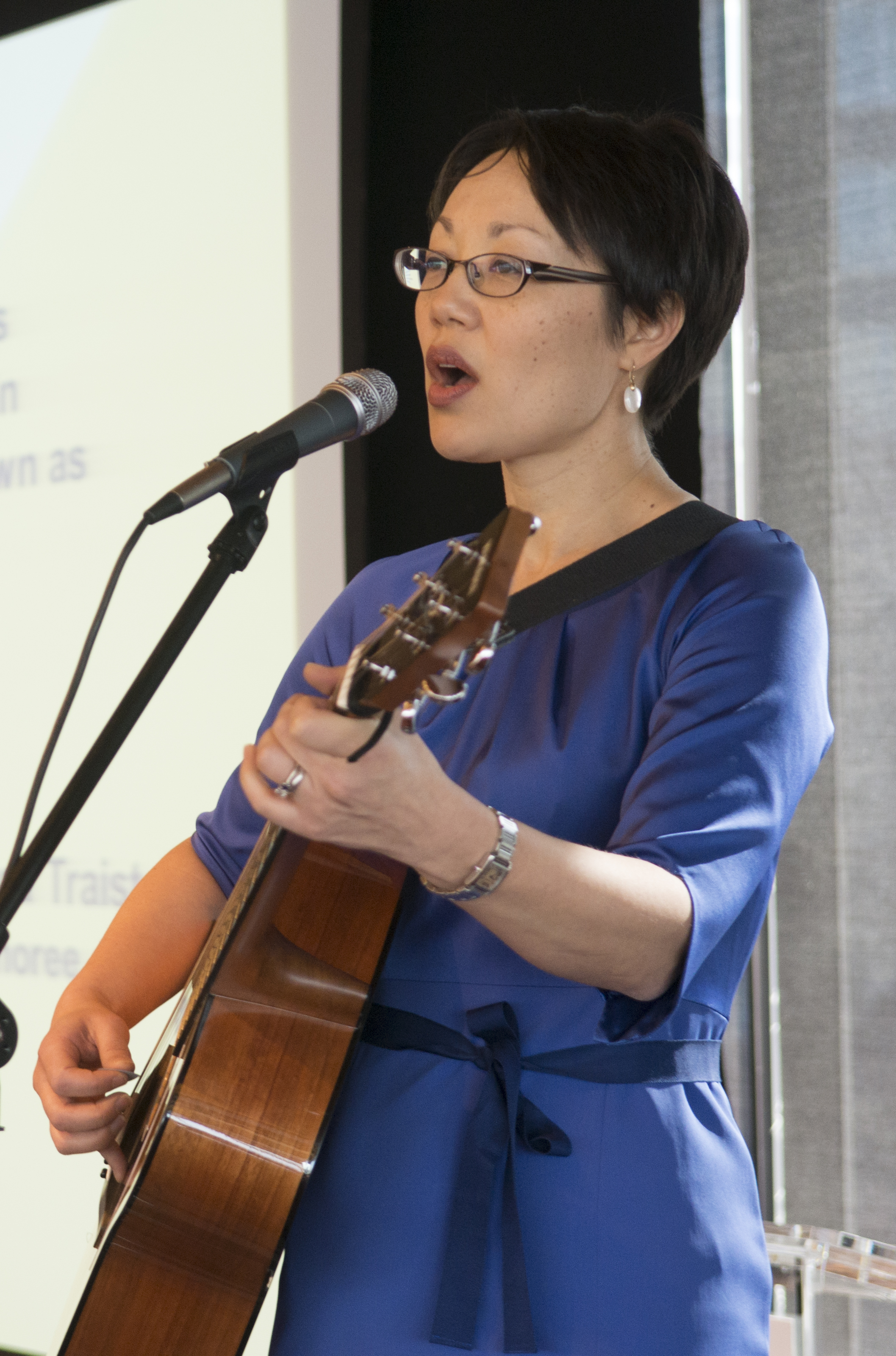
Rabbi Angela Warnick Buchdahl

- 1999: Angela Warnick Buchdahl becomes the first Asian American to be ordained as a cantor upon being ordained by HUC-JIR, an American seminary for Reform Judaism.
- 2001: Angela Warnick Buchdahl becomes the first Asian American to be ordained as a rabbi upon being ordained by HUC-JIR, an American seminary for Reform Judaism.
- 2002: Ignatius Wang becomes the first Asian American bishop of the Roman Catholic Church.

== Science and technology ==
=== Aerospace and aviation ===
- 1985: Ellison Onizuka becomes the first Asian American in space, as an astronaut on the space shuttle Discovery.

=== Mathematics ===
- 1982: Shing-Tung Yau becomes the first Asian American to be awarded the Fields Medal.

=== Physics ===
- 1975: Chien-Shiung Wu becomes the first woman (not just Asian American) president of the American Physical Society.
- 1978: Chien-Shiung Wu becomes the first person (not just Asian American) to win the Wolf Prize in Physics.

=== Nobel Prizes ===
- 1957: Chen-Ning Yang and Tsung-dao Lee won the Nobel Prize in Physics. They would later become US citizens in 1964 and 1962 respectively.
- 1976: Samuel C. C. Ting becomes the first U.S. born Asian American to win the Nobel Prize in Physics.

== Sports ==
=== Baseball ===
- 1956: Bobby Balcena becomes the first Asian American to play in Major League Baseball (MLB), playing two games for the Cincinnati Redlegs.
- 2008: Don Wakamatsu hired as the first Asian American MLB manager.
- 2020: Dave Roberts becomes the first Asian American baseball manager to win the World Series.
- 2020: Kim Ng is hired by the Miami Marlins as the first Asian American to serve as general manager of an MLB team.
- 2023: Corbin Carroll becomes the first Asian American to win a Major League Baseball Rookie of the Year Award.

=== Basketball ===
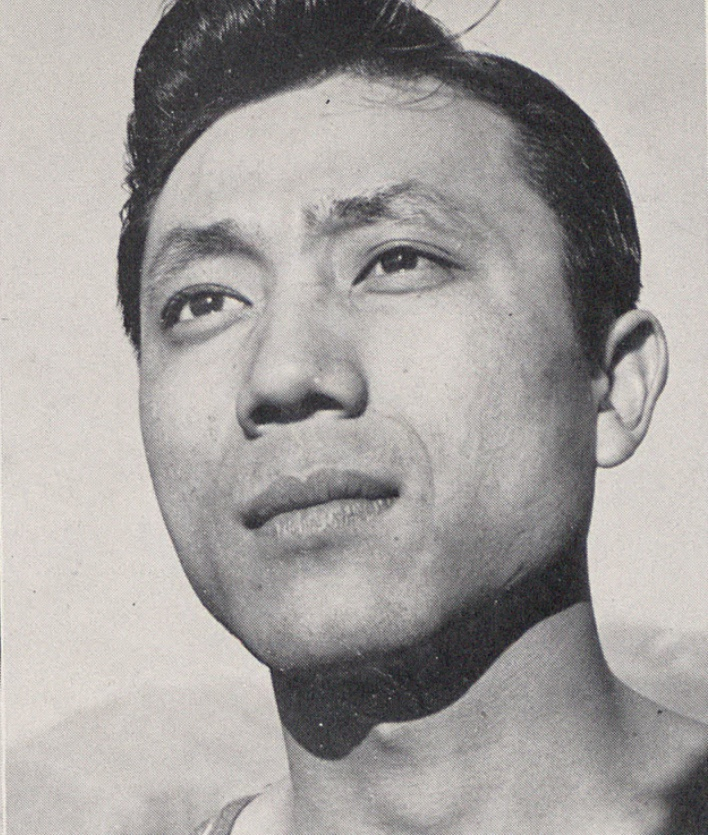
Asian American point guard Wataru Misaka broke basketball's color barrier as the first non-white player to play in the NBA in 1947.

- 1944: Wataru Misaka becomes the first Asian American NCAA Division I men's basketball tournament champion, alongside the Utah Utes.
- 1947: Wataru Misaka breaks the color barrier of the National Basketball Association (NBA), becoming the first Asian American to play in the league.
- 2008: Erik Spoelstra becomes the first Asian American head coach of the NBA (for the Miami Heat). He is the first Asian American head coach in any of the four major North American sports leagues.
- 2010: Rich Cho becomes the first Asian American general manager of an NBA team, the Portland Trail Blazers.
- 2019: Jeremy Lin becomes the first Asian American NBA Champion.
- 2020: Mike Magpayo is hired as men's head coach at UC Riverside, becoming the first Asian American to hold this position in NCAA Division I men's basketball.
- 2024: Natalie Nakase becomes the first Asian American head coach of a WNBA team, the newly-formed Golden State Valkyries.
- 2025: Eric Spoelstra becomes the first Asian American head coach of the United States men's national basketball team.

=== Figure skating ===
- 1985: Tiffany Chin becomes the first Asian American U.S. Figure Skating national champion.

=== Football (Gridiron football) ===
- 1927: Walter Achiu becomes the first Asian American to play in the National Football League (NFL) when he plays for the now defunct Dayton Triangles.
- 1962: Roman Gabriel becomes the first Asian American NFL quarterback.
- 2020: Younghoe Koo becomes the first Asian American to lead the NFL in scoring in a season. He also led the league in field goals made.
- 2020: Koo becomes the first Asian American named to the NFL Pro Bowl.
- 2025: Marcus Freeman, head coach of the Notre Dame Fighting Irish, becomes the first Asian American and first Black coach to reach the College Football Playoff National Championship.

=== Golf ===
- 1994: Tiger Woods becomes the first Asian American to win the United States Amateur Championship. (Woods' mixed ancestry – 1/4 Chinese, 1/4 Thai, 1/4 African-American, 1/8 white, and 1/8 Native American – also made him the first African-American to achieve this feat. He was also the first of only five golfers of primarily non-European descent to win a men's major, with the others being Vijay Singh (an Indian Fijian), Michael Campbell (a Māori from New Zealand), Y.E. Yang (South Korean), and Collin Morikawa (Japanese American).)

=== Hockey ===
- 1947: Larry Kwong is the first Asian descent and non-white player in the National Hockey League (NHL) and played for the New York Rangers.

=== Martial arts ===
- 2000: B.J. Penn becomes the first American (not just Asian American) to win the World Jiu Jitsu Championship.
- 2004: B.J. Penn becomes the first Asian American UFC champion, winning in the Welterweight Championship.
- 2008: B.J. Penn becomes the first Asian American Lightweight Champion in the UFC.
- 2025: Joshua Van becomes the first Asian American Flyweight Champion in the UFC.

=== Olympics ===
- 1948: Victoria Manalo Draves wins gold in platform and springboard diving in the 1948 Olympics, becoming the first Asian American to win a gold medal in the Summer Olympics.
- 1952: Sammy Lee wins gold in platform diving, becoming the first Asian American man to do so.

=== Tennis ===
- 1989: Michael Chang becomes the first Asian American winner of a Grand Slam tennis tournament in men's singles, winning the French Open. To this day, he remains the only male player of Asian descent, regardless of nationality, to win a men's singles Grand Slam event.

== See also ==
- List of Asian Americans
- List of Asian American jurists
- List of Asian-American writers
- List of African American firsts
- List of Native American firsts
