= List of managers of Asian heritage in sports leagues in the United States and Canada =

The following is a list of general managers, head coaches, and assistant coaches of Asian heritage in sports leagues in the United States and Canada, including the Big Four, other professional leagues and the collegiate NCAA. Some of the appointments listed below made into the list of Asian-American firsts.

Existing Asian coaches reflect that problems of race and sports especially "Asian stereotypes exist at all levels of basketball", which contributes to a factor why there has been a lack of Asian coaches in NCAA basketball. The Asian Coaches Association is the most prominent association representing the causes of Asian basketball coaches.

Women of Asian heritage coaching men's teams in particular encounter stereotypes. In 1998, Kim Ng recalled "she has been treated with kid gloves since being named an assistant GM with the Yankees."

== List ==
† denotes women coaching or overseeing a men's team.

Name	Title	League	Club	From	Until	Notes
Dave Yanai	Head coach	NAIA / NCAA D-II Basketball	Cal State Dominguez Hills Toros and Cal State Los Angeles Golden Eagles	1977	2005	
Erik Spoelstra	Assistant coach	NBA	Miami Heat	1997	April 2008	Filipino descent from mother's side
Kim Ng †	Asst. General Manager	MLB	New York Yankees	March 1998	2001	
Kim Ng †	Asst. General Manager	MLB	Los Angeles Dodgers	2002	March 2011	
Erik Spoelstra	Head coach	NBA	Miami Heat	April 2008	present *	First Filipino head coach
Don Wakamatsu	Field manager	MLB	Seattle Mariners	November 2008	August 2010	First field manager of Asian descent in Major League Baseball
Rich Cho	General manager	NBA	Portland Trail Blazers	July 2010	May 2011	First Asian G.M. in Big Four leagues
Rich Cho	General manager	NBA	Charlotte Hornets	June 2011	February 2018	
Norm Chow	Head coach	NCAA Division I Football Bowl Subdivision	Hawaii Rainbow Warriors	December 2011	November 2015	
Matt Okada	Associate Head Coach	NCAA D-II Basketball	Dominican Penguins	August 2021	present *	
Asami Morita	Head Coach	NCAA D-II Basketball	Westminster Griffins	May 2023	present *	First full Japanese head coach of an NCAA or four-year program
Jonathan Yim	Player Development Coach	NBA	Portland Trail Blazers	2013	2021	
Shenton Wai	Asst. coach	NCAA D-I Basketball	UTSA Roadrunners	June 2015	March 2016	
Dave Roberts	Field manager	MLB	Los Angeles Dodgers	November 2015	present *	First field manager of Asian heritage to lead team to the World Series
Jeff Hironaka	Head coach	NCAA D-II Basketball	Seattle Pacific Falcons and Colorado Christian Cougars	2002	March 2020	
Bobby Webster	General manager	NBA	Toronto Raptors	June 2017	present *	Japanese descent from mother's side; only NBA G.M. presently* of Asian heritage
Natalie Nakase †	Asst. coach	NBA	Los Angeles Clippers	August 2018	June 2020	
Don Wakamatsu	Field manager (interim)	MLB	Texas Rangers	September 2018	October 2018	
Mike Magpayo	Head coach	NCAA D-I Basketball	UC Riverside Highlanders	July 2020	March 2025	First NCAA Division I head coach of Asian heritage
Rex Walters	Assistant Coach	NBA Basketball	New Orleans Pelicans	2020	2021	First NCAA Division I half-Japanese (half German) player for Northwestern University and University of Kansas Final Four Team (1992-1993) and a draft pick of New Jersey Nets in 1993 NBA Draft. Coached San Francisco Dons, assistant coach with Detroit Pistons.
Kim Ng †	General manager	MLB	Miami Marlins	November 2020	October 2023	First female G.M. (irrespective of ethnicity) in Big Four leagues
Marcus Freeman	Head Coach	NCAA Division I Football Bowl Subdivision	Notre Dame Fighting Irish	December 2021	present *	Korean descent from mother's side. First NCAA Division I Football Bowl Subdivision head coach of Korean heritage
Natalie Nakase	Asst. coach	WNBA	Las Vegas Aces	February 2022	October 2024	
Rex Walters	Assistant Coach	NBA Basketball	Charlotte Hornets	2022	2024	
Sean Desai	Defensive Coordinator	NFL	Philadelphia Eagles	February 2023	January 2024	First NFL coordinator of Indian descent. In 2010, he was also the youngest coordinator in Division I for Temple Owls football.
Natalie Nakase	Head Coach	WNBA	Golden State Valkyries	October 2024	present *	First WNBA head coach of Asian-American heritage
Mike Magpayo	Head coach	NCAA D-I Basketball	Fordham Rams	March 2025	present *	
Hao Meng	Asst. General Manager	NBA	San Antonio Spurs	September 2025	present *	
Kurt Suzuki	Field Manager	MLB	Los Angeles Angels	October 2025	present *	

* denotes present up to December 2021

== See also ==
- Asian Americans in sports
- List of Asian-American firsts
- Race and sports

Terminology

- General manager (NBA)
- General manager (MLB)
- Field manager (MLB)
