= Dave Roberts (baseball manager) =

American baseball player and manager (born 1972)

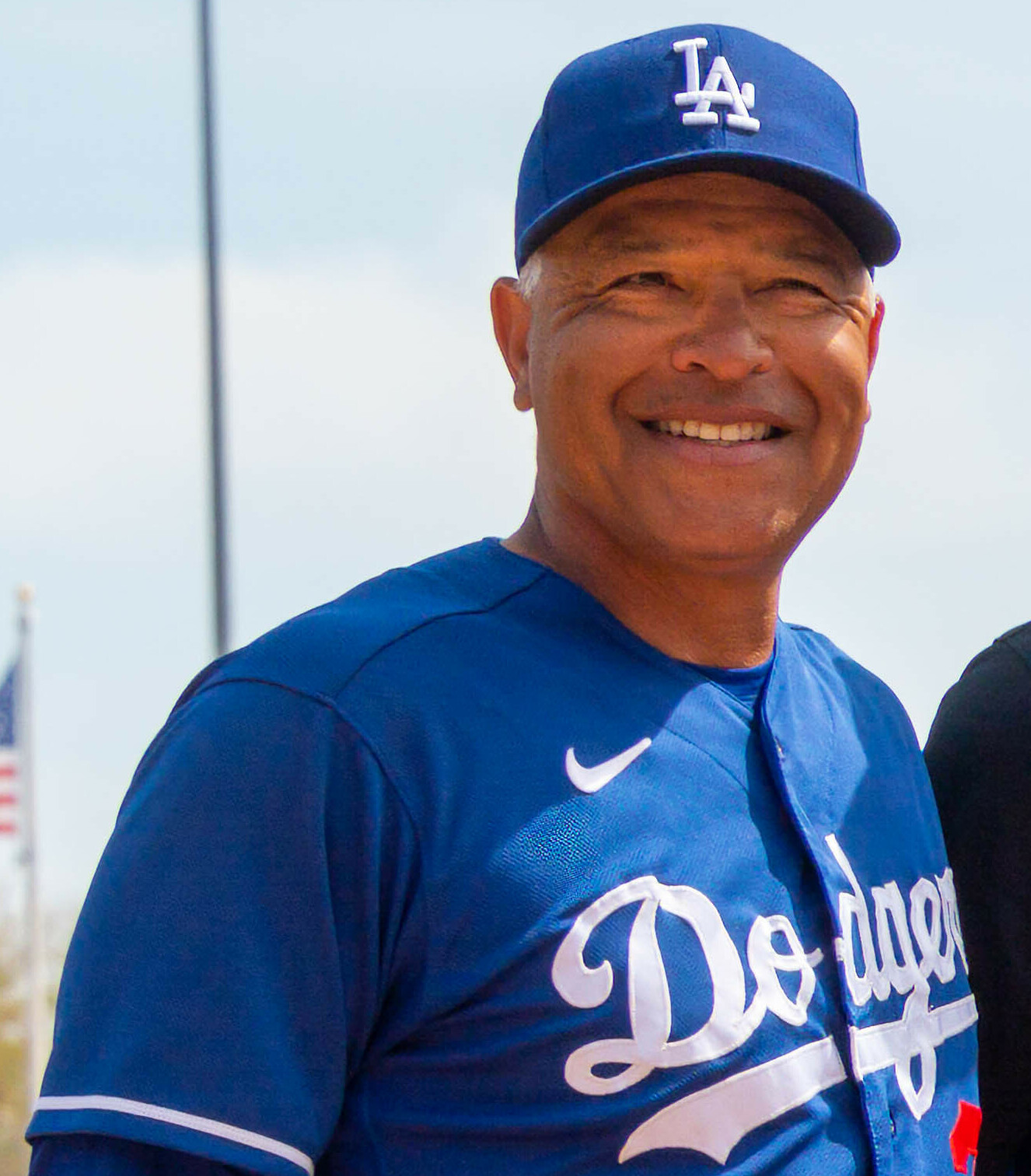
- Roberts with the Los Angeles Dodgers in 2023

Los Angeles Dodgers – No. 30
- Outfielder / Manager
- Born: May 31, 1972 (age 54); Naha, Okinawa, Japan
- Batted: Left Threw: Left

MLB debut
- August 7, 1999, for the Cleveland Indians

Last MLB appearance
- September 27, 2008, for the San Francisco Giants

MLB statistics (through 2026 season)
- Batting average: .266
- Home runs: 23
- Runs batted in: 213
- Stolen bases: 243
- Managerial record: 1,044–638
- Winning %: .621
- Stats at Baseball Reference
- Managerial record at Baseball Reference

Teams
- As player: Cleveland Indians (1999–2001); Los Angeles Dodgers (2002–2004); Boston Red Sox (2004); San Diego Padres (2005–2006); San Francisco Giants (2007–2008); As manager: San Diego Padres (2015) (Note: Roberts managed a single game with the Padres after manager Bud Black was fired. Pat Murphy was named as the new manager the next day and Roberts returned to his bench coach role for the rest of the season.); Los Angeles Dodgers (2016–present); As coach: San Diego Padres (2011–2015)

Career highlights and awards
- 4× World Series champion (2004, 2020, 2024, 2025); NL Manager of the Year (2016)
Medals
Men's baseball
Representing United States
Pan American Games
Silver medal – second place	1999 Winnipeg	Team competition

David Ray Roberts (Japanese: 池原 礼, Ikehara Rei, born May 31, 1972), nicknamed "Doc", is an American professional baseball manager and former outfielder who is the manager of the Los Angeles Dodgers of Major League Baseball (MLB). He played for five MLB teams over a ten-year career and then coached for the San Diego Padres before being named Dodgers manager in 2016. Although he played for the Boston Red Sox for only part of one season, his most notable achievement as a player was a key stolen base in the 2004 American League Championship Series that extended the Red Sox's postseason, which culminated in a championship in the 2004 World Series.

The son of an African American father and Japanese mother, Roberts became the first manager of Asian heritage to lead a team to the World Series in 2017, when the Dodgers captured the National League pennant. After another appearance in 2018, Roberts broke through with World Series victories in 2020, 2024, and 2025. Roberts is the first manager of Asian heritage and second Black manager to lead a team to a World Series title following Cito Gaston and preceding Dusty Baker.

== Early life ==
David Ray Roberts was born on May 31, 1972, in Naha, Okinawa in Japan, to Waymon, an African American United States Marine stationed in Japan and Eiko, a Japanese woman native to Okinawa. He has a younger sister, Melissa. His childhood was spent moving from one military base to another in two- and three-year sequences, first in Okinawa and then in multiple bases in California, to Okinawa again, to North Carolina, to Hawaii, and finally back to California eventually settling in San Diego.

Roberts attended Vista High School in Vista, California as a freshman and was the most valuable player of the junior varsity baseball team. He transferred to Rancho Buena Vista High School when it opened the following year, where he was a standout in football, basketball and baseball. In football, he was a three-year starter at quarterback; as a senior, he helped lead his team to the San Diego Section Class 3A championship. Roberts was recruited to play football for the Air Force Academy as an option quarterback, but declined because he wanted to play baseball.

== College career ==
Roberts decided to attend the University of California, Los Angeles (UCLA) and joined their Bruins baseball team as a walk-on outfielder after impressing coaches with his speed and enthusiasm. He hit .331 as a sophomore with 36 stolen bases and as a junior he hit .296 with 28 stolen bases.

The Cleveland Indians selected Roberts in the 47th round of the 1993 MLB draft. He was disappointed with being drafted so low, behind seven other UCLA juniors, and his coach told him he needed to improve his defense and that his weak throwing arm was hurting his draft stock. He improved by getting to the ball quicker and was able to lead the Bruins in outfield assists as a senior, while also hitting .353 with 45 steals. He left UCLA as the school's all-time stolen-base leader and graduated with a Bachelor of Arts degree in history in 1995.

== Professional career ==
=== Draft and minor leagues ===
The Detroit Tigers selected Roberts in the 28th round of the 1994 MLB draft and signed him on June 9, 1994. He began his career with the Jamestown Jammers, the Tigers' short-season class A team in the New York–Pennsylvania League. Roberts hit .292 with 12 steals for the Jammers, who won the division title with a 42–32 record. For the 1995 season, he was promoted to play for the Lakeland Tigers in the Florida State League, where he hit .303 in 92 games with 30 stolen bases, fourth best in the league.

In 1996, Roberts was assigned to the Visalia Oaks of the California League. The Oaks were a co-op team made up of players from several organizations. He was frustrated with the assignment and thought about quitting baseball but his father talked him out of it. In 126 games, he hit .272 with 65 stolen bases, which led all of minor league baseball and he scored 112 runs, tops in the Cal League. He appeared in three games for the AA Jacksonville Suns of the Southern League at the end of the season and had two hits in nine at-bats. He also hit a three-run home run in the 15th inning to help the Suns win Game 1 of their playoff series. He remained at Jacksonville the next season, playing in 105 games for them, with a .296 average and 23 steals. In 1998, Roberts once again began the season with the Suns. He played in 69 games and hit .326 with 21 stolen bases and was named to the Southern League mid-season all-star team.

=== Cleveland Indians (1999–2001) ===
In June 1998, Roberts and Tim Worrell were traded to the Cleveland Indians for Gerónimo Berroa. Roberts was traded just before the Southern League All-Star Game and played in the game wearing an Indians hat even though the Indians did not have a Southern League team at the time. He was assigned to the Akron Aeros of the Eastern League, where he batted .361 in 56 games with 28 steals. He was promoted to the Buffalo Bisons, the Indians' Triple-A team in the International League, late in the season. He had only two hits in 15 at-bats for the Bisons but remained with the team in the playoffs, as the Bisons won their first Governors' Cup in nearly 40 years and made it to the Triple-A World Series. Roberts later said his promotion to Buffalo was exciting because he realized he was getting close to the big leagues and his time there made him a better player.

Roberts played with the Cañeros de Los Mochis of the Mexican Pacific League during the 1998–99 season before playing for the Criollos de Caguas in Puerto Rico, where he played with Alex Cora, and had Joey Cora as general manager. Almost 20 years later Roberts, as manager of the Dodgers, would go on to meet Alex Cora as manager of the Red Sox in the 2018 MLB World Series.

Roberts was a non-roster invitee at Indians spring training in 1999 but was assigned to Buffalo to start the season. In 89 games for the Bisons, he had a .271 batting average with 39 steals. He earned International League all-star honors for the season. His contract was purchased by the Indians on August 7, 1999 and he made his major league debut batting leadoff and playing center field for the Indians against the Tampa Bay Devil Rays. In his debut he had three hits in five at-bats and stole a base: he was also picked off once. His first MLB hit was a double to center field in his second at-bat, off of Bobby Witt of the Devil Rays in the second inning. He hit his first home run on August 30 off of Ramón Ortiz of the Anaheim Angels. On September 24, he hit a grand slam homer off of John Hudek of the Toronto Blue Jays. Overall, he was in 41 games for the Indians in 1999 and hit .238 with two homers, 12 RBI and 11 stolen bases. He also appeared in two games of the 1999 American League Division Series (ALDS), going hitless in three at-bats.

Roberts spent most of 2000 back in the minors with Buffalo, where he had a .292 average in 120 games with a career high 13 homers, 55 RBI and 39 steals. He also was second in the league with 93 runs scored. He was called up to the Indians briefly from May 26–29 and then was called up when rosters expanded in September. In 19 games for the Indians, he had only two hits in 10 at-bats while being used primarily as a late-game defensive replacement. After the season, he had surgery on his left shoulder to repair a torn labrum and fraying around his rotator cuff, which caused him to begin the following season on the 60-day disabled list. When he returned on June 24, he was optioned back to the Bisons, where he hit .303 in 62 games. His 97 career steals in parts of four seasons in Buffalo ranks as the tops in franchise history and he would eventually be selected to the Buffalo Baseball Hall of Fame. He was again recalled to the majors in September and had four hits in 12 at-bats in 15 games for the Indians. In parts of three seasons with Cleveland, he hit .242 in 75 games.

=== Los Angeles Dodgers (2002–2004) ===
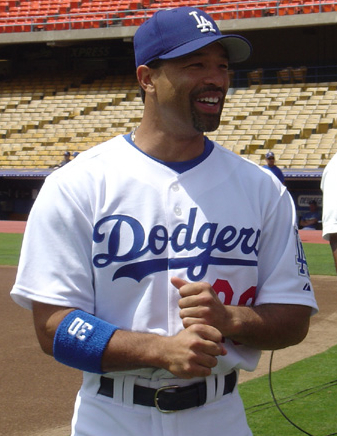
Roberts playing for the Los Angeles Dodgers

On December 22, 2001, Roberts was traded to the Los Angeles Dodgers for minor league pitchers Christian Bridenbaugh and Nial Hughes. The 2002 season with the Dodgers was Roberts's first full season on a major league roster. He was the leadoff hitter and starter as a center fielder. He finished the season with a .277 batting average in 127 games with 45 stolen bases. He missed the final seven games of the regular season with a partially torn oblique.

In 2003, Roberts appeared in only 107 games due to hamstring problems but managed to steal 42 bases while hitting .250. He was the 10th Dodgers player in history with consecutive 40-steal seasons. He committed his first career error on April 22 against the Cincinnati Reds, snapping a streak of 205 errorless games. He began the 2004 campaign with the Dodgers and hit .253 in 68 games with 33 steals despite missing most of May because of a recurrence of hamstring issues.

=== Boston Red Sox (2004) ===
On July 31, 2004, the Dodgers traded Roberts to the Boston Red Sox for minor league outfielder Henri Stanley. Roberts played in 45 games for the Red Sox and hit .256.

Roberts made a large contribution to the 2004 Red Sox post-season even though he did not play in the 2004 World Series. Most notable was his stolen base against the Yankees in the 2004 American League Championship Series Game 4. The Red Sox were facing elimination in the bottom of the ninth inning, down four runs to three. Kevin Millar drew a walk from Yankees closer Mariano Rivera. Roberts, who had not played in ten days, came in to pinch run with Bill Mueller hitting. Rivera attempted to pick off Roberts three times. On the first pitch to Mueller, Roberts stole second base, barely beating Yankees catcher Jorge Posada's throw and shortstop Derek Jeter's tag. After the steal, Mueller singled, Roberts scored from second, and the Sox went on to win the game in 12 innings, beginning their run of eight straight wins that culminated in Boston's first World Series title since 1918. In 2006, the Boston Red Sox Hall of Fame recognized the steal as a Memorable Moment in Red Sox history.

=== San Diego Padres (2005–2006) ===
The Red Sox traded Roberts to the San Diego Padres on December 20, 2004, in exchange for outfielder Jay Payton, infielder Ramón Vázquez, minor league pitcher David Pauley, and cash.

Roberts played center field for the Padres in 2005, hitting .275 in 115 games and moving to left field when Gold Glove winner Mike Cameron from the New York Mets was acquired before the 2006 season. That season Roberts established career highs with a .293 batting average, 49 steals, and 13 triples. The latter statistic tied Tony Gwynn's 19-year single-season franchise record. In the 2006 National League Division Series, Roberts hit .438 to lead the Padres, even though they were eliminated from the playoffs by the St. Louis Cardinals.

=== San Francisco Giants (2007–2008) ===
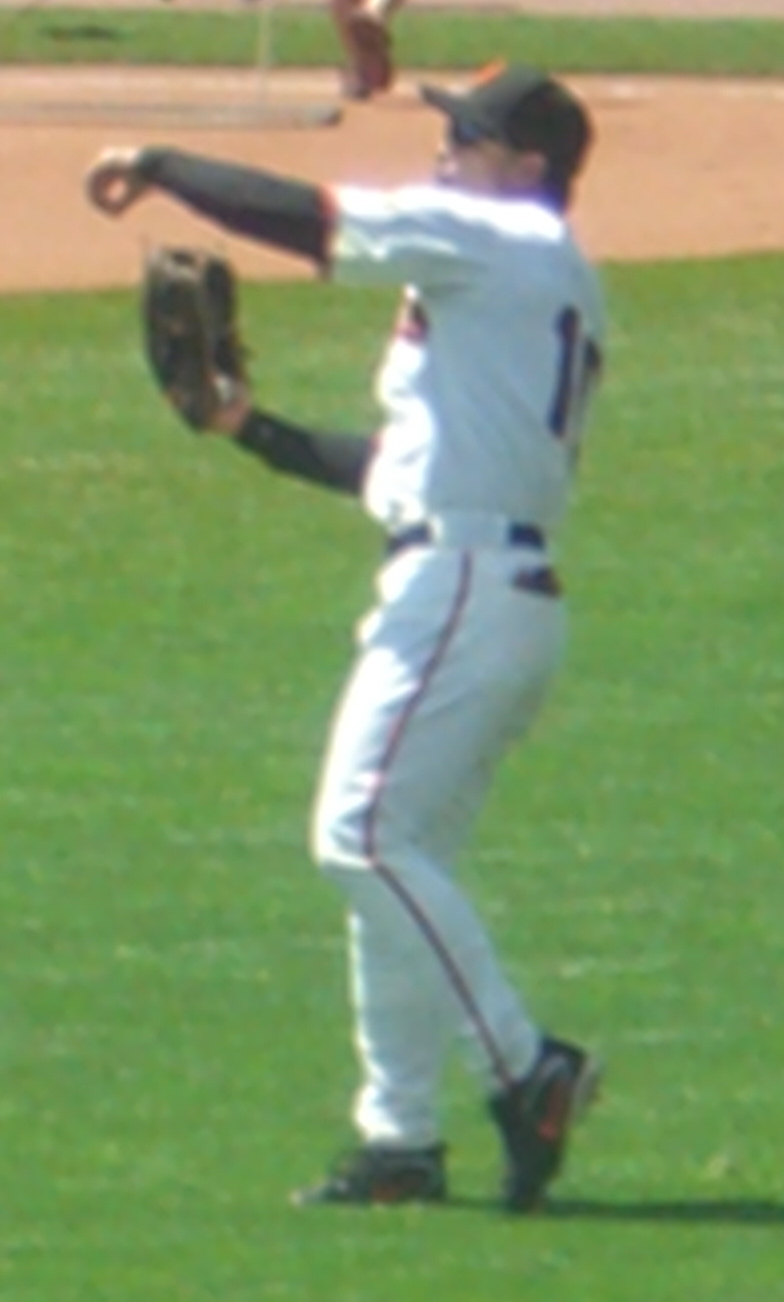
Roberts playing for the San Francisco Giants

In December 2006, Roberts signed with the San Francisco Giants. The Giants, trying to acquire a center fielder, first tried to sign Gary Matthews, Jr. and Juan Pierre, but both players passed on the Giants in favor of other teams. Roberts agreed to a 3-year, $18-million deal with the team in early December 2006. The Giants backloaded the deal agreeing to pay Roberts $5 million in 2007 and $6.5 million in 2008 and 2009.

Roberts's career with the Giants got off to a slow start because of injury. He spent most of May and early June on the disabled list. Roberts was batting only .216 before he went on the disabled list, but his swing had been hampered by the bone chips and spurs in his elbow that required surgery. He finished the season hitting .260 in 114 games with 31 stolen bases. Continually bothered by injuries, he only played in 52 games in 2008, hitting a career low .224 with only five steals.

On March 5, 2009, the Giants released Roberts even though they owed him money for the last year of his contract.

=== Player profile ===
Roberts had above-average knowledge of the strike zone and used it to his advantage. He had little power, but was a spray hitter who used raw speed to get on base and stretch singles to doubles. Once on base, he commonly "manufactured" runs with such tactics as stealing second base, moving to third on a grounder, and coming home on a sacrifice fly. When healthy, Roberts was widely known as one of the best base stealers in baseball. From 2002 to 2006, he had 195 steals, as well as an 81 percent success rate, both of which were the second-best in the majors among base stealers with 175 steals just behind stolen base king Rickey Henderson in the career stolen base rate rankings. In fact, Roberts' career stolen base success rate is 21st all-time among players with at least 300 career attempts. He had exceptional range in the outfield, but his below-average arm occasionally allowed his opponents to take extra bases on him.

== Broadcasting career ==
In May 2009, Roberts retired from baseball and joined NESN as a studio analyst and occasional color commentator for Red Sox telecasts. After one season as a broadcaster, he left the network to join the Padres as a Baseball Operations Special Assistant, where he would work with players in the organization on outfield defense, baserunning, and bunting.

== Coaching and managerial career ==
=== San Diego Padres (2011–2015) ===
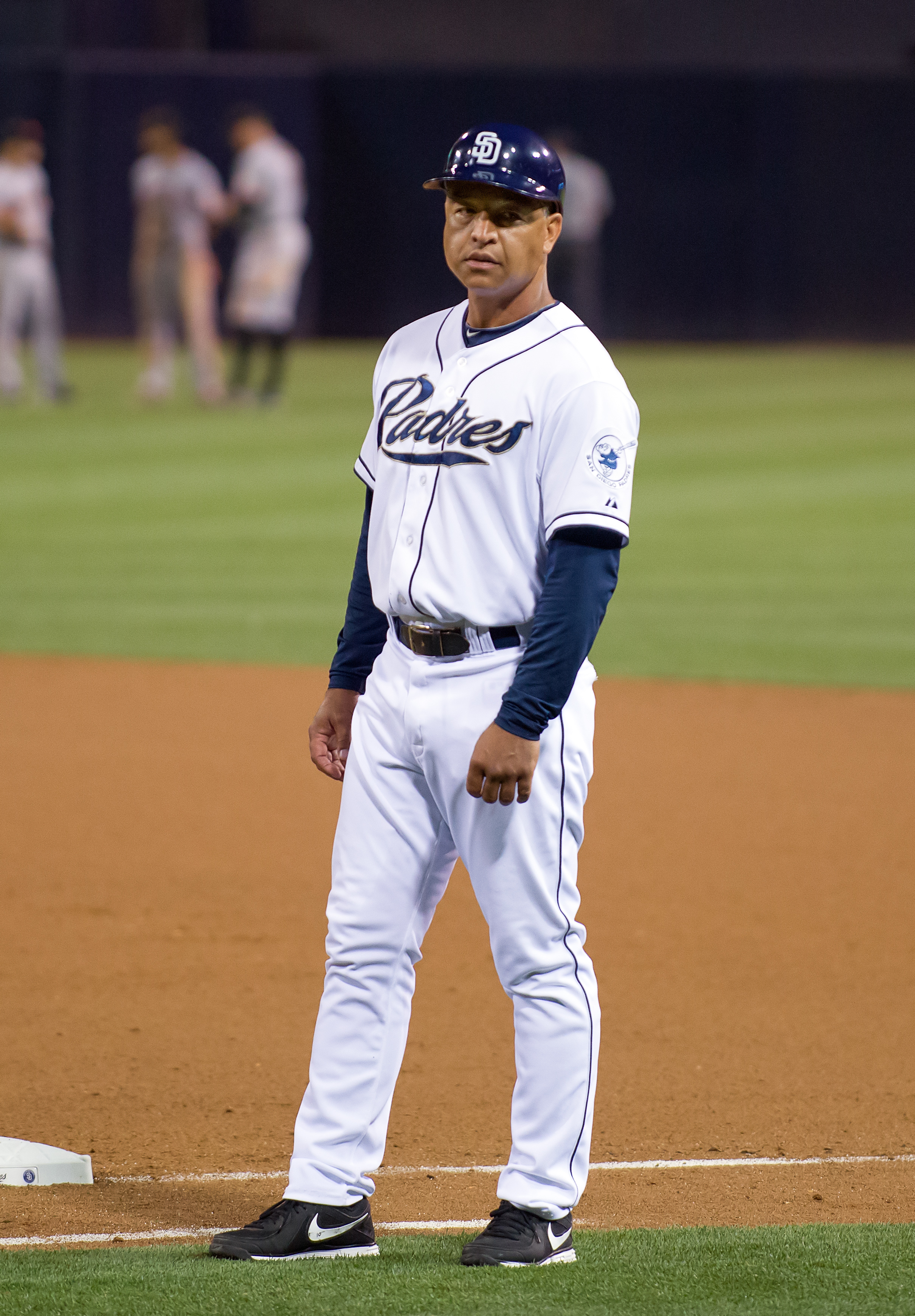
Roberts as Padres coach

On October 18, 2010, Roberts was hired by the San Diego Padres as the first base coach, replacing Rick Renteria, when he was promoted to bench coach. When Rentería was named manager of the Chicago Cubs after the 2013 season, Roberts once again succeeded him, named as manager Bud Black's bench coach for the 2014 campaign.

On June 15, 2015, Roberts filled in as the Padres' manager for one game when Black was fired after starting 2015 at 32–33 and six games behind in the National League West. The Padres lost that game 9–1 to the Oakland Athletics. Pat Murphy was named as the new manager the next day and Roberts returned to his bench coach role for the rest of the season.

=== Los Angeles Dodgers (2016–present) ===
Roberts was named manager of the Los Angeles Dodgers on November 23, 2015. He became the first minority manager in the franchise's history. In 2016, the Dodgers set the MLB record in Roberts's first year by placing 28 players on the disabled list throughout the season, as well as the record for the most pitching changes (606) in a single season. Despite the injuries, the Dodgers won their fourth consecutive NL West title and advanced to the 2016 NLCS, losing to the eventual champions Chicago Cubs in 6 games. Roberts received praise during the postseason for how he used Kenley Jansen in non-traditional closer situations. He was selected as the Sporting News National League Manager of the Year and was voted by the Baseball Writers' Association of America as the National League Manager of the Year.

In 2017, Roberts led the Dodgers back to the playoffs, where they swept the Arizona Diamondbacks in the 2017 NLDS and then defeated the Chicago Cubs in five games in the 2017 NLCS. Roberts became first manager of Asian heritage ever in the World Series, as well as the fourth African-American manager. The Dodgers faced the Houston Astros in the 2017 World Series, where they were defeated in seven games. It was later determined that the Astros illegally stole signs during the 2017 regular season and postseason.

In 2018, the Dodgers got off to a rocky start at the beginning of the season with a 16–26 record, but rebounded to win the NL West, finishing 92–71. Roberts led the Dodgers to the 2018 World Series after the Dodgers defeated the Atlanta Braves three games to one in the 2018 NLDS and then defeated the Milwaukee Brewers in seven games in the NLCS. The Dodgers faced one of Roberts's former teams, the Boston Red Sox, and former Dodgers teammate Alex Cora for the championship. Boston won the series in five games, giving the Red Sox their ninth World Series title and the Dodgers a second consecutive World Series loss.

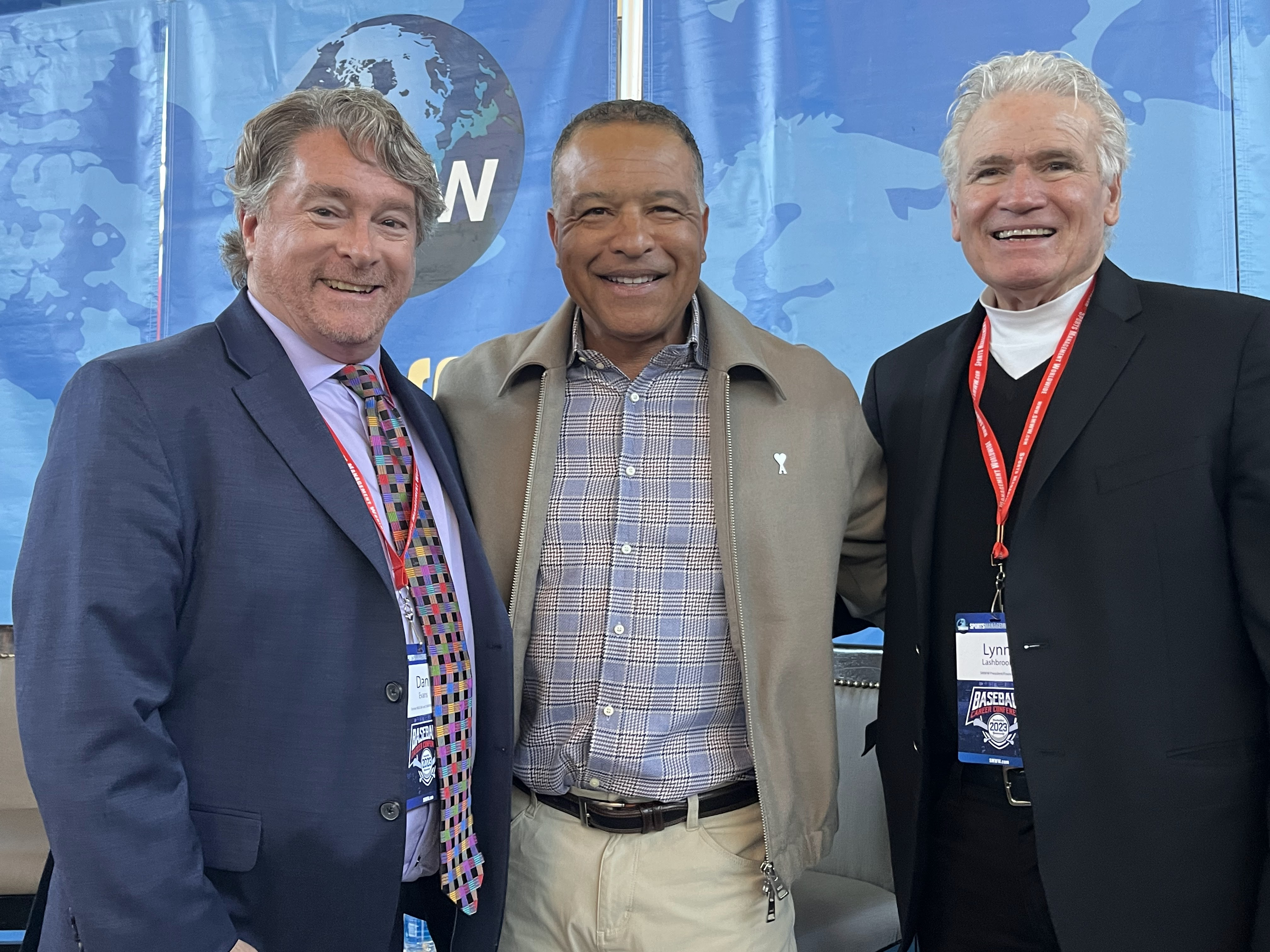
Dan Evans (left), Dave Roberts and Dr. Lynn Lashbrook at the 2023 Winter Meetings Baseball Career Conference

On December 3, 2018, Roberts and the Dodgers agreed to a four-year contract extension, through the 2022 season.

In 2019, Roberts led the team to an 106–56 record, the second highest mark in the league that season and a franchise record. However, they were upset by the Washington Nationals in the NLDS in 5 games, who went on to win it all.

During the COVID-19 pandemic, on May 1, 2020, Roberts appeared at Dodger Stadium during a "Quarantunes" remote fund-raising concert, and was joined for a Q&A by Bob Costas in his home studio.

In 2020, Roberts led the Dodgers to the playoffs once more. They swept the Milwaukee Brewers in the 2020 National League Wild Card Series and the San Diego Padres in the 2020 NLDS, both of which had modified schedules due to the COVID-19 pandemic. After coming back from a 3–1 deficit against the Atlanta Braves in the 2020 NLCS, the Dodgers defeated the Tampa Bay Rays in six games in the 2020 World Series. Roberts became the first African-American manager of a World Series-winning team since Cito Gaston and the first manager of Asian heritage to win the World Series.

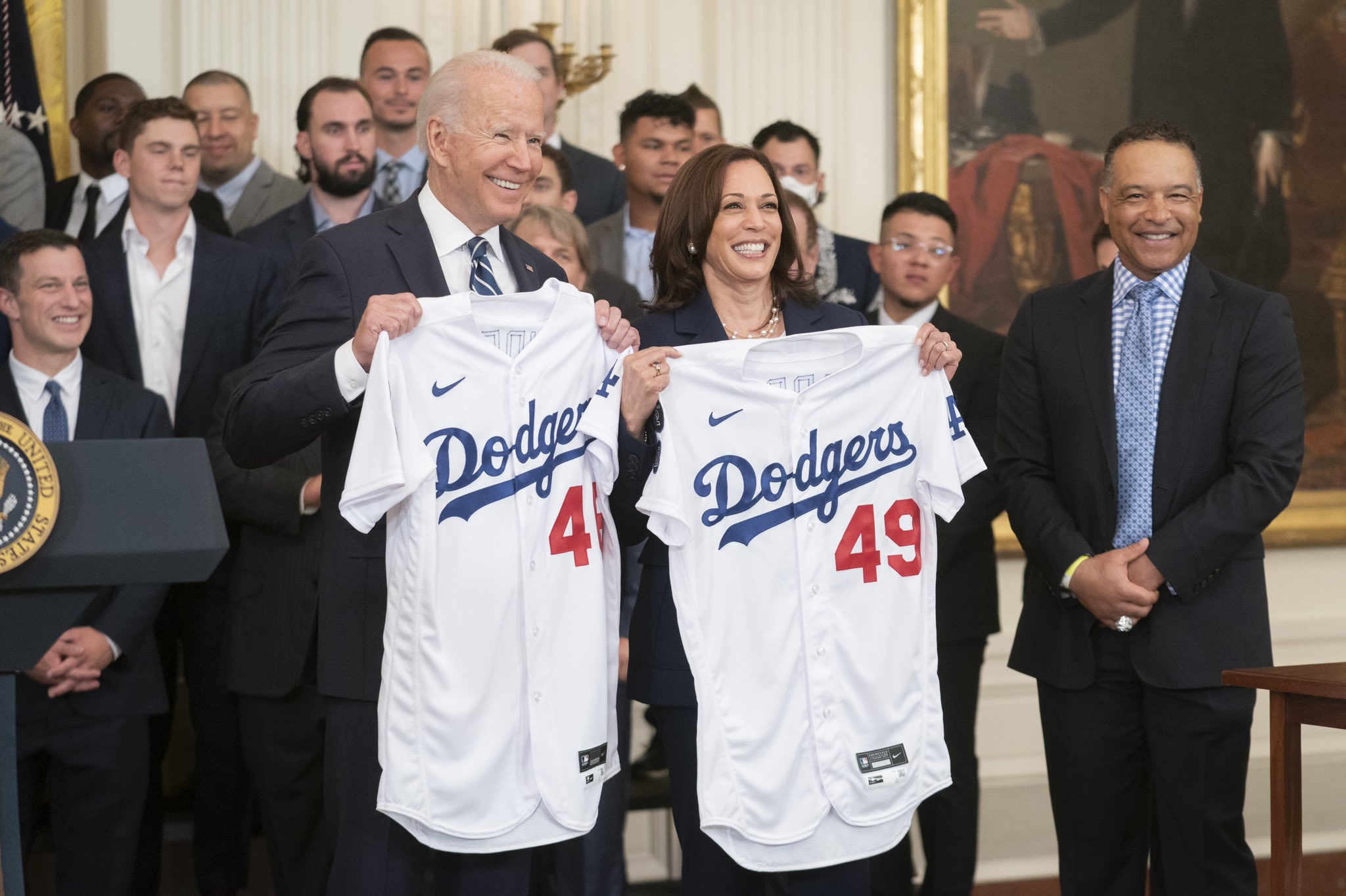
Roberts (far right) with Joe Biden, Kamala Harris and the Dodgers at the White House in 2021

On March 25, 2022, Roberts signed a three-year contract extension with the Dodgers through the 2025 season. The Dodgers won 111 games in 2022, a mark only reached by four other teams in MLB history. It was the fourth time Roberts had a 100 win season, after doing it in 2017, 2019, and 2021. However, they lost in the 2022 National League Division Series to the San Diego Padres. This meant that the 2022 Dodgers had the most wins of a team to fail to win a postseason series in the division era. In the past four full seasons, the Dodgers won 100 games each time but only reached the NLCS once. They repeated as NL West champions with 100 wins in 2023 but lost yet again in the NLDS, this time to the 84-win Arizona Diamondbacks in a straight three-game sweep where Arizona never trailed at any point in the series. It was the third season in a row that the Dodgers had lost a playoff series to a team that had at least 15 more losses than the Dodgers.

In 2024, Roberts led the Dodgers to the National League pennant for the fourth time in his tenure as manager. In the World Series, the Dodgers defeated the American League champion New York Yankees in five games, securing his second and the franchise's eighth World Series title.

In 2025, the Dodgers beat the Toronto Blue Jays in Game 7 in Toronto, 5-4, in extra innings, securing another World Series win for Roberts.

On March 10, 2025, Roberts agreed to a new four-year contract extension with the Dodgers for $8 million per year, a new record for average annual value for a Major League manager.

Roberts recorded his 1,000th game victory on June 30, 2026, against the Athletics, joining the only other two active MLB managers to reach the threshold. He was the 69th baseball manager, and the fastest among them, to reach the milestone, achieving it after 1,606 games, passing Cap Anson's previous record. Roberts is fourth manager in the Dodgers franchise history to log 1,000 wins.

=== Managerial record ===
As of October 15,2026

Team	Year	Regular season					Postseason			
Team	Year	Games	Won	Lost	Win %	Finish	Won	Lost	Win %	Result
SD	2015	1	0	1	.000	Interim manager	–	–	–	
SD total		1	0	1	.000		–	–	–	
LAD	2016	162	91	71	.562	1st in NL West	5	6	.455	Lost NLCS (CHC)
LAD	2017	162	104	58	.642	1st in NL West	10	5	.667	Lost World Series (HOU)
LAD	2018	163	92	71	.564	1st in NL West	8	8	.500	Lost World Series (BOS)
LAD	2019	162	106	56	.654	1st in NL West	2	3	.400	Lost NLDS (WAS)
LAD	2020	60	43	17	.717	1st in NL West	13	5	.722	Won World Series (TB)
LAD	2021	162	106	56	.654	2nd in NL West	6	6	.500	Lost NLCS (ATL)
LAD	2022	162	111	51	.685	1st in NL West	1	3	.250	Lost NLDS (SD)
LAD	2023	162	100	62	.617	1st in NL West	0	3	.000	Lost NLDS (ARI)
LAD	2024	162	98	64	.605	1st in NL West	11	5	.688	Won World Series (NYY)
LAD	2025	162	93	69	.574	1st in NL West	13	4	.765	Won World Series (TOR)
LAD	2026	162	100	62	.617	1st in NL West	3	5	.375	Lost NLCS ( MIL)
LAD total		1,681	1,044	637	.621		72	53	.576	
Total		1,682	1,044	638	.621		72	53	.576	

6948.590

== Personal life ==
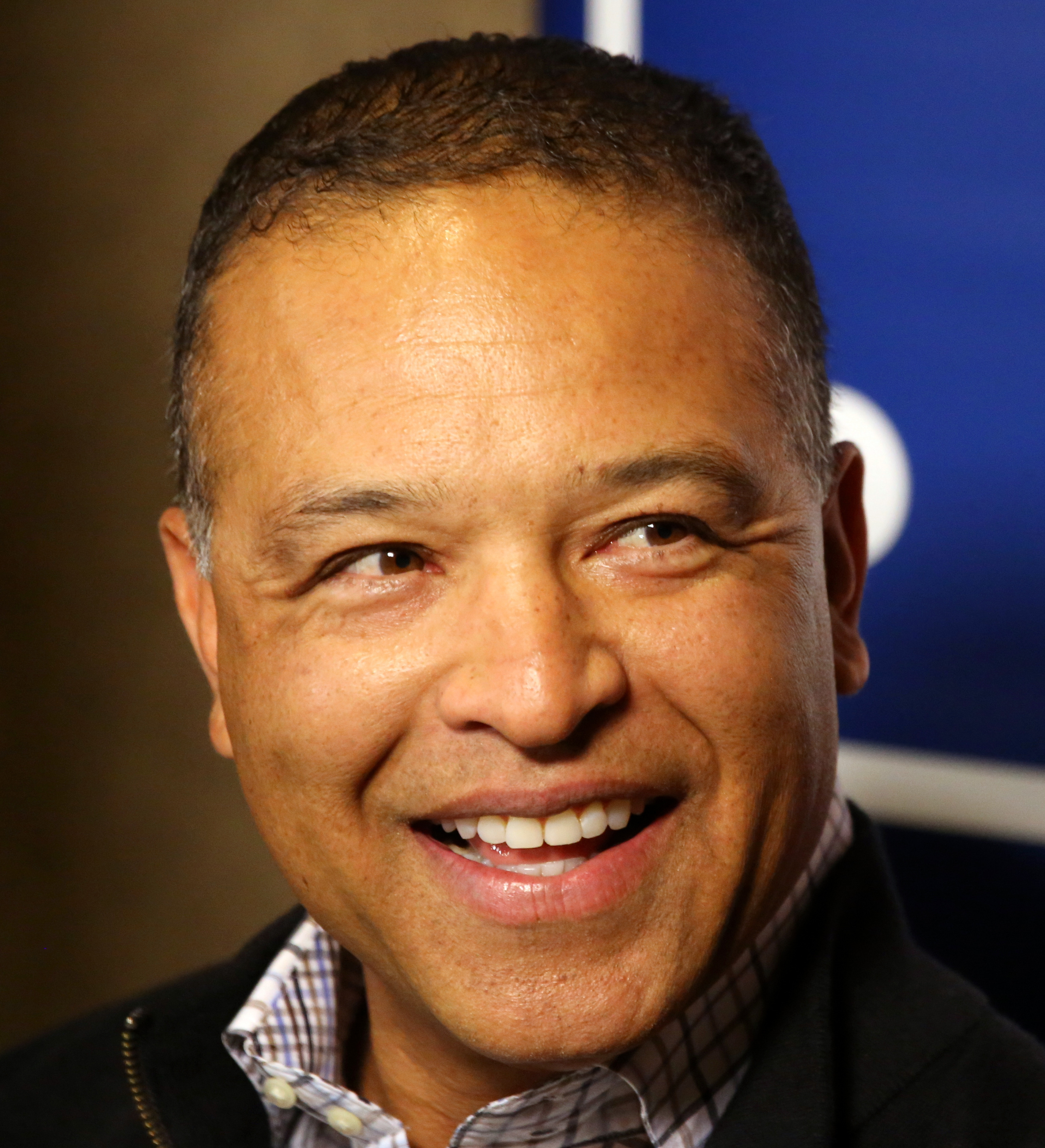
Roberts at the Winter Meetings in 2015

Roberts married his high school girlfriend, Tricia, in 1997. They have two children, son Cole and daughter Emme. Cole played college baseball for Loyola Marymount University. He last played for the Clearwater Threshers before being released in July of 2025. Roberts, along with former teammate Rich Aurilia and friends John and Noelle Micek, have been partners in Red Stitch Winery, based in Cardiff, California, since 2008.

In March 2010, Roberts was diagnosed with Hodgkin's lymphoma. After receiving treatments for lymphoma, Roberts reported he received a clean bill of health in June 2011.

Roberts is a Christian.

== See also ==
- List of Asian-American firsts
- List of Major League Baseball All-Star Game managers
- List of Major League Baseball managerial wins and winning percentage leaders
- List of managers of Asian heritage in sports leagues in the United States and Canada
- List of Pan American Games medalists in baseball
- List of San Diego Padres team records
- Los Angeles Dodgers award winners and league leaders

== Notes ==
Preceded by Rick Renteria	San Diego Padres first base coach 2011–2013	Succeeded by José Valentín
Preceded by Rick Renteria	San Diego Padres bench coach 2014–2015	Succeeded by Mark McGwire
