= List of Major League Baseball All-Star Game managers =

The following is a list of individuals who have managed the Major League Baseball All-Star Game over the years, since its inauguration in 1933. Chosen managers and winning pennant managers manage teams including American and National Leagues.

No official MLB All-Star Game was held in 1945 and 2020. MLB played two All-Star Games from 1959 through 1962.

== MLB All-Star Game managers ==
Key
†	Elected to the Baseball Hall of Fame

Date	Winning League (All-Time Record)	Score	Venue	AL Manager	Team	NL Manager	Team
July 6, 1933	American (1–0–0 AL)	4–2	Comiskey Park	Connie Mack^{†}	Philadelphia Athletics	John McGraw^{†}	New York Giants
July 10, 1934	American (2–0–0 AL)	9–7	Polo Grounds	Joe Cronin^{†}	Washington Senators	Bill Terry^{†}	New York Giants
July 8, 1935	American (3–0–0 AL)	4–1	Cleveland Stadium	Mickey Cochrane^{†}	Detroit Tigers	Frankie Frisch^{†}	St. Louis Cardinals
July 7, 1936	National (3–1–0 AL)	4–3	National League Park	Joe McCarthy^{†}	New York Yankees	Charlie Grimm	Chicago Cubs
July 7, 1937	American (4–1–0 AL)	8–3	Griffith Stadium	Joe McCarthy^{†}	New York Yankees	Bill Terry^{†}	New York Giants
July 6, 1938	National (4–2–0 AL)	4–1	Crosley Field	Joe McCarthy^{†}	New York Yankees	Bill Terry^{†}	New York Giants
July 11, 1939	American (5–2–0 AL)	3–1	Yankee Stadium	Joe McCarthy^{†}	New York Yankees	Gabby Hartnett^{†}	Chicago Cubs
July 9, 1940	National (5–3–0 AL)	4–0	Sportsman's Park	Joe Cronin^{†}	Boston Red Sox	Bill McKechnie^{†}	Cincinnati Reds
July 8, 1941	American (6–3–0 AL)	7–5	Briggs Stadium	Del Baker	Detroit Tigers	Bill McKechnie^{†}	Cincinnati Reds
July 6, 1942	American (7–3–0 AL)	3–1	Polo Grounds	Joe McCarthy^{†}	New York Yankees	Leo Durocher^{†}	Brooklyn Dodgers
July 13, 1943	American (8–3–0 AL)	5–3	Shibe Park	Joe McCarthy^{†}	New York Yankees	Billy Southworth^{†}	St. Louis Cardinals
July 11, 1944	National (8–4–0 AL)	7–1	Forbes Field	Joe McCarthy^{†}	New York Yankees	Billy Southworth^{†}	St. Louis Cardinals
July 10, 1945	Game canceled due to World War II-related travel restrictions. Game was originally scheduled to be held at Fenway Park in Boston, Massachusetts.						
July 9, 1946	American (9–4–0 AL)	12–0	Fenway Park	Steve O'Neill	Detroit Tigers	Charlie Grimm	Chicago Cubs
July 8, 1947	American (10–4–0 AL)	2–1	Wrigley Field	Joe Cronin^{†}	Boston Red Sox	Eddie Dyer	St. Louis Cardinals
July 13, 1948	American (11–4–0 AL)	5–2	Sportsman's Park	Bucky Harris^{†}	New York Yankees	Leo Durocher^{†}	Brooklyn Dodgers
July 12, 1949	American (12–4–0 AL)	11–7	Ebbets Field	Lou Boudreau^{†}	Cleveland Indians	Billy Southworth^{†}	Boston Braves
July 11, 1950	National (12–5–0 AL)	4–3	Comiskey Park	Casey Stengel^{†}	New York Yankees	Burt Shotton	Brooklyn Dodgers
July 10, 1951	National (12–6–0 AL)	8–3	Briggs Stadium	Casey Stengel^{†}	New York Yankees	Eddie Sawyer	Philadelphia Phillies
July 8, 1952	National (12–7–0 AL)	3–2	Shibe Park	Casey Stengel^{†}	New York Yankees	Leo Durocher^{†}	New York Giants
July 14, 1953	National (12–8–0 AL)	5–1	Crosley Field	Casey Stengel^{†}	New York Yankees	Charlie Dressen	Brooklyn Dodgers
July 13, 1954	American (13–8–0 AL)	11–9	Cleveland Stadium	Casey Stengel^{†}	New York Yankees	Walter Alston^{†}	Brooklyn Dodgers
July 12, 1955	National (13–9–0 AL)	6–5	County Stadium	Al López^{†}	Cleveland Indians	Leo Durocher^{†}	New York Giants
July 10, 1956	National (13–10–0 AL)	7–3	Griffith Stadium	Casey Stengel^{†}	New York Yankees	Walter Alston^{†}	Brooklyn Dodgers
July 9, 1957	American (14–10–0 AL)	6–5	Busch Stadium	Casey Stengel^{†}	New York Yankees	Walter Alston^{†}	Brooklyn Dodgers
July 8, 1958	American (15–10–0 AL)	4–3	Memorial Stadium	Casey Stengel^{†}	New York Yankees	Fred Haney	Milwaukee Braves
July 7, 1959	National (15–11–0 AL)	5–4	Forbes Field	Casey Stengel^{†}	New York Yankees	Fred Haney	Milwaukee Braves
August 3, 1959	American (16–11–0 AL)	5–3	Los Angeles Coliseum	Casey Stengel^{†}	New York Yankees	Fred Haney	Milwaukee Braves
July 11, 1960	National (16–12–0 AL)	5–3	Municipal Stadium	Al López^{†}	Chicago White Sox	Walter Alston^{†}	Los Angeles Dodgers
July 13, 1960	National (16–13–0 AL)	6–0	Yankee Stadium	Al López^{†}	Chicago White Sox	Walter Alston^{†}	Los Angeles Dodgers
July 11, 1961	National (16–14–0 AL)	5–4	Candlestick Park	Paul Richards (Note: Casey Stengel was fired by the New York Yankees following the 1960 World Series. Paul Richards was chosen as his replacement since the Baltimore Orioles finished in second place in 1960.)	Baltimore Orioles	Danny Murtaugh	Pittsburgh Pirates
July 31, 1961	TIE (16–14–1 AL)	1–1	Fenway Park	Paul Richards	Baltimore Orioles	Danny Murtaugh	Pittsburgh Pirates
July 10, 1962	National (16–15–1 AL)	3–1	D.C. Stadium	Ralph Houk	New York Yankees	Fred Hutchinson	Cincinnati Reds
July 30, 1962	American (17–15–1 AL)	9–4	Wrigley Field	Ralph Houk	New York Yankees	Fred Hutchinson	Cincinnati Reds
July 9, 1963	National (17–16–1 AL)	5–3	Cleveland Stadium	Ralph Houk	New York Yankees	Alvin Dark	San Francisco Giants
July 7, 1964	National (17–17–1)	7–4	Shea Stadium	Al López^{†} (Note: Ralph Houk was made general manager of the New York Yankees following the 1963 World Series. Al López was chosen as his replacement since the Chicago White Sox finished in second place in 1963.)	Chicago White Sox	Walter Alston^{†}	Los Angeles Dodgers
July 13, 1965	National (18–17–1 NL)	6–5	Metropolitan Stadium	Al López^{†} (Note: Yogi Berra was fired by the New York Yankees following the 1964 World Series. Al López was chosen as his replacement since the Chicago White Sox finished in second place in 1964.)	Chicago White Sox	Gene Mauch	Philadelphia Phillies
July 12, 1966	National (19–17–1 NL)	2–1	Busch Memorial Stadium	Sam Mele	Minnesota Twins	Walter Alston^{†}	Los Angeles Dodgers
July 11, 1967	National (20–17–1 NL)	2–1	Anaheim Stadium	Hank Bauer	Baltimore Orioles	Walter Alston^{†}	Los Angeles Dodgers
July 9, 1968	National (21–17–1 NL)	1–0	Astrodome	Dick Williams^{†}	Boston Red Sox	Red Schoendienst^{†}	St. Louis Cardinals
July 23, 1969	National (22–17–1 NL)	9–3	RFK Stadium	Mayo Smith	Detroit Tigers	Red Schoendienst^{†}	St. Louis Cardinals
July 14, 1970	National (23–17–1 NL)	5–4	Riverfront Stadium	Earl Weaver^{†}	Baltimore Orioles	Gil Hodges^{†}	New York Mets
July 13, 1971	American (23–18–1 NL)	6–4	Tiger Stadium	Earl Weaver^{†}	Baltimore Orioles	Sparky Anderson^{†}	Cincinnati Reds
July 25, 1972	National (24–18–1 NL)	4–3	Atlanta Stadium	Earl Weaver^{†}	Baltimore Orioles	Danny Murtaugh	Pittsburgh Pirates
July 24, 1973	National (25–18–1 NL)	7–1	Royals Stadium	Dick Williams^{†}	Oakland Athletics	Sparky Anderson^{†}	Cincinnati Reds
July 23, 1974	National (26–18–1 NL)	7–2	Three Rivers Stadium	Dick Williams^{†}	California Angels (Note: Williams won the 1973 A.L. pennant with the Oakland Athletics but resigned after 1973 World Series and became manager of the California Angels.)	Yogi Berra^{†}	New York Mets
July 15, 1975	National (27–18–1 NL)	6–3	County Stadium	Alvin Dark	Oakland Athletics	Walter Alston^{†}	Los Angeles Dodgers
July 13, 1976	National (28–18–1 NL)	7–1	Veterans Stadium	Darrell Johnson	Boston Red Sox	Sparky Anderson^{†}	Cincinnati Reds
July 19, 1977	National (29–18–1 NL)	7–5	Yankee Stadium	Billy Martin	New York Yankees	Sparky Anderson^{†}	Cincinnati Reds
July 11, 1978	National (30–18–1 NL)	7–3	San Diego Stadium	Billy Martin	New York Yankees	Tommy Lasorda^{†}	Los Angeles Dodgers
July 17, 1979	National (31–18–1 NL)	7–6	Kingdome	Bob Lemon^{†}	New York Yankees	Tommy Lasorda^{†}	Los Angeles Dodgers
July 8, 1980	National (32–18–1 NL)	4–2	Dodger Stadium	Earl Weaver^{†}	Baltimore Orioles	Chuck Tanner	Pittsburgh Pirates
August 9, 1981	National (33–18–1 NL)	5–4	Cleveland Stadium	Jim Frey	Kansas City Royals	Dallas Green	Philadelphia Phillies
July 13, 1982	National (34–18–1 NL)	4–1	Olympic Stadium	Billy Martin (Note: Bob Lemon was fired by the New York Yankees in June 1982. Billy Martin was chosen as his replacement since the Oakland Athletics finished with the best overall AL record in the strike-shortened 1981 season.)	Oakland Athletics	Tommy Lasorda^{†}	Los Angeles Dodgers
July 6, 1983	American (34–19–1 NL)	13–3	Comiskey Park	Harvey Kuenn	Milwaukee Brewers	Whitey Herzog^{†}	St. Louis Cardinals
July 10, 1984	National (35–19–1 NL)	3–1	Candlestick Park	Joe Altobelli	Baltimore Orioles	Paul Owens	Philadelphia Phillies
July 16, 1985	National (36–19–1 NL)	6–1	Hubert H. Humphrey Metrodome	Sparky Anderson^{†}	Detroit Tigers	Dick Williams^{†}	San Diego Padres
July 15, 1986	American (36–20–1 NL)	3–2	Astrodome	Dick Howser	Kansas City Royals	Whitey Herzog^{†}	St. Louis Cardinals
July 14, 1987	National (37–20–1 NL)	2–0	Oakland–Alameda County Coliseum	John McNamara	Boston Red Sox	Davey Johnson	New York Mets
July 12, 1988	American (37–21–1 NL)	2–1	Riverfront Stadium	Tom Kelly	Minnesota Twins	Whitey Herzog^{†}	St. Louis Cardinals
July 11, 1989	American (37–22–1 NL)	5–3	Anaheim Stadium	Tony La Russa^{†}	Oakland Athletics	Tommy Lasorda^{†}	Los Angeles Dodgers
July 10, 1990	American (37–23–1 NL)	2–0	Wrigley Field	Tony La Russa^{†}	Oakland Athletics	Roger Craig	San Francisco Giants
July 9, 1991	American (37–24–1 NL)	4–2	SkyDome	Tony La Russa^{†}	Oakland Athletics	Lou Piniella	Cincinnati Reds
July 14, 1992	American (37–25–1 NL)	13–6	Jack Murphy Stadium	Tom Kelly	Minnesota Twins	Bobby Cox^{†}	Atlanta Braves
July 13, 1993	American (37–26–1 NL)	9–3	Oriole Park at Camden Yards	Cito Gaston	Toronto Blue Jays	Bobby Cox^{†}	Atlanta Braves
July 12, 1994	National (38–26–1 NL)	8–7	Three Rivers Stadium	Cito Gaston	Toronto Blue Jays	Jim Fregosi	Philadelphia Phillies
July 11, 1995	National (39–26–1 NL)	3–2	The Ballpark in Arlington	Buck Showalter	New York Yankees	Felipe Alou	Montreal Expos
July 9, 1996	National (40–26–1 NL)	6–0	Veterans Stadium	Mike Hargrove	Cleveland Indians	Bobby Cox^{†}	Atlanta Braves
July 8, 1997	American (40–27–1 NL)	3–1	Jacobs Field	Joe Torre^{†}	New York Yankees	Bobby Cox^{†}	Atlanta Braves
July 7, 1998	American (40–28–1 NL)	13–8	Coors Field	Mike Hargrove	Cleveland Indians	Jim Leyland^{†}	Florida Marlins
July 13, 1999	American (40–29–1 NL)	4–1	Fenway Park	Joe Torre^{†}	New York Yankees	Bruce Bochy	San Diego Padres
July 11, 2000	American (40–30–1 NL)	6–3	Turner Field	Joe Torre^{†}	New York Yankees	Bobby Cox^{†}	Atlanta Braves
July 10, 2001	American (40–31–1 NL)	4–1	Safeco Field	Joe Torre^{†}	New York Yankees	Bobby Valentine	New York Mets
July 9, 2002	TIE (40–31–2 NL)	7–7	Miller Park	Joe Torre^{†}	New York Yankees	Bob Brenly	Arizona Diamondbacks
July 15, 2003	American (40–32–2 NL)	7–6	U.S. Cellular Field	Mike Scioscia	Anaheim Angels	Dusty Baker (Note: Baker won the 2002 N.L. pennant with the San Francisco Giants but resigned after 2002 World Series and became manager of the Chicago Cubs.)	Chicago Cubs
July 13, 2004	American (40–33–2 NL)	9–4	Minute Maid Park	Joe Torre^{†}	New York Yankees	Jack McKeon	Florida Marlins
July 12, 2005	American (40–34–2 NL)	7–5	Comerica Park	Terry Francona	Boston Red Sox	Tony La Russa^{†}	St. Louis Cardinals
July 11, 2006	American (40–35–2 NL)	3–2	PNC Park	Ozzie Guillén	Chicago White Sox	Phil Garner	Houston Astros
July 10, 2007	American (40–36–2 NL)	5–4	AT&T Park	Jim Leyland^{†}	Detroit Tigers	Tony La Russa^{†}	St. Louis Cardinals
July 15, 2008	American (40–37–2 NL)	4–3	Yankee Stadium	Terry Francona	Boston Red Sox	Clint Hurdle	Colorado Rockies
July 14, 2009	American (40–38–2 NL)	4–3	Busch Stadium	Joe Maddon	Tampa Bay Rays	Charlie Manuel	Philadelphia Phillies
July 13, 2010	National (41–38–2 NL)	3–1	Angel Stadium of Anaheim	Joe Girardi	New York Yankees	Charlie Manuel	Philadelphia Phillies
July 12, 2011	National (42–38–2 NL)	5–1	Chase Field	Ron Washington	Texas Rangers	Bruce Bochy	San Francisco Giants
July 10, 2012	National (43–38–2 NL)	8–0	Kauffman Stadium	Ron Washington	Texas Rangers	Tony La Russa	St. Louis Cardinals
July 16, 2013	American (43–39–2 NL)	3–0	Citi Field	Jim Leyland^{†}	Detroit Tigers	Bruce Bochy	San Francisco Giants
July 15, 2014	American (43–40–2 NL)	5–3	Target Field	John Farrell	Boston Red Sox	Mike Matheny	St. Louis Cardinals
July 14, 2015	American (43–41–2 NL)	6–3	Great American Ball Park	Ned Yost	Kansas City Royals	Bruce Bochy	San Francisco Giants
July 12, 2016	American (43–42–2 NL)	4–2	Petco Park	Ned Yost	Kansas City Royals	Terry Collins	New York Mets
July 11, 2017	American (43–43–2)	2–1	Marlins Park	Brad Mills (Note: Mills filled in for Terry Francona who had to leave due to an emergency surgery.)	Cleveland Indians	Joe Maddon	Chicago Cubs
July 17, 2018	American (44–43–2 AL)	8–6	Nationals Park	A. J. Hinch	Houston Astros	Dave Roberts	Los Angeles Dodgers
July 9, 2019	American (45–43–2 AL)	4–3	Progressive Field	Alex Cora	Boston Red Sox	Dave Roberts	Los Angeles Dodgers
July 14, 2020	Game canceled due to a delay in the start of the 2020 season as a result of the COVID-19 pandemic. Game was originally scheduled to be held at Dodger Stadium in Los Angeles, California.						
July 13, 2021	American (46–43–2 AL)	5–2	Coors Field	Kevin Cash	Tampa Bay Rays	Dave Roberts	Los Angeles Dodgers
July 19, 2022	American (47–43–2 AL)	3–2	Dodger Stadium	Dusty Baker	Houston Astros	Brian Snitker	Atlanta Braves
July 11, 2023	National (47–44–2 AL)	3–2	T-Mobile Park	Dusty Baker	Houston Astros	Rob Thomson	Philadelphia Phillies
July 16, 2024	American (48–44–2 AL)	5–3	Globe Life Field	Bruce Bochy	Texas Rangers	Torey Lovullo	Arizona Diamondbacks
July 15, 2025	National (48–45–2 AL)	7–6 (Note: The National League defeated the American League 4–3 in a swing-off tiebreaker.)	Truist Park	Aaron Boone	New York Yankees	Dave Roberts	Los Angeles Dodgers
July 14, 2026	American (49–45–2 AL)	4–0	Citizens Bank Park	John Schneider	Toronto Blue Jays	Dave Roberts	Los Angeles Dodgers
