= Mike Magpayo =

American college basketball coach (born 1979)

Current position
- Title: Head coach
- Team: Fordham Rams
- Conference: A10
- Record: 22–17 (.564)

Biographical details
- Born: November 9, 1979 (age 47); Los Angeles, California, U.S.
- Education: UC Santa Barbara ('01)

Coaching career (HC unless noted)
- 2010–2014: Columbia (assistant)
- 2014–2017: Campbell (assistant)
- 2018–2020: UC Riverside (assistant)
- 2020–2025: UC Riverside
- 2025–present: Fordham

Administrative career (AD unless noted)
- 2017–2018: San Francisco (Dir. of Basketball Ops.)

Head coaching record
- Overall: 111–80 (.581)

Accomplishments and honors

Awards
- Big West Coach of the Year (2023)

Mike Magpayo (born November 9, 1979) is an American men's college basketball head coach for the Fordham Rams. In July 2020, Magpayo became the first NCAA Division I men's basketball head coach of full Asian heritage.

== Early life ==
Magpayo is a native of Hacienda Heights, California. He attended UC Santa Barbara, graduating with a degree in business economics in 2001. He was a high school basketball coach from 2001 to 2010. Magpayo also served as the CEO of a multi-million dollar real estate company in Southern California.

== Coaching career ==
Magpayo served as an assistant at Columbia from 2010 to 2014. He was an assistant at Campbell from 2014 to 2017. During the 2016–17 season, Campbell reached the ASUN Conference championship game as well as the CIT quarterfinals in the school's first postseason appearance since 1992. Magpayo served as the director of operations at San Francisco during the 2017–18 season, helping the team to a 22–7 record.

Magpayo joined the staff of David Patrick at UC Riverside in 2018. He helped the team improve from nine wins in his first season to 17 wins in the 2019–20 season. In June 2020, he was promoted to associate head coach. Magpayo was named head coach on July 1, after Patrick left to become an assistant at Arkansas. Magpayo became the first NCAA Division I head coach of full Asian heritage.

After leading the Highlanders to a 14–8 record in his first season, on May 21, 2021, Magpayo signed a five-year extension with UC Riverside. On March 28, 2025, Magpayo signed a contract with Fordham University to become their head coach.

== Head coaching record ==
Record table
Season	Team	Overall	Conference	Standing	Postseason
UC Riverside (Big West Conference) (2020–2025)
2020–21	UC Riverside	14–8	8–4	3rd	
2021–22	UC Riverside	16–12	9–6	6th	
2022–23	UC Riverside	22–12	14–6	3rd	
2023–24	UC Riverside	16–18	10–10	T–5th	
2024–25	UC Riverside	21–13	14–6	T–3rd	NIT First round
UC Riverside:		89–63 (.586)	55–32 (.632)		
Fordham Rams (Atlantic 10 Conference) (2025–present)
2025–26	Fordham	17–15	8–10	T–8th	
2026–27	Fordham	5–2	0–0		
Fordham:		22–17 (.564)	8–10 (.444)		
Total:		111–80 (.581)			
National champion Postseason invitational champion Conference regular season champion Conference regular season and conference tournament champion Division regular season champion Division regular season and conference tournament champion Conference tournament champion

== Personal life ==
Magpayo's parents Lito and Nenet were born and raised in the Philippines. His wife, Caroline, attended UC Riverside. They met in 2013, while Magpayo was an assistant at Columbia.
