= Kim Ng =

American baseball executive (born 1968)

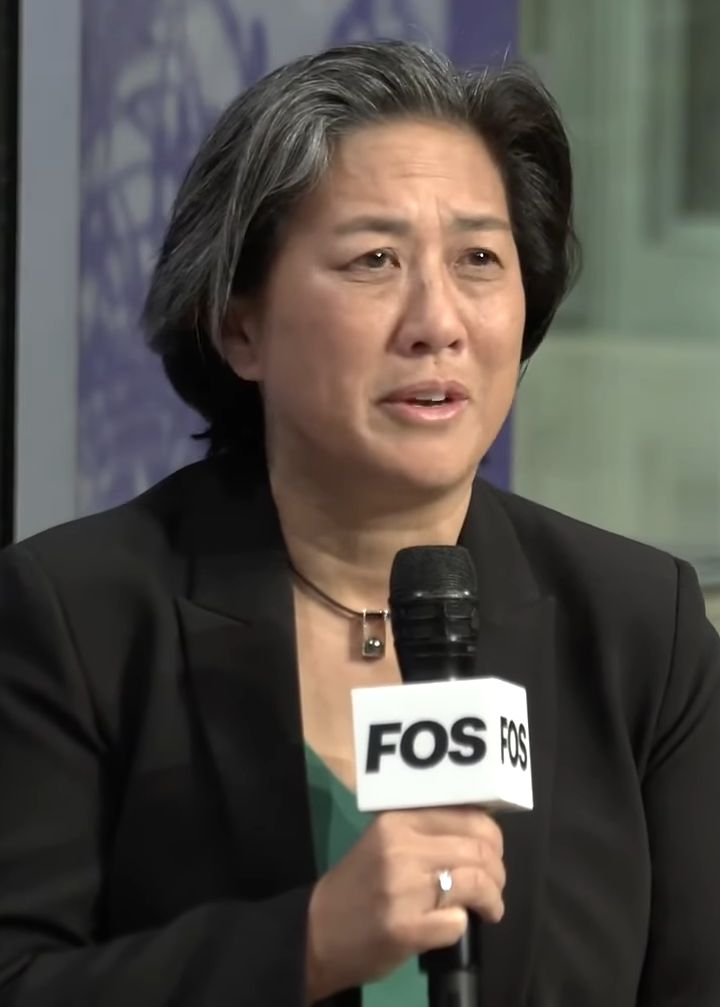
- Ng in 2025
- General Manager
- Born: November 17, 1968 (age 58); Indianapolis, Indiana, U.S.

Teams
- As assistant director of baseball operations: Chicago White Sox (1990–1996); As assistant general manager: New York Yankees (1998–2001); Los Angeles Dodgers (2002–2011); As general manager: Miami Marlins (2021–2023)

Career highlights and awards
- As assistant general manager: 3x World Series champion (1998–2000)
Chinese name
- Chinese: 伍佩琴
Transcriptions
Standard Mandarin
- Hanyu Pinyin: Wǔ Pèiqín
Yue: Cantonese
- Jyutping: Ng^{5} Pui^{3}kam^{4}
Southern Min
- Teochew Peng'im: Ngou6 Buê6 kim5

Kimberly J. Ng (/ɛŋ/; born November 17, 1968) is an American sports executive who has been the commissioner of the Athletes Unlimited Softball League (AUSL) since 2025. She was the general manager of the Miami Marlins of Major League Baseball (MLB) from 2021 to 2023. She was the first woman to serve as general manager of a team in the Big Four leagues in North America and the first person of full East Asian descent to serve as general manager of an MLB team.

A graduate of the University of Chicago, Ng played college softball. She then worked her way up in the front office of several MLB teams and became a vice president of the league.

== Early life ==
Ng was born in Indianapolis, Indiana, the first of five daughters, to Virginia and Jin Ng. Her father, an American of Cantonese Chinese descent, was a financial analyst, and her mother, Thailand-born of Chinese descent, was a banker. She attended elementary school in Fresh Meadows, Queens and junior high in Glen Cove, New York. Her interest in baseball started when she played stickball on the street in Queens and her father taught her about sports. She played tennis and softball at Ridgewood High School in Ridgewood, New Jersey and graduated in 1986. She graduated from the University of Chicago in 1990, where she played softball for four years and was named MVP infielder, and earned a B.A. in public policy. During her senior year at the University of Chicago, she served as president of the university's Women's Athletic Association.

== Career ==
Ng began her career as an intern with the Chicago White Sox after graduating from the University of Chicago and her first project was to conduct research on Rule 5 draftees which took advantage of Ng's love of statistics and analyzing scouting reports. She was hired full time in 1991 and became special projects analyst before being promoted to assistant director of baseball operations under then-GM Ron Schueler in 1995. In 1995 she became the youngest person, and the first woman, to present a salary arbitration case in the major leagues when she worked for the White Sox, regarding the case of pitcher Alex Fernandez, and won. Prompted by a desire to expand her networks and learn how executives from other clubs conducted business, Ng then worked in the offices of the American League in 1997, where she was director of waivers and records, reviewing all transactions.

In March 1998, she was recruited by general manager Brian Cashman to work for the New York Yankees as assistant general manager, becoming the youngest in the major leagues at age 29, and the second woman ever to hold the position behind only Elaine Weddington Steward, who in 1990 became the assistant general manager of the Boston Red Sox. Ng joined the Los Angeles Dodgers as vice president and assistant general manager in 2001. In 2003, Bill Singer was fired from his position as special assistant of the New York Mets after making drunken racist remarks against Ng at a hotel bar during general managers' meetings, including asking her, "Where are you from?" and speaking in a mock Chinese accent.

In 2005, Ng interviewed for the vacant position of Dodgers general manager. No woman had ever been a GM in any major sport. The Dodgers hired Ned Colletti as their GM, who immediately kept Ng on as his assistant. Between 2005 and 2020, Ng interviewed for the general manager position with at least five teams, including the Seattle Mariners, San Diego Padres, Anaheim Angels, and San Francisco Giants. On March 8, 2011, Ng announced she was leaving the Dodgers to become senior vice president of baseball operations for Major League Baseball, where she would report to former Yankees and Dodgers manager Joe Torre.

=== Marlins general manager ===
On November 13, 2020, Ng was hired as general manager of the Miami Marlins. She became the first woman to become a general manager of a men's team in the history of major North American sports, as well as the first female Asian-American and first East Asian-American general manager in MLB history. Upon being unveiled as the new Marlins' general manager, Ng received congratulatory messages from figures such as Michelle Obama, Billie Jean King, and Martina Navratilova.

On September 30, 2023, with the Marlins' 7–3 win in Pittsburgh, the Marlins clinched their fourth postseason berth, making her the first woman GM in MLB history to lead a playoff team. It was the club's first postseason appearance since 2020, and their first full season postseason appearance since 2003, although Ng's team was immediately eliminated without a playoff win. In October, Ng declined to exercise her option for the 2024 season, reportedly because she learned the team sought to hire a president of baseball operations, which would have left her second in command in her department.

=== Athletes Unlimited Softball League ===
In July 2024, Ng joined the Athletes Unlimited Pro Softball as a senior advisor. She was named commissioner of the Athletes Unlimited Softball League in April 2025. As commissioner, Ng oversaw the league's June 2025 debut with four touring teams and its transition to six city-based teams for the 2026 season.

== Awards ==
In 2014, Bleacher Report included Ng on its list of the 25 Most Powerful Women in Sports. In 2015, Forbes ranked Ng #13 on its list of the most influential minorities in sports and #5 on its list of the most powerful women in sports. In 2017, Adweek named Ng one of the most powerful women in sports. Ng was selected for the inaugural 2021 Forbes 50 Over 50 made up of entrepreneurs, leaders, scientists, and creators over age 50.

== Personal life ==
Ng is married to Tony Markward, co-owner of Silas Wines in Oregon.

== See also ==
- Women in baseball
