= Alex Cora =

Puerto Rican baseball player and manager (born 1975)

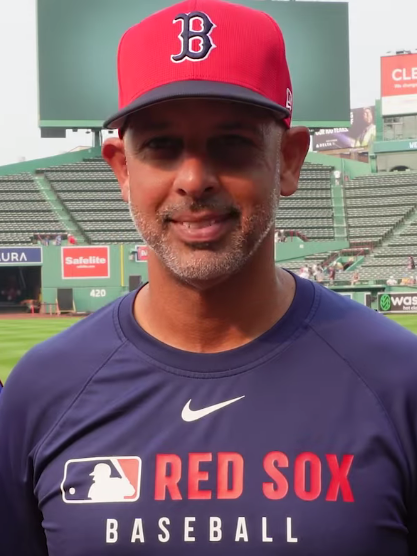
- Cora with the Boston Red Sox in 2025
- Shortstop / Second baseman / Manager
- Born: October 18, 1975 (age 51); Caguas, Puerto Rico
- Batted: Left Threw: Right

MLB debut
- June 7, 1998, for the Los Angeles Dodgers

Last MLB appearance
- September 28, 2011, for the Washington Nationals

MLB statistics
- Batting average: .243
- Home runs: 35
- Runs batted in: 286
- Managerial record: 620–541
- Winning %: .534
- Stats at Baseball Reference
- Managerial record at Baseball Reference

Teams
- As player: Los Angeles Dodgers (1998–2004); Cleveland Indians (2005); Boston Red Sox (2005–2008); New York Mets (2009–2010); Texas Rangers (2010); Washington Nationals (2011); As manager: Boston Red Sox (2018–2019, 2021–2026); As coach: Houston Astros (2017)

Career highlights and awards
- 3× World Series champion (2007, 2017, 2018)

Jose Alexander Cora (born October 18, 1975) is a Puerto Rican professional baseball manager and former infielder who most recently managed the Boston Red Sox in Major League Baseball (MLB). He previously played in MLB for 14 seasons with the Red Sox, Los Angeles Dodgers, Cleveland Indians, New York Mets, Texas Rangers, and Washington Nationals.

After retiring as a player, Cora served as the bench coach for the Houston Astros when they won their first World Series title in 2017. Cora was named Boston's manager the following season, winning a franchise-best 108 games and leading the team to victory in the 2018 World Series. He is the fifth MLB manager to win the World Series in his first season and the first Puerto Rican manager of a World Series-winning team.

Following the 2019 season, Cora was implicated in a sign-stealing scandal during his time with the Astros. Amid an investigation to determine if he took part in another sign-stealing scandal with the Red Sox, Cora and the Red Sox mutually agreed to part ways before the 2020 season. Cora was subsequently suspended through the 2020 playoffs for his role in the Astros' scandal. After his suspension ended, he returned to the Red Sox as their manager for the 2021 season. The Red Sox fired Cora during the 2026 season.

== Playing career ==
=== Early career ===
Cora was drafted in the 12th round of the 1993 Major League Baseball draft by the Minnesota Twins, but did not sign a contract and decided instead to play collegiate baseball at the University of Miami. While there, Cora was named to the College World Series all-tournament team in both 1995 and 1996. He led the team to the title game in 1996, a game they lost to Louisiana State University.

Cora was rated by Baseball America as the best collegiate defensive player going into the 1996 draft. Cora was drafted by the Los Angeles Dodgers in the third round, and played 61 games of the 1996 season with the Class A-Advanced Vero Beach Dodgers, batting .257 with no home runs and 26 RBIs. He played the 1997 season with the Double-A San Antonio Missions; in 127 games he batted .234 with 3 home runs and 48 RBIs. Cora spent parts of the 1998, 1999, and 2000 seasons with the Triple-A Albuquerque Dukes, hitting .264 in 81 games, .308 in 80 games, and .373 in 30 games, respectively.

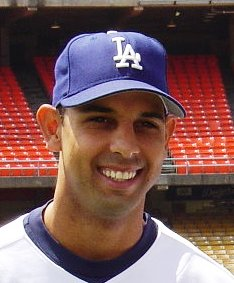
Cora with the Dodgers in 2004

=== Los Angeles Dodgers ===
Cora made his major league debut on June 7, 1998, with the Los Angeles Dodgers against the Seattle Mariners; his brother Joey Cora was Seattle's starting second baseman in the game. Cora spent the next seven years in Los Angeles, appearing in a total of 684 games while batting .246 with 27 home runs and 173 RBI. During his time with the Dodgers, he played at second base and shortstop. During the 2000 and 2001 seasons, Cora mostly played shortstop as the Dodgers moved the aging Mark Grudzielanek to second base. With the emergence of César Izturis in 2002, and the trade of Grudzielanek to the Chicago Cubs in December of the same year, Cora spent the rest of his stint with the Dodgers as their primary second baseman.

Cora played in one postseason series with the Dodgers, the 2004 NLDS, which the Dodgers lost to the St. Louis Cardinals. Cora was the Dodgers' second baseman in all four games, batting 2-for-15 (.133) during the series.

He has the record for longest at-bat for a Dodger, where on May 12, 2004, against pitcher Matt Clement, he fouled off 18 pitches, then hit a home run.

=== Cleveland Indians ===
On January 18, 2005, Cora signed as a free agent with the Cleveland Indians. He appeared in 49 games with the Indians, with 22 starts at shortstop and 14 at second base; he batted .205 with a home run and 8 RBI. On July 7, 2005, Cora was traded to the Boston Red Sox for infielder Ramón Vázquez.

=== Boston Red Sox ===
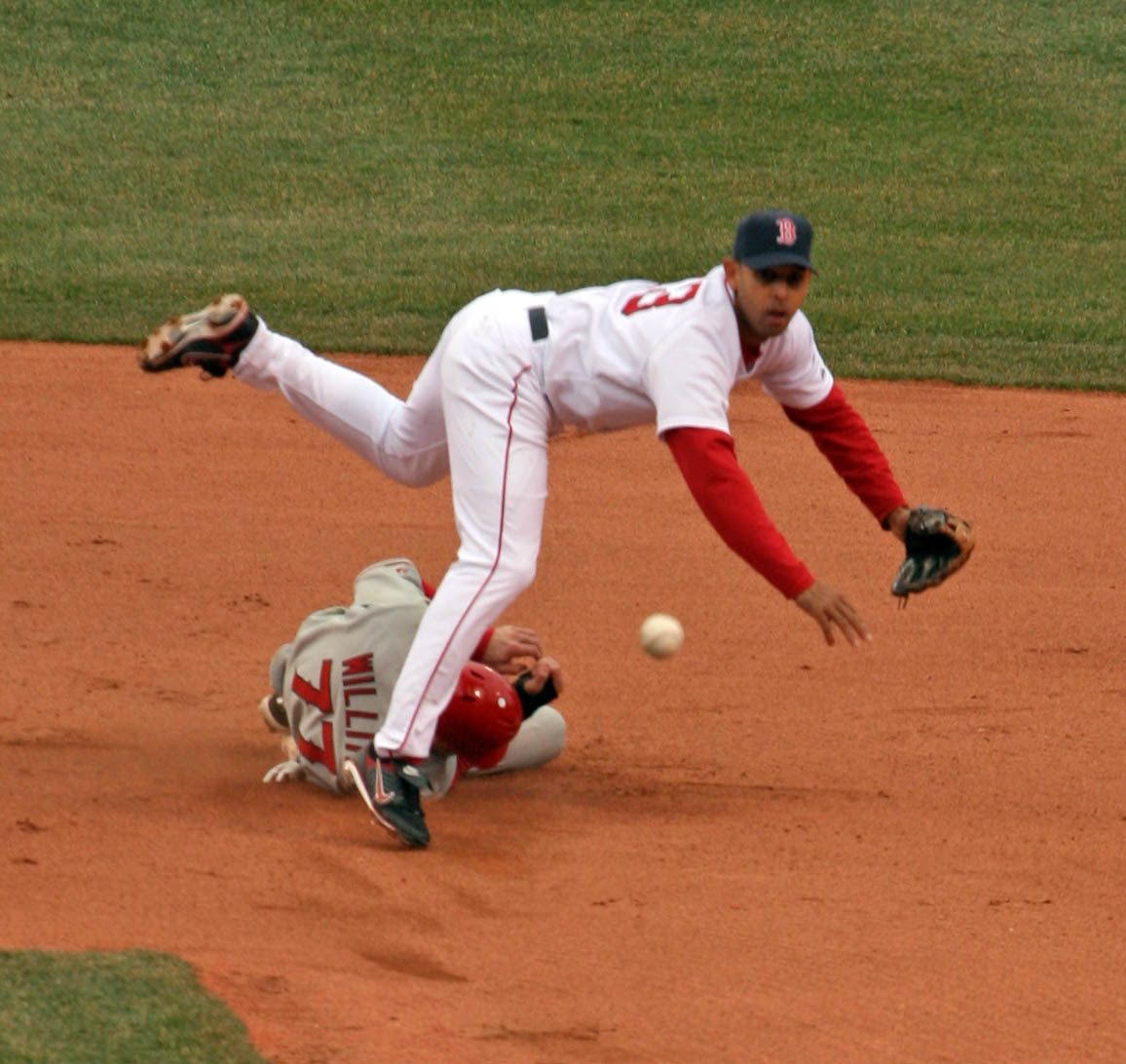
Cora with the Red Sox, turning a double-play against the Los Angeles Angels at Fenway Park on April 16, 2007

Cora made his Red Sox debut on July 7, 2005, and through the end of the regular season appeared in a total of 47 games for Boston, batting .269 with two home runs and 16 RBI. In the 2005 ALDS, which Boston lost to the Chicago White Sox in a three-game sweep, Cora played in one game as a defensive replacement, without a plate appearance.

Cora was originally intended to back up shortstop Édgar Rentería. With the trade of Rentería to the Atlanta Braves in December 2005, Cora was being eyed to take the position of starting shortstop, until the Red Sox acquired Álex González in February 2006. For the 2006 season, Cora appeared in 96 games, batting .238 with one home run and 18 RBI.

Cora was a member of the Red Sox team that won the 2007 World Series. During the regular season, he appeared in 83 games and batted .246 with three home runs and 18 RBI. In the postseason, he appeared as a late-innings defensive replacement in two games of the 2007 ALCS and two games of the World Series. He had one plate appearance, a sacrifice bunt in World Series game 3.

For the 2008 regular season, Cora played in 75 games, batting .270 with no home runs and 9 RBI. He appeared in four postseason games; two games of the 2008 ALDS, which Boston won, and two games of the 2008 ALCS, which Boston lost. He batted 4-for-26 (.154) with no home runs and one RBI. These games were the final postseason appearances for Cora as a player.

On October 30, 2008, Cora became a free agent. In his four seasons with Boston, he appeared in 301 regular season games, batting .252 with six home runs and 61 RBI.

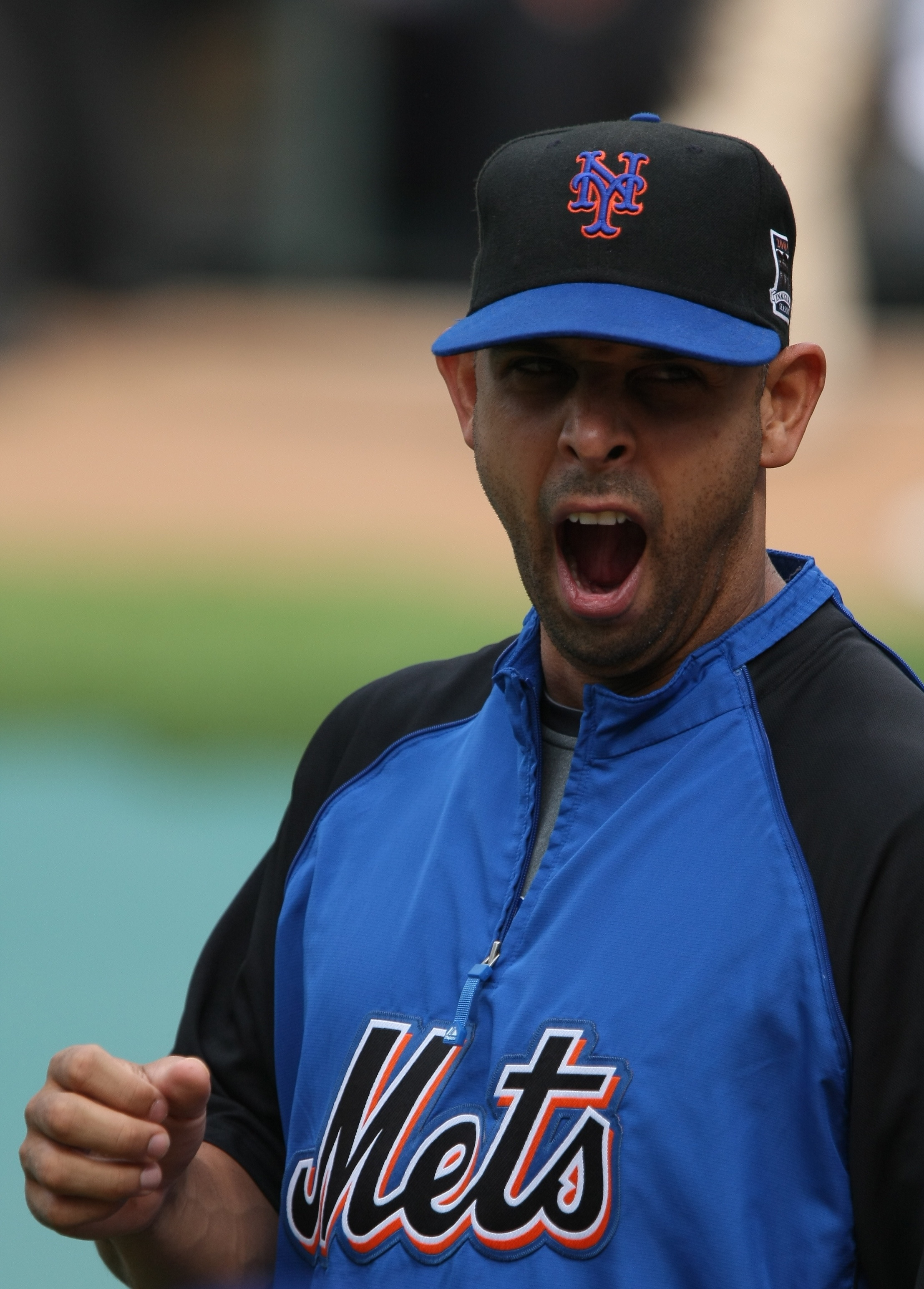
Cora with the Mets in 2009

=== New York Mets ===
On January 22, 2009, Cora signed a one-year deal with the New York Mets. During the 2009 season, he appeared in 82 games, batting .251 with one home run and 18 RBI. On November 30, 2009, Cora re-signed with the Mets for the 2010 season, with an option for 2011. He was released by the Mets on August 7, 2010 — at the time, he was batting .207 with no home runs and 20 RBI, having played in 62 games of the 2010 season. In his time with the Mets, Cora appeared in a total of 144 games, with a .234 batting average, one home run, and 38 RBI.

=== Texas Rangers ===
On August 17, 2010, Cora signed a minor league contract with the Texas Rangers, and was assigned to their Triple-A affiliate Oklahoma City, where he appeared in six games, batting 4-for-22 (.182). He then played four games for the Rangers, batting 2-for-7 (.286). The Rangers released Cora on September 7. Despite his limited time with Texas, the team later rewarded him with an AL Championship ring.

=== Washington Nationals ===
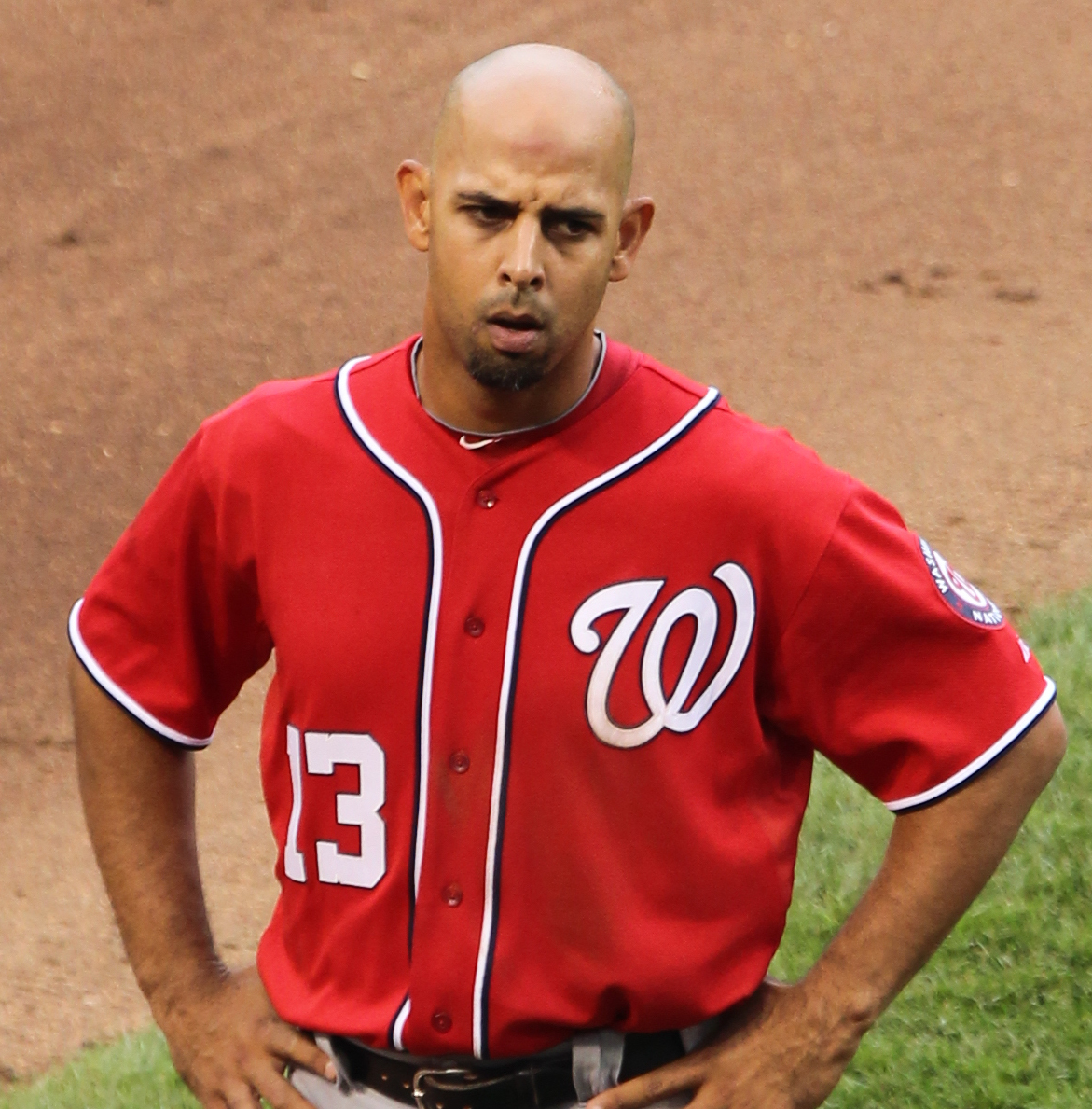
Cora with the Nationals in 2011

In January 2011, the Nationals signed Cora to a minor league contract. During the 2011 season, he appeared in 91 games for Washington, batting .224 with no home runs and 6 RBI. Cora's final MLB appearance was with the Nationals on September 28, when he tripled as a pinch hitter against the Florida Marlins.

=== Late career ===
Following the 2011 season, Cora played winter baseball in Puerto Rico, after which he announced his retirement; shortly thereafter he clarified that he was retiring only from winter baseball. He agreed to a minor league contract with the St. Louis Cardinals on February 5, 2012. After batting .208 with one RBI in 24 plate appearances in spring training, Cora was released by the defending World Series champions on March 25, 2012.

=== Notable games ===
With the Dodgers on May 12, 2004, Cora had an 18-pitch at-bat against Chicago Cubs starting pitcher Matt Clement. Facing a 2–1 count, Cora fouled off 14 straight pitches before finally hitting a home run. As of 2024, it is tied for fifth place among the longest at bats since 1988, when statisticians began tracking pitch counts. Of the longest five at bats (including ties), Cora's is the only one that resulted in a hit. So much time elapsed during the at bat that Cora's brother Joey joked that he and a friend were watching the game at a restaurant, ordering their first beer during the first pitch, and by the time Cora homered they were "so drunk that we had to call a cab to take us home."

Cora played in the two longest nine-inning games in MLB history. The first was a 4-hour, 27-minute game on October 5, 2001, between the Dodgers and the San Francisco Giants. The second game, and the longest on record, was a 4-hour, 45-minute game on August 18, 2006, the second game of a doubleheader between the Red Sox and the New York Yankees. Cora entered the 2001 game as a defensive replacement in the eighth inning, and was the starting shortstop in the 2006 game.

In the third game of the 2018 World Series, Cora managed the Red Sox in the longest game in World Series history both by time (7 hours and 20 minutes) and innings (18). The Los Angeles Dodgers, being down two games to none, won 3–2 on a walk-off home run by Max Muncy.

=== International career ===
Cora played for the Puerto Rico national baseball team in the World Baseball Classic during 2006 and 2009; he batted 2-for-15 (.133) and 1-for-8 (.125) in those tournaments, respectively. In March 2016, Cora was named as general manager of the team; he served in that position through the 2017 World Baseball Classic.

Prior to coaching and managing in MLB, Cora was general manager of Criollos de Caguas, a team in the Puerto Rican Winter League, for five seasons, also serving as the team's manager for two of those seasons.

== Coaching and managerial career ==
=== Houston Astros bench coach ===
On November 15, 2016, Cora became the bench coach for the Houston Astros. Cora assumed managerial duties on three occasions during the 2017 season, following ejections of Astros manager A. J. Hinch.

On August 25, 2017, Cora was ejected from a game against the Los Angeles Angels by home plate umpire Laz Díaz. Cora argued that the baseball had too much dirt on it and should be removed from play; it was Cora's first career MLB ejection.

The 2017 Astros finished with a record of 101–61 and went on to win the World Series in seven games.

=== Boston Red Sox manager (first stint) ===
During the 2017 ALCS, Cora interviewed for the open managerial position of the Boston Red Sox. It was subsequently reported that Cora would be named as Red Sox manager. On October 22, the day after the Astros defeated the New York Yankees in the ALCS, the Red Sox announced a three-year managerial contract for Cora, for the 2018 through 2020 seasons, with an option for 2021.

Cora formally assumed the role on November 2, 2017, following the World Series. On August 3, 2018, Cora was ejected for the first time as a manager by home plate umpire Adam Hamari for arguing warnings being issued to both benches by first base umpire and crew chief Phil Cuzzi in a game against the Yankees. Cora and the 2018 Red Sox finished with 108 wins and 54 losses.

In the American League Division Series, the Red Sox eliminated the New York Yankees, three games to one, and advanced to the American League Championship Series. Cora received his first postseason ejection on October 13, in Game 1 of the ALCS against the Houston Astros. He was ejected by home plate umpire James Hoye between the fifth and sixth innings for arguing balls and strikes. On October 18, Cora's 43rd birthday, the Red Sox defeated the Astros, 4–1, to win the ALCS in five games. The Red Sox then defeated the Los Angeles Dodgers in the World Series in five games to give Cora his first championship as a manager and third overall. Cora became the fifth rookie manager to win a World Series, the others being Bob Brenly in 2001, Ralph Houk in 1961, Eddie Dyer in 1946, and Bucky Harris in 1924. In voting for the AL Manager of the Year Award, Cora finished second to Bob Melvin of the Oakland Athletics.

On November 14, 2018, the Red Sox announced that they had renegotiated Cora's contract, including an extension through the 2021 season, with a club option for 2022.

==== Electronic sign stealing scandal ====
On November 13, 2019, it was reported that Cora, along with former Astros player Carlos Beltrán, played a key role in the Houston Astros sign stealing scandal during their time with the team, which included Houston's 2017 championship season. Cora was interviewed during MLB's investigation of the Astros, with the Red Sox offering their "full cooperation". On January 7, 2020, The Athletic published a report alleging that the 2018 Red Sox broke MLB rules by using a video replay room during regular season games to decipher the signs of opposing catchers, according to three unnamed sources who were with the team that year. On January 13, MLB's findings regarding Houston's sign stealing were announced, including that Cora "was the only non-player involved in the subterfuge." However, commissioner Rob Manfred deferred any discipline for Cora until the conclusion of the separate investigation into the 2018 Red Sox. This raised the possibility that Cora could face significant discipline from MLB, possibly as lengthy as the one-year suspension meted out to Astros manager A. J. Hinch.

The following day, Cora and the Red Sox mutually agreed to part ways. According to a joint statement issued by majority owner John Henry, chairman Tom Werner and president Sam Kennedy, all parties involved concluded that given the nature of the findings, Cora could not effectively lead the team. Cora issued a statement of his own saying that he "did not want to be a distraction" to the team.

On April 22, 2020, commissioner Rob Manfred issued findings from MLB's investigation about electronic sign-stealing by the 2018 Red Sox. The findings focused on the actions of the team's replay operator, who as a result was suspended for the 2020 season (including postseason) and the team forfeited their second-round selection in the 2020 MLB draft. About Cora, Manfred stated:

Alex Cora will be suspended through the conclusion of the 2020 Postseason for his conduct as the bench coach of the Houston Astros in 2017. While I will not impose additional discipline on Cora as a result of the conduct engaged in by [the Red Sox' replay operator] (because I do not find that he was aware of it), I do note that Cora did not effectively communicate to Red Sox players the sign-stealing rules that were in place for the 2018 season.

=== Boston Red Sox manager (second stint) ===
Cora was rehired as the Red Sox' manager on November 6, 2020, on a two-year contract for the 2021 and 2022 seasons, with a club option for the 2023 and 2024 seasons. On April 14, 2021, Cora earned the 200th win of his managerial career in the first game of a doubleheader against the Minnesota Twins. The 2021 Red Sox qualified for the postseason as a wild card, and advanced to the ALCS. On November 22, 2021, the Red Sox announced that they exercised their 2023–2024 option to extend Cora's contract as manager of the team.

During the 2022 season, Cora missed six games in the latter half of April after testing positive for COVID-19; bench coach Will Venable led the team in Cora's absence. His 19 challenges in 2022 were the fewest of any full-time major league managers, as were his eight overturns.

On July 24, 2024, the Red Sox announced that Cora agreed to a three-year contract extension, through the 2027 season.

After a 10–17 start to the 2026 season that left the Red Sox in last place of the American League East division, Cora was fired on April 25, 2026. In his two stints with the Red Sox, Cora led the team to three playoff appearances and one World Series championship. Cora's 620 wins as manager is the third-most all-time in franchise history.

One day after his firing, Philadelphia Phillies president of baseball operations Dave Dombrowski, whom Cora had worked under for the Red Sox from 2018 to 2019, offered to hire Cora to manage the team, as Dombrowski was planning to fire manager Rob Thomson. However, Cora declined the offer, citing a desire to spend more time with family. The Phillies would end up firing Thomson on April 28 and promoting bench coach Don Mattingly to interim manager.

== Managerial record ==
As of April 25, 2026

| Team | Year | Regular season | | | | | Postseason | | | |
| Team | Year | Games | Won | Lost | Win % | Finish | Won | Lost | Win % | Result |
|---|---|---|---|---|---|---|---|---|---|---|
| BOS | 2018 | 162 | 108 | 54 | .667 | 1st in AL East | 11 | 3 | .786 | Won World Series (LAD) |
| BOS | 2019 | 162 | 84 | 78 | .519 | 3rd in AL East | – | – | – | – |
| BOS | 2021 | 162 | 92 | 70 | .568 | 2nd in AL East | 6 | 5 | .545 | Lost ALCS (HOU) |
| BOS | 2022 | 162 | 78 | 84 | .481 | 5th in AL East | – | – | – | – |
| BOS | 2023 | 162 | 78 | 84 | .481 | 5th in AL East | – | – | – | – |
| BOS | 2024 | 162 | 81 | 81 | .500 | 3rd in AL East | – | – | – | – |
| BOS | 2025 | 162 | 89 | 73 | .549 | 3rd in AL East | 1 | 2 | .333 | Lost ALWC (NYY) |
| BOS | 2026 | 27 | 10 | 17 | .370 | Fired | – | – | – | – |
| Total | | 1,161 | 620 | 541 | .534 | | 18 | 10 | .643 | |

== Personal life ==
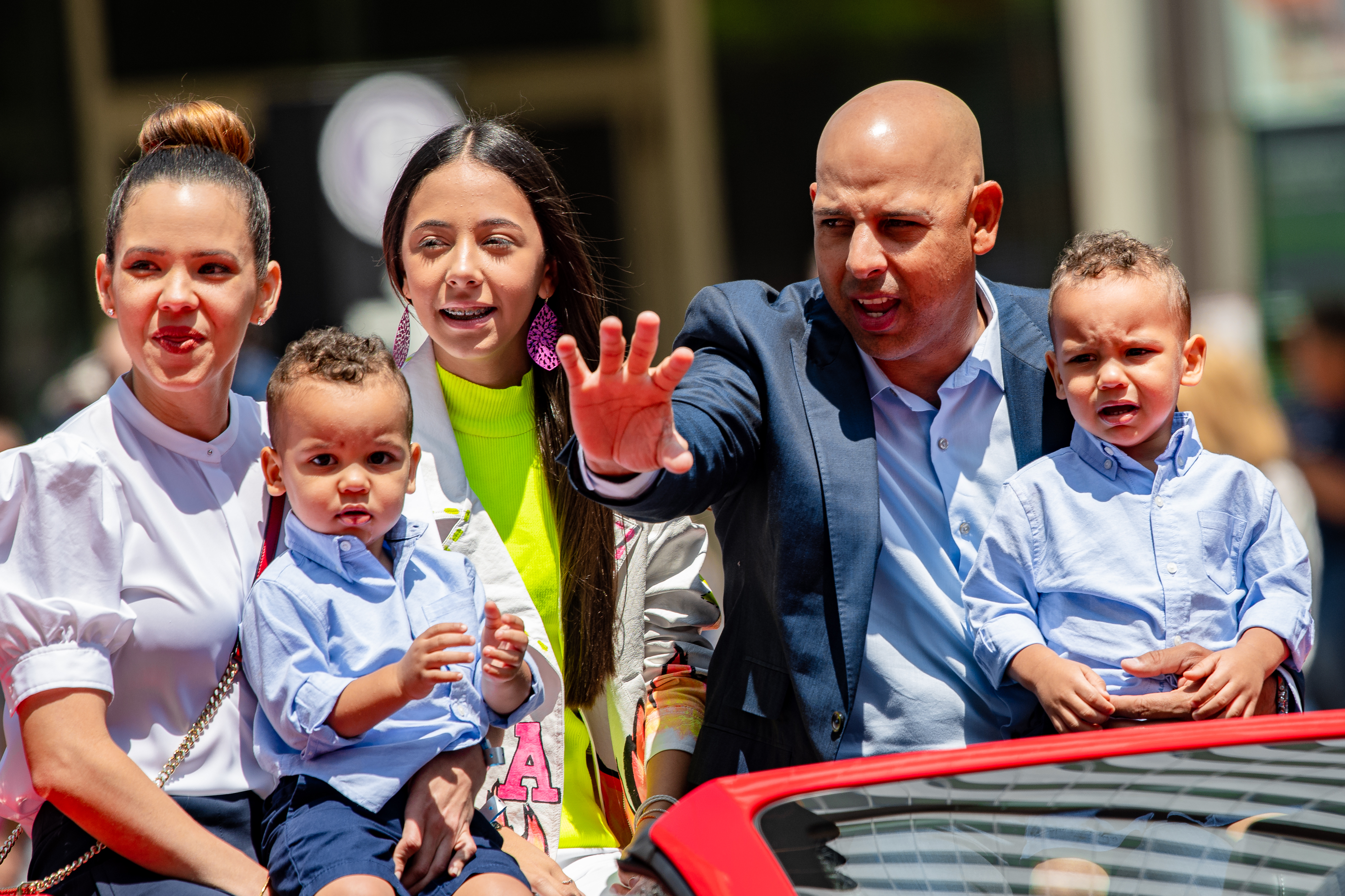
Cora and family members before the 2019 MLB All-Star Game

Cora lives in Caguas, Puerto Rico, during the off-season. He has four children, including twins born during the 2017 season. His older brother is Joey Cora, a former MLB utility player and current Detroit Tigers 3rd base coach.

Cora is a 2006 inductee of the University of Miami Sports Hall of Fame.

From February 2013 to November 2016, Cora was a color analyst for baseball on ESPN and ESPN Deportes.

After winning the 2018 World Series, Cora took the World Series trophy to his hometown of Caguas on November 3, 2018.

=== Philanthropy ===
After being hired as the Red Sox manager in 2017, Cora was involved in relief help for Puerto Rico after Hurricane Maria in 2017.

== See also ==
- List of Major League Baseball All-Star Game managers
- List of Major League Baseball players from Puerto Rico

Sporting positions
| Preceded by Trey Hillman | Houston Astros bench coach 2017 | Succeeded by Joe Espada |
