= Rich Cho =

American basketball executive

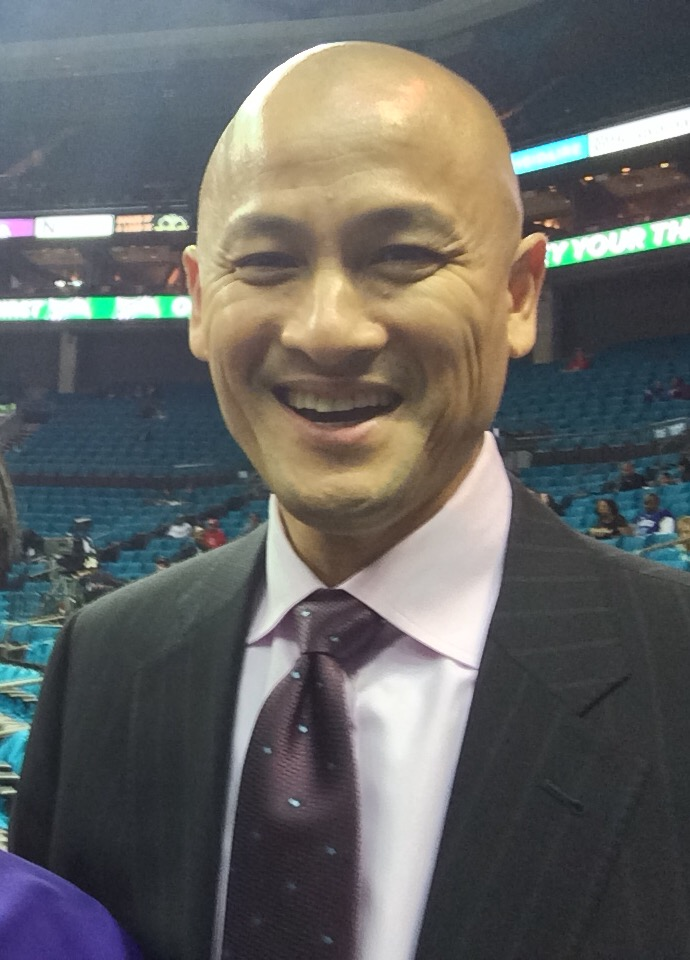
- Rich Cho before the Hornets' 2015–16 season first home game

Memphis Grizzlies
- Position: Vice President of Basketball Strategy
- League: NBA

Personal information
- Born: August 10, 1965 (age 61) Rangoon, Burma

Career information
- High school: Decatur (Federal Way, Washington)
- College: Washington State

Richard Cho (born August 10, 1965) is an American basketball executive who currently serves as the Vice President of Basketball Strategy of the Memphis Grizzlies of the National Basketball Association. Prior to the Grizzlies, Cho was the general manager of the Portland Trail Blazers and the Charlotte Hornets, and the assistant general manager of the Oklahoma City Thunder. Cho was the first Asian-American general manager in NBA history.

== Education and early career ==
Born in Rangoon, Burma to Alan (Aung Aung Cho) and Shirley Cho (Nwe Nwe Yi), Cho immigrated with his family to the United States in 1968. They were sponsored by a family in Fort Wayne, Indiana before moving to Federal Way, Washington. Cho's father worked the night shift at a convenience store to support the family. Cho graduated from Decatur High School and went on to Washington State University, where he earned a degree in mechanical engineering. He worked as an engineer at Boeing from 1990 to 1995.

== Basketball executive ==
In 1995, he was hired as an intern for the Seattle SuperSonics while finishing a J.D. degree from Pepperdine University School of Law. In 1997, he earned the degree and was hired as the SuperSonics' director of basketball affairs. In 2000, he was promoted to assistant general manager. Between 2000 and 2008 the Sonics made the playoffs twice. The high point was the 2004–05 season when the team advanced to the second round of the playoffs for the only time since 1997–98. However it was followed by several more down seasons culminating in a record of 20-62 during the 2007–08 season, the worst in franchise history. In 2008, Cho relocated to Oklahoma City when the league allowed the team under new ownership to leave Seattle. The team was renamed the Oklahoma City Thunder.

The Thunder utilized Cho's background in both law and mathematics when negotiating trades, free agent signings, and interpreting the NBA's complex collective bargaining agreement. The Thunder entered the playoffs in 2009–10 with a record of 50–32.

In July 2010, Cho returned to the Pacific Northwest, hired as the ninth general manager of the Portland Trail Blazers, replacing Kevin Pritchard, who was fired the previous month. Cho himself was fired less than a year after being hired. On June 14, 2011, the Charlotte Bobcats hired Cho as their new general manager, promoting previous GM Rod Higgins to president of basketball operations. The Hornets fired Cho on February 20, 2018. Cho was hired by the Grizzlies on April 17, 2019.

== Personal life ==
Cho and his wife Julie Heintz-Cho have two young daughters. Cho met his wife while studying law at Pepperdine University School of Law.

Cho's father, Alan, is a former journalist. His paternal grandfather, U Cho, was Burma's first education minister, while his maternal grandfather, Thant Gyi, was a former deputy education minister. Cho is the first cousin of Alex Wagner, television anchor and host of Now with Alex Wagner on MSNBC.
