= 2016 National League Division Series =

American baseball games

Teams
Team (Wins)		Manager	Season
Chicago Cubs (3)		Joe Maddon	103–58 (.640), GA: 17 1/2
San Francisco Giants (1)		Bruce Bochy	87–75 (.537), GB: 4
- Dates: October 7–11
- Television: FS1 (Games 1, 3–4); MLB Network (Game 2)
- TV announcers: Matt Vasgersian (Games 1, 3–4), Bob Costas (Game 2), John Smoltz, and Ken Rosenthal
- Radio: ESPN
- Radio announcers: Dan Shulman and Aaron Boone
- Umpires: John Hirschbeck (crew chief), Marvin Hudson, Mike Muchlinski, Alan Porter, Todd Tichenor and Larry Vanover; Replay: Chris Conroy, Kerwin Danley, Gerry Davis, Adrian Johnson.

Teams
Team (Wins)		Manager	Season
Los Angeles Dodgers (3)		Dave Roberts	91–71 (.562), GA: 4
Washington Nationals (2)		Dusty Baker	95–67 (.586), GA: 8
- Dates: October 7–13
- Television: FS1 (Games 1–2, 4–5); MLB Network (Game 3)
- TV announcers: Kenny Albert, Harold Reynolds, Tom Verducci, and J. P. Morosi (FS1); Bob Costas, Jim Kaat, and J. P. Morosi (MLBN)
- Radio: ESPN
- Radio announcers: Dave O'Brien and Jim Bowden
- Umpires: Dan Bellino, Manny González, Chris Guccione, Tom Hallion, Jeff Kellogg (crew chief) and Ron Kulpa; Replay: Chris Conroy, Kerwin Danley, Gerry Davis, Adrian Johnson.
- NLWC: San Francisco Giants defeated New York Mets, 3–0

The 2016 National League Division Series were two best-of-five playoff series on the National League side in Major League Baseball’s 2016 postseason to determine the participating teams in the 2016 National League Championship Series. The three divisional winners (seeded 1–3) and a fourth team—the winner of a one-game Wild Card playoff— played in two series. FS1 and MLB Network carried all the games in the United States.

These matchups were:

- (1) Chicago Cubs (NL Central champions) vs. (5) San Francisco Giants (Wild Card Game Winner): Cubs won the series, 3–1.
- (2) Washington Nationals (NL East champions) vs. (3) Los Angeles Dodgers (NL West champions): Dodgers won the series, 3–2.

The Dodgers defeated the Nationals in five games and reached the National League Championship Series for the first time since 2013.

The Cubs won the Division Series three games to one and advanced to the NLCS for the second consecutive year. This was the first and only playoff series loss of the Bruce Bochy-led Giants.

The Cubs went on to defeat the Dodgers in the NLCS, then win the 2016 World Series over the American League champion Cleveland Indians, their first World title since 1908.

== Matchups ==
=== Chicago Cubs vs. San Francisco Giants ===
Chicago won the series, 3–1.

Game	Date	Score	Location	Time	Attendance
1	October 7	San Francisco Giants – 0, Chicago Cubs – 1	Wrigley Field	2:30	42,148
2	October 8	San Francisco Giants – 2, Chicago Cubs – 5	Wrigley Field	3:03	42,392
3	October 10	Chicago Cubs – 5, San Francisco Giants – 6 (13)	AT&T Park	5:03	43,571
4	October 11	Chicago Cubs – 6, San Francisco Giants – 5	AT&T Park	3:25	43,166

=== Washington Nationals vs. Los Angeles Dodgers ===
Los Angeles won the series, 3–2.

Game	Date	Score	Location	Time	Attendance
1	October 7	Los Angeles Dodgers – 4, Washington Nationals – 3	Nationals Park	3:46	43,915
2	October 9	Los Angeles Dodgers – 2, Washington Nationals – 5	Nationals Park	3:55	43,826
3	October 10	Washington Nationals – 8, Los Angeles Dodgers – 3	Dodger Stadium	4:12	53,901
4	October 11	Washington Nationals – 5, Los Angeles Dodgers – 6	Dodger Stadium	3:44	49,617
5	October 13	Los Angeles Dodgers – 4, Washington Nationals – 3	Nationals Park	4:32	43,936

== Chicago vs. San Francisco ==
This was the second postseason meeting between the Cubs and Giants. Their last meeting was in the 1989 National League Championship Series, which the Giants won in five games. However, they did meet in a Wild Card tiebreaker in 1998 where the Cubs advanced, beating the Giants 5–3.

=== Game 1 ===
October 7, 2016 8:15 pm (CDT) at Wrigley Field in Chicago, Illinois 55 °F (13 °C), clear
Team	1	2	3	4	5	6	7	8	9	R	H	E
San Francisco	0	0	0	0	0	0	0	0	0	0	6	0
Chicago	0	0	0	0	0	0	0	1	X	1	3	0
WP: Jon Lester (1–0) LP: Johnny Cueto (0–1) Sv: Aroldis Chapman (1); Home runs: SF: None; CHC: Javier Báez (1); Attendance: 42,148; Boxscore

The Cubs began postseason play with starter Jon Lester on the mound facing Johnny Cueto for the Wild Card Game-winning Giants. In the pitching duel, Lester scattered five hits in eight innings of work, shutting out the Giants. Cueto also blanked the Cubs allowing only two hits until the eighth inning, when Javier Baez's home run into the left-field basket put the Cubs up 1–0. Aroldis Chapman in the ninth gave up a double to Buster Posey, but earned the save as the Cubs took a 1–0 series lead.

=== Game 2 ===
October 8, 2016 7:08 pm (CDT) at Wrigley Field in Chicago, Illinois 57 °F (14 °C), clear
Team	1	2	3	4	5	6	7	8	9	R	H	E
San Francisco	0	0	2	0	0	0	0	0	0	2	6	1
Chicago	1	3	0	1	0	0	0	0	X	5	9	3
WP: Travis Wood (1–0) LP: Jeff Samardzija (0–1) Sv: Aroldis Chapman (2); Home runs: SF: None; CHC: Travis Wood (1); Attendance: 42,392; Boxscore

In Game 2, the host Cubs scored in the first inning on a Ben Zobrist single off former Cub Jeff Samardzija. Starting pitcher Kyle Hendricks had the key hit in the second inning, driving in two runs with a single up the middle. Kris Bryant drove in the Cubs' fourth run two batters later, ending Samardzija's day. In the top of the third, the Giants answered, scoring two runs on back-to-back doubles by Joe Panik and pinch-hitter Gregor Blanco and a sacrifice fly by Brandon Belt. Hendricks was hit in the arm by an Ángel Pagán line drive, forcing him to leave the game. Reliever Travis Wood ended the Giants' rally and, in the bottom half of the fourth, hit a home run to put the Cubs up 5–2. The homer was the first by a relief pitcher in a postseason game since 1924. The Cub bullpen of Carl Edwards Jr., Mike Montgomery, and Héctor Rondón shut down the Giants with Aroldis Chapman getting another save.

=== Game 3 ===
October 10, 2016 6:38 pm (PDT) at AT&T Park in San Francisco, California 58 °F (14 °C), partly cloudy
Team	1	2	3	4	5	6	7	8	9	10	11	12	13	R	H	E
Chicago	0	3	0	0	0	0	0	0	2	0	0	0	0	5	10	2
San Francisco	0	0	1	0	1	0	0	3	0	0	0	0	1	6	13	1
WP: Ty Blach (1–0) LP: Mike Montgomery (0–1); Home runs: CHC: Jake Arrieta (1), Kris Bryant (1); SF: None; Attendance: 43,571; Boxscore

The Cubs looked to sweep the series with Jake Arrieta facing the Giants' Madison Bumgarner. The host Giants were trying to extend a streak to 10–0 in their last 10 elimination games. Arrieta hit a three-run homer in the top of the second, putting the Cubs up 3–0. They threatened to chase Bumgarner in the third inning with singles by Ben Zobrist and Addison Russell, but failed to score. San Francisco scored in the third following a Denard Span double and again in the fifth after Span's triple. In the eighth, Travis Wood gave up a single and Héctor Rondón walked a batter. Closer Aroldis Chapman came in early to seek a six-out save, but gave up a two-run triple to Conor Gillaspie to give the Giants' their first lead of the series. Chapman was lifted after getting only one out. The Giants added a run on a single by Brandon Crawford. In the ninth, trailing 5–3, Dexter Fowler led off with a walk and Kris Bryant hit a two-run home run off Giants' closer Sergio Romo. Mike Montgomery took over in the ninth for the Cubs and held the Giants scoreless for four innings. In the 13th, the Giants' Crawford leadoff double was followed by a Joe Panik walk-off double to continue the series. Ty Blach earned the win for the Giants with two inning of scoreless relief.

=== Game 4 ===
October 11, 2016 5:40 pm (PDT) at AT&T Park in San Francisco, California 64 °F (18 °C), partly cloudy
Team	1	2	3	4	5	6	7	8	9	R	H	E
Chicago	0	0	1	0	1	0	0	0	4	6	6	0
San Francisco	1	0	0	2	2	0	0	0	0	5	11	2
WP: Héctor Rondón (1–0) LP: Will Smith (0–1) Sv: Aroldis Chapman (3); Home runs: CHC: David Ross (1); SF: None; Attendance: 43,166; Boxscore

With the Giants looking to continue their streak of wins in elimination games to 11, the Cubs sent John Lackey to the mound against Matt Moore. Lackey allowed a leadoff double to Denard Span and a sacrifice fly by Buster Posey to give San Francisco an early 1–0 lead. David Ross answered for Chicago in the third with a home run, becoming the oldest catcher ever to homer in a postseason game. A run-scoring to single by Moore with the bases loaded and a force-out grounder by Span in the fourth put the Giants up 3–1. The Cubs bounced back with a run in the top of the fifth on a three-base throwing error by Brandon Crawford and a sacrifice fly by Ross. Justin Grimm relieved Lackey in the bottom of the fifth and surrendered a single to Posey and double by Crawford that just missed being a home run. Travis Wood entered and gave up a single to Conor Gillaspie and sacrifice fly to Joe Panik as the Giants went up 5–2. Moore cruised through the next three innings before being lifted to start the ninth, a Game 5 appearing inevitable. However, the Giants ended up using five pitchers in the inning. Kris Bryant singled, Anthony Rizzo walked, and Ben Zobrist doubled to make it 5–3. With runners on second and third, Cubs manager Joe Maddon decided to pinch-hit for Addison Russell (and his 95 RBIs) with Chris Coghlan. Giants manager Bruce Bochy countered with lefty reliever Will Smith and Maddon switched to rookie catcher Willson Contreras instead. Contreras promptly singled up the middle to tie the game at 5. Jason Heyward's attempted sacrifice bunt was too hard and Contreras was forced out at second, but Gold Glove winner Crawford's throw to first ended up in the dugout, allowing Heyward to reach second. Javier Baez singled up the middle to complete the Cub comeback for 6–5 lead. Aroldis Chapman struck out the side in the bottom of the ninth to end the game and series. His three saves and four save opportunities tied and set Division Series records, respectively. It marked the biggest comeback in postseason-clinching history and the first time a team had come back from a three-run deficit in the 9th inning to win a postseason series clincher since the New York Mets did so in Game 6 of the 1986 National League Championship Series. This was the Giants' first postseason series defeat at home since AT&T Park opened in 2000. This was Chicago's first ever playoff win on the West Coast. The Cubs had lost 10 straight games as the visiting team on the West Coast until beating the Giants in Game 4 (they had lost three games in 1984 NLCS, three games in the 1989 NLCS, two games in the 2007 NLDS, one game in the 2008 NLDS, and Game 3 of the 2016 NLDS).

Joe Maddon stated in the off-season, after the Cubs won the World Series and broke the Curse of the Billy Goat, that Game 4 rally in the ninth of the NLDS was the most significant moment of the Cubs championship run. Maddon theorized all the pressure would have been on the Cubs having to face an experienced Giants team and Johnny Cueto in a potential winner-take-all Game 5 at Wrigley Field.

The Giants were denied the chance to win a fourth World Series title in seven years, officially ending their dynasty.

=== Composite line score ===
2016 NLDS (3–1): Chicago Cubs beat San Francisco Giants

Team	1	2	3	4	5	6	7	8	9	10	11	12	13	R	H	E
Chicago Cubs	1	6	1	1	1	0	0	1	6	0	0	0	0	17	28	5
San Francisco Giants	1	0	3	2	3	0	0	3	0	0	0	0	1	13	36	3
Total attendance: 171,277 Average attendance: 42,819

== Washington vs. Los Angeles ==
This was the second postseason meeting between the Dodgers and the Nationals franchise. Their most recent meeting was in the 1981 National League Championship Series, in which the Dodgers won the National League pennant over the then-Montreal Expos in five games.

=== Game 1 ===
October 7, 2016 5:38 pm (EDT) at Nationals Park in Washington, D.C. 72 °F (22 °C), overcast
Team	1	2	3	4	5	6	7	8	9	R	H	E
Los Angeles	1	0	3	0	0	0	0	0	0	4	8	1
Washington	0	0	2	1	0	0	0	0	0	3	9	0
WP: Clayton Kershaw (1–0) LP: Max Scherzer (0–1) Sv: Kenley Jansen (1); Home runs: LAD: Corey Seager (1), Justin Turner (1); WSH: None; Attendance: 43,915; Boxscore

Plans called for retired pitcher Liván Hernández to throw out the ceremonial first pitch, but after Hurricane Matthew′s effects on Florida made it impossible for Hernández to fly to Washington, the host team surprised the fans at Nationals Park by having Nationals starting catcher Wilson Ramos, whose season had ended with a knee injury on September 26, throw it instead. The game provided an historic first: When Dusty Baker and Los Angeles Dodgers manager Dave Roberts exchanged lineup cards before the game, it became the first postseason game in the Major League Baseball history in which two African-American managers faced one another in the postseason.

The game was billed as a marquee matchup between two of the best starting pitchers in Major League Baseball, Clayton Kershaw for the Dodgers and Max Scherzer for the Nationals, but neither was particularly sharp. With rookie catcher Pedro Severino behind the plate, Scherzer gave up a home run to the second batter, Dodgers rookie shortstop Corey Seager, on his sixth pitch of the game. In the third inning, after Dodgers second baseman Chase Utley drove in Andrew Toles with an RBI single, Scherzer gave up a two-run home run to Justin Turner, giving Los Angeles a 4–0 lead. The Dodgers did not score again; Scherzer allowed no more runs before leaving the game after six innings, and the Washington bullpen also held the visitors scoreless.

Kershaw pitched five innings and held onto the lead, but the Nationals repeatedly pushed him to the brink, while his frequent discussions on the mound with Dodgers catcher Yasmani Grandal incited boos from the crowd. In the second inning, after Daniel Murphy and Ryan Zimmerman singled and Anthony Rendon reached first on a fielder's choice, a Dodger error allowed Severino to reach safely and load the bases, but Scherzer popped out to end the inning. In the third, Rendon singled to drive in two runs as part of what promised to be a big inning, cutting the Dodgers′ lead to 4–2, but Danny Espinosa struck out to end the inning with two men on base. Severino doubled in the fourth and scored on a sacrifice fly by Trea Turner to bring Washington within 4–3, but in the fifth, with Jayson Werth and Rendon on base, Espinosa again struck out to end the inning. Although he provided his typically reliable defense, Espinosa's strikeouts left six men on base and brought three rallies to an end.

Kershaw left the game after five innings and 101 pitches, having given up three runs, all earned, on eight hits and a walk with seven strikeouts. Los Angeles's bullpen followed with four innings of shutout ball, but the Nationals had ample opportunities to tie the game. In the seventh inning, Murphy walked with one out, but then got a poor jump in an attempt to steal second and was thrown out. In the eighth, Clint Robinson doubled in the first postseason plate appearance of his career and speedy Michael A. Taylor pinch-ran, but Dodgers closer Kenley Jansen struck out pinch-hitter Chris Heisey on a called third strike to end the inning. It was the Nationals' last scoring threat; they had the tying run on base in four of the game's last five innings without being able to score a single run, and left nine men on base during the game. The Dodgers won 4–3 to take a 1–0 lead in the series.

=== Game 2 ===
October 9, 2016 1:08 pm (EDT) at Nationals Park in Washington, D.C. 64 °F (18 °C), mostly sunny
Team	1	2	3	4	5	6	7	8	9	R	H	E
Los Angeles	1	0	1	0	0	0	0	0	0	2	8	0
Washington	0	0	0	3	1	0	1	0	X	5	9	0
WP: Blake Treinen (1–0) LP: Rich Hill (0–1) Sv: Mark Melancon (1); Home runs: LAD: Corey Seager (2); WSH: José Lobatón (1); Attendance: 43,826; Boxscore

Originally scheduled to begin at 4:08 p.m. EDT on October 8, Game 2 was postponed due to rain from Hurricane Matthew and rescheduled for 1:08 p.m. EDT on October 9. Retired first baseman and former National Adam LaRoche threw out the ceremonial first pitch, tossing it to his son Drake, who spent a great deal of time with the Nationals during his father's years on the team.

Game 2 began much as Game 1 had: Washington's starting pitcher Tanner Roark, starting Game 2 because Stephen Strasburg remained sidelined with an injury, struggled; for the second game in a row, Los Angeles shortstop Corey Seager hit a first-inning home run in the Dodgers′ second at-bat of the game; and the Dodgers′ starter, Rich Hill, struck out the side in the bottom of the first, as Clayton Kershaw had in Game 1. The Nationals, meanwhile, again missed a chance at a big inning when reserve catcher José Lobatón, starting in the postseason due to the unavailability of the injured Wilson Ramos, hit into a double play with the bases loaded to end the second inning.

The Dodgers added another run in the third inning on an RBI single by right fielder Josh Reddick; Bryce Harper made a good throw to the plate from right field, but Lobatón was unable to tag Dodgers third baseman Justin Turner out at home. Dodgers starter Rich Hill used his curveball very effectively for 3 2/3 innings, and Los Angeles held a 2–0 lead in the bottom of the third when Lobatón came to bat again with two outs and Daniel Murphy and Danny Espinosa on base. Lobatón hit only the second postseason home run of his career, (Note: José Lobatón′s only previous postseason home run had been a walk-off homer for the Tampa Bay Rays in 2013.) and only the second postseason homer by a catcher in the history of the Montreal-Washington franchise, (Note: The only previous postseason home run by a catcher for the Montreal-Washington franchise was by Gary Carter for the Montreal Expos in 1981) driving in Murphy and Espinosa to give the Nationals a 3–2 lead, the first time they had taken the lead in the series.

Although Roark had an uncharacteristically unsteady outing, the Dodgers were 0-for-6 with runners in scoring position during the first five innings even though they had the bases loaded with one out three times, at least in part thanks to good Nationals defensive plays, notably by left fielder Jayson Werth. A tiring Roark left the game in the fifth inning, after 4 1/3 innings pitched and 85 pitches, with two Dodgers on base and Washington still holding a 3–2 lead. After that, Washington's bullpen, a postseason weakness for the 2012 and 2014 teams, held the Dodgers scoreless; Marc Rzepczynski, Sammy Solis, Blake Treinen, Óliver Pérez, and Mark Melancon combined to give up only three walks (all by Rzepczynski) and one hit (a single yielded by Melancon) in the game's remaining 4 2/3 innings, striking out five Dodgers. The Dodgers were 1-for-9 with runners in scoring position during the game, and by the end of the game, the Nationals′ bullpen had pitched 7 2/3 innings in the series without giving up a run. Meanwhile, Murphy, who went 3-for-3 and scored a run, pushing his offensive output for the series′ first two games to 4-for-6 with two walks, drove in runs with singles in the fifth and seventh innings as Nationals fans in the crowd chanted ""MVP! MVP!" The Nationals went 4-for-8 with runners in scoring position, a turnaround from their previous postseason performance: From Game 5 of the 2012 National League Division Series until Lobatón's homer in the third inning, they had gone only 3-for-35 in the postseason with runners in scoring position.

Washington won 5–2 to even the series at one. It was the Nationals′ first postseason victory at home since a 2–1 win over the St. Louis Cardinals in Game 4 of the 2012 National League Division Series on October 11, 2012.

=== Game 3 ===
October 10, 2016 1:08 pm (PDT) at Dodger Stadium in Los Angeles, California 74 °F (23 °C), partly cloudy
Team	1	2	3	4	5	6	7	8	9	R	H	E
Washington	0	0	4	0	0	0	0	0	4	8	9	0
Los Angeles	1	0	0	0	2	0	0	0	0	3	6	1
WP: Sammy Solis (1–0) LP: Kenta Maeda (0–1); Home runs: WSH: Anthony Rendon (1), Jayson Werth (1); LAD: Carlos Ruiz (1); Attendance: 53,901; Boxscore

As the series crossed the country to Los Angeles, the visiting Nationals put pressure on Dodgers starter Kenta Maeda from the outset, loading the bases in the first inning on a single and two walks; although they did not score, they forced him to throw 28 pitches. In the Dodgers′ half of the first, Nationals starter Gio González walked Justin Turner, followed by Corey Seager staking L.A. to a 1–0 lead in the first inning, as he had in both previous games of the series, this time with a double.

The Nationals' offense erupted in the third inning. Trea Turner singled and scored as Jayson Werth doubled. Bryce Harper then singled, scoring Werth to give the Nats a 2–1 lead, and Anthony Rendon followed with a 432-foot (132-meter), two-run home run into the left-field seats, putting Washington ahead 4–1. Maeda left the game after the inning, having thrown 68 pitches.

After the Dodgers scored their first-inning run, Gio González retired 11 of the next 12 batters. However, in the fifth inning, he gave up a two-run homer to Dodgers pinch-hitter Carlos Ruiz that narrowed the lead to 4–3. Nationals manager Dusty Baker immediately took out González and, for the second consecutive game, Nationals relievers had to pitch the final 4 2/3 innings. Sammy Solis pitched 1 2/3 innings, followed by Óliver Pérez for a third-of-an-inning and Shawn Kelley for 1 2/3 innings, all scoreless; Kelley retired all five Dodgers, striking out three of them. The Dodgers′ bullpen also blanked the Nationals through the eighth inning, Washington clinging to a 4–3 lead going into the ninth.

Los Angeles closer Kenley Jansen came in to pitch, hoping to give the Dodgers a chance to tie or win the game in the bottom of the inning. But Jayson Werth led off with a 450-foot (137-meter) home run into the left-field stands that gave the Nationals an important insurance run. Jansen then walked second baseman Daniel Murphy, hit Harper with a pitch and, after Rendon popped out, first baseman Ryan Zimmerman doubled off the right field wall, scoring both Murphy and Harper and knocking Jansen out of the game. By the time Washington pinch-hitter Chris Heisey came to bat with a 7–3 lead, many Dodger fans were leaving the stadium; Heisey capped the inning by scoring Zimmerman with a sacrifice fly to make the score 8–3. Nationals closer Mark Melancon pitched a perfect ninth to seal the victory, completing 4 2/3 scoreless innings by the bullpen; in the series thus far, Nationals relievers had pitched 12 1/3 innings without yielding a single run, striking out 14 Dodgers.

By the end of the game, Zimmerman was hitting .455 in the series, Werth .417 and Murphy .400. The win gave the Nationals a 2–1 edge, their first lead in a postseason series since the first game of the 2012 National League Division Series.

=== Game 4 ===
October 11, 2016 2:05 pm (PDT) at Dodger Stadium in Los Angeles, California 70 °F (21 °C), mostly cloudy
Team	1	2	3	4	5	6	7	8	9	R	H	E
Washington	1	0	1	0	0	0	3	0	0	5	8	0
Los Angeles	2	0	2	0	1	0	0	1	X	6	7	0
WP: Joe Blanton (1–0) LP: Blake Treinen (1–1) Sv: Kenley Jansen (2); Home runs: WSH: None; LAD: Adrián González (1); Attendance: 49,617; Boxscore

Facing elimination, the Dodgers opted to have their ace starter Clayton Kershaw pitch again on only three days rest. In the top of the first inning, the Nationals pressed him, with Trea Turner leading off with a walk and Bryce Harper following with a single, after which Daniel Murphy drove in Turner with an RBI single to give the Nationals a run in the first inning for the first time in the series. Nationals starter Joe Ross, however, had a rough first inning himself, hitting Justin Turner with a pitch and giving up a two-run homer to Adrián González.

With a 2–1 lead, Kershaw then settled down, allowing Washington to tie the game at two in the top of the third with singles by Trea Turner and Jayson Werth and a sacrifice fly by Murphy that drove in Turner, but otherwise keeping the Nationals scoreless until the seventh inning. Ross, meanwhile, struggled. In the bottom of the third inning, he gave up a lead-off double to Kershaw; after keeping Kershaw at second and recording two outs, he allowed a single by Justin Turner that scored Kershaw, walked Adrián González and Josh Reddick to load the bases, and then hit Joc Pederson with a pitch, forcing Justin Turner home from third. Ross left the game with the Dodgers leading 4–2, having thrown 55 pitches in 2 2/3 innings, giving up four runs, all earned, on three hits and two walks, and striking out three.

The Nationals bullpen faced another long outing. They stretched their streak of scoreless innings in the series to 14 1/3, but with two outs in the bottom of the fifth inning, Reynaldo López became the first Washington reliever to give up a run in the series when Reddick singled and Pederson drove him in with an RBI double, giving Los Angeles a 5–2 lead. The Nationals′ offense, meanwhile, finally got to Kershaw, staging a comeback in the top of the seventh inning. Danny Espinosa, who had gone 0-for-10 with nine strikeouts in the series, singled for his first hit of the 2016 postseason. He was still on first with two outs when Trea Turner singled and Harper walked to load the bases, driving Kershaw out of the game after throwing 110 pitches. Dodgers reliever Pedro Baez then hit Werth with a pitch to force Espinosa home, and reliever Luis Avilán gave up a single to Murphy that scored Turner and Harper, tying the game at five, with all five Nationals runs charged to Kershaw.

Pitching the bottom of the eighth for Washington, Blake Treinen got the first two outs, but then hit Andrew Toles with a pitch and gave up a single to pinch-hitter Andre Ethier, followed by a single by Chase Utley that drove in Toles to give the Dodgers a 6–5 lead. Dodgers closer Kenley Jansen secured the Dodgers′ victory with a perfect ninth in which he struck out two Nats, and Los Angeles tied the series at two.

Daniel Murphy's 2-for-3 performance in the game pushed his postseason average for 2016 to .462, and his four RBIs set a new Montreal-Washington franchise record for RBIs by a single player in a postseason game. At the end of the game, the Nationals′ bullpen ERA for the series stood at 1.02, with only two runs given up in 17 2/3 innings of work. Washington's starters, in contrast, had pitched only 16 1/3 innings and given up 13 runs, with a 7.16 ERA for the series.

When Blake Treinen hit Andrew Toles with a pitch in the bottom of the eighth inning, it set two new Major League Baseball records: It was the first time in history that one team's pitchers hit four batters with pitches in a single postseason game, and it was also the first time that two teams had combined to hit 11 batters with pitches in the course of a single postseason series.

=== Game 5 ===
October 13, 2016 8:08 pm (EDT) at Nationals Park in Washington, D.C. 64 °F (18 °C), mostly cloudy
Team	1	2	3	4	5	6	7	8	9	R	H	E
Los Angeles	0	0	0	0	0	0	4	0	0	4	8	0
Washington	0	1	0	0	0	0	2	0	0	3	7	0
WP: Julio Urías (1–0) LP: Marc Rzepczynski (0–1) Sv: Clayton Kershaw (1); Home runs: LAD: Joc Pederson (1); WSH: Chris Heisey (1); Attendance: 43,936; Boxscore

For the fifth and final game of the series, at Nationals Park, Dodgers starter Rich Hill on short rest struggled and didn't make it out of the third inning, yet gave up just one run. Max Scherzer held Los Angeles scoreless for the first six innings. Joc Pederson hit a solo homer to lead off the seventh inning and tie the game. A two-out pinch-hit single by Carlos Ruiz off Sammy Solis put the Dodgers ahead and Justin Turner's two-run triple extended it to 4–1. A two-run homer by Washington pinch-hitter Chris Heisey off Grant Dayton in the bottom of the inning made it 4–3, with the Dodgers bringing in closer Kenley Jansen to get out of the inning. Jansen threw a career high 51 pitches, working into the ninth inning. In a rare relief appearance, Dodger ace Clayton Kershaw came into the game with one out in the ninth, two days after throwing 110 pitches in Game 4 on short rest. He induced a pop-up by Daniel Murphy and struck out Wilmer Difo swinging to end the game and series. It was Kershaw's first save in the majors; the only save he had in the minors had come in his first professional season for the 2006 Gulf Coast Dodgers, a game in which Jansen was his catcher.

At 4 hours, 32 minutes, this set a record for the longest nine-inning postseason game in Major League history. The seventh inning alone lasted an hour and six minutes, with seven pitching changes, six runs, four pinch-hitters, two pinch-runners, and a double switch. This record would be passed just two years later in Game 4 of the 2018 American League Championship Series between the Boston Red Sox and the Houston Astros, which took 4 hours and 33 minutes to complete.

The Los Angeles Dodgers are heading to Chicago.

— Kenny Albert of Fox Sports, calling the final out of NLDS Game 5.

With the win, the Dodgers advanced to the NLCS for the first time since 2013, with this being their fourth appearance in nine seasons.

Washington would avenge their lost to the Dodgers in 2019, beating them in five games on their way to their first World Series in franchise history. In the series, former Dodgers second baseman Howie Kendrick would hit the grand-slam that put Washington ahead on the road in extra-innings of Game 5.

=== Composite line score ===
2016 NLDS (3–2): Los Angeles Dodgers beat Washington Nationals.

Team	1	2	3	4	5	6	7	8	9	R	H	E
Los Angeles Dodgers	5	0	6	0	3	0	4	1	0	19	37	2
Washington Nationals	1	1	7	4	1	0	6	0	4	24	42	0
Total attendance: 235,195 Average attendance: 47,039

== See also ==
- 2016 American League Division Series
