= 2016 National League Championship Series =

Team (Wins)	Managers	Season
Chicago Cubs (4)	Joe Maddon	103–58 (.640), GA: 17 1/2
Los Angeles Dodgers (2)	Dave Roberts	91–71 (.562), GA: 4
- Dates: October 15–22
- MVP: Javier Báez and Jon Lester (Chicago)
- Umpires: Ted Barrett, Gary Cederstrom (crew chief), Eric Cooper, Ángel Hernández, Alfonso Márquez, Paul Nauert (Games 1–2) and Bill Welke (Games 3–6)

Broadcast
- Television: FS1 (English); Fox Deportes (Spanish)
- TV announcers: Joe Buck, John Smoltz, Ken Rosenthal and Tom Verducci (English); Carlos Álvarez and Duaner Sánchez (Spanish)
- Radio: ESPN (English); ESPN Deportes (Spanish)
- Radio announcers: Dan Shulman and Aaron Boone (English); Eduardo Ortega, José Francisco Rivera, and Orlando Hernández (Spanish)
- NLDS: Chicago Cubs over San Francisco Giants (3–1); Los Angeles Dodgers over Washington Nationals (3–2)

The 2016 National League Championship Series was a best-of-seven playoff in Major League Baseball’s 2016 postseason in which the overall #1 seed Chicago Cubs defeated the third-seeded Los Angeles Dodgers in six games for their first National League (NL) pennant since 1945, and the right to play in the 2016 World Series against the Cleveland Indians. As the Division Series winner with the best regular season record in the National League, the Cubs earned home-field advantage regardless of opponent. The series was the 47th in league history. FS1 televised all of the games in the United States.

The Cubs would go on to defeat the Cleveland Indians in the World Series in seven games, after overcoming a 3–1 series deficit, winning their first World Series championship in 108 years, and ending the Curse of the Billy Goat.

As of 2026, this is the last LCS won by a Chicago-based team.

== Background ==
The 2016 NLCS was the Cubs' second consecutive NLCS appearance and fifth overall. Chicago lost its first four NLCS appearances, in 1984, 1989, 2003, and most recently were swept in the 2015 National League Championship Series. This was the first time the Cubs have made back-to-back NLCS appearances. The Cubs had not won a World Series championship since 1908 or played in the World Series since 1945.

This was the Dodgers' 11th overall appearance in the NLCS. Los Angeles was in the NLCS for the first time since losing the 2013 National League Championship Series to the St. Louis Cardinals. The Dodgers split their previous ten NLCS appearances, with their most recent victory in 1988, the same year they last appeared in and won the World Series.

This was the second postseason meeting between the Cubs and the Dodgers. Their only other postseason series was the 2008 National League Division Series, in which the Dodgers swept the Cubs in three games, this postseason matchup would happen again in the 2017 NLCS, with the Dodgers winning four games to one.

The Cubs won the regular season series 4 games to 3. Chicago won three of the four games played at Wrigley Field from May 30 to June 2, while Los Angeles took two out of three games played at Dodger Stadium from August 26 to 28.

With the Cubs' and Dodgers' appearances, the winning team was guaranteed to end a pennant drought of at least 28 years. The last time an NLCS had two teams that had pennant droughts of more than 25 years was 1989, when the Giants had a 27-year drought and the Cubs a 44-year drought.

== Summary ==
Chicago won the series, 4–2.

Game	Date	Score	Location	Time	Attendance
1	October 15	Los Angeles Dodgers – 4, Chicago Cubs – 8	Wrigley Field	3:37	42,376
2	October 16	Los Angeles Dodgers – 1, Chicago Cubs – 0	Wrigley Field	2:45	42,384
3	October 18	Chicago Cubs – 0, Los Angeles Dodgers – 6	Dodger Stadium	3:18	54,269
4	October 19	Chicago Cubs – 10, Los Angeles Dodgers – 2	Dodger Stadium	3:58	54,449
5	October 20	Chicago Cubs – 8, Los Angeles Dodgers – 4	Dodger Stadium	4:16	54,449
6	October 22	Los Angeles Dodgers – 0, Chicago Cubs – 5	Wrigley Field	2:36	42,386

== Game summaries ==
=== Game 1 ===
October 15, 2016 7:08 pm (CDT) at Wrigley Field in Chicago, Illinois 71 °F (22 °C), cloudy
Team	1	2	3	4	5	6	7	8	9	R	H	E
Los Angeles	0	0	0	0	1	0	0	2	1	4	9	0
Chicago	1	2	0	0	0	0	0	5	X	8	9	0
WP: Aroldis Chapman (1–0) LP: Joe Blanton (0–1); Home runs: LAD: Andre Ethier (1); CHC: Miguel Montero (1), Dexter Fowler (1); Attendance: 42,376; Boxscore

With Clayton Kershaw needed to unexpectedly close out the 2016 National League Division Series against the Washington Nationals and Rich Hill having to start that game on three days' rest, the Dodgers turned to Kenta Maeda to open this series. Opposing him was Cubs' ace Jon Lester. Chicago got to Maeda early. Dexter Fowler singled to lead off the first and scored on Kris Bryant's double. Jason Heyward tripled to lead off the second and scored on Javier Báez's double. Baez moved to third on a wild pitch, then stole home to make it 3–0 Cubs. He became the first Cub to steal home in the postseason since 1907. Lester pitched well, allowing only one run (a pinch-hit home run by Andre Ethier in the fifth) in six innings. In the top of the eighth, the Dodgers loaded the bases with no outs on two singles and walk off Mike Montgomery and Pedro Strop. Aroldis Chapman in relief struck out Corey Seager and Yasiel Puig, but Adrián González tied the game with a two-run single to center In the bottom of the inning, Miguel Montero's pinch-hit grand slam off Joe Blanton was followed by a Dexter Fowler homer on the next pitch to put the Cubs back in front 8–3. The Dodgers got a run off Héctor Rondón in the ninth when Joc Pederson singled with one out and scored on Andrew Toles's double, but Chase Utley lined into an inning-ending double play as Game 1 marked the Cubs' first victory in a National League Championship Series since Game 4 of 2003. They had previously lost seven straight NLCS games.

=== Game 2 ===
October 16, 2016 7:08 pm (CDT) at Wrigley Field in Chicago, Illinois 69 °F (21 °C), cloudy
Team	1	2	3	4	5	6	7	8	9	R	H	E
Los Angeles	0	1	0	0	0	0	0	0	0	1	3	1
Chicago	0	0	0	0	0	0	0	0	0	0	2	0
WP: Clayton Kershaw (1–0) LP: Kyle Hendricks (0–1) Sv: Kenley Jansen (1); Home runs: LAD: Adrián González (1); CHC: None; Attendance: 42,384; Boxscore

Game 2 featured a matchup between two of the league's stingiest pitchers in 2016, in terms of earned run average. Clayton Kershaw and Kyle Hendricks were the top two in ERA in baseball, although the former didn't have enough innings to qualify. The start marked the fourth appearance in ten games for Kershaw in the 2016 playoffs. For Hendricks, this was his first appearance since being struck on the forearm by a line drive by Ángel Pagán in Game 2 of the National League Division Series.

The game lived up to the billing of a pitcher's duel. Kershaw pitched seven shutout innings and the Dodgers edged the Cubs, 1–0, to even up the series at one. There were just five hits. The only run scored in the second inning on a home run by Adrián González. Hendricks pitched 5 1/3 innings of one-run ball, while four Cub relievers allowed three baserunners over 3 2/3 innings. Kenley Jansen, whose previous outing in the NLDS was a seven-out, 51-pitch outing, got the first six-out save of his career. It was the Dodgers' first six-out save in a postseason since Jay Howell in Game 4 of the 1988 World Series. Jansen needed just 18 pitches as the Dodgers tied the series at a game apiece.

Game 2 was the Cubs' second 1–0 game of the postseason and first loss since Babe Ruth and the Boston Red Sox blanked them in the 1918 World Series opener at Comiskey Park. This was also the first time the Dodgers had won a Championship Series game on the road since Game 5 of the 1988 NLCS against the Mets.

=== Game 3 ===
October 18, 2016 5:08 pm (PDT) at Dodger Stadium in Los Angeles, California 72 °F (22 °C), sunny
Team	1	2	3	4	5	6	7	8	9	R	H	E
Chicago	0	0	0	0	0	0	0	0	0	0	4	0
Los Angeles	0	0	1	2	0	1	0	2	X	6	10	0
WP: Rich Hill (1–0) LP: Jake Arrieta (0–1); Home runs: CHC: None; LAD: Yasmani Grandal (1), Justin Turner (1); Attendance: 54,269; Boxscore

This was Jake Arrieta's first start at Dodger Stadium since his no-hitter on August 30, 2015. Opposing him was journeyman Rich Hill, a former Cub.

The Dodgers opened the scoring in the bottom of the third inning. Andrew Toles led off with a single to left, advanced to second base on a ground out by Hill, then scored with two outs on a Corey Seager single to left field. Yasmani Grandal made the score 3–0 in the fourth with a two-run homer to right field. The Dodgers tacked on another in the sixth as Justin Turner drilled a homer to center field, chasing Arrieta from the game. Hill, meanwhile, pitched six innings, limiting the Cubs to two hits and two walks with six strikeouts on 93 pitches.

Joe Blanton threw an inning in the seventh and Grant Dayton and Kenley Jansen combined to do so in the eighth. In the bottom of the eighth, against reliever Mike Montgomery, Yasiel Puig singled with one out and came around to score on a double down the left-field line by Joc Pederson, improving the Dodgers' lead to 5–0. Pederson would steal third base and score on a Grandal groundout, making it 6–0. Jansen pitched the ninth to end the game.

This was the first time the Dodgers shut out a team back-to-back in the postseason in their history. It was just the fourth time in LCS history a team posted consecutive shutout wins. It marked the first time the Cubs had been blanked in back-to-back games since May 27–28, 2014. The Cubs hitting slump continued as the 2-3-4-5 hitters went 3–27 in the two shutouts. The win gave the Dodgers a 2–1 series lead.

=== Game 4 ===
October 19, 2016 5:08 pm (PDT) at Dodger Stadium in Los Angeles, California 79 °F (26 °C), clear
Team	1	2	3	4	5	6	7	8	9	R	H	E
Chicago	0	0	0	4	1	5	0	0	0	10	13	2
Los Angeles	0	0	0	0	2	0	0	0	0	2	6	4
WP: Mike Montgomery (1–0) LP: Julio Urías (0–1); Home runs: CHC: Addison Russell (1), Anthony Rizzo (1); LAD: None; Attendance: 54,449; Boxscore

Looking to break their two-game scoring drought, the Cubs sent playoff veteran John Lackey to the mound while the Dodgers went with Julio Urías, the youngest pitcher to start a game in postseason history. The Cubs' struggles continued as Urías held them without a hit through three innings. In the bottom of the second, the Dodgers had a scoring chance denied as Adrián González was thrown out at the plate by Jason Heyward after an Andrew Toles single. Dodger manager Dave Roberts called a video review but the call stood. In the fourth, the Cubs' bats began to awaken. Ben Zobrist notched their first hit with a leadoff bunt. Javier Báez and Willson Contreras followed with singles to score Zobrist, the first Cub run in 22 innings. A Heyward groundout scored another run and left Contreras at third for Addison Russell. On a 2–0 pitch, Russell broke out of his slump with a two-run homer to put the Cubs up 4–0. Urías was lifted one batter later. In the top of the fifth, Anthony Rizzo's home run on a full count made it 5–0. Back-to-back walks to begin the bottom of the fifth forced Lackey from the game. Reliever Mike Montgomery gave up a single to load the bases before striking out Corey Seager. A single off Montgomery's glove by Justin Turner brought in two runs, and the Dodgers reduced the lead to 5–2. Montgomery retired the next two batters to end the threat. In the top of the sixth, the Cubs blew the game open. Russell singled and reached second on a throwing error. Montgomery and Dexter Fowler both singled to score Russell. Following a Kris Bryant walk, Rizzo's single scored two runs to make it 8–2. Following a single by Zobrist to load the bases, Báez hit a sacrifice fly to center fielder Joc Pederson, whose throw to home got by the catcher. Bryant and Rizzo both came home, ballooning the lead to 10–2. The Cub bullpen shut down the Dodgers and the series was tied at two games apiece.

=== Game 5 ===
October 20, 2016 5:08 pm (PDT) at Dodger Stadium in Los Angeles, California 84 °F (29 °C), mostly sunny
Team	1	2	3	4	5	6	7	8	9	R	H	E
Chicago	1	0	0	0	0	2	0	5	0	8	13	0
Los Angeles	0	0	0	1	0	0	0	1	2	4	9	1
WP: Jon Lester (1–0) LP: Joe Blanton (0–2); Home runs: CHC: Addison Russell (2); LAD: None; Attendance: 54,449; Boxscore

Game 1 starters Jon Lester and Kenta Maeda returned. Chicago started the scoring in the first inning on a single by Dexter Fowler and an RBI double by Anthony Rizzo, but the Cubs left runners on base in the first, second, fourth, and fifth innings without another run. The Dodgers tied the game in the fourth following a Howie Kendrick double and steal of third. Adrián González hit a ball to Rizzo, who could not field it cleanly, allowing Kendrick to score. Struggling with heavy traffic on the bases throughout the early innings, Dodgers manager Dave Roberts lifted Maeda in the fourth inning. In the sixth, Javier Báez continued his strong post-season by singling. Addison Russell homered to center field to break the deadlock and put the Cubs up 3–1. After stranding two more runners in the seventh, the Cubs broke the game open in the eighth. Russell reached on an error and pinch hitter Willson Contreras singled. Also pinch-hitting, Albert Almora Jr. bunted the runners over, and Fowler followed with a run-scoring infield single. An infield single by Kris Bryant scored Contreras, and a walk by Ben Zobrist loaded the bases for Baez, whose bases-clearing double put the Cubs up 8–1. The Dodgers scored a run in the bottom of the eighth off Pedro Strop on a double by Carlos Ruiz. Cubs closer Aroldis Chapman pitched the ninth. He allowed a run-scoring single by Josh Reddick and a sacrifice fly by Andrew Toles to make the score 8–4, but induced Justin Turner to ground out to end the game. The win put the Cubs on the brink of the World Series as the series moved back to Wrigley Field.

=== Game 6 ===
October 22, 2016 7:08 pm (CDT) at Wrigley Field in Chicago, Illinois 55 °F (13 °C), clear
Team	1	2	3	4	5	6	7	8	9	R	H	E
Los Angeles	0	0	0	0	0	0	0	0	0	0	2	1
Chicago	2	1	0	1	1	0	0	0	X	5	7	1
WP: Kyle Hendricks (1–1) LP: Clayton Kershaw (1–1); Home runs: LAD: None; CHC: Willson Contreras (1), Anthony Rizzo (2); Attendance: 42,386; Boxscore

Cubs pitchers Kyle Hendricks and Aroldis Chapman combined to allow only two hits and one walk, facing the minimum 27 batters, the first time this had occurred in postseason play since Don Larsen's perfect game in the 1956 World Series. The Cubs won the series four games to two and won the pennant for the first time since 1945, clinching a pennant at home for the first time since 1932. Hendricks pitched 7 1/3 shutout innings, allowing just two hits and walking none. After he allowed a single in the eighth, Chapman entered and forced a double play to end the eighth and a double play grounder by Yasiel Puig to end the game, series, and the Cubs' 71-year pennant drought.

Anthony Rizzo and Willson Contreras each hit home runs and Kris Bryant, Ben Zobrist, and Dexter Fowler each drove in a run as the Cubs jumped to a 5–0 lead in the fifth inning. Of the four Dodgers to reach first base, none reached second: Andrew Toles (single, first inning), Josh Reddick (single, eighth inning), and Carlos Ruiz (walk, ninth inning) were all retired on double plays. Reddick reached on a fielding error in the second inning but was picked off at first by Hendricks. As a result, the Cubs faced the minimum number of batters, 27, to complete a nine-inning Major League Baseball game, a rarity in a postseason contest. (Don Larsen's perfect game in the 1956 World Series was the only other occurrence.)

The Dodgers' World Series drought reached 28 years with the loss. Dodgers starter Clayton Kershaw could not repeat his Game 2 magic, giving up five runs and two home runs, being replaced in the sixth inning. Relief pitcher Kenley Jansen shut out the Cubs for three innings in the loss.

Javier Báez and Jon Lester won NLCS co-Most Valuable Player honors. Baez hit 7 for 22 in the series (.318), with five runs batted in. Lester achieved a 1.38 ERA in two starts, winning Game 5.

=== Composite line score ===
2016 NLCS (4–2): Chicago Cubs beat Los Angeles Dodgers.

Team	1	2	3	4	5	6	7	8	9	R	H	E
Chicago Cubs	4	3	0	5	2	7	0	10	0	31	48	3
Los Angeles Dodgers	0	1	1	3	3	1	0	5	3	17	39	7
Total attendance: 290,313 Average attendance: 48,386

== Aftermath ==
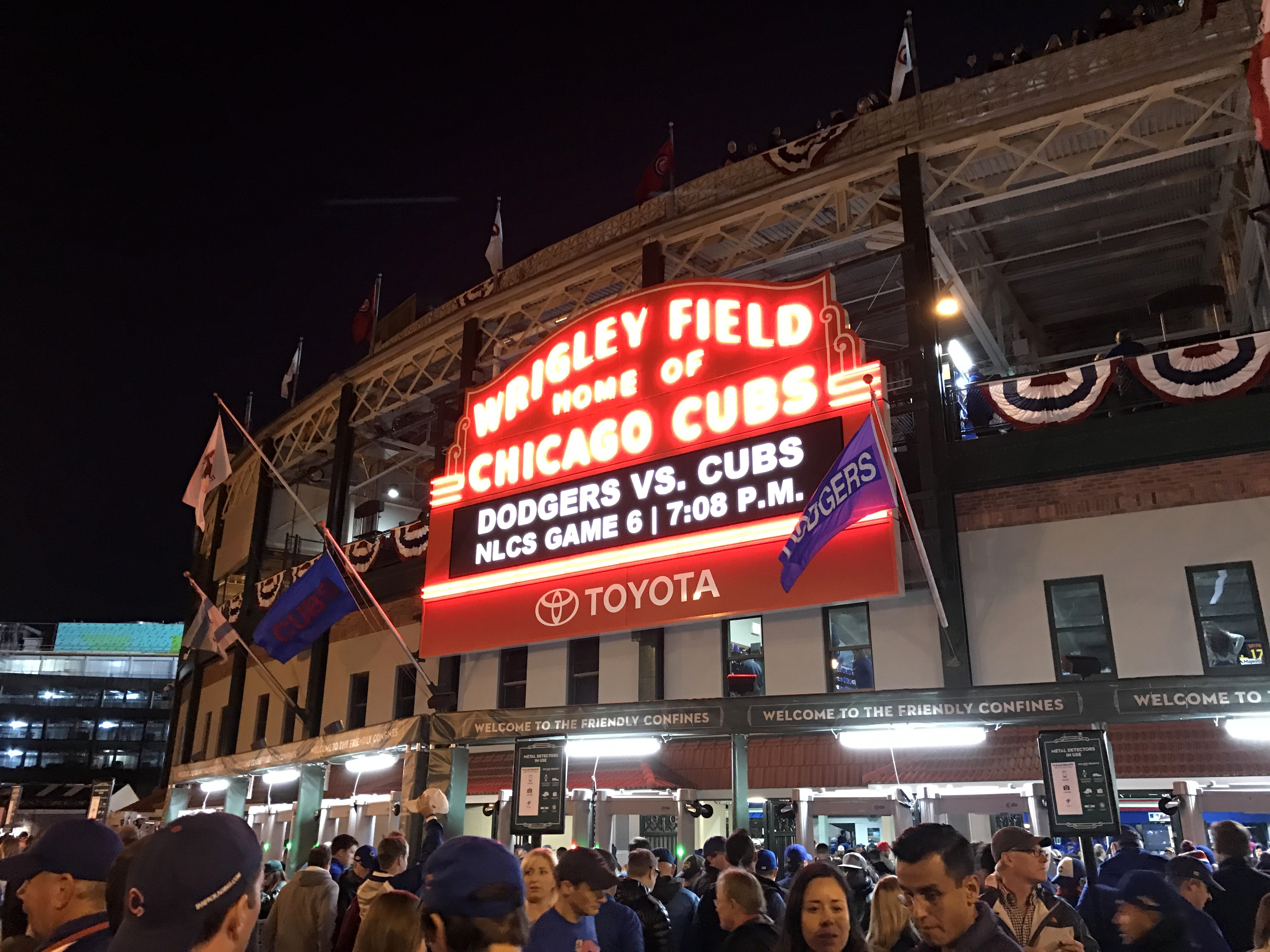
Outside Wrigley Field, minutes before NLCS Game 6

Roughly 300,000 Chicago Cubs fans took to the streets outside Wrigley Field from Saturday night into Sunday to celebrate the team's first pennant since 1945, city officials estimated. 11 days later, fans would have an even bigger celebration as the Cubs won their first World Series in 108 years, defeating the Cleveland Indians in seven games.

Both the Cubs and Dodgers would meet again in the National League Championship Series in 2017, with the roles reversed this time around. The Dodgers, bolstered by the addition of rookie of the year and MVP candidate Cody Bellinger (who replaced Adrian Gonzalez at first base), a breakout season from Chris Taylor, and a trade deadline acquisition of ace starting pitcher Yu Darvish (coincidentally, Bellinger, Darvish, and 2017 NLCS co-MVP Justin Turner would later play for the Cubs), won 104 games, the most by a National League club since the 2004 Cardinals. The Cubs, with virtually the same team as 2016 besides swamping out Aroldis Chapman for Wade Davis at closer, struggled with injury and what was dubbed by pundits as "a World Series hangover", attributable to a deep postseason run and therefore a shorter offseason; they still however managed to pull away and win the National League Central. As the 2016 NL Championship Series was a back and forth between the two clubs, the 2017 version was a lopsided affair from the beginning. The Dodgers steamrolled through the Cubs in five games, with their 20-plus run differential for the entire series being tied for the fourth largest in a postseason series.

This was the start of five NL Championship appearances for Los Angeles in six seasons, as well as seven over their next ten seasons. For Chicago, this was the middle of their three appearances in as many seasons. After the 2017 season, the Cubs would not win another playoff series until 2025, when they defeated the San Diego Padres in the Wild Card round.

== See also ==
- Curse of the Billy Goat
