= Carl Edwards Jr. =

American baseball player (born 1991)

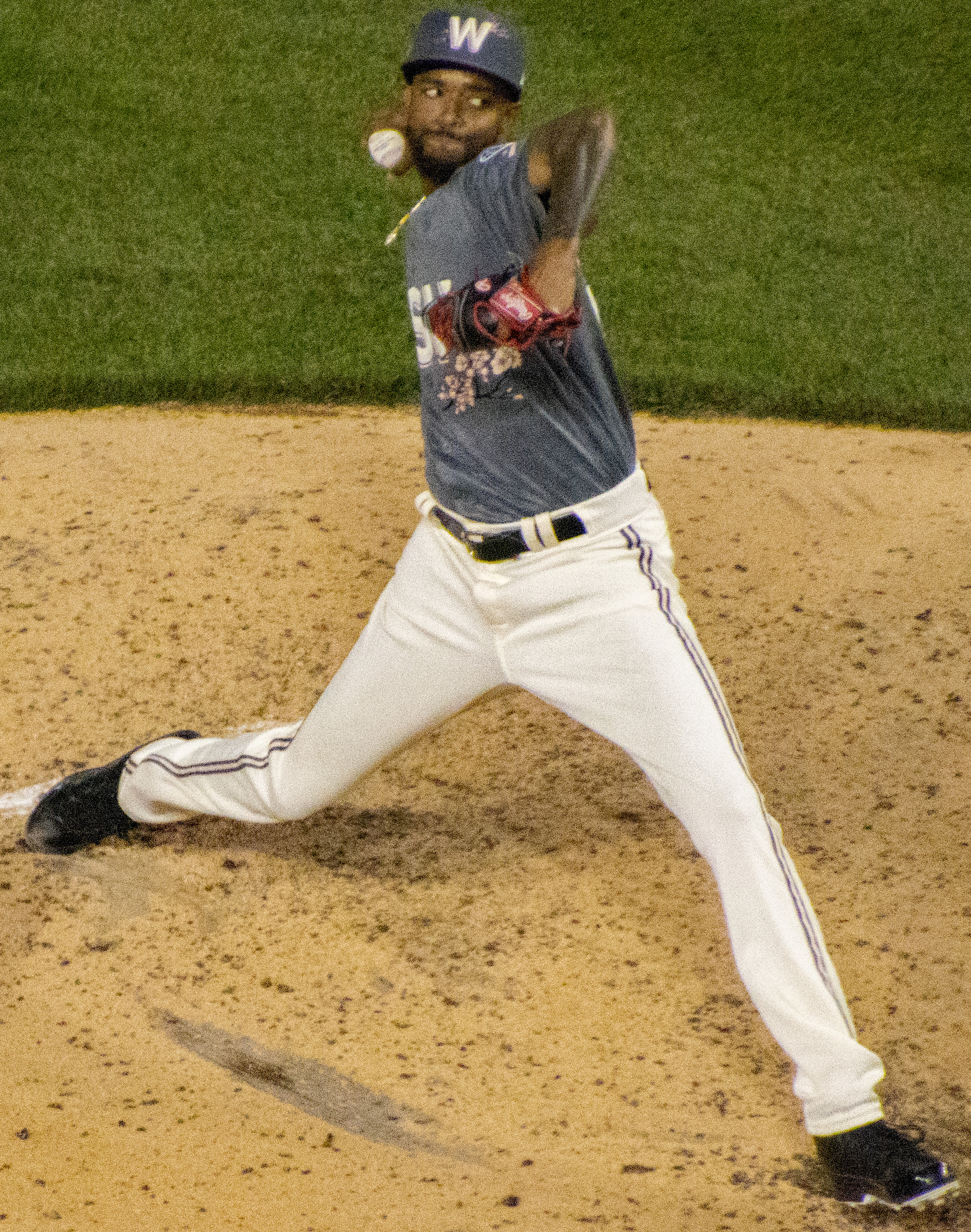
- Edwards with the Washington Nationals in 2023

Free agent
- Pitcher
- Born: September 3, 1991 (age 35); Newberry, South Carolina, U.S.
- Bats: Right Throws: Right

MLB debut
- September 7, 2015, for the Chicago Cubs

MLB statistics (through 2026 season)
- Win–loss record: 16–14
- Earned run average: 3.51
- Strikeouts: 345
- Stats at Baseball Reference

Teams
- Chicago Cubs (2015–2019); San Diego Padres (2019); Seattle Mariners (2020); Atlanta Braves (2021); Toronto Blue Jays (2021); Washington Nationals (2022–2023); San Diego Padres (2024); Los Angeles Angels (2025); Texas Rangers (2025); New York Mets (2026)

Career highlights and awards
- World Series champion (2016)

Carl Fleming Edwards Jr. (born September 3, 1991) is an American professional baseball pitcher who is a free agent. He has previously played in Major League Baseball (MLB) for the Chicago Cubs, Seattle Mariners, Atlanta Braves, Toronto Blue Jays, Washington Nationals, San Diego Padres, Los Angeles Angels, Texas Rangers, and New York Mets.

== Career ==
=== Texas Rangers ===
Edwards was drafted by the Texas Rangers in the 48th round of the 2011 Major League Baseball draft out of Mid-Carolina High School in Prosperity, South Carolina. Edwards initially committed to play college baseball for the Charleston Southern Buccaneers, where he would join a high school teammate and friend, Will Bedenbaugh. However, when Bedenbaugh died in a car accident, Edwards couldn't face the idea of playing for the team where his friend's absence would be glaring, and decided instead to pursue professional baseball. He spent his first professional season with the Arizona League Rangers and Spokane Indians. He finished the year 5–3 with a 1.48 earned run average (ERA) and 85 strikeouts over 67 innings pitched. He started the 2013 season with the Hickory Crawdads, going 8–2 with a 1.83 ERA and 122 strikeouts over 93 1/3 innings (18 starts).

=== Chicago Cubs ===
On July 22, 2013, Edwards along with Mike Olt, Justin Grimm, and a player to be named later (Neil Ramírez) were traded to the Chicago Cubs for Matt Garza. He was assigned to the High-A Daytona Cubs, where he had a 1.96 ERA and 33 strikeouts over 23 innings (six starts). After the season, he was named MiLB Pitcher of the Year.

Prior to the 2014 season, he was ranked by Baseball America as the 28th best prospect in baseball. He spent the 2014 season with the Double-A Tennessee Smokies, where he compiled a 1–2 record and 2.44 ERA over ten starts. On November 20, 2014, Edwards was added to the Cubs 40-man roster in order to protect him from the Rule 5 Draft. He began 2015 with Tennessee, and was promoted to the Triple–A Iowa Cubs in May.

==== 2015 season ====
On September 7, 2015, Edwards made his Major League debut for the Cubs against the St. Louis Cardinals at Busch Stadium. In 36 appearances out of the bullpen between both Tennessee and Iowa prior to his callup, he was 5–3 with a 2.77 ERA and 75 strikeouts over 55 1/3 innings.

==== 2016 season ====
Edwards began 2016 with Iowa. He was recalled May 11 to Chicago, but returned to Iowa the next day. He was recalled once again on June 20 and spent the rest of the season with Chicago. On September 1, Edwards recorded his first Major League save, against the San Francisco Giants. Edwards finished the 2016 season with a 3.75 ERA in 35 innings pitched.

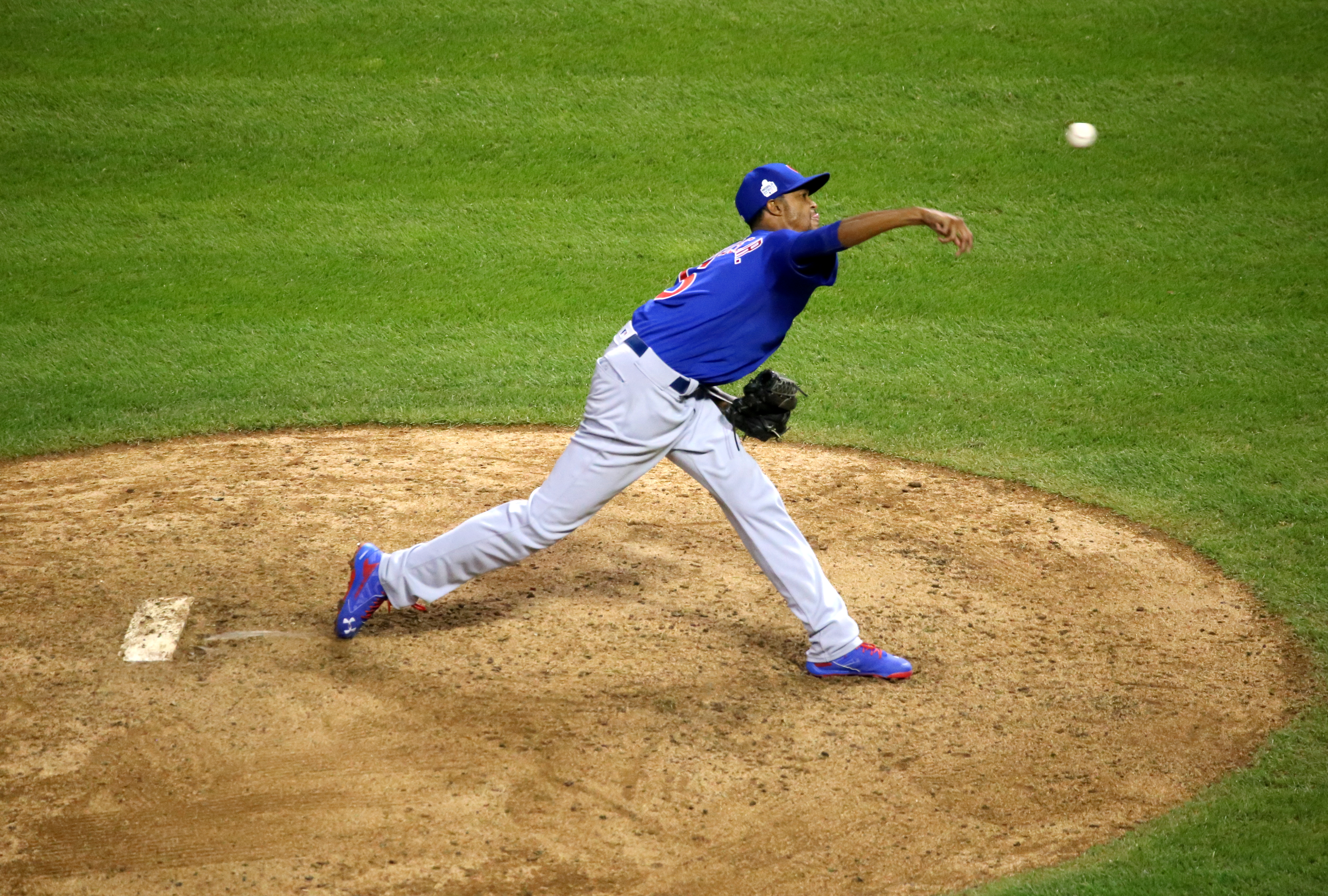
Carl Edwards Jr. delivers a pitch during the 10th inning of World Series Game 7.

On October 25, Edwards along with teammates Addison Russell, Dexter Fowler, and Jason Heyward became the first African-Americans to play for the Cubs in a World Series game. (Note: Jackie Robinson's rookie season was 1947 which was two years after the Chicago Cubs appearance in the 1945 World Series. In 1953, Ernie Banks, known as Mr. Cub, became the first African-American on the Cubs roster.) In Game 3, he struck out the side in relief duty in the top of the sixth inning against the Cleveland Indians, becoming the first African-American to pitch for the Cubs in a World Series game. Edwards appeared in the bottom of the 10th inning of Game 7, where he recorded the first two outs of the inning and surrendered one run. The Cubs went on to win their first World Series in 108 years.

==== 2017 season ====
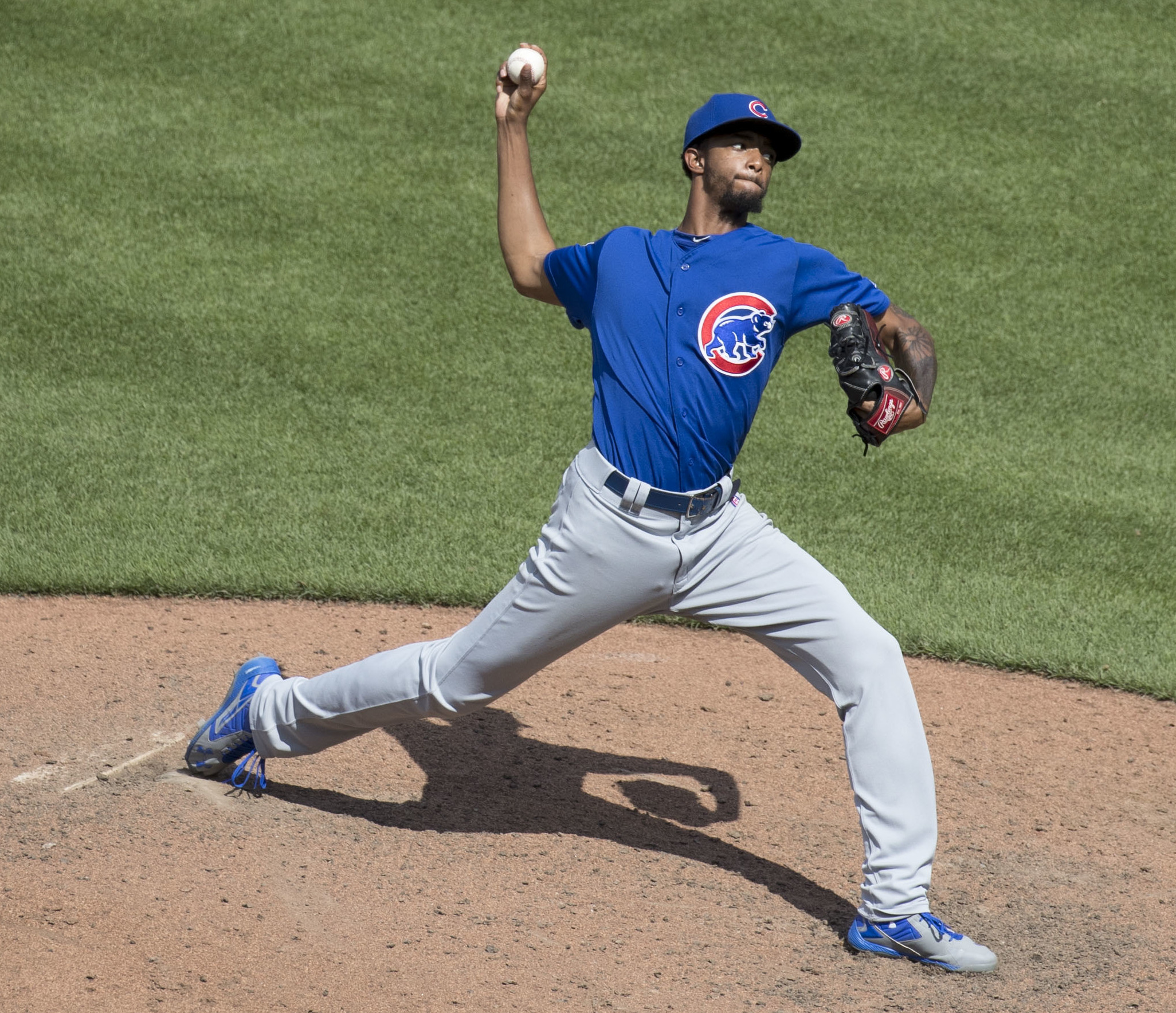
Edwards Jr. with the Chicago Cubs in 2017

2017 was Edwards' first full season in the major leagues; he was 5–4 with a 2.98 ERA and 94 strikeouts in 66 1/3 relief innings pitched.

Edwards struggled in the division series against the Washington Nationals, pitching 2 1/3 innings and allowing six runs. Notably, he allowed a game-tying two-run home run to Bryce Harper in the eighth inning of Game 2. Edwards' performance improved during the league championship series against the Los Angeles Dodgers, again pitching 2 1/3 innings, but this time allowing no runs.

==== 2018 season ====
In 2018, Edwards posted a 3–2 record and recorded 67 strikeouts and a 2.60 ERA in 52 innings.

==== 2019 season ====
Edwards suffered from various injuries in 2019, and struggled from the start of the year. He pitched in four games between March 30 and April 5, recording only five outs. He allowed three hits (two home runs), five walks, and six runs. He was optioned to the Iowa Cubs on April 6 to work through his mechanics. The Cubs recalled Edwards on May 6.

=== San Diego Padres ===
On July 31, 2019, Edwards was traded to the San Diego Padres in exchange for Brad Wieck. Edwards struggled greatly in San Diego, posting a 32.40 ERA in 2 games for the team. On November 4, 2019, he cleared waivers and elected free agency.

=== Seattle Mariners ===
On December 4, 2019, Edwards signed a one-year contract with the Seattle Mariners. In 2020, he allowed 1 run over 5 games, striking out 6. On October 22, 2020, Edwards elected free agency after being outrighted off of the 40-man roster.

=== Atlanta Braves ===
On January 29, 2021, Edwards signed a minor league contract with the Atlanta Braves organization. On March 25, 2021, he opted out of his contract and became a free agent. On April 5, 2021, Edwards re-signed with the Braves on a new minor league contract. On May 7, 2021, Edwards was selected to the active roster. He allowed 3 runs on 3 hits and a walk before being designated for assignment the next day. On May 10, Edwards elected free agency.

=== Toronto Blue Jays ===
On May 14, 2021, Edwards signed a minor league contract with the Toronto Blue Jays organization and was assigned to the Triple-A Buffalo Bisons. On May 30, Edwards was selected to the active roster. On June 17, he was placed on the 60-day injured list with a left oblique strain. He was released by the organization on August 29, 2021.

=== Chicago White Sox ===
On August 31, 2021, Edwards signed a minor league contract with the Chicago White Sox and was assigned to the Triple-A Charlotte Knights. In 10 appearances for Charlotte, he recorded a 2.00 ERA with 15 strikeouts and three saves over nine innings of work. Edwards elected free agency following the season on November 7.

=== Washington Nationals ===
On February 25, 2022, Edwards signed a minor league contract with the Washington Nationals. For the 2022 season, Edwards added a change-up to his arsenal. Dominant with the Triple-A Rochester Red Wings, Edwards earned a call-up to the majors, which happened on May 10.

On January 13, 2023, Edwards agreed to a one-year, $2.25 million contract with the Nationals, avoiding salary arbitration. After posting a 3.69 ERA in 32 relief appearances, Edwards was placed on the injured list with right shoulder inflammation on June 21. He began a rehab assignment with the rookie–level Florida Complex League Nationals on August 15. On August 23, Edwards was shut down indefinitely after suffering a stress fracture in his right scapula; he was transferred to the 60–day injured list on August 28. He became a free agent following the season.

=== Chicago Cubs (second stint) ===
On January 26, 2024, Edwards signed a minor league contract with the Chicago Cubs. He opted out of his deal with the Cubs and became a free agent on March 23 and later re-signed with them on April 6 to a new minor league deal. In 20 appearances for the Triple–A Iowa Cubs, he compiled a 1.85 ERA with 22 strikeouts and 7 saves across 24 1/3 innings pitched. Edwards was released by the Cubs organization on June 16.

=== San Diego Padres (second stint) ===
On July 4, 2024, Edwards signed a minor league contract with the San Diego Padres. Upon joining the organization, he began working primarily as a starting pitcher. On August 8, the Padres selected Edwards' contract, adding him to their active roster. He made one appearance for the Padres, issuing two walks and allowing one hit while recording no outs. Edwards was designated for assignment by San Diego on August 12. He cleared waivers and was sent outright to the Triple–A El Paso Chihuahuas on August 14, but rejected the assignment in favor of free agency. Edwards re-signed with the Padres on a new minor league contract on August 19. He elected free agency following the season on November 4.

=== Los Angeles Angels ===
On March 11, 2025, Edwards signed with the Tigres de Quintana Roo of the Mexican League. However prior to the start of the season on March 21, he signed a minor league contract with the Los Angeles Angels. After seven appearances for the Triple-A Salt Lake Bees, the Angels selected Edwards' contract, adding him to their active roster. In two games for the Angels, he allowed three runs on four hits with two strikeouts over three innings pitched. Edwards was designated for assignment by the team on April 26. He cleared waivers and was sent outright to Salt Lake on April 28. However, Edwards rejected the assignment and elected free agency on April 30.

=== Tigres de Quintana Roo ===
On May 5, 2025, Edwards signed with the Tigres de Quintana Roo of the Mexican League. In 14 starts for Quintana Roo, Edwards compiled a 5-2 record and 3.38 ERA with 60 strikeouts across 74 2/3 innings pitched.

=== Texas Rangers (second stint) ===
On July 22, 2025, Edwards signed a minor league contract with the Texas Rangers organization. In eight appearances (seven starts) for the Triple-A Round Rock Express, he posted a 2-1 record and 5.31 ERA with 44 strikeouts over 39 innings of work. On September 7, the Rangers selected Edwards' contract, adding him to their active roster. He made two scoreless appearances for Texas, recording four strikeouts across three innings pitched. Edwards was designated for assignment by the Rangers on September 19; he cleared waivers and was sent outright to Round Rock on September 23. He elected free agency on October 6.

=== New York Mets ===
On December 8, 2025, Edwards signed a minor league contract with the New York Mets. He was assigned to the Triple-A Syracuse Mets to begin the regular season, where he posted a 1–2 record and 5.29 ERA with 13 strikeouts over four starts. On April 24, 2026, the Mets selected Edwards' contract, adding him to their active roster. He made two appearances for New York, recording a 1.50 ERA with 11 strikeouts across six innings pitched. On April 30, Edwards was designated for assignment by the Mets. He cleared waivers and elected free agency on May 3.

=== Detroit Tigers ===
On May 8, 2026, Edwards signed a minor league contract with the Detroit Tigers and was assigned to the Triple-A Toledo Mud Hens. In 20 games (11 starts) with Triple-A Toledo Mud Hens he threw 78 innings going 7-8 with a 5.42 ERA and 94 strikeouts. He elected free agency on November 2.

== Personal life ==
Edwards and his fiancée, Anquinette Smith, welcomed their first child in August 2015, and their second in July 2018. Edwards and Anquinette married in 2021.

Edwards was sometimes known as "C.J." (for Carl Jr.) in the minor leagues, a name which Joe Maddon continued to use while the two were with the Cubs. Edwards also earned the nickname "The String Bean Slinger" for his strong arm combined with his skinny physique (6' 3", 170 lbs), which he has adopted for the back of his personalized jersey during the annual Players Weekend.
