= Addison Russell =

American baseball player (born 1994)

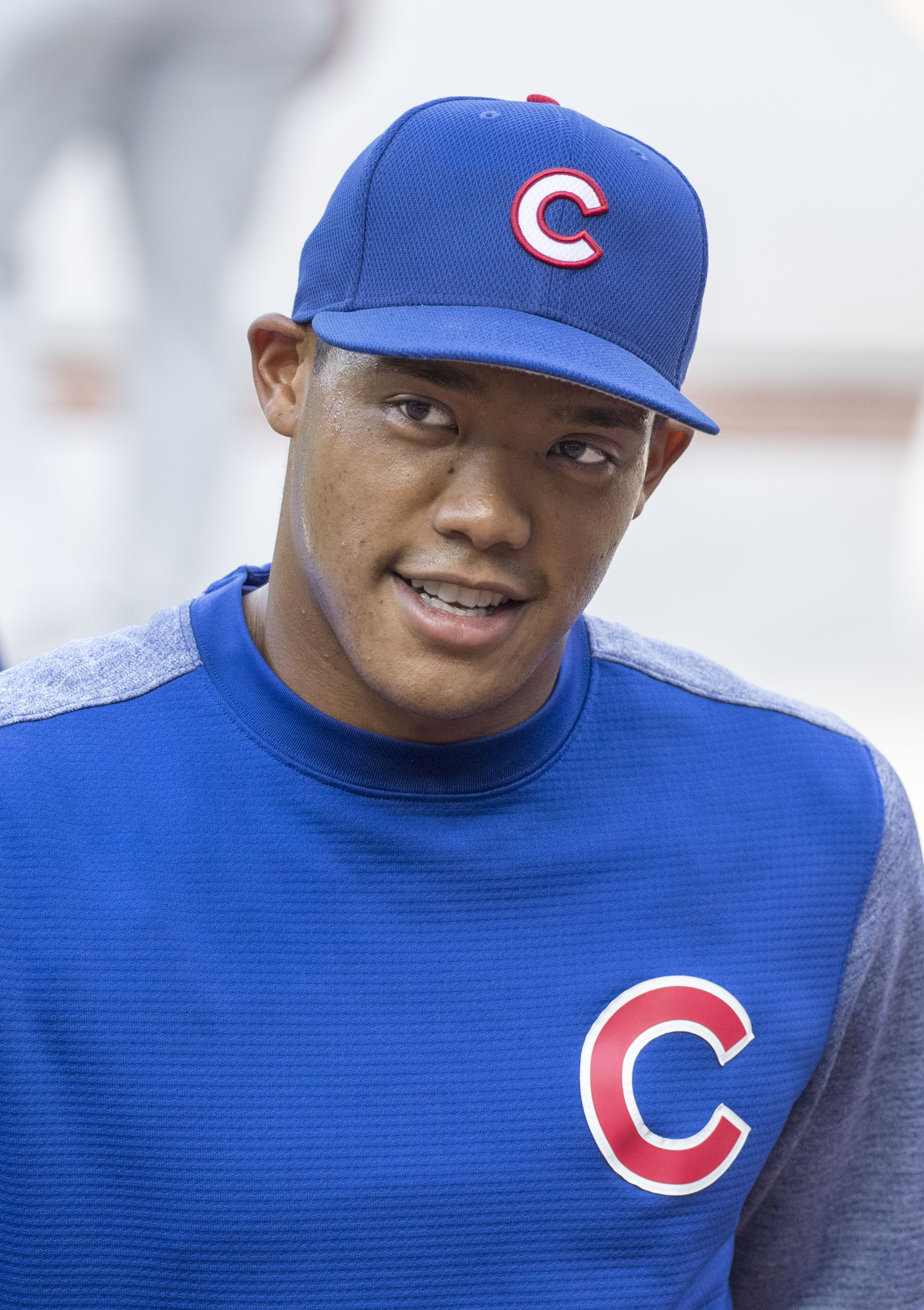
- Russell with the Chicago Cubs in 2017

Leones de Yucatán – No. 27
- Second baseman / Shortstop
- Born: January 23, 1994 (age 32); Pensacola, Florida, U.S.
- Bats: Right Throws: Right

Professional debut
- MLB: April 21, 2015, for the Chicago Cubs
- KBO: July 28, 2020, for the Kiwoom Heroes

MLB statistics (through 2019 season)
- Batting average: .242
- Home runs: 60
- Runs batted in: 253

KBO statistics (through 2023 season)
- Batting average: .269
- Home runs: 6
- Runs batted in: 73
- Stats at Baseball Reference

Teams
- Chicago Cubs (2015–2019); Kiwoom Heroes (2020, 2023)

Career highlights and awards
- All-Star (2016); World Series champion (2016)

Addison Wayne Russell (born January 23, 1994) is an American professional baseball shortstop for the Leones de Yucatán of the Mexican League. Russell was drafted 11th overall by the Oakland Athletics in the 2012 Major League Baseball draft. He was traded to the Chicago Cubs in 2014. In 2015, Baseball America listed Russell as the third-best prospect in professional baseball. He made his MLB debut with the Cubs in April 2015 and was an All-Star in 2016. That same year, Russell won the World Series with the Cubs. He has previously played in the KBO League for the Kiwoom Heroes.

== Early life ==
Russell was born on January 23, 1994, in Pensacola, Florida, the eldest of four children raised by mother Milany Ocampo-Russell and stepfather Wayne Russell. Russell's mother is Filipina. The full name on Russell's birth certificate is Geoffreye O'Neal Addison Robert Watts Jr III. He was nearly killed by human respiratory syncytial virus at three months old. He was adopted by his stepfather, Wayne, at 13 years old and took the name Addison Wayne Russell.

== Amateur career ==
=== High school ===
Russell attended Pace High School in Florida and in 2010 led his high school to a class 5A FHSAA baseball state championship and a runner-up finish in 2012. Russell played in the 2010 Under Armour All-America Baseball Game, was named a Perfect Game Aflac All-American Game participant and a Louisville Slugger First Team All-American in 2011. He was also ranked as the No. 18 high school prospect by Baseball America and as the No. 24 high school prospect by Perfect Game. In his final high school baseball season, Russell hit for a .368 batting average and recorded a .532 on base percentage. Russell also played high school football at the running back position.

In November 2011, Russell signed a National Letter of Intent to play college baseball at Auburn University for the Tigers baseball team.

=== International ===
Russell was a member of the USA Baseball 18U National Team at the 2011 COPABE 18U/AAA Pan American games that won a gold medal. At the tournament, Russell batted .393, going 11-for-28 with three doubles, a triple and a home run, driving in nine RBIs and scoring 11 runs. During the championship game against Team Canada, Russell hit a grand slam and was named First-Team All Tournament as Shortstop for his efforts. At the tournament for Team USA, Russell played alongside future professional baseball players Albert Almora, Alex Bregman, David Dahl, Joey Gallo, and Carson Kelly.

== Professional career ==
=== Oakland Athletics ===
Russell was drafted by the Oakland Athletics with the 11th overall pick of the first round in the 2012 Major League Baseball draft out of Pace High School in Pace, Florida. Russell received a $2.625 million signing bonus for signing with the A's instead of attending Auburn. He was also the first high school athlete selected by the A's in the first round of the draft since Jeremy Bonderman in 2001.

Russell started his career with the Arizona League Athletics, where he hit .415/.488/.717 with six home runs and 29 runs batted in in 26 games. He was then promoted to the Vermont Lake Monsters and hit .340/.386/.509 with one home run in 13 games. He finished the season with the Class-A Burlington Bees, hitting .310/.369/.448 in 16 games. Overall, he finished his first season hitting .369/.432/.594 with seven home runs and 45 runs batted in 55 games. In 2012, he was named an Oakland MILB.com organization All-Star and an AZL post-season All-Star.

Prior to the 2013 season, Russell was the Athletics' best prospect according to Baseball America. He was also named the best prospect in the Arizona League. In 2013, he was named an Oakland MILB.com organization All-Star, a California League (CAL) rookie of the year, a CAL post-season All-Star, and a CAL Futures Game selection. Playing for Mesa, he was also named to the AFL All-Prospect Team, and an AFL Rising Star.

=== Chicago Cubs ===
On July 4, 2014, Russell, along with pitcher Dan Straily, outfielder Billy McKinney, and a player to be named later, was traded to the Chicago Cubs in exchange for pitcher Jason Hammel and pitcher Jeff Samardzija. The Cubs sent Russell to the Arizona Fall League for the second time at the end of the 2014 minor league season.

==== 2015 ====
Baseball America named him the #3 prospect before the 2015 season. On April 21, Russell was called up to the 25-man roster to play second base against the Pittsburgh Pirates at PNC Park. On May 1, Russell hit his first career home run off of Wily Peralta in a 1–0 victory over the Milwaukee Brewers. He moved to his normal infield position at shortstop in early August, replacing three-time All-Star Starlin Castro. Russell committed only two errors in 52 games as the regular Cubs shortstop.

In the 2015 postseason, he had 3 hits in 12 at bats with 1 RBI. Cardinals pitcher John Lackey had a no-hitter into the sixth. Russell's single was the first hit. He hit a triple in the late innings of the third NLDS game and was slightly injured sliding into third. He did not play in Game 4. After the Cubs defeated the Cardinals in the NLDS to advance to the NLCS to face the New York Mets, it was announced that Russell had pulled his hamstring. This injury kept him out of the NLCS.

After the season, the Cubs acquired Jason Heyward. Russell gave up his jersey number, 22, to Heyward, and switched to number 27 in honor of Eddie George.

==== 2016 ====
Batting .242 with 11 home runs and 48 RBIs, Russell was the starting shortstop at the 2016 Major League Baseball All-Star Game. By the beginning of September of the 2016 season, Russell had 108 hits in 445 at bats with 19 home runs and 88 runs batted in. Russell had a bases-loaded game-winning hit in a late-season game against the San Francisco Giants. He was 9-for-23 (.391) with 24 RBIs in bases-loaded situations for the year; the 9 bases-loaded hits led MLB for the season. In the seventh inning of a different game, in a bases loaded situation, Russell made an acrobatic catch at the left field foul line for the final out of the inning. Russell finished the year with 95 RBIs and became the second Cub shortstop with over 90 for a season. Previously, Hall of Famer Ernie Banks accomplished this feat five times. Russell hit decisive two-run home runs in Games 4 and 5 of that year's National League Championship Series, helping the Cubs break the Curse of the Billy Goat en route to their first World Series win in 108 years.

On October 25, 2016, Addison Russell along with teammates Dexter Fowler, Jason Heyward, and Carl Edwards Jr., became the first African-Americans to play for the Cubs in a World Series game. Both Russell and Fowler are the first African-Americans to start for the Cubs in a World Series due to it being the first World Series the Cubs have played in since desegregation. (Note: Jackie Robinson's rookie season was 1947 which was two years after the Chicago Cubs appearance in the 1945 World Series. In 1953, Ernie Banks, known as Mr. Cub, became the first African-American on the Cubs roster.) Russell hit the 19th grand slam in the history of the World Series in the sixth game and also tied an MLB record of 6 RBI by one player in a game on a team facing elimination from the fall classic. He became the first player to hit a grand slam in a World Series game since Paul Konerko of the Chicago White Sox in the 2005 World Series.

==== 2017 ====
On April 19, 2017, Russell hit his first career walk-off home run, a three-run shot against the Milwaukee Brewers. On August 4, Russell was placed on the 10-day disabled list due to a strained right foot. At that point in the season his batting average was .241 with 10 home runs and 36 RBI's.

On September 16, 2017, Russell returned from a long stint on the disabled list, and homered in his first at-bat.

==== 2018 ====
Russell had a disappointing season (.250 BA, 5 HR, 38 RBI), and he did not play again after September 19 due to MLB placing him on administrative leave as it investigated abuse allegations made against him by his ex-wife.

==== 2019 ====
Russell was suspended for the first 29 games of the season, finishing the 40-game suspension he received in 2018 as a result of allegations, found credible by MLB, that he abused his wife. Once his suspension was served, he reported to the Iowa Cubs. He was recalled to Chicago on May 8. Immediately, he switched from shortstop to second base. That night he went 0-for-3 with a walk against the Miami Marlins. The Wrigley Field crowd greeted Russell with mostly boos. Russell hit his first home run of the 2019 season on May 15 against the Cincinnati Reds. The Cubs optioned Russell to AAA on July 24, 2019, to make room for catcher Willson Contreras. On December 2, 2019, Russell was non-tendered and became a free agent.

=== Kiwoom Heroes ===
On June 19, 2020, Russell signed with the Kiwoom Heroes of KBO League. On July 28, 2020, Russell made his debut in KBO in a 6–2 win against the Doosan Bears with two RBIs and a run. At the end of the season, his batting average was .254 with 2 home runs and 31 RBIs. On November 27, the Heroes announced that they would not bring back Russell for the 2021 season, and he became a free agent.

=== Acereros de Monclova ===
On April 1, 2021, Russell signed with the Acereros de Monclova of the Mexican League. In 66 games for Monclova, he batted .319/.405/.494 with 8 home runs and 47 RBI.

In 2022, Russell played in 80 games for Monclova, hitting .348/.443/.677 with 24 home runs, 74 RBI, and 8 stolen bases.

=== Kiwoom Heroes (second stint) ===
On December 11, 2022, Russell signed with the Kiwoom Heroes of the KBO League. He played in 59 games for Kiwoom in 2023, hitting .286/.339/.400 with 4 home runs and 42 RBI. On July 13, 2023, Russell was released by the team after being hampered by a wrist injury since mid–June.

=== Acereros de Monclova (second stint) ===
On February 16, 2024, Russell signed with the Acereros de Monclova of the Mexican League. In 82 appearances for Monclova, he batted .319/.405/.446 with seven home runs, 51 RBI, and six stolen bases.

Russell made 61 appearances for the Acereros during the 2025 campaign, batting .304/.378/.424 with seven home runs, 31 RBI, and two stolen bases.

=== Piratas de Campeche ===
On February 13, 2026, Russell was loaned to the Piratas de Campeche of the Mexican League. In 19 appearances for the Piratas, Russell slashed .324/.367/.432 with two home runs and nine RBI.

=== Leones de Yucatán ===
On May 19, 2026, Russell was re-called by the Acereros de Monclova, and subsequently loaned out to the Leones de Yucatán of the Mexican League.

== Personal life ==
Russell has a daughter who was born in May 2015; her mother is Mallory Engstrom. Russell and Melisa Reidy married in January 2016 in Milton, FL at Sowell Farms; they have a son who was born in August 2015. Russell's third child, a son, was born in October 2018 to girlfriend Asti Kelley.

In June 2017, Russell was accused, by an unknown party, of domestic violence against Reidy, an incident which led to Reidy filing for divorce. Two weeks after this initial allegation, Reidy's lawyer said that she would not be cooperating with MLB's investigation and that she "isn't interested in legitimizing anything that doesn't come from her". Ultimately, Reidy did meet with MLB once she felt strong enough to do so. MLB suspended Russell for 40 games as a result of its investigation. Russell did not appeal the suspension.
