= Andrew Toles =

American baseball player (born 1992)

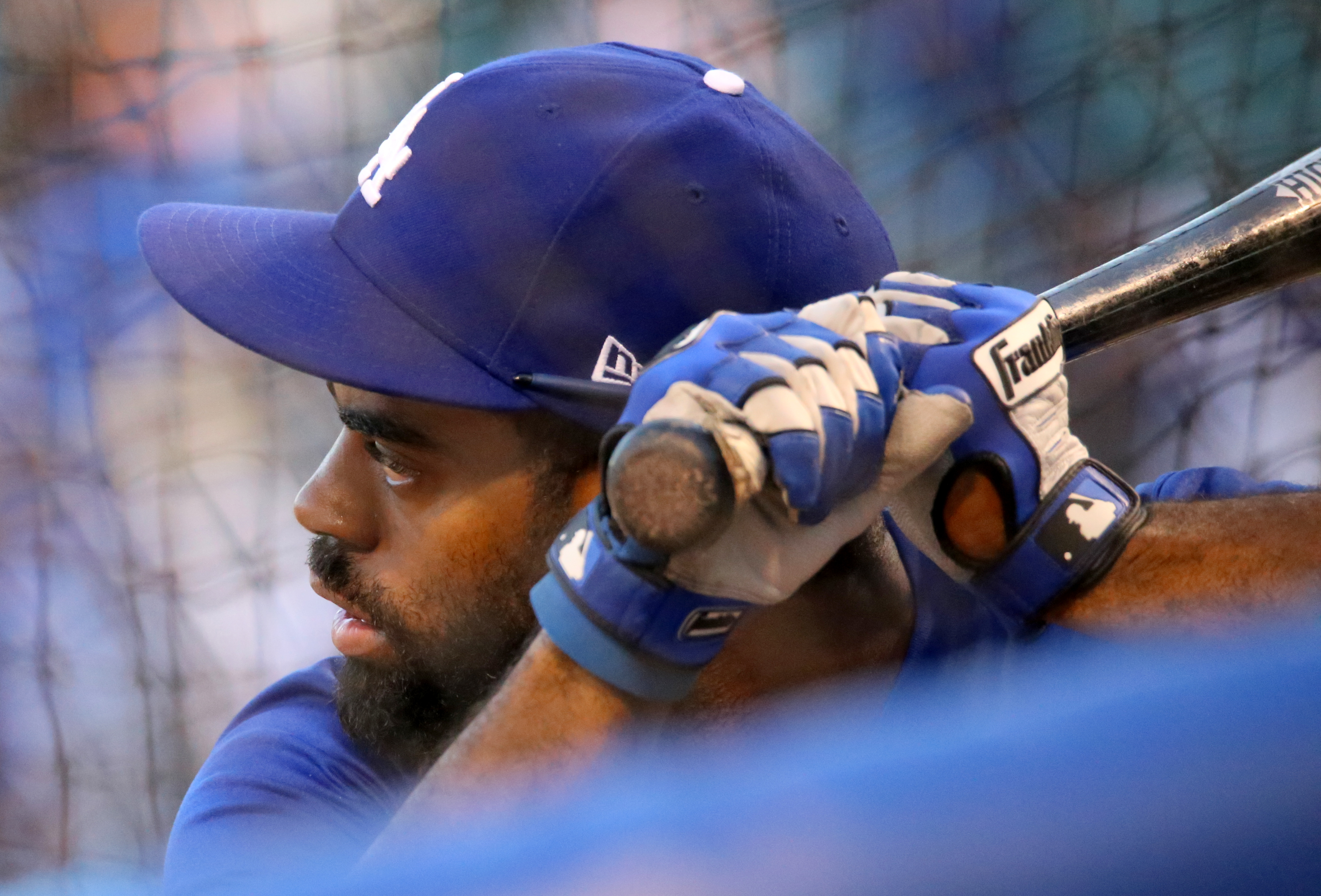
- Toles taking batting practice in 2016
- Outfielder
- Born: May 24, 1992 (age 33); Decatur, Georgia, U.S.
- Batted: Left Threw: Right

MLB debut
- July 8, 2016, for the Los Angeles Dodgers

Last MLB appearance
- September 30, 2018, for the Los Angeles Dodgers

MLB statistics
- Batting average: .286
- Home runs: 8
- Runs batted in: 35
- Stats at Baseball Reference

Teams
- Los Angeles Dodgers (2016–2018)

Alvin Andrew Toles (born May 24, 1992) is an American former professional baseball outfielder who played in Major League Baseball (MLB) for the Los Angeles Dodgers from 2016 to 2018 before his career was derailed by mental health issues.

Toles played college baseball for the University of Tennessee and Chipola College. He was selected by the Tampa Bay Rays in the third round of the 2012 Major League Baseball draft and played for their organization until 2015. He signed with the Dodgers after the 2015 season and made his major league debut in 2016. He remained on the club's restricted list through 2025, despite not being available to play after 2018.

== Amateur career ==
Toles attended Sandy Creek High School in Tyrone, Georgia. After he graduated, the Florida Marlins selected him in the fourth round of the 2010 Major League Baseball draft. He chose not to sign with the Marlins.

Toles enrolled at the University of Tennessee to play college baseball for the Tennessee Volunteers. He was named to the SEC All-Freshman team in 2011. However, he was dismissed by the Volunteers baseball team later that year. Tennessee coach Dave Serrano did not specify a reason for Toles' dismissal but noted "a certain standard of accountability to which every member of the team must be held." After the 2011 season, he played collegiate summer baseball with the Brewster Whitecaps of the Cape Cod Baseball League, and was named a league all-star.

Toles then transferred to Chipola College in northern Florida. He was suspended from Chipola's baseball team in 2012, for breaking team rules.

== Professional career ==
=== Tampa Bay Rays ===
The Tampa Bay Rays selected Toles in the third round of the 2012 Major League Baseball draft. He signed, receiving a $369,700 signing bonus. After his first professional season, with the Princeton Rays of the Rookie-level Appalachian League in 2012 in which he batted .281, Baseball America named Toles the Best Athlete and the Fastest Baserunner in the organization. In 2013, playing for the Bowling Green Hot Rods of the Class A Midwest League, Toles led the league in batting average and hits and was named a Mid- and Post-Season All-Star, a Topps Class-A All-Star, a MiLB.com Organization All-Star, and the Rays' Minor League Player of the Year.

In 2014, playing for two months with the Charlotte Stone Crabs of the Class A-Advanced Florida State League, Toles was criticized by manager Jared Sandberg. He was admonished first for not running hard to first, and was then pulled from a game for not hustling. His manager said: "If you don’t play hard, you don’t play.... I watched Andrew play last year, and he came out of the game last year, too. So this isn’t the first time." Toles left the team days later, and was eventually placed on the inactive list for "personal reasons," missing two months of the season. He batted .261/.302/.337 for Charlotte. He played six games in August for the Gulf Coast Rays of the Rookie-level Gulf Coast League.

In 2015, Toles attended spring training with the Rays. However, he was released prior to the season for disciplinary reasons and did not play professional baseball that year.

=== Los Angeles Dodgers ===
Toles signed with the Los Angeles Dodgers after the 2015 season. He began 2016 with the Rancho Cucamonga Quakes of the High-A California League, and was promoted to the Tulsa Drillers of the Double-A Texas League and Oklahoma City Dodgers of the Triple-A Pacific Coast League during the season.

The Dodgers called him up on July 8, 2016. Toles made his MLB debut as the starting center fielder that night against the San Diego Padres and had one hit in four at bats, a double in his first plate appearance, off Andrew Cashner. He hit his first home run on August 22 off Josh Smith of the Cincinnati Reds. He hit his first grand slam on August 31 off Adam Ottavino of the Colorado Rockies. Toles finished the season with a .314 batting average in 48 games, along with three home runs and 16 runs batted in. Manager Dave Roberts likened Toles's rookie season to a "dream". In the postseason, he hit .364 in 22 at bats.

Toles returned to the Dodgers in 2017, making their Opening Day starting lineup. For the first month of the season, he was the Dodgers' primary leadoff hitter and starting left fielder against right-handed pitching. However, on May 9 he tore his anterior cruciate ligament in his right knee as he pulled up on the warning track at Dodger Stadium, was placed on the disabled list, and had season-ending surgery. In 31 games he batted .271 with five home runs and 15 runs batted in.

In 2018 with the Dodgers, he batted .233/.281/.300 in 17 games. He spent most of the season with Oklahoma City, where he hit .306 in 71 games.

Toles did not report to spring training in 2019, and the Dodgers announced that he was dealing with a personal matter and was out indefinitely. He was placed on the restricted list at the start of the season. He eventually reported to camp on April 30 for extended spring training but he left the club a month later to return to his family. He did not return to the team during the 2019 season and did not appear in any games.

== Personal life ==
Toles was born in Decatur, Georgia. He is the son of Alvin Toles, who played college football at the University of Tennessee and then played in the National Football League.

=== Mental health issues ===
Toles has battled mental health issues including bipolar disorder and schizophrenia. While signed to the Rays and playing in the minor leagues, he had anxiety and struggled to sleep. As a result, he showed up late at the ballpark and made mental mistakes on the field, leading to criticisms from manager Jared Sandberg. Toles eventually asked for a release from the Rays and spent time in a mental health treatment center in 2015. Between the 2015 and 2016 Major League Baseball seasons, Toles spent two weeks working in the frozen-foods section of a Georgia Kroger grocery store. In 2018, Toles was diagnosed with bipolar disorder and schizophrenia after spending two weeks in a mental health hospital.

Toles was arrested and jailed on a misdemeanor charge of trespassing on June 22, 2020, after police found him sleeping behind Key West Airport and refusing to leave the area. His address was listed as "the streets of Key West". While the charges were dropped, Toles continued to drift through hospitals and homeless shelters until his father gained guardianship of him.

The Dodgers signed Toles to contracts every season from 2018 through 2025 so that he would have access to the team's health insurance. The contracts were non-salary and Toles was placed on the restricted list for the entire season. However, his eligibility ran out after the 2025 season and that system was no longer available, though the Dodgers expressed a desire to continue helping him through other measures.
