= Dexter Fowler =

American baseball player (born 1986)

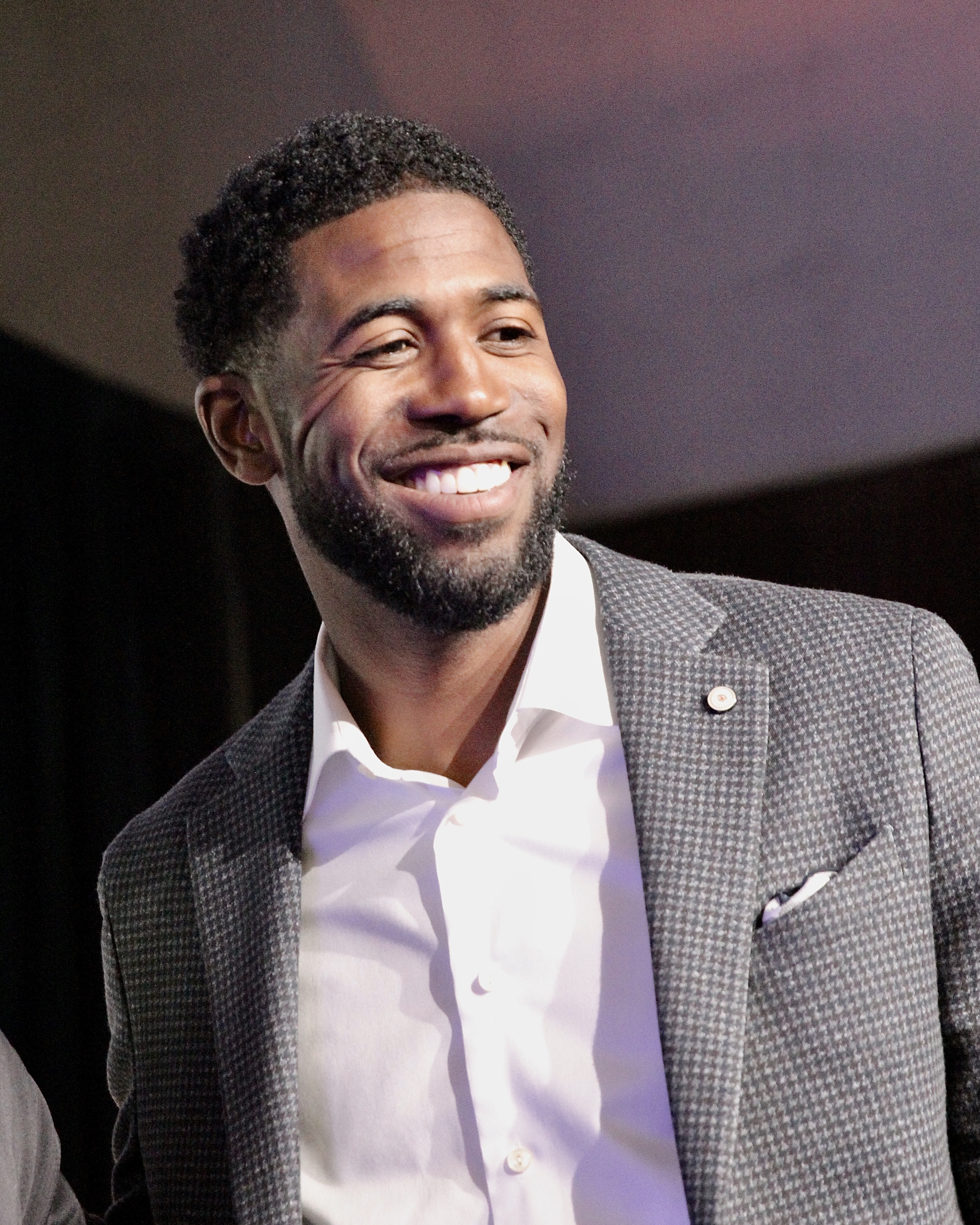
- Fowler at SXSW 2025
- Center fielder
- Born: March 22, 1986 (age 40); Atlanta, Georgia, U.S.
- Batted: Switch Threw: Right

MLB debut
- September 2, 2008, for the Colorado Rockies

Last MLB appearance
- April 9, 2021, for the Los Angeles Angels

MLB statistics
- Batting average: .259
- Home runs: 127
- Runs batted in: 517
- Stats at Baseball Reference

Teams
- Colorado Rockies (2008–2013); Houston Astros (2014); Chicago Cubs (2015–2016); St. Louis Cardinals (2017–2020); Los Angeles Angels (2021)

Career highlights and awards
- All-Star (2016); World Series champion (2016)
Medals
Men's baseball
Representing United States
Olympic Games
Bronze medal – third place	2008 Beijing	Team

William Dexter Fowler (born March 22, 1986) is an American former professional baseball center fielder. He played 14 seasons in Major League Baseball (MLB) for the Colorado Rockies, Houston Astros, Chicago Cubs, St. Louis Cardinals, and Los Angeles Angels. He participated in the 2008 Summer Olympics as a member of the United States national baseball team and won the World Series with the Cubs in 2016. He led all MLB players with 72 triples during the 2010s.

== Early life ==
William Dexter Fowler was born in Atlanta, Georgia, and attended Milton High School in Milton, Georgia. At Milton, Fowler hit .457 with 14 home runs in 105 at-bats. Fowler rejected offers from Harvard and the University of Miami in order to play Major League Baseball, after having originally committed to Miami. Before signing with the Rockies, Fowler was exclusively a right-handed hitter.

=== International career ===
As a minor leaguer during the 2008 season, Fowler was selected to represent the United States in the 2008 Summer Olympics in Beijing, China. He and the U.S. team ended up winning the bronze medal in the Olympics by defeating Japan, 8–4, in the bronze medal game.

== Professional career ==
=== Draft and minor leagues ===
Fowler was drafted by the Colorado Rockies in the 14th round of the 2004 Major League Baseball draft. In 2008, he was selected by Major League Baseball to play in the All-Star Futures Game at Yankee Stadium.

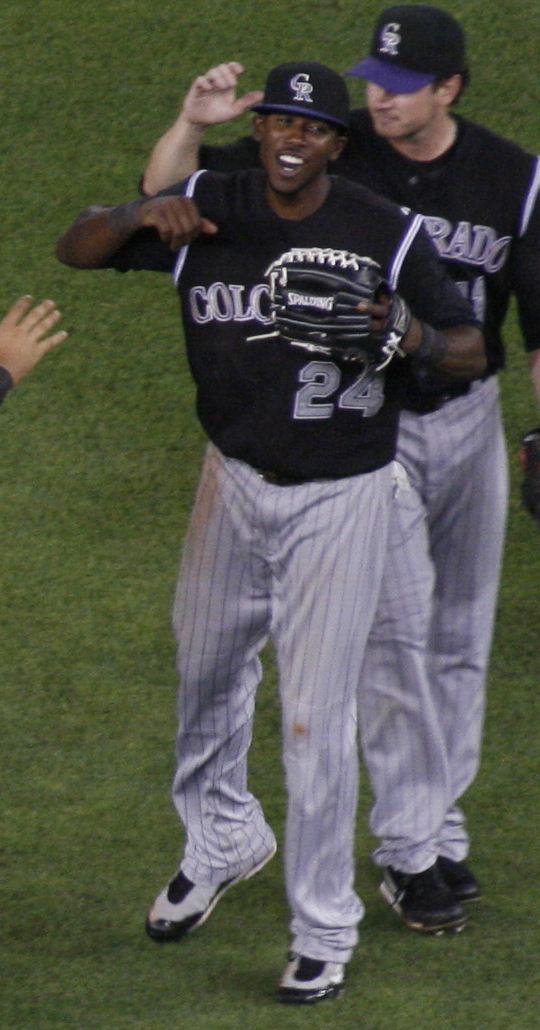
Fowler with the Colorado Rockies

Fowler was batting .337 with nine home runs, 61 runs batted in (RBIs) and 20 stolen bases for the Rockies' Double-A Texas League affiliate, the Tulsa Drillers, prior to playing for Team USA in the 2008 Olympics.

=== Colorado Rockies (2008–2013) ===
Fowler was called up to the Major Leagues for the first time on September 2, 2008. He made his debut that same day in a 6–5 extra-inning home win over the San Francisco Giants, coming in as a pinch runner in the bottom of the 10th inning; he was subsequently picked off at first base. In Fowler's first at-bat in the bottom of the third inning of a 9–2 home loss against the Giants the following day, he flied out to right field.

On September 10, 2008, Fowler recorded his first hit, an infield single, off of Will Ohman in the top of the seventh inning of a 9–5 road loss against the Atlanta Braves.

On April 8, 2009, Fowler hit his first career home run off Doug Davis of the Arizona Diamondbacks, as part of a 9–2 road win. He hit the home run on the first pitch of the game, becoming the first player in Rockies history to do so.

On April 27, 2009, Fowler tied a modern-day rookie record when he stole five bases against the San Diego Padres in a 12–7 victory.

In 2010, Fowler led the Majors in triples, accumulating 14 on the season. In 439 at-bats on the year, he had six home runs, 36 RBIs, 73 runs scored, and 114 total base hits.

In 2011, Fowler was third in the National League in triples, hitting 15 that season. In 481 at-bats on the year, he hit five home runs, 45 RBIs, 84 runs scored, and 128 total base hits.

The 2012 season saw Fowler's batting stats increase to career-highs. He hit 13 home runs, 53 RBIs, and a batting average of .300 in 454 at-bats.

However, much of his success came while hitting at home, Coors Field. His home OPS was .880, but only .694 on the road.

=== Houston Astros (2014) ===
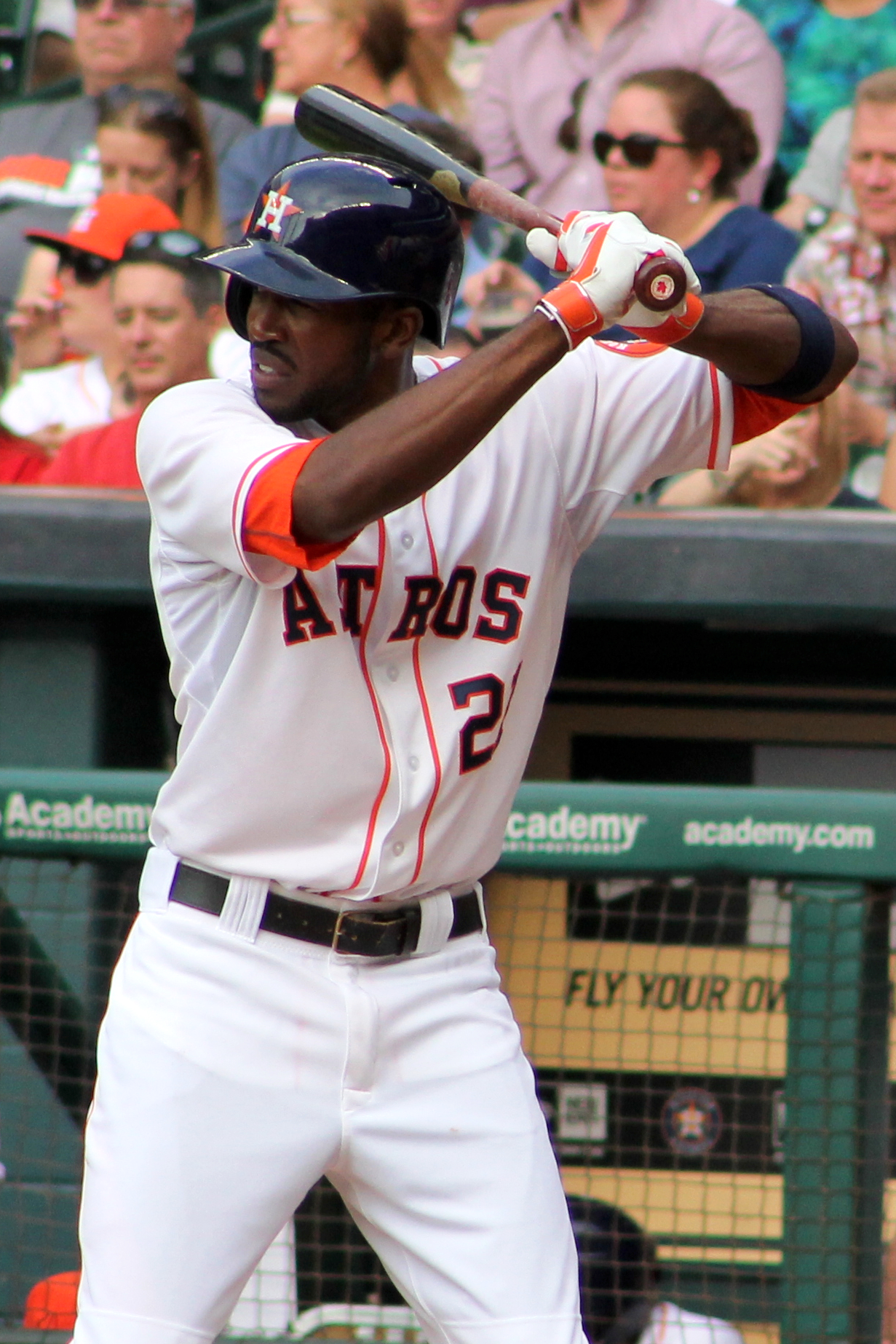
Fowler with the Houston Astros

On December 3, 2013, Fowler was traded, along with a player to be named later to the Houston Astros for outfielder Brandon Barnes and pitcher Jordan Lyles. The Rockies eventually sent cash to the Astros to complete the deal instead of the player to be named later. He hit .276 in 116 games for the Astros during the 2014 season.

=== Chicago Cubs (2015–2016) ===
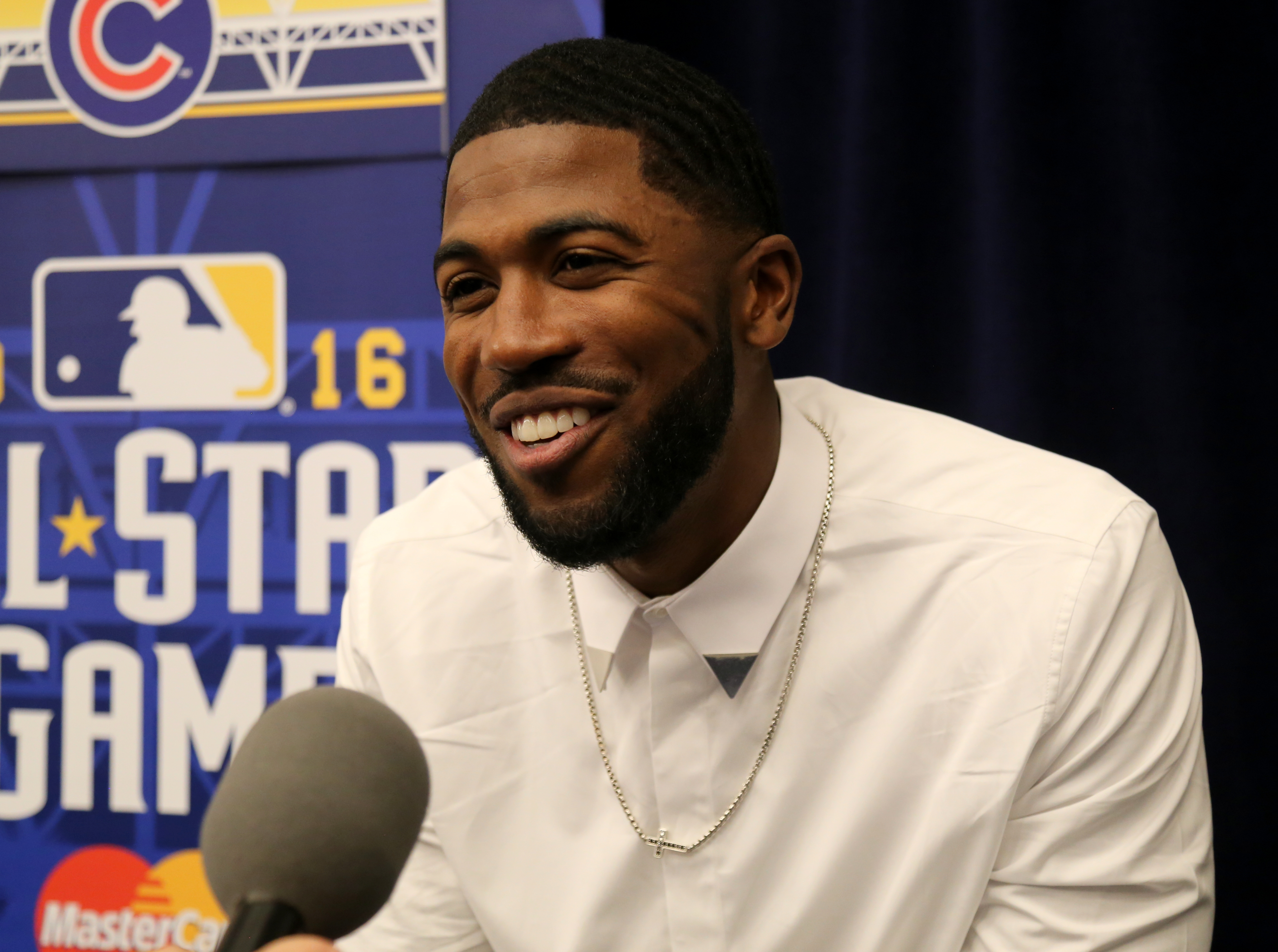
Fowler in 2016

On January 19, 2015, Fowler was traded to the Chicago Cubs for Luis Valbuena and Dan Straily. He ended the 2015 season with a .250 average, 102 runs scored, 46 RBIs, 17 home runs, and 20 stolen bases. In the 2015 National League wild card game, Fowler helped the Cubs to a 4–0 win over the Pittsburgh Pirates with three hits, three runs scored, one RBI, one home run, and a stolen base.

With the Cubs finishing the 2015 season with a 97–65 record, the team entered the postseason for the first time in seven years. In nine postseason games, Fowler batted .396 with two home runs and three RBIs. In Game 4 of the 2015 NLCS against the New York Mets, he was the final batter to strike out looking as the Cubs were eliminated from the postseason.

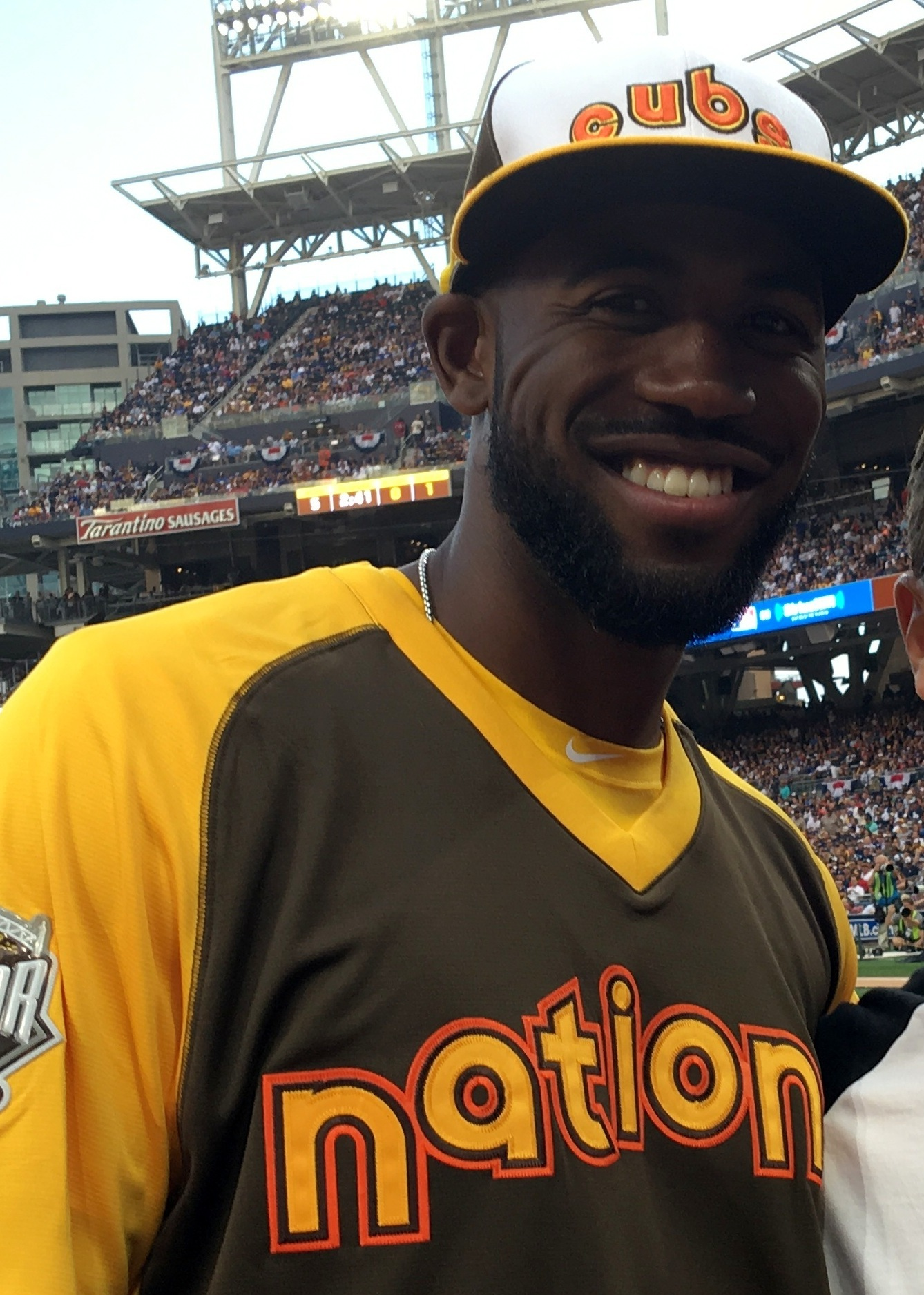
Fowler at the 2016 Home Run Derby

Fowler signed a one-year contract with the Cubs that included a mutual option for the 2017 season on February 25, 2016, despite reportedly agreeing to a three-year contract with the Baltimore Orioles earlier that week. The Orioles claimed that Fowler's insistence on an opt-out clause after one year was the holdup on the deal and that they were blindsided when he signed with the Cubs. Fowler on the other hand insisted he never had agreed to a deal with the Orioles and he and his agent blamed the team and the media for leaking incorrect information.

Fowler earned his first career MLB ejection for arguing a strike three call by umpire Vic Carapazza on May 5, 2016. Fowler was selected to his first All-Star Game in 2016 representing the Cubs along with six other teammates.

Fowler finished the year batting with a .276 average hitting 13 home runs and 48 RBIs and 84 runs scored. He swung at only 19.4% of pitches outside the strike zone (the lowest percentage in the majors).

On October 25, 2016, Dexter Fowler along with teammates Jason Heyward, Addison Russell, and Carl Edwards Jr. became the first African-Americans to play for the Cubs in a World Series game. Additionally, Fowler was the first African-American to appear and to bat for the Cubs in a World Series. Fowler is the first African-American to start for the Cubs in a World Series. (Note: Jackie Robinson's rookie season was 1947, which was two years after the Chicago Cubs' appearance in the 1945 World Series. In 1953, Ernie Banks, known as Mr. Cub, became the first African-American on the Cubs roster.)

Fowler led off Game 7 of the World Series with a home run, becoming the first player in history to lead off a World Series Game 7 with a home run. The Cubs won the game 8–7 in 10 innings, giving the team their first championship in 108 years. On November 5, Fowler declined his mutual option for the 2017 season and became a free agent.

=== St. Louis Cardinals (2017–2020) ===
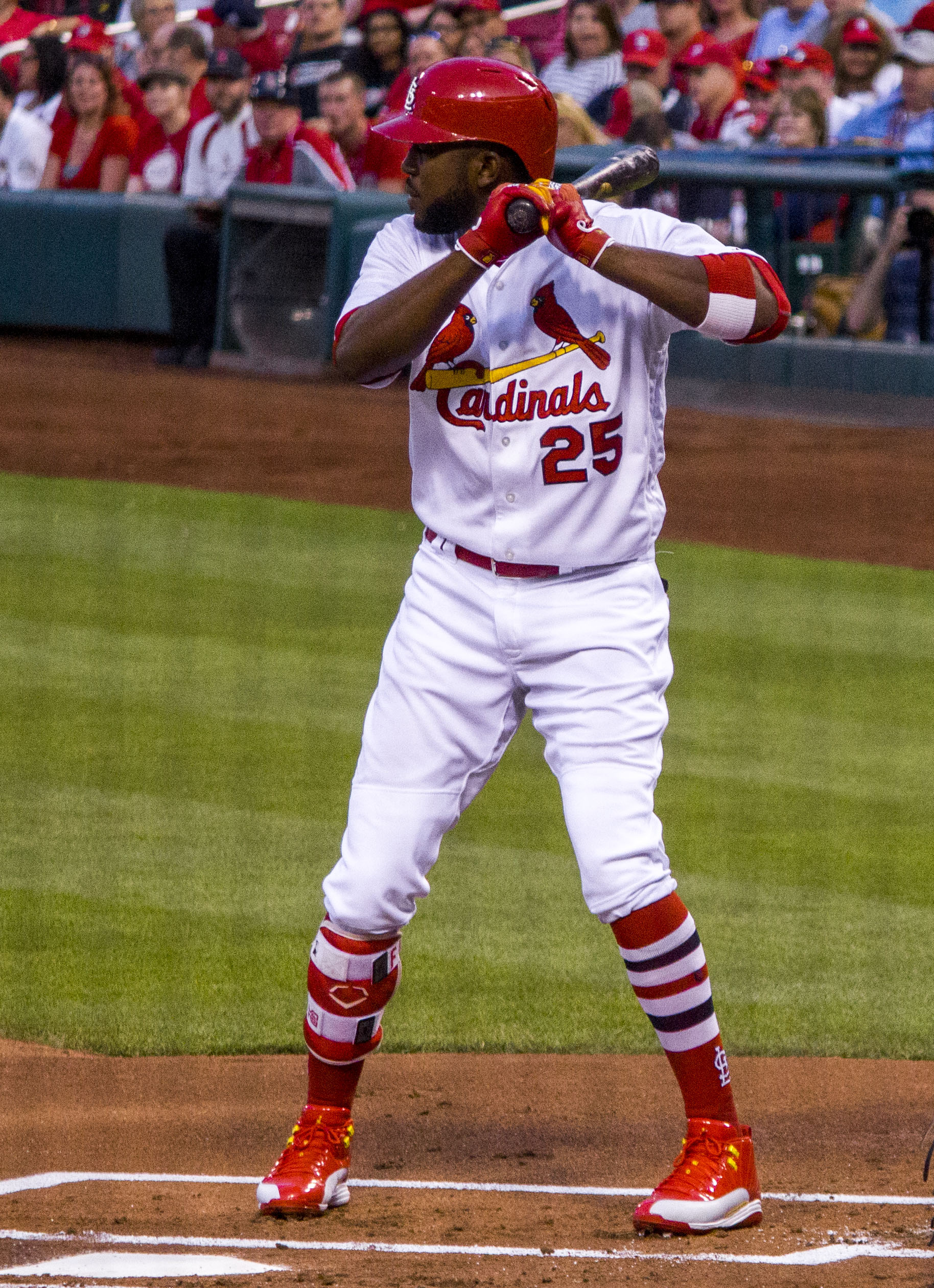
Dexter Fowler with the St. Louis Cardinals

On December 9, 2016, Fowler and the St. Louis Cardinals agreed to a five-year, $82.5 million deal. He hit his first home run and RBI as a Cardinal against Pittsburgh Pirates pitcher Gerrit Cole on April 19, 2017. Fowler finished his first season in St. Louis with a .264 batting average, 18 home runs, and 64 RBIs in 118 games.

Prior to the 2018 season, he agreed to shift positions to become the Cardinals' starting right fielder; the Cardinals moved Tommy Pham to center and had acquired Marcell Ozuna in the offseason. Fowler hit his first ever walk-off home run on May 6, 2018, in the bottom of the 14th inning against his former team, the Chicago Cubs. His two-run home run helped lead the Cardinals to a 4–3 victory. On August 21, 2018, Fowler was placed on the 60-day disabled list, ending a disappointing 2018 season in which he slashed .180/.278/.298 with eight home runs and 31 RBIs in 90 games.

Fowler returned healthy in 2019 as St. Louis' starting right fielder. Over 150 games during the regular season, he slashed .238/.346/.409 with 19 home runs and 67 RBIs.

In 2020 he batted .233/.317/.389 with 28 strikeouts in 90 at bats.

=== Los Angeles Angels (2021) ===
On February 4, 2021, the Cardinals traded Fowler and cash to the Los Angeles Angels for a player to be named later.

In an April 9 game against the Toronto Blue Jays, Fowler was carted off of the field after suffering an apparent knee injury after awkwardly sliding into second base. It was later revealed that Fowler had suffered a torn left ACL and would undergo season-ending surgery. On April 13, Fowler was placed on the 60-day injured list.

=== Toronto Blue Jays ===
On March 31, 2022, Fowler signed a minor league contract with the Toronto Blue Jays. Fowler appeared in 3 games for the Triple-A Buffalo Bisons, going 5-for-12 with 3 RBI. On May 3, Fowler requested and was granted his release by the Blue Jays.

On January 31, 2023, Fowler announced his retirement from professional baseball.

== Personal life ==
Fowler is married to Aliya Fowler. They have two daughters.

Fowler is a Christian.

Fowler is good friends with former teammate Chris Nelson, who is also from Georgia.

== See also ==
- List of Colorado Rockies team records
- List of Major League Baseball annual triples leaders
- List of Olympic medalists in baseball
- List of people from Atlanta
