= Major League Baseball Player of the Week Award =

Award in Major League Baseball

- Sport: Baseball
- League: Major League Baseball
- Awarded for: Best player of the week in National League and American League
- Country: United States, Canada

History
- First award: 1973 (NL); 1974 (AL)
- Most wins: 16, shared by Miguel Cabrera and Manny Ramirez

In Major League Baseball (MLB), the Player of the Week Award is given weekly during the regular season. It is given to two outstanding players, one each in the National League (NL) and American League (AL). The NL first awarded the honor during the 1973 season, and the AL began in 1974. Players at all positions are eligible for the award.

The award was first issued on April 16, 1973, by NL president Chub Feeney. It was won by outfielder Jimmy Wynn of the Houston Astros, then a member of the NL. The first AL winner was Reggie Jackson, then with the Oakland Athletics, announced on April 10, 1974.

The most times a player has won the award is 16, accomplished by both Miguel Cabrera and Manny Ramirez. Several other players have won the award 12 or more times: Barry Bonds (15), Aaron Judge (15), Albert Pujols (14), Frank Thomas (14), Alex Rodriguez (13), Nolan Ryan (13), George Brett (12), J. D. Martinez (12), Mike Piazza (12), and Gary Sheffield (12).

The tables below list all winners since 2008, along with each player's team and a recap of the player's accomplishments for the week in question. A complete list of winners, since the inception of the award, can be found on the MLB.com and Baseball-Reference.com websites as noted below.

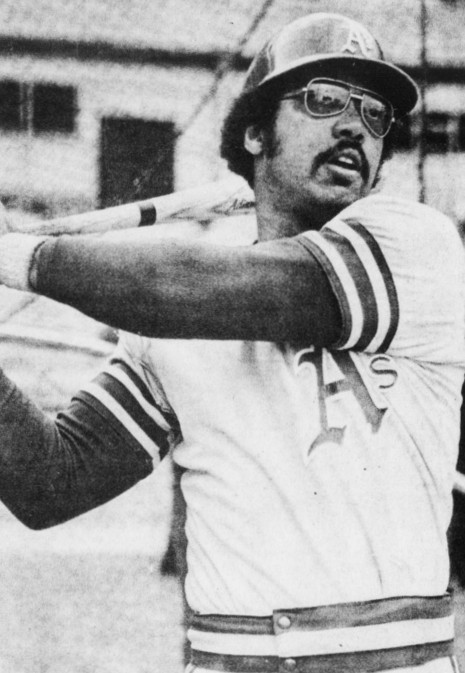
Reggie Jackson was the first Player of the Week for the American League, in 1974.

Key to abbreviations
Batters		Pitchers	
Abbr.	Definition	Abbr.	Definition
BA	Batting average	BAA	Batting average against
HR	Home run	CG	Complete game
OPS	On-base plus slugging	ERA	Earned run average
RBI	Run batted in	IP	Innings pitched
SB	Stolen base	K/BB	Strikeout-to-walk ratio
SLG	Slugging percentage	SHO	Shutout

== 2026 ==
Week	American League			National League		
Week	Player(s)	Team(s)	Highlights	Player(s)	Team(s)	Highlights
March 25 – March 29	Chase DeLauter	Cleveland Guardians	.353 (6–17); 5 Runs; 4 HR; 5 RBI; 1.412 OPS	Sal Stewart	Cincinnati Reds	.700 (7–10); 2 Runs; 1 HR; 2 RBI; 2.069 OPS
March 30 – April 5	Yordan Alvarez	Houston Astros	.471 (8–17); 7 Runs; 3 HR; 8 RBI; 1.733 OPS	Andy Pages	Los Angeles Dodgers	.583 (14–24); 5 Runs; 2 HR; 7 RBI; 1.532 OPS
April 6 – April 12	José Soriano	Los Angeles Angels	2–0; 0.60 ERA; 15 IP; K/BB 20/3; .102 BAA	James Wood	Washington Nationals	.545 (12–22); 8 Runs; 3 HR; 8 RBI; 1.746 OPS
April 13 – April 19	José Ramírez	Cleveland Guardians	.364 (8–22); 9 Runs; 4 HR; 5 RBI; 1.488 OPS	Nico Hoerner	Chicago Cubs	.346 (9–26); 4 Runs; 2 HR; 11 RBI; .934 OPS
April 20 – April 26	Carlos Cortes	Athletics	.542 (13–24); 4 Runs; 3 HR; 7 RBI; 1.625 OPS	Ildemaro Vargas	Arizona Diamondbacks	.364 (8–22); 7 Runs; 4 HR; 12 RBI; 1.409 OPS
April 27 – May 3	Byron Buxton	Minnesota Twins	.345 (10–29); 6 Runs; 5 HR; 7 RBI; 1.303 OPS	Alec Burleson	St. Louis Cardinals	.407 (11–27); 8 Runs; 2 HR; 11 RBI; 1.225 OPS
May 4 – May 10	Bobby Witt Jr.	Kansas City Royals	.407 (11–27); 7 Runs; 3 HR; 4 RBI; 1.263 OPS	Cristopher Sánchez	Philadelphia Phillies	2–0; 0.00 ERA; 15 IP; K/BB 17/1; .170 BAA
May 11 – May 17	Ángel Martínez	Cleveland Guardians	.368 (7–19); 8 Runs; 4 HR; 7 RBI; 1.481 OPS	Gavin Sheets	San Diego Padres	.625 (10–16); 6 Runs; 4 HR; 8 RBI; 2.177 OPS
May 18 – May 24	Willson Contreras	Boston Red Sox	.458 (11–24); 5 Runs; 2 HR; 8 RBI; 1.355 OPS	Ketel Marte	Arizona Diamondbacks	.536 (15–28); 11 Runs; 3 HR; 12 RBI; 1.563 OPS
May 25 – May 31	Ben Rice	New York Yankees	.462 (12–26); 8 Runs; 1 HR; 11 RBI; 1.418 OPS	Jacob Misiorowski	Milwaukee Brewers	2–0; 0.64 ERA; 14 IP; K/BB 20/1; .106 BAA
June 1 – June 7	Yordan Alvarez	Houston Astros	.476 (10–21); 6 Runs; 2 HR; 9 RBI; 1.386 OPS	Pete Crow-Armstrong	Chicago Cubs	.440 (11–25); 4 Runs; 4 HR; 6 RBI; 1.401 OPS
June 8 – June 14	Byron Buxton	Minnesota Twins	.458 (11–24); 6 Runs; 4 HR; 7 RBI; 1.583 OPS	Jackson Chourio	Milwaukee Brewers	.448 (13–29); 8 Runs; 5 HR; 10 RBI; 1.417 OPS
June 8 – June 14	Byron Buxton	Minnesota Twins	.458 (11–24); 6 Runs; 4 HR; 7 RBI; 1.583 OPS	Jacob Misiorowski	Milwaukee Brewers	1–0; 0.00 ERA; 9 IP; K/BB 15/0; .037 BAA; 95-pitch CG SHO
June 15 – June 21	Logan Gilbert	Seattle Mariners	2–0; 1.35 ERA; 13.1 IP; K/BB 18/3; .116 BAA	Pete Crow-Armstrong	Chicago Cubs	.550 (11–20); 5 Runs; 4 HR; 7 RBI; 1.900 OPS; hit for cycle
June 22 – June 28	Junior Caminero	Tampa Bay Rays	.423 (11–26); 8 Runs; 7 HR; 15 RBI; 1.731 OPS	Luis García Jr.	Washington Nationals	.526 (10–19); 8 Runs; 6 HR; 9 RBI; 2.170 OPS
June 29 – July 5	Yordan Alvarez	Houston Astros	.435 (10–23); 4 Runs; 4 HR; 11 RBI; 1.418 OPS	Otto Lopez	Miami Marlins	.500 (14–28); 7 Runs; 3 HR; 7 RBI; 1.536 OPS
July 6 – July 12	Ben Rice	New York Yankees	.423 (11–26); 6 Runs; 5 HR; 12 RBI; 1.577 OPS	James Wood	Washington Nationals	.500 (10–20); 11 Runs; 5 HR; 8 RBI; 1.955 OPS
July 16 – July 19	Wilyer Abreu	Boston Red Sox	.357 (5–14); 5 Runs; 4 HR; 6 RBI; 1.685 OPS	Drake Baldwin	Atlanta Braves	.714 (10–14); 5 Runs; 3 HR; 8 RBI; 2.090 OPS
July 20 – July 26	Jeremy Peña	Houston Astros	.500 (13–26); 10 Runs; 5 HR; 8 RBI; 1.577 OPS	CJ Abrams	Washington Nationals	.577 (15–26); 8 Runs; 6 HR; 12 RBI; 1.939 OPS
July 27 – August 2	Ceddanne Rafaela	Boston Red Sox	.419 (13–31); 7 Runs; 5 HR; 11 RBI; 1.387 OPS	Sandy Alcantara	Miami Marlins	2–0; 0.00 ERA; 13.0 IP; K/BB 10/3; .211 BAA
August 3 – August 9	Wilyer Abreu	Boston Red Sox	.438 (7–16); 7 Runs; 3 HR; 9 RBI; 1.584 OPS	Jake McCarthy	Colorado Rockies	.519 (14–27); 8 Runs; 2 HR; 5 RBI; 1.352 OPS
August 10 – August 16	Pete Alonso	Baltimore Orioles	.545 (12–22); 5 Runs; 2 HR; 5 RBI; 1.493 OPS	Corbin Carroll	Arizona Diamondbacks	.409 (9–22); 5 Runs; 7 XBH; 2 HR; 3 RBI; 1.519 OPS
August 17 – August 23	Zach Neto	Los Angeles Angels	.500 (14–28); 5 Runs; 2 HR; 9 RBI; 1.429 OPS	Fernando Tatis Jr.	San Diego Padres	.480 (12–25); 6 Runs; 4 HR; 11 RBI; 1.521 OPS
August 24 – August 30	Cal Raleigh	Seattle Mariners	.389 (7–18); 6 Runs; 5 HR; 6 RBI; 1.800 OPS	Daylen Lile	Washington Nationals	.458 (11–24); 7 Runs; 3 HR; 10 RBI; 1.533 OPS
August 31 – September 6	Carter Jensen	Kansas City Royals	.421 (8–19); 6 Runs; 3 HR; 6 RBI; 1.634 OPS	Rafael Devers	San Francisco Giants	.385 (10–26); 8 Runs; 6 HR; 13 RBI; 1.669 OPS
September 7 – September 13	Victor Mesa Jr.	Tampa Bay Rays	.556 (10–18); 8 Runs; 6 XBH; 3 HR; 6 RBI; 1.914 OPS	Jackson Merrill	San Diego Padres	.480 (12–25); 5 Runs; 7 XBH; 3 HR; 12 RBI; 1.521 OPS
September 14 – September 20	Miguel Vargas	Chicago White Sox	.348 (8–23); 5 Runs; 3 HR; 9 RBI; 1.283 OPS	Jake Cronenworth	San Diego Padres	.464 (13–28); 8 Runs; 2 HR; 8 RBI; 1.302 OPS
September 21 – September 27	Pete Alonso	Baltimore Orioles	.389 (7–18); 8 Runs; 5 HR; 8 RBI; 1.722 OPS	Nolan Arenado	Arizona Diamondbacks	.435 (10–23); 7 Runs; 3 HR; 8 RBI; 1.432 OPS

== 2025 ==
Week	American League			National League		
Week	Player(s)	Team(s)	Highlights	Player(s)	Team(s)	Highlights
March 27 – March 31	Aaron Judge	New York Yankees	.545 (6–11); 8 Runs; 4 HR; 11 RBI; 2.461 OPS	Eugenio Suárez	Arizona Diamondbacks	.235 (4–17); 5 Runs; 4 HR; 7 RBI; 1.555 OPS
April 1 – April 6	Alex Bregman	Boston Red Sox	.407 (11–27); 7 Runs; 2 HR; 10 RBI; 1.263 OPS	Kyle Tucker	Chicago Cubs	.391 (9–23); 11 Runs; 3 HR; 8 RBI; 1.461 OPS
April 7 – April 13	Ty France	Minnesota Twins	.440 (11–25); 6 Runs; 2 HR; 6 RBI; 1.315 OPS	William Contreras	Milwaukee Brewers	.391 (9–23); 8 Runs; 3 HR; 10 RBI; 1.293 OPS
April 14 – April 20	Dylan Moore	Seattle Mariners	.385 (10–26); 6 Runs; 3 HR; 5 RBI; 1.177 OPS	Fernando Tatis Jr.	San Diego Padres	.375 (9–24); 9 Runs; 4 HR; 7 RBI; 1.441 OPS
April 21 – April 27	Jorge Polanco	Seattle Mariners	.471 (8–17); 5 Runs; 4 HR; 8 RBI; 1.844 OPS	Andy Pages	Los Angeles Dodgers	.650 (13–20); 5 Runs; 3 HR; 6 RBI; 1.900 OPS
April 21 – April 27	Jorge Polanco	Seattle Mariners	.471 (8–17); 5 Runs; 4 HR; 8 RBI; 1.844 OPS	Eugenio Suárez	Arizona Diamondbacks	.400 (8–20); 9 Runs; 4 HR; 5 RBI; 1.550 OPS; 4-HR game on 4/26
April 28 – May 4	Riley Greene	Detroit Tigers	.464 (13–28); 7 Runs; 4 HR; 8 RBI; 1.393 OPS	Kyle Stowers	Miami Marlins	.421 (8–19); 5 Runs; 4 HR; 10 RBI; 1.517 OPS
May 5 – May 11	Rafael Devers	Boston Red Sox	.476 (10–21); 3 Runs; 2 HR; 8 RBI; 1.386 OPS	Freddie Freeman	Los Angeles Dodgers	.500 (14–28); 7 Runs; 3 HR; 12 RBI; 1.500 OPS
May 12 – May 18	Miguel Vargas	Chicago White Sox	.417 (10–24); 5 Runs; 4 HR; 9 RBI; 1.423 OPS	Will Benson	Cincinnati Reds	.526 (10–19); 5 Runs; 5 HR; 10 RBI; 1.959 OPS
May 19 – May 25	Taylor Ward	Los Angeles Angels	.407 (11–27); 9 Runs; 3 HR; 12 RBI; 1.382 OPS	Seiya Suzuki	Chicago Cubs	.480 (12–25); 9 Runs; 3 HR; 10 RBI; 1.552 OPS
May 26 – June 1	Cal Raleigh	Seattle Mariners	.348 (8–23); 6 Runs; 6 HR; 10 RBI; 1.575 OPS	Christian Yelich	Milwaukee Brewers	.500 (10–20); 5 Runs; 3 HR; 9 RBI; 1.545 OPS
May 26 – June 1	Junior Caminero	Tampa Bay Rays	.379 (11–29); 8 Runs; 4 HR; 13 RBI; 1.331 OPS	Christian Yelich	Milwaukee Brewers	.500 (10–20); 5 Runs; 3 HR; 9 RBI; 1.545 OPS
June 2 – June 8	Vinnie Pasquantino	Kansas City Royals	.348 (13–26); 4 Runs; 2 HR; 7 RBI; 1.305 OPS	Pete Alonso	New York Mets	.400 (12–30); 9 Runs; 5 HR; 15 RBI; 1.452 OPS
June 9 – June 15	Josh Smith	Texas Rangers	.423 (11–26); 9 Runs; 2 HR; 4 RBI; 1.269 OPS	Ronald Acuña Jr.	Atlanta Braves	.619 (13–31); 8 Runs; 3 HR; 6 RBI; 1.788 OPS
June 16 – June 22	Cal Raleigh	Seattle Mariners	.417 (10–24); 10 Runs; 5 HR; 12 RBI; 1.606 OPS	Eugenio Suárez	Arizona Diamondbacks	.440 (11–25); 5 Runs; 4 HR; 10 RBI; 1.464 OPS
June 23 – June 29	Tarik Skubal	Detroit Tigers	2–0; 2.77 ERA; 13 IP; K/BB 21/2; .152 BAA	Spencer Steer	Cincinnati Reds	.522 (12–23); 5 Runs; 3 HR; 7 RBI; 1.477 OPS
June 30 – July 6	George Springer	Toronto Blue Jays	.429 (12–28); 9 Runs; 5 HR; 13 RBI; 1.464 OPS	Michael Busch	Chicago Cubs	.565 (13–23); 7 Runs; 4 HR; 7 RBI; 1.789 OPS
June 30 – July 6	George Springer	Toronto Blue Jays	.429 (12–28); 9 Runs; 5 HR; 13 RBI; 1.464 OPS	Zack Wheeler	Philadelphia Phillies	2–0; 0.53 ERA; 17 IP; K/BB 22/0; .123 BAA; CG SHO
July 7 – July 13	José Ramírez	Cleveland Guardians	.269 (7–26); 10 Runs; 4 HR; 11 RBI; 1.163 OPS	Kyle Stowers	Miami Marlins	.500 (9–18); 6 Runs; 3 HR; 8 RBI; 1.583 OPS
July 14 – July 20	Nick Kurtz	Athletics	.583 (7–12); 4 Runs; 1 HR; 4 RBI; 1.949 OPS	Eugenio Suárez	Arizona Diamondbacks	.500 (5–10); 5 Runs; 4 HR; 7 RBI; 2.283 OPS
July 21 – July 27	Nick Kurtz	Athletics	.600 (15–25); 9 Runs; 5 HR; 11 RBI; 2.043 OPS; 4-HR game on 7/25	Michael Harris II	Atlanta Braves	.478 (11–23); 5 Runs; 2 HR; 3 RBI; 1.500 OPS
July 28 – August 3	Trevor Story	Boston Red Sox	.391 (9–23); 7 Runs; 3 HR; 8 RBI; 1.418 OPS	Warming Bernabel	Colorado Rockies	.462 (12–26); 5 Runs; 2 HR; 7 RBI; 1.385 OPS
August 4 – August 10	Luke Keaschall	Minnesota Twins	.455 (10–22); 2 Runs; 2 HR; 10 RBI; 1.318 OPS	Isaac Collins	Milwaukee Brewers	.476 (10–21); 6 Runs; 2 HR; 8 RBI; 1.529 OPS
August 11 – August 17	Zach Neto	Los Angeles Angels	.320 (8–25); 5 Runs; 4 HR; 8 RBI; 1.254 OPS	Francisco Lindor	New York Mets	.560 (14–25); 7 Runs; 3 HR; 7 RBI; 1.647 OPS
August 18 – August 24	Vinnie Pasquantino	Kansas City Royals	.379 (11–29); 7 Runs; 6 HR; 12 RBI; 1.507 OPS	Ranger Suárez	Philadelphia Phillies	2–0; 1.32 ERA; 13.2 IP; K/BB 21/0; .146 BAA
August 25 – August 31	Cody Bellinger	New York Yankees	.444 (12–27); 6 Runs; 2 HR; 8 RBI; 1.278 OPS	Kyle Schwarber	Philadelphia Phillies	.214 (6–28); 7 Runs; 4 HR; 10 RBI; 1.005 OPS; 4-HR game on 8/28
August 25 – August 31	Cody Bellinger	New York Yankees	.444 (12–27); 6 Runs; 2 HR; 8 RBI; 1.278 OPS	Rafael Devers	San Francisco Giants	.478 (11–23); 9 Runs; 3 HR; 10 RBI; 1.513 OPS
September 1 – September 7	Jo Adell	Los Angeles Angels	.407 (11–27); 6 Runs; 5 HR; 12 RBI; 1.448 OPS	Hunter Goodman	Colorado Rockies	.476 (10–21); 4 Runs; 3 HR; 10 RBI; 1.500 OPS
September 8 – September 14	Aaron Judge	New York Yankees	.450 (9–20); 9 Runs; 5 HR; 5 RBI; 1.760 OPS	Mookie Betts	Los Angeles Dodgers	.462 (12–26); 7 Runs; 2 HR; 10 RBI; 1.363 OPS
September 15 – September 21	Yandy Díaz	Tampa Bay Rays	.591 (13–22); 5 Runs; 1 HR; 4 RBI; 1.528 OPS	Matt Olson	Atlanta Braves	.400 (12–30); 9 Runs; 3 HR; 10 RBI; 1.386 OPS
September 22 – September 28	Aaron Judge	New York Yankees	.450 (9–20); 7 Runs; 4 HR; 9 RBI; 1.693 OPS	Seiya Suzuki	Chicago Cubs	.318 (7–22); 6 Runs; 5 HR; 12 RBI; 1.420 OPS

== 2024 ==
Week	American League			National League		
Week	Player(s)	Team(s)	Highlights	Player(s)	Team(s)	Highlights
March 28 – March 31	Juan Soto	New York Yankees	.529 (9–17); 2 Runs; 1 HR; 4 RBI; 1.365 OPS	Lourdes Gurriel Jr.	Arizona Diamondbacks	.471 (8–17); 6 Runs; 3 HR; 10 RBI; 1.644 OPS
April 1 – April 7	Ronel Blanco	Houston Astros	2–0; 0.00 ERA; 15 IP; K/BB 11/6; no-hitter	Spencer Steer	Cincinnati Reds	.409 (9–22); 5 Runs; 3 HR; 9 RBI; 1.455 OPS
April 8 – April 14	Colton Cowser	Baltimore Orioles	.435 (10–23); 6 Runs; 4 HR; 12 RBI; 1.611 OPS	Pete Alonso	New York Mets	.429 (9–21); 8 Runs; 4 HR; 7 RBI; 1.604 OPS
April 15 – April 21	Jordan Westburg	Baltimore Orioles	.478 (11–23); 5 Runs; 2 HR; 8 RBI; 1.413 OPS	Trea Turner	Philadelphia Phillies	.462 (12–26); 10 Runs; 1 HR; 4 RBI; 1.250 OPS
April 22 – April 28	Anthony Rizzo	New York Yankees	.407 (11–27); 8 Runs; 4 HR; 7 RBI; 1.355 OPS; 300th career HR	Alec Bohm	Philadelphia Phillies	.567 (17–30); 6 Runs; 1 HR; 8 RBI; 1.514 OPS
April 29 – May 5	Brent Rooker	Oakland Athletics	.438 (7–16); 6 Runs; 3 HR; 7 RBI; 1.613 OPS	Shohei Ohtani	Los Angeles Dodgers	.524 (11–21); 6 Runs; 3 HR; 7 RBI; 1.535 OPS
May 6 – May 12	Marcus Semien	Texas Rangers	.419 (13–31); 8 Runs; 2 HR; 7 RBI; 1.086 OPS	Eddie Rosario	Washington Nationals	.467 (7–15); 7 Runs; 3 HR; 5 RBI; 1.733 OPS
May 13 – May 19	Aaron Judge	New York Yankees	.500 (10–20); 7 Runs; 3 HR; 5 RBI; 1.830 OPS	Luis Matos	San Francisco Giants	.385 (10–26); 3 Runs; 2 HR; 16 RBI; 1.116 OPS
May 20 – May 26	Bobby Witt Jr.	Kansas City Royals	.385 (10–26); 6 Runs; 4 HR; 11 RBI; 1.356 OPS	Luis Arráez	San Diego Padres	.472 (17–36); 2 Runs; 1 HR; 4 RBI; 1.083 OPS
May 27 – June 2	Juan Soto	New York Yankees	.435 (10–23); 7 Runs; 3 HR; 9 RBI; 1.500 OPS	Willy Adames	Milwaukee Brewers	.385 (10–26); 7 Runs; 2 HR; 10 RBI; 1.138 OPS
June 3 – June 9	Aaron Judge	New York Yankees	.500 (10–20); 8 Runs; 3 HR; 12 RBI; 1.200 OPS	Teoscar Hernández	Los Angeles Dodgers	.360 (9–25); 6 Runs; 4 HR; 10 RBI; 1.389 OPS
June 10 – June 16	Carlos Correa	Minnesota Twins	.548 (17–31), 9 Runs; 3 HR; 9 RBI; 1.447 OPS	J.D. Martinez	New York Mets	.450 (9–20); 5 Runs; 3 HR; 9 RBI; 1.643 OPS
June 17 – June 23	Bo Naylor	Cleveland Guardians	.400 (10–25); 7 Runs; 3 HR; 8 RBI; 1.303 OPS	Shohei Ohtani	Los Angeles Dodgers	.458 (11–24), 8 Runs; 4 HR; 11 RBI; 1.650 OPS
June 24 – June 30	Vladimir Guerrero Jr.	Toronto Blue Jays	.500 (13–26); 6 Runs; 4 HR; 17 RBI; 1.673 OPS	Jonathan India	Cincinnati Reds	.539 (14–26); 8 Runs; 0 HR; 5 RBI; 1.536 OPS
July 1 – July 7	José Miranda	Minnesota Twins	.700 (14–20); 7 Runs; 1 HR; 6 RBI; 1.777 OPS	Brenton Doyle	Colorado Rockies	.524 (11–21); 5 Runs; 4 HR; 9 RBI; 1.868 OPS
July 8 – July 14	Lawrence Butler	Oakland Athletics	.364 (8–22); 5 Runs; 5 HR; 13 RBI; 1.482 OPS	Rece Hinds	Cincinnati Reds	.426 (11–26); 7 Runs; 5 HR; 11 RBI; 1.656 OPS
July 15 – July 21	Bobby Witt Jr.	Kansas City Royals	.818 (9–11); 4 Runs; 1 HR; 3 RBI; 2.015 OPS	Gavin Lux	Los Angeles Dodgers	.556 (5–9); 3 Runs; 2 HR; 3 RBI; 2.000 OPS
July 22 – July 28	Tyler O'Neill	Boston Red Sox	.429 (9–12); 5 Runs; 4 HR; 8 RBI; 1.578 OPS	Dylan Cease	San Diego Padres	1–0; 0.00 ERA; 9 IP; K/BB 9/3; no-hitter
July 29 – August 4	Vladimir Guerrero Jr.	Toronto Blue Jays	.536 (15–28); 8 Runs; 3 HR; 8 RBI; 1.713 OPS	Blake Snell	San Francisco Giants	1–0; 0.00 ERA; 9 IP; K/BB 11/3; no-hitter
August 5 – August 11	Yordan Alvarez; Alex Bregman	Houston Astros	.429 (9–21); 7 Runs; 5 HR; 8 RBI; 1.777 OPS.444 (12–27); 9 Runs; 3 HR; 6 RBI; 1.389 OPS	Jackson Merrill	San Diego Padres	.417 (10–24); 9 Runs; 4 HR; 8 RBI; 1.506 OPS
August 12 – August 18	Bowden Francis	Toronto Blue Jays	2–0; 0.64 ERA; 14 IP; K/BB 15/0	Trea Turner	Philadelphia Phillies	.476 (10–21); 6 Runs; 1 HR; 4 RBI; 1.262 OPS
August 19 – August 25	Aaron Judge	New York Yankees	.381 (8–21); 8 Runs; 7 HR; 11 RBI; 1.948 OPS	Francisco Lindor	New York Mets	.345 (10–29); 6 Runs; 3 HR; 6 RBI; 1.180 OPS
August 26 – September 1	Lawrence Butler	Oakland Athletics	.500 (14–28); 8 Runs; 6 HR; 10 RBI; 1.767 OPS	Corbin Carroll	Arizona Diamondbacks	.391 (9–23); 8 Runs; 5 HR; 11 RBI; 1.510 OPS
September 2 – September 8	Gunnar Henderson	Baltimore Orioles	.417 (10–24); 6 Runs; 3 HR; 5 RBI; 1.298 OPS	Kyle Schwarber	Philadelphia Phillies	.462 (12–26); 9 Runs; 5 HR; 11 RBI; 1.654 OPS
September 9 – September 15	Keider Montero	Detroit Tigers	2–0; 0.00 ERA; 14 IP; K/BB 6/1	Michael Busch	Chicago Cubs	.478 (11–23); 7 Runs; 4 HR; 11 RBI; 1.567 OPS
September 16 – September 22	Julio Rodríguez	Seattle Mariners	.433 (13–30); 5 Runs; 3 HR; 9 RBI; 1.219 OPS	Shohei Ohtani	Los Angeles Dodgers	.500 (16–32); 11 Runs; 6 HR; 17 RBI; 1.668 OPS
September 23 – September 29	José Ramírez	Cleveland Guardians	.500 (7–14); 5 Runs; 2 HR; 6 RBI; 1.786 OPS	Shohei Ohtani	Los Angeles Dodgers	.520 (13–25); 6 Runs; 1 HR; 7 RBI; 1.371 OPS

== 2023 ==
Week	American League			National League		
Week	Player(s)	Team(s)	Highlights	Player(s)	Team(s)	Highlights
March 30 – April 2	Adam Duvall	Boston Red Sox	.571 (8–14); 6 Runs; 2 HR; 8 RBI; 1.957 OPS	C. J. Cron	Colorado Rockies	.467 (7–15); 3 Runs; 3 HR; 7 RBI; 1.729 OPS
April 3 – April 9	Matt Chapman	Toronto Blue Jays	.464 (13–28); 5 Runs; 2 HR; 12 RBI; 1.373 OPS	Bryan Reynolds	Pittsburgh Pirates	.480 (12–25); 9 Runs; 4 HR; 12 RBI; 1.584 OPS
April 10 – April 16	Gerrit Cole	New York Yankees	2–0; 1.13 ERA; 16 IP; K/BB 13/3; .140 BAA; SHO	Zac Gallen	Arizona Diamondbacks	2–0; 0.00 ERA; 13.2 IP; K/BB 18/1; .114 BAA
April 17 – April 23	Adolis García	Texas Rangers	.400 (8–20); 8 Runs; 4 HR; 14 RBI; 1.558 OPS	Max Muncy	Los Angeles Dodgers	.389 (7–18); 5 Runs; 5 HR; 7 RBI; 1.815 OPS
April 24 – April 30	Brent Rooker	Oakland Athletics	.417 (10–24); 8 Runs; 5 HR; 11 RBI; 1.629 OPS	Nick Senzel	Cincinnati Reds	.476 (10–21); 8 Runs; 2 HR; 9 RBI; 1.370 OPS
May 1 – May 7	Masataka Yoshida	Boston Red Sox	.480 (12–25); 7 Runs; 2 HR; 8 RBI; 1.319 OPS	Sean Murphy	Atlanta Braves	.360 (9–25); 5 Runs; 3 HR; 12 RBI; 1.275 OPS
May 8 – May 14	Anthony Rizzo	New York Yankees	.444 (12–27); 10 Runs; 3 HR; 7 RBI; 1.315 OPS	Mitch Keller	Pittsburgh Pirates	2–0; 0.00 ERA; 16 IP; K/BB 21/1; .146 BAA; SHO
May 15 – May 21	Aaron Judge	New York Yankees	.500 (11–22); 7 Runs; 5 HR; 11 RBI; 1.893 OPS	Nolan Gorman	St. Louis Cardinals	.458 (11–24); 5 Runs; 4 HR; 11 RBI; 1.519 OPS
May 22 – May 28	Julio Rodríguez	Seattle Mariners	.467 (14–30); 6 Runs; 2 HR; 7 RBI; 1.284 OPS	Matt McLain	Cincinnati Reds	.484 (15–31); 9 Runs; 2 HR; 7 RBI; 1.317 OPS
May 29 – June 4	Corey Seager	Texas Rangers	.407 (11–27); 7 Runs; 2 HR; 10 RBI; 1.169 OPS	Marcus Stroman	Chicago Cubs	2–0; 0.00 ERA; 15 IP; K/BB 14/4; .100 BAA; SHO
June 5 – June 11	Gunnar Henderson	Baltimore Orioles	.526 (10–19); 5 Runs; 3 HR; 6 RBI; 1.603 OPS	Corbin Carroll	Arizona Diamondbacks	.500 (11–22); 9 Runs; 3 HR; 8 RBI; 1.633 OPS
June 12 – June 18	Shohei Ohtani	Los Angeles Angels	.435 (10–23); 9 Runs; 6 HR; 12 RBI; 1.893 OPS; 1–0; 3.00 ERA; 6 IP; K/BB 3/1; .240 BAA	Michael Harris II	Atlanta Braves	.556 (15–27); 8 Runs; 3 HR; 9 RBI; 1.499 OPS
June 19 – June 25	Luis Robert Jr.	Chicago White Sox	.444 (8–18); 6 Runs; 4 HR; 5 RBI; 1.635 OPS	Elly De La Cruz	Cincinnati Reds	.440 (11–25); 8 Runs; 2 HR; 5 RBI; 1.342 OPS; hit for cycle
June 26 – July 2	Domingo Germán	New York Yankees	24th perfect game in Major League history; 9 strikeouts	Ronald Acuña Jr.	Atlanta Braves	.474 (9–19); 9 Runs; 5 HR; 7 RBI; 1.916 OPS
June 26 – July 2	Shohei Ohtani	Los Angeles Angels	.417 (10–24); 9 Runs; 6 HR; 7 RBI; 1.783 OPS; 1–0; 1.42 ERA; 6.1 IP; K/BB 10/2; .182 BAA	Ronald Acuña Jr.	Atlanta Braves	.474 (9–19); 9 Runs; 5 HR; 7 RBI; 1.916 OPS
July 3 – July 9	Logan Gilbert	Seattle Mariners	2–0; 0.56 ERA; 16 IP; K/BB 13/0; .146 BAA; SHO	Manny Machado	San Diego Padres	.478 (11–23); 8 Runs; 4 HR; 13 RBI; 1.599 OPS
July 14 – July 16	Chas McCormick	Houston Astros	.636 (7–11); 7 Runs; 3 HR; 5 RBI; 2.188 OPS	CJ Abrams	Washington Nationals	.462 (6–13); 7 Runs; 1 HR; 1 RBI; 2 SB; 1.385 OPS
July 17 – July 23	Alex Kirilloff	Minnesota Twins	.345 (10–29); 5 Runs; 3 HR; 10 RBI; 1.187 OPS	Austin Riley	Atlanta Braves	.400 (10–25); 9 Runs; 6 HR; 16 RBI; 1.640 OPS
July 24 – July 30	Shohei Ohtani	Los Angeles Angels	.300 (6–20); 6 Runs; 3 HR; 4 RBI; 1.282 OPS; 1–0; 0.00 ERA; 9 IP; K/BB 8/3; .038 BAA; SHO	Pete Alonso	New York Mets	.304 (7–23); 5 Runs; 4 HR; 12 RBI; 1.197 OPS
July 31 – August 6	Framber Valdez	Houston Astros	1–0; 0.00 ERA; 9 IP; K/BB 7/1; no-hitter	Freddie Freeman	Los Angeles Dodgers	.500 (13–26); 8 Runs; 2 HR; 7 RBI; 1.459 OPS
August 7 – August 13	Jose Altuve	Houston Astros	.520 (13–25); 9 runs; 1 HR; 6 RBI; 1.373 OPS	Michael Lorenzen	Philadelphia Phillies	1–0; 0.00 ERA; 9 IP; K/BB: 5/4; no-hitter
August 7 – August 13	Jose Altuve	Houston Astros	.520 (13–25); 9 runs; 1 HR; 6 RBI; 1.373 OPS	Matt Olson	Atlanta Braves	.400 (12–30); 10 runs; 4 HR; 10 RBI; 1.372 OPS
August 14 – August 20	Julio Rodríguez	Seattle Mariners	.568 (21–37); 7 runs; 2 HR; 12 RBI; 6 SB; 1.417 OPS	Eddie Rosario	Atlanta Braves	.524 (11–21); 6 runs; 3 HR; 10 RBI; 1.631 OPS
August 21 – August 27	Adam Duvall	Boston Red Sox	.483 (14–29); 7 runs; 5 HR; 12 RBI; 1.689 OPS	Mookie Betts	Los Angeles Dodgers	.615 (16–26); 9 runs; 1 HR; 7 RBI; 1.540 OPS
August 28 – September 3	Luis Rengifo	Los Angeles Angels	.440 (11–25); 3 runs; 3 HR; 7 RBI; 1.207 OPS	Trea Turner	Philadelphia Phillies	.423 (11–26); 9 runs; 6 HR; 14 RBI; 1.695 OPS
September 4 – September 10	Jose Altuve	Houston Astros	.357 (10–28); 9 runs; 6 HR; 8 RBI; 1.400 OPS	Matt Olson	Atlanta Braves	.546 (12–22); 8 runs; 4 HR; 8 RBI; 1.766 OPS
September 11 – September 17	Rafael Devers	Boston Red Sox	.400 (8–20); 5 runs; 4 HR; 5 RBI; 1.586 OPS	Juan Soto	San Diego Padres	.458 (11–24); 9 runs; 4 HR; 13 RBI; 1.500 OPS
September 18 – September 24	Aaron Judge	New York Yankees	.529 (9–17); 4 runs; 3 HR; 8 RBI; 1.854 OPS	J. D. Martinez	Los Angeles Dodgers	.458 (11–24); 6 runs; 5 HR; 12 RBI; 1.708 OPS
September 25 – October 1	Justin Verlander	Houston Astros	2–0; 0.69 ERA; 13 IP; K/BB: 13/4; .116 BAA	Nolan Jones	Colorado Rockies	.429 (12–28); 4 runs; 2 HR; 7 RBI; 1.163 OPS

== 2022 ==
Week	American League			National League		
Week	Player(s)	Team(s)	Highlights	Player(s)	Team(s)	Highlights
April 7 – April 10	Alex Bregman	Houston Astros	.429 (6–14); 4 runs; 2 HR; 6 RBI; 1.286 OPS	Nolan Arenado	St. Louis Cardinals	.500 (6–12); 4 runs; 2 HR; 7 RBI; 1.789 OPS
April 11 – April 17	José Ramírez	Cleveland Guardians	.478 (11–23); 3 runs; 2 HR; 11 RBI; 1.432 OPS	Seiya Suzuki	Chicago Cubs	.412 (7–17); 5 runs; 3 HR; 5 RBI; 1.604 OPS
April 18 – April 24	Miguel Cabrera	Detroit Tigers	.389 (7–18); 3 runs; 2 RBI; .839 OPS; 3,000th career hit	Cody Bellinger	Los Angeles Dodgers	.304 (7–23); 3 runs; 3 HR; 7 RBI; 1.174 OPS
April 18 – April 24	Ty France	Seattle Mariners	.500 (13–26); 7 runs; 3 HR; 10 RBI; 1.436 OPS	Cody Bellinger	Los Angeles Dodgers	.304 (7–23); 3 runs; 3 HR; 7 RBI; 1.174 OPS
April 25 – May 1	Taylor Ward	Los Angeles Angels	.448 (10–29); 10 runs; 4 HR; 11 RBI; 1.484 OPS	Willy Adames	Milwaukee Brewers	.310 (9–29); 6 runs; 4 HR; 10 RBI; 1.203 OPS
May 2 – May 8	Manuel Margot	Tampa Bay Rays	.500 (12–24); 7 runs; 3 HR; 12 RBI; 1.580 OPS	Rowdy Tellez	Milwaukee Brewers	.321 (9–28); 3 runs; 3 HR; 12 RBI; 1.107 OPS
May 9 – May 15	Reid Detmers	Los Angeles Angels	1–0; 0.00 ERA; 9 IP; K/BB: 2/1; no-hitter	Bryce Harper	Philadelphia Phillies	.609 (14–23); 8 runs; 3 HR; 8 RBI; 1.904 OPS
May 16 – May 22	Trevor Story	Boston Red Sox	.360 (9–25); 10 runs; 6 HR; 14 RBI; 1.572 OPS	Sandy Alcantara	Miami Marlins	2–0; 0.53 ERA; 17 IP; K/BB: 12/3; CG; .150 BAA
May 23 – May 29	Jose Ramirez	Cleveland Guardians	.348 (8–23); 5 runs; 3 HR; 11 RBI; 1.380 OPS	Francisco Lindor	New York Mets	.348 (8–23); 10 runs; 2 HR; 14 RBI; 1.277 OPS
May 30 – June 5	Yordan Alvarez	Houston Astros	.565 (13–23); 8 runs; 4 HR; 8 RBI; 1.847 OPS	Brendan Rodgers	Colorado Rockies	.345 (10–29); 10 runs; 4 HR; 7 RBI; 1.252 OPS
June 6 – June 12	Byron Buxton	Minnesota Twins	.333 (7–21); 8 runs; 5 HR; 7 RBI; 1.512 OPS	Hunter Greene	Cincinnati Reds	1–0; 0.75 ERA; 12 IP; K/BB: 15/2; seven-inning CG SHO (rain)
June 13 – June 19	Vladimir Guerrero Jr.	Toronto Blue Jays	.407 (11–27); 7 runs; 3 HR; 7 RBI; 1.278 OPS	Paul Goldschmidt	St. Louis Cardinals	.467 (14–30); 7 runs; 4 HR; 11 RBI; 1.482 OPS
June 20 – June 26	Isaac Paredes	Tampa Bay Rays	.579 (11–19); 6 runs; 5 HR; 9 RBI; 2.093 OPS	Freddie Freeman	Los Angeles Dodgers	.440 (11–25); 6 runs; 2 HR; 11 RBI; 1.373 OPS
June 27 – July 3	Julio Rodríguez	Seattle Mariners	.360 (9–25); 7 runs; 3 HR; 6 RBI; 1.273 OPS	Rhys Hoskins	Philadelphia Phillies	.421 (8–19); 6 runs; 4 HR; 5 RBI; 1.678 OPS
July 4 – July 10	Corey Seager	Texas Rangers	.500 (11–22); 6 runs; 4 HR; 9 RBI; 1.601 OPS	Austin Riley	Atlanta Braves	.448 (13–29); 6 runs; 3 HR; 8 RBI; 1.346 OPS
July 11 – July 17	Matt Carpenter	New York Yankees	.400 (6–15); 6 runs; 3 HR; 12 RBI; 1.683 OPS	Freddie Freeman	Los Angeles Dodgers	.632 (12–19); 5 runs; 2 HR; 5 RBI; 1.810 OPS
July 21 – July 24	Aaron Judge	New York Yankees	.474 (9–19); 6 runs; 4 HR; 11 RBI; 1.776 OPS	Paul Goldschmidt	St. Louis Cardinals	.462 (6–13); 4 runs; 4 HR; 7 RBI; 1.885 OPS
July 25 – July 31	Aaron Judge	New York Yankees	.348 (8–23); 7 runs; 5 HR; 10 RBI; 1.483 OPS	Merrill Kelly	Arizona Diamondbacks	1–0; 0.00 ERA; 15 IP; K/BB: 15/2; .125 BAA
August 1 – August 7	Kevin Gausman	Toronto Blue Jays	1–0; 0.00 ERA; 14 IP; K/BB: 15/1; .146 BAA	Nolan Arenado	St. Louis Cardinals	.476 (10–21); 8 runs; 3 HR; 8 RBI; 1.560 OPS
August 8 – August 14	Vinnie Pasquantino	Kansas City Royals	.455 (10–22); 6 runs; 4 HR; 6 RBI; 1.546 OPS	Manny Machado	San Diego Padres	.429 (12–28); 7 runs; 2 HR; 10 RBI; 1.270 OPS
August 15 – August 21	Johnny Cueto	Chicago White Sox	2–0; 0.54 ERA; 16.2 IP; K/BB: 5/2; .183 BAA	Paul Goldschmidt	St. Louis Cardinals	.542 (13–24); 7 runs; 3 HR; 11 RBI; 1.613 OPS
August 15 – August 21	Johnny Cueto	Chicago White Sox	2–0; 0.54 ERA; 16.2 IP; K/BB: 5/2; .183 BAA	Albert Pujols	St. Louis Cardinals	.615 (8–13); 3 runs; 3 HR; 7 RBI; 1.974 OPS
August 22 – August 28	Nathaniel Lowe	Texas Rangers	.385 (10–26); 6 runs; 4 HR; 11 RBI; 1.331 OPS	Mookie Betts	Los Angeles Dodgers	.346 (9–26); 9 runs; 4 HR; 7 RBI; 1.337 OPS
August 29 – September 4	Xander Bogaerts	Boston Red Sox	.536 (15–28); 8 runs; 1 HR; 9 RBI; 1.402 OPS; multiple hits in every game	Zac Gallen	Arizona Diamondbacks	2–0; 0.00 ERA; 14 IP; K/BB: 14/2; .091 BAA
September 5 – September 11	Bo Bichette	Toronto Blue Jays	.500 (16–32); 11 runs; 5 HR; 13 RBI; 1.686 OPS	Freddie Freeman	Los Angeles Dodgers	.546 (12–22); 7 runs; 3 HR; 8 RBI; 1.638 OPS
September 12 – September 18	Yordan Alvarez	Houston Astros	.520 (13–25); 10 runs; 5 HR; 10 RBI; 1.836 OPS	Yu Darvish	San Diego Padres	2–0; 0.00 ERA; 14 IP; K/BB: 15/1; .067 BAA
September 19 – September 25	Steven Kwan	Cleveland Guardians	.438 (14–32); 9 runs; 2 HR; 10 RBI; 4 SB; 1.221 OPS	Pete Alonso	New York Mets	.333 (8–24); 9 runs; 4 HR; 13 RBI; 1.324 OPS
September 19 – September 25	Steven Kwan	Cleveland Guardians	.438 (14–32); 9 runs; 2 HR; 10 RBI; 4 SB; 1.221 OPS	Albert Pujols	St. Louis Cardinals	.368 (7–19); 3 runs; 2 HR; 5 RBI; 1.084 OPS; 700th career home run
September 26 – October 5	Aaron Judge	New York Yankees	.231 (6–26); 8 runs; 2 HR; 3 RBI; .949 OPS; AL record 62nd home run	Matt Olson	Atlanta Braves	.375 (12–32); 9 runs; 6 HR; 11 RBI; 1.416 OPS
September 26 – October 5	J. D. Martinez	Boston Red Sox	.353 (12–34); 9 runs; 4 HR; 7 RBI; 1.183 OPS	Matt Olson	Atlanta Braves	.375 (12–32); 9 runs; 6 HR; 11 RBI; 1.416 OPS

== 2021 ==
Week	American League			National League		
Week	Player(s)	Team(s)	Highlights	Player(s)	Team(s)	Highlights
April 1 – April 4	Yermin Mercedes	Chicago White Sox	.643 (9–14); 2 Runs; 1 HR; 6 RBI; 1.643 OPS; MLB-record eight straight hits to start season	Eric Hosmer	San Diego Padres	.636 (7–11); 3 Runs; 2 HR; 6 RBI; 2.030 OPS
April 5 – April 11	J. D. Martinez	Boston Red Sox	.458 (11–24); 8 Runs; 4 HR; 13 RBI; 1.625 OPS	Joe Musgrove	San Diego Padres	1–0; 0.00 ERA; 9 IP; K/BB: 10/0; no-hitter
April 12 – April 18	Carlos Rodón	Chicago White Sox	1–0; 0.00 ERA; 9 IP; K/BB: 7/0; no-hitter	Ronald Acuña Jr.	Atlanta Braves	.385 (10–26); 13 Runs; 3 HR; 8 RBI; 1.361 OPS
April 19 – April 25	Adolis Garcia	Texas Rangers	.333 (8–24); 5 Runs; 4 HR; 9 RBI; 1.260 OPS	Madison Bumgarner	Arizona Diamondbacks	1–0; 0.00 ERA; 7 IP; K/BB: 7/0; seven inning no-hitter
April 19 – April 25	Adolis Garcia	Texas Rangers	.333 (8–24); 5 Runs; 4 HR; 9 RBI; 1.260 OPS	Fernando Tatis Jr.	San Diego Padres	.385 (10–26); 9 Runs; 5 HR; 7 RBI; 1.467 OPS
April 26 – May 2	Corey Kluber	New York Yankees	2–0; 0.61 ERA; 14.2 IP; K/BB: 15/3; BAA: .157	Kris Bryant	Chicago Cubs	.417 (10–24); 6 Runs; 4 HR; 10 RBI; 1.542 OPS
May 3 – May 9	John Means	Baltimore Orioles	1–0; 0.00 ERA; 9 IP; K/BB: 12/0; no-hitter	Wade Miley	Cincinnati Reds	1–0; 0.00 ERA; 9 IP; K/BB: 8/1; no-hitter
May 10 – May 16	Aaron Judge	New York Yankees	.571 (12–21); 8 Runs; 5 HR; 6 RBI; 1.973 OPS	Josh Fuentes	Colorado Rockies	.500 (11–22); 6 Runs; 2 HR; 13 RBI; 1.431 OPS
May 17 – May 23	Corey Kluber	New York Yankees	1–0; 0.00 ERA; 9 IP; K/BB: 9/1; no-hitter	Austin Riley	Atlanta Braves	.462 (12–26); 9 Runs; 6 HR; 11 RBI; 1.772 OPS
May 17 – May 23	Spencer Turnbull	Detroit Tigers	1–0; 0.00 ERA; 9 IP; K/BB: 9/2; no-hitter	Austin Riley	Atlanta Braves	.462 (12–26); 9 Runs; 6 HR; 11 RBI; 1.772 OPS
May 24 – May 30	Jose Abreu	Chicago White Sox	.375 (9–24); 4 Runs; 2 HR; 10 RBI; 1.191 OPS	Brandon Woodruff	Milwaukee Brewers	2–0; 0.00 ERA; 14 IP; K/BB: 18/2; BAA: .109
May 31 – June 6	Ryan Mountcastle	Baltimore Orioles	.458 (11–24); 7 Runs; 4 HR; 10 RBI; 1.563 OPS	Patrick Wisdom	Chicago Cubs	.435 (10–23); 7 Runs; 6 HR; 9 RBI; 1.719 OPS
June 7 – June 13	Max Stassi	Los Angeles Angels	.455 (10–22); 9 Runs; 3 HR; 8 RBI; 1.478 OPS	Starling Marte	Miami Marlins	.500 (14–28); 8 Runs; 2 HR; 5 RBI; 4 SB; 1.298 OPS
June 14 – June 20	Shohei Ohtani	Los Angeles Angels	.296 (8–27); 6 Runs; 6 HR; 9 RBI; 1.350 OPS; 1–0; 1.50 ERA; 6 IP; K/BB: 5/1; BAA: .238	Kyle Schwarber	Washington Nationals	.385 (7–29); 7 Runs; 6 HR; 11 RBI; 1.491 OPS
June 21 – June 27	Vladimir Guerrero Jr.	Toronto Blue Jays	.391 (9–23); 8 Runs; 3 HR; 7 RBI; 1.308 OPS	Jake Cronenworth	San Diego Padres	.391 (9–23); 7 Runs; 4 HR; 9 RBI; 1.481 OPS
June 28 – July 4	Shohei Ohtani	Los Angeles Angels	.286 (6–21); 8 Runs; 6 HR; 8 RBI; 1.543 OPS; 0–0; 94.50 ERA; 0.2 IP; K/BB: 1/4; BAA: .500	Ozzie Albies	Atlanta Braves	.400 (10–25); 6 Runs; 3 HR; 13 RBI; 1.167 OPS
July 5 – July 11	David Fletcher	Los Angeles Angels	.593 (16–27); 5 Runs; 2 HR; 7 RBI; 1.481 OPS	A. J. Pollock	Los Angeles Dodgers	.391 (9–23); 6 Runs; 4 HR; 4 RBI; 1.505 OPS
July 16 – July 18	Mitch Haniger	Seattle Mariners	.455 (5–11); 7 Runs; 2 HR; 6 RBI; 1.624 OPS	Willy Adames	Milwaukee Brewers	.615 (8–13); 6 Runs; 2 HR; 7 RBI; 1.841 OPS
July 19 – July 25	Kiké Hernández	Boston Red Sox	.400 (10–25); 8 Runs; 3 HR; 9 RBI; 1.448 OPS	Chris Taylor	Los Angeles Dodgers	.414 (12–29); 9 Runs; 5 HR; 6 RBI; 1.433 OPS
July 26 – August 1	George Springer	Toronto Blue Jays	.400 (10–25); 8 Runs; 3 HR; 7 RBI; 1.476 OPS	Joey Votto	Cincinnati Reds	.375 (9–24); 8 Runs; 7 HR; 11 RBI; 1.698 OPS
August 2 – August 8	George Springer	Toronto Blue Jays	.364 (12–33); 9 Runs; 3 HR; 11 RBI; 1.177 OPS	C. J. Cron	Colorado Rockies	.556 (10–18); 9 Runs; 4 HR; 16 RBI; 1.914 OPS
August 9 – August 15	Teoscar Hernández	Toronto Blue Jays	.500 (14–28); 8 Runs; 3 HR; 10 RBI; 1.393 OPS	Tyler Gilbert	Arizona Diamondbacks	1–0; 0.00 ERA; 9 IP; K/BB: 5/3; no-hitter in first career start
August 16 – August 22	Luke Voit	New York Yankees	.476 (10–21); 5 Runs; 2 HR; 11 RBI; 1.427 OPS	Tyler Naquin	Cincinnati Reds	.500 (13–26); 9 Runs; 4 HR; 5 RBI; 1.706 OPS
August 23 – August 29	Salvador Perez	Kansas City Royals	.357 (10–28); 6 Runs; 6 HR; 14 RBI; 1.455 OPS	Tommy Edman	St. Louis Cardinals	.462 (12–26); 7 Runs; 2 HR; 10 RBI; 1.290 OPS
August 30 – September 5	Robbie Ray	Toronto Blue Jays	2–0; 1.32 ERA; 13.2 IP; K/BB: 20/4; BAA: .111	Frank Schwindel	Chicago Cubs	.462 (12–26); 7 Runs; 5 HR; 12 RBI; 1.538 OPS
September 6 – September 12	Andrew Benintendi	Kansas City Royals	.500 (14–28); 4 Runs; 3 HR; 14 RBI; 1.445 OPS	Max Scherzer	Los Angeles Dodgers	2–0; 0.00 ERA; 16 IP; K/BB: 22/0; 3,000th career strikeout
September 13 – September 19	José Ramírez	Cleveland Indians	.500 (10–20); 10 Runs; 2 HR; 7 RBI; 1.460 OPS	Tyler O'Neill	St. Louis Cardinals	.391 (9–23); 9 Runs; 3 HR; 10 RBI; 1.308 OPS
September 20 – September 26	Giancarlo Stanton	New York Yankees	.409 (9–22); 4 Runs; 4 HR; 13 RBI; 1.440 OPS	Harrison Bader	St. Louis Cardinals	.517 (15–29); 10 Runs; 3 HR; 6 RBI; 1.548 OPS
September 27 – October 3	George Springer	Toronto Blue Jays	.500 (13–26); 8 Runs; 3 HR; 10 RBI; 1.497 OPS	Trea Turner	Los Angeles Dodgers	.458 (11–24); 8 Runs; 3 HR; 11 RBI; 1.397 OPS

== 2020 ==
Week	American League			National League		
Week	Player(s)	Team(s)	Highlights	Player(s)	Team(s)	Highlights
July 23 – July 26	Nelson Cruz	Minnesota Twins	.538 (7–13); 7 Runs; 3 HR; 10 RBI; 1.956 OPS	Kyle Hendricks	Chicago Cubs	1–0; 0.00 ERA; 9 IP; K/BB: 9/0; .100 BAA; SHO
July 27 – August 2	Aaron Judge	New York Yankees	.368 (7–19); 9 Runs; 6 HR; 13 RBI; 1.794 OPS	Nick Castellanos	Cincinnati Reds	.429 (9–21); 7 Runs; 4 HR; 10 RBI; 1.595 OPS
August 3 – August 9	Frankie Montas	Oakland Athletics	2–0; 0.64 ERA; 14 IP; K/BB: 14/4; .125 BAA	Fernando Tatis Jr.	San Diego Padres	.435 (10–23); 7 Runs; 6 HR; 9 RBI; 1.741 OPS
August 10 – August 16	Brandon Lowe	Tampa Bay Rays	.448 (13–29); 10 Runs; 4 HR; 10 RBI; 1.500 OPS	Juan Soto	Washington Nationals	.462 (12–26); 12 Runs; 5 HR; 12 RBI; 1.610 OPS
August 17 – August 23	Jose Abreu	Chicago White Sox	.533 (16–30); 9 Runs; 7 HR; 15 RBI; 1.896 OPS; home run in four consecutive at-bats	Manny Machado	San Diego Padres	.393 (11–28); 8 Runs; 3 HR; 9 RBI; 1.290 OPS
August 24 – August 30	Lucas Giolito	Chicago White Sox	1–0; 0.00 ERA; 9 IP; K/BB: 13/1; no-hitter	Manny Machado	San Diego Padres	.538 (14–26); 8 Runs; 3 HR; 7 RBI; 1.519 OPS
August 31 – September 6	Lourdes Gurriel Jr.	Toronto Blue Jays	.467 (14–30); 5 Runs; 2 HR; 6 RBI; 1.282 OPS	Marcell Ozuna	Atlanta Braves	.464 (13–28); 8 Runs; 5 HR; 13 RBI; 1.674 OPS
September 7 – September 13	Jeimer Candelario	Detroit Tigers	.423 (11–26); 8 Runs; 3 HR; 9 RBI; 1.423 OPS	Alec Mills	Chicago Cubs	2–0; 0.00 ERA; 15 IP; K/BB: 11/6; .085 BAA; no-hitter
September 14 – September 20	DJ LeMahieu	New York Yankees	.423 (11–26); 9 Runs; 4 HR; 10 RBI; 1.555 OPS	Kole Calhoun	Arizona Diamondbacks	.458 (11–24); 7 Runs; 6 HR; 12 RBI; 1.750 OPS
September 21 – September 27	Adalberto Mondesi	Kansas City Royals	.615 (16–26); 10 Runs; 2 HR; 8 RBI; 5 SB; 8 XBH; 1.809 OPS	Marcell Ozuna	Atlanta Braves	.500 (13–26); 7 Runs; 3 HR; 8 RBI; 1.529 OPS

== 2019 ==
Week	American League			National League		
Week	Player(s)	Team(s)	Highlights	Player(s)	Team(s)	Highlights
March 28 – March 31	Tim Beckham	Seattle Mariners	.435 (10–23); 8 Runs; 3 HR; 6 RBI; 1.432 OPS (includes two games in Japan Series)	Christian Yelich	Milwaukee Brewers	.500 (6–12); 6 Runs; 4 HR; 8 RBI; 2.250 OPS
April 1 – April 7	Mike Trout	Los Angeles Angels	.438 (7–16); 5 Runs; 5 HR; 9 RBI; 2.029 OPS	Cody Bellinger	Los Angeles Dodgers	.417 (10–24); 10 Runs; 3 HR; 10 RBI; 1.420 OPS
April 8 – April 14	Austin Meadows	Tampa Bay Rays	.545 (12–22); 6 Runs; 4 HR; 12 RBI; 1.811 OPS	Ronald Acuña Jr.	Atlanta Braves	.545 (12–22); 7 Runs; 3 HR; 9 RBI; 1.721 OPS
April 15 – April 21	Joey Gallo	Texas Rangers	.478 (11–23); 8 Runs; 4 HR; 11 RBI; 1.654 OPS	Christian Yelich	Milwaukee Brewers	.417 (10–24); 9 Runs; 8 HR; 16 RBI; 1.950 OPS
April 22 – April 28	Luke Voit	New York Yankees	.433 (13–30); 10 Runs; 4 HR; 10 RBI; 1.394 OPS	Eduardo Escobar	Arizona Diamondbacks	.480 (12–25); 8 Runs; 3 HR; 8 RBI; 1.573 OPS
April 29 – May 5	Jake Odorizzi	Minnesota Twins	2–0; 0.00 ERA; 13 IP; K/BB: 15/5; .136 BAA	Noah Syndergaard	New York Mets	1–0; 0.00 ERA; 9 IP; K/BB: 10/1; .133 BAA; SHO; hit home run in 1–0 win
May 6 – May 12	Mike Fiers	Oakland Athletics	1–0; 0.00 ERA; 9 IP; K/BB: 6/2; second career no-hitter	Hyun-Jin Ryu	Los Angeles Dodgers	2–0; 0.00 ERA; 17 IP; K/BB: 15/1; .091 BAA; SHO
May 6 – May 12	George Springer	Houston Astros	.519 (14–27); 10 Runs; 5 HR; 10 RBI; 1.711 OPS	Hyun-Jin Ryu	Los Angeles Dodgers	2–0; 0.00 ERA; 17 IP; K/BB: 15/1; .091 BAA; SHO
May 13 – May 19	Vladimir Guerrero Jr.	Toronto Blue Jays	.333 (7–21); 5 Runs; 4 HR; 9 RBI; 1.321 OPS	Josh Bell	Pittsburgh Pirates	.407 (11–27); 6 Runs; 4 HR; 10 RBI; 1.373 OPS
May 20 – May 26	Max Kepler	Minnesota Twins	.571 (12–21); 10 Runs; 3 HR; 10 RBI; 1.790 OPS	Nolan Arenado	Colorado Rockies	.538 (14–26); 7 Runs; 4 HR; 9 RBI; 1.632 OPS
May 27 – June 2	Lucas Giolito	Chicago White Sox	2–0; 1.76 ERA; 15.1 IP; K/BB: 19/1; .154 BAA	Trevor Story	Colorado Rockies	.524 (11–21); 9 Runs; 2 HR; 7 RBI; 1.631 OPS
June 3 – June 9	Marcus Semien	Oakland Athletics	.419 (13–31); 7 Runs; 2 HR; 9 RBI; 1.148 OPS	Jay Bruce	Philadelphia Phillies	.381 (8–21); 6 Runs; 4 HR; 11 RBI; 1.429 OPS
June 10 – June 16	Trevor Bauer	Cleveland Indians	1–0; 0.54 ERA; 16.2 IP; K/BB: 14/5; .175 BAA; SHO	Charlie Blackmon	Colorado Rockies	.568 (21–37); 12 Runs; 6 HR; 15 RBI; 1.784 OPS; MLB record 15 hits in four-game series
June 17 – June 23	Mike Trout	Los Angeles Angels	.483 (14–29); 7 Runs; 3 HR; 10 RBI; 1.421 OPS	Pete Alonso	New York Mets	.417 (10–24); 7 Runs; 4 HR; 8 RBI; 1.590 OPS
June 24 – June 30	DJ LeMahieu	New York Yankees	.625 (15–24); 8 Runs; 2 HR; 10 RBI; 1.737 OPS	Max Scherzer	Washington Nationals	2–0; 1.13 ERA; 16 IP; K/BB: 24/0; .161 BAA
July 1 – July 7	Yuli Gurriel	Houston Astros	.429 (9–21); 8 Runs; 6 HR; 13 RBI; 1.812 OPS	Adam Frazier	Pittsburgh Pirates	.600 (18–30); 11 Runs; 7 2B; 1 HR; 7 RBI; 1.558 OPS
July 11 – July 14	Nate Lowe	Tampa Bay Rays	.471 (8–17); 6 Runs; 3 HR; 7 RBI; 1.559 OPS	Daniel Murphy	Colorado Rockies	.667 (8–12); 5 Runs; 2 HR; 5 RBI; 2.109 OPS
July 15 – July 21	Ramón Laureano	Oakland Athletics	.542 (13–24); 10 Runs; 6 2B; 2 HR; 2 RBI; 1.619 OPS	Keston Hiura	Milwaukee Brewers	.517 (15–29); 7 Runs; 9 XBH; 1 HR; 8 RBI; 1.514 OPS
July 22 – July 28	Nelson Cruz	Minnesota Twins	.414 (12–29); 10 Runs; 7 HR; 13 RBI; 1.657 OPS	Paul Goldschmidt	St. Louis Cardinals	.345 (10–29); 9 Runs; 6 HR; 13 RBI; 1.353 OPS
July 29 – August 4	Vladimir Guerrero Jr.	Toronto Blue Jays	.500 (13–26); 5 Runs; 3 HR; 11 RBI; 1.497 OPS	Noah Syndergaard	New York Mets	1–0; 0.63 ERA; 14.1 IP; K/BB: 14/2; .157 BAA
August 5 – August 11	Jorge Soler	Kansas City Royals	.409 (9–22); 10 Runs; 6 HR; 12 RBI; 1.824 OPS	Aristides Aquino	Cincinnati Reds	.500 (11–22); 8 Runs; 6 HR; 11 RBI; 1.905 OPS
August 12 – August 18	Rafael Devers	Boston Red Sox	.593 (16–27); 7 Runs; 3 HR; 11 RBI; 1.819 OPS	Nick Ahmed	Arizona Diamondbacks	.423 (11–26); 5 Runs; 4 HR; 11 RBI; 1.503 OPS
August 19 – August 25	Mark Canha	Oakland Athletics	.474 (9–19); 5 Runs; 4 HR; 7 RBI; 1.682 OPS	Anthony Rendon	Washington Nationals	.483 (14–29); 6 Runs; 2 HR; 7 RBI; 1.336 OPS
August 26 – September 1	Justin Verlander	Houston Astros	2–0; 0.00 ERA; 14.1 IP; K/BB: 18/1; .085 BAA; third career no-hitter	Yadier Molina	St. Louis Cardinals	.579 (11–19); 7 Runs; 4 HR; 8 RBI; 2.005 OPS
September 2 – September 8	Austin Meadows	Tampa Bay Rays	.522 (12–23); 9 Runs; 4 HR; 8 RBI; 1.723 OPS	Ketel Marte	Arizona Diamondbacks	.542 (13–24); 6 Runs; 4 HR; 14 RBI; 1.785 OPS
September 9 – September 15	Eloy Jimenez	Chicago White Sox	.435 (10–23); 6 Runs; 3 HR; 11 RBI; 1.370 OPS	Kris Bryant	Chicago Cubs	.500 (11–22); 8 Runs; 5 HR; 13 RBI; 1.720 OPS
September 16 – September 22	Trey Mancini	Baltimore Orioles	.462 (12–26); 4 Runs; 2 HR; 10 RBI; 1.330 OPS	Corey Seager	Los Angeles Dodgers	.500 (10–20); 5 Runs; 2 HR; 7 RBI; 1.524 OPS
September 23 – September 29	Gerrit Cole	Houston Astros	2–0; 0.75 ERA; 12.0 IP; K/BB: 24/2; .143 BAA	Ian Happ	Chicago Cubs	.455 (10–22); 6 Runs; 4 HR; 10 RBI; 1.636 OPS

== 2018 ==
Week	American League			National League		
Week	Player(s)	Team(s)	Highlights	Player(s)	Team(s)	Highlights
March 29 – April 1	Justin Smoak	Toronto Blue Jays	.368 (7–19); 2 Runs; 2 HR; 8 RBI; 1.218 OPS	Adam Eaton	Washington Nationals	.615 (8–13); 7 Runs; 2 HR; 5 RBI; 1.874 OPS
April 2 – April 8	Shohei Ohtani	Los Angeles Angels	.462 (6–13); 4 Runs; 3 HR; 7 RBI; 1.654 OPS; 1–0; 0.00 ERA; 7 IP; K/BB: 12/1; .045 BAA	Jameson Taillon	Pittsburgh Pirates	1–0; 0.00 ERA; 9 IP; K/BB: 7/2; .037 BAA; SHO
April 9 – April 15	Justin Verlander	Houston Astros	1–0; 0.60 ERA; 15 IP; K/BB: 20/2; .100 BAA	Max Scherzer	Washington Nationals	2–0; 1.13 ERA; 16 IP; K/BB: 21/1; .060 BAA; SHO
April 16 – April 22	Sean Manaea	Oakland Athletics	1–0; 0.00 ERA; 9 IP; K/BB: 10/2; no-hitter	Patrick Corbin	Arizona Diamondbacks	2–0; 1.20 ERA; 15 IP; K/BB: 19/2; .061 BAA; SHO
April 16 – April 22	Manny Machado	Baltimore Orioles	.500 (11–22); 7 Runs; 5 HR; 8 RBI; 1.833 OPS	Patrick Corbin	Arizona Diamondbacks	2–0; 1.20 ERA; 15 IP; K/BB: 19/2; .061 BAA; SHO
April 23 – April 29	Didi Gregorius	New York Yankees	.357 (10–28); 7 Runs; 4 HR; 10 RBI; 1.241 OPS	Joey Votto	Cincinnati Reds	.360 (9–25); 7 Runs; 4 HR; 8 RBI; 1.423 OPS
April 30 – May 6	Francisco Lindor	Cleveland Indians	.425 (17–40); 11 Runs; 4 HR; 10 RBI; 1.264 OPS	A.J. Pollock	Arizona Diamondbacks	.423 (11–26); 5 Runs; 4 HR; 8 RBI; 1.448 OPS
May 7 – May 13	Francisco Lindor	Cleveland Indians	.600 (12–20); 8 Runs; 4 HR; 5 RBI; 2.052 OPS	Scooter Gennett	Cincinnati Reds	.591 (13–22); 7 Runs; 4 HR; 10 RBI; 1.818 OPS
May 7 – May 13	James Paxton	Seattle Mariners	1–0; 1.80 ERA; 15 IP; K/BB: 11/3; .120 BAA; no-hitter	Scooter Gennett	Cincinnati Reds	.591 (13–22); 7 Runs; 4 HR; 10 RBI; 1.818 OPS
May 14 – May 20	J. D. Martinez	Boston Red Sox	.346 (9–26); 7 Runs; 5 HR; 8 RBI; 1.414 OPS	Brandon Belt	San Francisco Giants	.444 (12–27); 8 Runs; 5 HR; 11 RBI; 1.574 OPS
May 21 – May 27	Gleyber Torres	New York Yankees	.368 (7–19); 5 Runs; 5 HR; 9 RBI; 1.586 OPS	Scooter Gennett	Cincinnati Reds	.500 (12–24); 6 Runs; 3 HR; 10 RBI; 1.477 OPS
May 28 – June 3	Edwin Encarnacion	Cleveland Indians	.407 (11–27); 9 Runs; 5 HR; 13 RBI; 1.485 OPS	Matt Kemp	Los Angeles Dodgers	.429 (9–21); 6 Runs; 3 HR; 8 RBI; 1.411 OPS
June 4 – June 10	Eduardo Escobar	Minnesota Twins	.462 (12–26); 2 Runs; 6 2B, 2 HR; 8 RBI; 1.500 OPS	Paul Goldschmidt	Arizona Diamondbacks	.640 (16–25); 10 Runs; 4 HR; 11 RBI; 2.130 OPS
June 11 – June 17	Evan Gattis	Houston Astros	.417 (10–24); 6 Runs; 4 HR; 15 RBI; 1.423 OPS	Marcell Ozuna	St. Louis Cardinals	.455 (10–22); 4 Runs; 4 HR; 8 RBI; 1.478 OPS
June 18 – June 24	Nelson Cruz	Seattle Mariners	.500 (12–24); 8 Runs; 3 HR; 8 RBI; 1.580 OPS	Nolan Arenado	Colorado Rockies	.379 (11–29); 7 Runs; 5 HR; 13 RBI; 1.385 OPS
June 25 – July 1	Alex Bregman	Houston Astros	.464 (13–28); 7 Runs; 5 HR; 10 RBI; 1.695 OPS	Javier Baez	Chicago Cubs	.483 (14–29); 10 Runs; 2 HR; 11 RBI; 1.363 OPS
July 2 – July 8	Xander Bogaerts	Boston Red Sox	.400 (6–15); 6 Runs; 2 HR; 10 RBI; 1.533 OPS	Mark Reynolds	Washington Nationals	.625 (10–16); 7 Runs; 3 HR; 12 RBI; 1.997 OPS
July 9 – July 15	Jose Ramirez	Cleveland Indians	.423 (11–26); 8 Runs; 5 HR; 11 RBI; 1.598 OPS	Trevor Story	Colorado Rockies	.400 (10–25); 5 Runs; 3 HR; 6 RBI; 1.303 OPS
July 19 – July 22	Rougned Odor	Texas Rangers	.615 (8–13); 2 Runs; 1 HR; 3 RBI; 1.418 OPS	Matt Carpenter	St. Louis Cardinals	.529 (9–17); 8 Runs; 6 HR; 10 RBI; 2.325 OPS
July 23 – July 29	Jonathan Schoop	Baltimore Orioles	.379 (11–29); 6 Runs; 5 HR; 13 RBI; 1.310 OPS	Christian Yelich	Milwaukee Brewers	.517 (15–29); 8 Runs; 3 HR; 10 RBI; 1.548 OPS
July 30 – August 5	Rougned Odor	Texas Rangers	.304 (7–23); 8 Runs; 4 HR; 10 RBI; 1.318 OPS	Matt Carpenter	St. Louis Cardinals	.423 (11–26); 7 Runs; 4 HR; 7 RBI; 1.504 OPS
August 6 – August 12	J. D. Martinez	Boston Red Sox	.464 (13–28); 7 Runs; 4 HR; 11 RBI; 1.603 OPS	Ryan Zimmerman	Washington Nationals	.476 (10–21); 4 Runs; 3 HR; 12 RBI; 1.586 OPS
August 13 – August 19	Nicholas Castellanos	Detroit Tigers	.393 (11–28); 8 Runs; 2 HR; 10 RBI; 1.199 OPS	Ronald Acuña Jr.	Atlanta Braves	.464 (13–28); 11 Runs; 4 HR; 9 RBI; 1.523 OPS
August 20 – August 26	Kendrys Morales	Toronto Blue Jays	.478 (11–23); 8 Runs; 7 HR; 12 RBI; 1.891 OPS; hit a home run in all six games	Anthony Rizzo	Chicago Cubs	.429 (9–21); 7 Runs; 3 HR; 6 RBI; 1.500 OPS
August 27 – September 2	Gleyber Torres	New York Yankees	.478 (11–23); 3 Runs; 3 HR; 10 RBI; 1.441 OPS	Christian Yelich	Milwaukee Brewers	.444 (12–27); 7 Runs; 4 HR; 14 RBI; 1.516 OPS; hit for cycle
September 3 – September 9	Shohei Ohtani	Los Angeles Angels	.474 (9–19); 8 Runs; 4 HR; 10 RBI; 1.828 OPS	Bryce Harper	Washington Nationals	.438 (7–16); 6 Runs; 2 HR; 7 RBI; 1.593 OPS
September 10 – September 16	Justin Verlander	Houston Astros	2–0; 1.93 ERA; 14 IP; K/BB: 21/2; .184 BAA	Yasiel Puig	Los Angeles Dodgers	.429 (9–21); 7 Runs; 5 HR; 9 RBI; 1.690 OPS
September 17 – September 23	Yuli Gurriel	Houston Astros	.462 (12–26); 8 Runs; 3 HR; 10 RBI; 1.385 OPS	Christian Yelich	Milwaukee Brewers	.545 (12–22); 7 Runs; 2 HR; 7 RBI; 1.706 OPS; hit for second cycle of the year
September 24 – September 30	Luke Voit	New York Yankees	.458 (11–24); 5 Runs; 3 HR; 8 RBI; 1.477 OPS	David Dahl	Colorado Rockies	.333 (10–30); 8 Runs; 6 HR; 15 RBI; 1.375 OPS

== 2017 ==
Week	American League			National League		
Week	Player(s)	Team(s)	Highlights	Player(s)	Team(s)	Highlights
April 2 – April 9	Nomar Mazara	Texas Rangers	.417 (10–24); 6 Runs; 2 HR; 9 RBI; 1.212 OPS	J. T. Realmuto	Miami Marlins	.500 (11–22); 6 Runs; 2 HR; 6 RBI; 1.451 OPS
April 10 – April 16	James Paxton	Seattle Mariners	2–0; 0.00 ERA; 15 IP; K/BB: 17/3; .122 BAA	Marcell Ozuna	Miami Marlins	.435 (10–23); 4 Runs; 4 HR; 12 RBI; 1.481 OPS
April 17 – April 23	Steven Souza Jr.	Tampa Bay Rays	.414 (12–29); 5 Runs; 2 HR; 9 RBI; 1.192 OPS	Bryce Harper	Washington Nationals	.550 (11–20); 10 Runs; 3 HR; 7 RBI; 1.867 OPS
April 24 – April 30	Miguel Sano	Minnesota Twins	.524 (11–21); 4 Runs; 3 HR; 11 RBI; 1.545 OPS	Ryan Zimmerman	Washington Nationals	.500 (13–26); 11 Runs; 5 HR; 13 RBI; 1.654 OPS
May 1 – May 7	Yonder Alonso	Oakland Athletics	.409 (9–22); 5 Runs; 5 HR; 10 RBI; 1.616 OPS	Cody Bellinger	Los Angeles Dodgers	.429 (9–21); 8 Runs; 3 HR; 12 RBI; 1.455 OPS
May 8 – May 14	Mookie Betts	Boston Red Sox	.375 (9–24); 8 Runs; 3 HR; 11 RBI; 1.399 OPS	Alex Wood	Los Angeles Dodgers	2–0; 0.00 ERA; 11 IP; K/BB: 21/2; .175 BAA
May 15 – May 21	J. D. Martinez	Detroit Tigers	.389 (7–18); 7 Runs; 4 HR; 9 RBI; 1.663 OPS	Jake Lamb	Arizona Diamondbacks	.412 (7–17); 7 Runs; 4 HR; 10 RBI; 1.742 OPS
May 22 – May 28	Jose Abreu	Chicago White Sox	.452 (14–31); 7 Runs; 2 HR; 5 RBI; 1.194 OPS	Charlie Blackmon	Colorado Rockies	.400 (12–30); 6 Runs; 3 HR; 12 RBI; 1.219 OPS
May 29 – June 4	George Springer	Houston Astros	.500 (15–30); 11 Runs; 5 HR; 9 RBI; 1.565 OPS	Edinson Volquez	Miami Marlins	2–0; 0.60 ERA; 15 IP; K/BB: 14/4; .067 BAA; no-hitter
June 5 – June 11	Aaron Judge	New York Yankees	.500 (12–24); 10 Runs; 3 HR; 6 RBI; 1.600 OPS	Scooter Gennett	Cincinnati Reds	.500 (10–20); 6 Runs; 4 HR; 13 RBI; 1.700 OPS; 4 home run game
June 12 – June 18	Jose Ramirez	Cleveland Indians	.516 (16–31); 9 Runs; 3 HR; 7 RBI; 1.610 OPS	Jacob deGrom	New York Mets	2–0; 0.53 ERA; 17 IP; K/BB: 12/6; .143 BAA; CG
June 19 – June 25	Corey Kluber	Cleveland Indians	1–0; 0.00 ERA; 16 IP; K/BB: 24/2; .109 BAA; SHO	Cody Bellinger	Los Angeles Dodgers	.370 (10–27); 7 Runs; 5 HR; 12 RBI; 1.437 OPS
June 26 – July 2	Mookie Betts	Boston Red Sox	.483 (14–29); 10 Runs; 3 HR; 11 RBI; 1.418 OPS	Joey Votto	Cincinnati Reds	.524 (11–21); 6 Runs; 3 HR; 6 RBI; 1.725 OPS
July 3 – July 9	Jose Altuve	Houston Astros	.625 (15–24); 9 Runs; 2 HR; 10 RBI; 1.625 OPS	Clayton Kershaw	Los Angeles Dodgers	2–0; 1.13 ERA; 16 IP; K/BB: 24/2; .143 BAA; CG
July 10 – July 16	J. D. Martinez	Detroit Tigers	.455 (5–11); 2 Runs; 2 HR; 7 RBI; 1.591 OPS	Anthony Rendon	Washington Nationals	.636 (7–11); 4 Runs; 3 HR; 9 RBI; 2.260 OPS
July 17 – July 23	Jonathan Schoop	Baltimore Orioles	.433 (13–30); 8 Runs; 3 HR; 16 RBI; 1.238 OPS	Nolan Arenado	Colorado Rockies	.458 (11–24); 9 Runs; 4 HR; 13 RBI; 1.480 OPS
July 24 – July 30	Adrián Beltré	Texas Rangers	.478 (11–23); 5 Runs; 1 HR; 5 RBI; 1.239 OPS; 3,000th career hit (double)	Manuel Margot	San Diego Padres	.500 (14–28); 6 Runs; 3 HR; 6 RBI; 1.464 OPS
July 24 – July 30	James Paxton	Seattle Mariners	2–0; 0.00 ERA; 13 IP; K/BB: 18/0; .208 BAA	Manuel Margot	San Diego Padres	.500 (14–28); 6 Runs; 3 HR; 6 RBI; 1.464 OPS
July 31 – August 6	Tim Beckham	Baltimore Orioles	.583 (14–24); 6 Runs; 3 HR; 6 RBI; 1.767 OPS	Willson Contreras	Chicago Cubs	.455 (10–22); 6 Runs; 5 HR; 13 RBI; 1.660 OPS
August 7 – August 13	Eddie Rosario	Minnesota Twins	.444 (12–27); 10 Runs; 4 HR; 9 RBI; 1.484 OPS	Giancarlo Stanton	Miami Marlins	.333 (9–27); 8 Runs; 6 HR; 11 RBI; 1.416 OPS
August 14 – August 20	Manny Machado	Baltimore Orioles	.385 (10–26); 4 Runs; 4 HR; 12 RBI; 1.255 OPS	Anthony Rizzo	Chicago Cubs	.429 (12–28); 5 Runs; 2 HR; 13 RBI; 1.234 OPS
August 21 – August 27	Byron Buxton	Minnesota Twins	.333 (11–33); 9 Runs; 5 HR; 10 RBI; 1.161 OPS	Giancarlo Stanton	Miami Marlins	.448 (13–29); 8 Runs; 5 HR; 11 RBI; 1.569 OPS
August 28 – September 3	Jose Ramirez	Cleveland Indians	.538 (14–26); 7 Runs; 4 HR; 6 RBI; 11 XBH; 1.863 OPS	Jeff Samardzija	San Francisco Giants	1–0; 0.56 ERA; 16 IP; K/BB: 14/2; .098 BAA; SHO
September 4 – September 10	Eric Hosmer	Kansas City Royals	.538 (14–26); 6 Runs; 2 HR; 8 RBI; 1.471 OPS	J. D. Martinez	Arizona Diamondbacks	.429 (12–28); 8 Runs; 7 HR; 11 RBI; 1.663 OPS; 4 home run game
September 11 – September 17	Corey Kluber	Cleveland Indians	2–0; 0.00 ERA; 16 IP; K/BB: 17/0; .148 BAA; SHO	J. D. Martinez	Arizona Diamondbacks	.435 (10–23); 8 Runs; 3 HR; 6 RBI; 1.437 OPS
September 18 – September 24	Aaron Judge	New York Yankees	.429 (9–21); 6 Runs; 5 HR; 9 RBI; 1.720 OPS	Marcell Ozuna	Miami Marlins	.500 (10–20); 6 Runs; 3 HR; 7 RBI; 1.615 OPS
September 18 – September 24	Aaron Judge	New York Yankees	.429 (9–21); 6 Runs; 5 HR; 9 RBI; 1.720 OPS	Giancarlo Stanton	Miami Marlins	.348 (8–23); 6 Runs; 3 HR; 13 RBI; 1.266 OPS
September 25 – October 1	Carlos Correa	Houston Astros	.520 (13–25); 8 Runs; 3 HR; 10 RBI; 1.611 OPS	Andrew McCutchen	Pittsburgh Pirates	.471 (8–17); 6 Runs; 2 HR; 9 RBI; 1.526 OPS

== 2016 ==
Week	American League			National League		
Week	Player(s)	Team(s)	Highlights	Player(s)	Team(s)	Highlights
April 3 – April 10	Tyler White	Houston Astros	.556 (10–18); 3 Runs; 3 HR; 9 RBI; 1.758 OPS	Trevor Story	Colorado Rockies	.333 (9–27); 7 Runs; 7 HR; 12 RBI; 1.468 OPS
April 11 – April 17	Jose Altuve	Houston Astros	.407 (11–27); 8 Runs; 3 HR; 7 RBI; 1.336 OPS	Nolan Arenado	Colorado Rockies	.333 (9–27); 7 Runs; 4 HR; 12 RBI; 1.185 OPS
April 11 – April 17	Mark Trumbo	Baltimore Orioles	.320 (8–25); 8 Runs; 5 HR; 11 RBI; 1.306 OPS	Bryce Harper	Washington Nationals	.346 (9–26); 6 Runs; 4 HR; 12 RBI; 1.246 OPS
April 18 – April 24	Colby Rasmus	Houston Astros	.316 (6–19); 5 Runs; 4 HR; 10 RBI; 1.458 OPS	Jake Arrieta	Chicago Cubs	1–0; 0.00 ERA; 9 IP; K/BB 6/4; .000 BAA; second career no-hitter
April 25 – May 1	Victor Martinez	Detroit Tigers	.519 (14–27); 8 Runs; 3 HR; 8 RBI; 1.604 OPS	Hunter Pence	San Francisco Giants	.421 (8–19); 4 Runs; 2 HR; 10 RBI; 1.395 OPS
May 2 – May 8	Robinson Cano	Seattle Mariners	.516 (16–31); 8 Runs; 4 HR; 9 RBI; 1.516 OPS	Bartolo Colón	New York Mets	2–0; 1.84 ERA; 14.2 IP; K/BB 12/1; .241 BAA; oldest player in Major League history to hit his first career home run
May 2 – May 8	Robinson Cano	Seattle Mariners	.516 (16–31); 8 Runs; 4 HR; 9 RBI; 1.516 OPS	Ben Zobrist	Chicago Cubs	.360 (9–25); 8 Runs; 4 HR; 15 RBI; 1.335 OPS
May 9 – May 15	Jackie Bradley Jr.	Boston Red Sox	.469 (15–32); 6 Runs; 3 HR; 15 RBI; 1.297 OPS	Jose Fernandez	Miami Marlins	2–0; 0.64 ERA; 14 IP; K/BB 22/7; .170 BAA
May 16 – May 22	Miguel Cabrera	Detroit Tigers	.500 (11–22); 6 Runs; 3 HR; 6 RBI; 1.538 OPS	Noah Syndergaard	New York Mets	2–0; 0.00 ERA; 14 IP; K/BB 21/0; .220 BAA
May 16 – May 22	Cameron Maybin	Detroit Tigers	.600 (12–20); 5 Runs; 1 HR; 5 RBI; 4 SB; 1.402 OPS	Noah Syndergaard	New York Mets	2–0; 0.00 ERA; 14 IP; K/BB 21/0; .220 BAA
May 23 – May 29	Joe Mauer	Minnesota Twins	.440 (11–25); 7 Runs; 4 HR; 7 RBI; 1.420 OPS	Johnny Cueto	San Francisco Giants	2–0; 0.60 ERA; 15 IP; K/BB 11/2; SHO; .154 BAA
May 30 – June 5	Evan Longoria	Tampa Bay Rays	.464 (13–28); 7 Runs; 5 HR; 9 RBI; 1.623 OPS	Matt Carpenter	St. Louis Cardinals	.560 (14–25); 10 Runs; 3 RBI; 7 XBH; 1.497 OPS
June 6 – June 12	Chris Davis	Baltimore Orioles	.368 (7–19); 5 Runs; 5 HR; 10 RBI; 1.672 OPS	Jon Lester	Chicago Cubs	2–0; 0.00 ERA; 15 IP; K/BB 16/0; .170 BAA
June 13 – June 19	Josh Donaldson	Toronto Blue Jays	.444 (12–27); 11 Runs; 3 HR; 9 RBI; 1.545 OPS	Freddie Freeman	Atlanta Braves	.548 (17–31); 6 Runs; 3 HR; 8 RBI; 1.653 OPS; hit for cycle
June 20 – June 26	Carlos Correa	Houston Astros	.333 (8–24); 6 Runs; 3 HR; 9 RBI; 1.282 OPS	Charlie Blackmon	Colorado Rockies	.424 (14–33); 9 Runs; 5 HR; 9 RBI; 1.381 OPS
June 27 – July 3	Kendrys Morales	Kansas City Royals	.577 (15–26); 6 Runs; 4 HR; 10 RBI; 1.761 OPS	Danny Espinosa	Washington Nationals	.423 (11–26); 8 Runs; 5 HR; 17 RBI; 1.593 OPS
July 4 – July 10	Kennys Vargas	Minnesota Twins	.471 (8–17); 9 Runs; 3 HR; 4 RBI; 1.903 OPS	Giancarlo Stanton	Miami Marlins	.391 (9–23); 6 Runs; 5 HR; 10 RBI; 1.548 OPS
July 15 – July 17	Matt Shoemaker	Los Angeles Angels of Anaheim	1–0; 0.00 ERA; 9 IP; K/BB 13/0; SHO; .182 BAA	Jake Lamb	Arizona Diamondbacks	.583 (7–12); 3 Runs; 1 HR; 4 RBI; 1.782 OPS
July 18 – July 24	Hanley Ramírez	Boston Red Sox	.333 (7–21); 6 Runs; 5 HR; 12 RBI; 1.488 OPS	Trevor Story	Colorado Rockies	.478 (11–23); 10 Runs; 6 HR; 12 RBI; 1.876 OPS
July 25 – July 31	Mitch Moreland	Texas Rangers	.455 (10–22); 6 Runs; 5 HR; 9 RBI; 1.615 OPS	Jim Johnson	Atlanta Braves	0–0; 4 Saves; 0.00 ERA; 4 IP; K/BB 5/2; .083 BAA
August 1 – August 7	Max Kepler	Minnesota Twins	.370 (10–27); 9 Runs; 4 HR; 11 RBI; 1.285 OPS	Kyle Hendricks	Chicago Cubs	2–0; 0.55 ERA; 16.1 IP; K/BB 9/3; CG SHO; .182 BAA
August 1 – August 7	Joe Mauer	Minnesota Twins	.560 (14–25); 8 Runs; 1 HR; 9 RBI; 1.633 OPS	Ichiro Suzuki	Miami Marlins	.200 (2–10); 2 Runs; 0.673 OPS; 3,000th career hit (triple)
August 8 – August 14	Carlos Correa	Houston Astros	.429 (12–28); 6 Runs; 3 HR; 12 RBI; 1.324 OPS	Charlie Blackmon	Colorado Rockies	.563 (18–32); 13 Runs; 7 HR; 9 RBI; 1.913 OPS
August 15 – August 21	Gary Sánchez	New York Yankees	.524 (11–21); 4 Runs; 4 HR; 6 RBI; 1.790 OPS	Robbie Ray	Arizona Diamondbacks	2–0; 1.50 ERA; 12 IP; K/BB 18/3; .200 BAA
August 22 – August 28	Gary Sanchez	New York Yankees	.522 (12–23); 7 Runs; 5 HR; 9 RBI; 1.911 OPS	Asdrúbal Cabrera	New York Mets	.545 (12–21); 5 Runs; 3 HR; 8 RBI; 1.720 OPS
August 29 – September 4	Rougned Odor	Texas Rangers	.444 (12–27); 6 Runs; 5 HR; 15 RBI; 1.522 OPS	Freddie Freeman	Atlanta Braves	.400 (8–20); 7 Runs; 2 HR; 7 RBI; 1.450 OPS
September 5 – September 11	Kendrys Morales	Kansas City Royals	.409 (9–22); 6 Runs; 5 HR; 14 RBI; 1.591 OPS	Jung Ho Kang	Pittsburgh Pirates	.522 (12–23); 6 Runs; 4 HR; 10 RBI; 1.680 OPS
September 12 – September 18	Khris Davis	Oakland Athletics	.400 (10–25); 9 Runs; 5 HR; 13 RBI; 1.571 OPS	Brandon Drury	Arizona Diamondbacks	.500 (14–28); 10 Runs; 4 HR; 7 RBI; 1.624 OPS
September 12 – September 18	Hanley Ramírez	Boston Red Sox	.462 (12–26); 5 Runs; 5 HR; 12 RBI; 1.594 OPS	Sean Rodriguez	Pittsburgh Pirates	.414 (12–29); 6 Runs; 5 HR; 12 RBI; 1.386 OPS
September 19 – September 25	Carlos Santana	Cleveland Indians	.458 (11–24); 5 Runs; 2 HR; 6 RBI; 1.333 OPS	Freddie Freeman	Atlanta Braves	.500 (11–22); 5 Runs; 2 HR; 7 RBI; 1.502 OPS
September 19 – September 25	Justin Upton	Detroit Tigers	.400 (10–25); 6 Runs; 3 HR; 6 RBI; 1.344 OPS	Freddie Freeman	Atlanta Braves	.500 (11–22); 5 Runs; 2 HR; 7 RBI; 1.502 OPS
September 26 – October 2	Miguel Cabrera	Detroit Tigers	.565 (13–23); 6 Runs; 4 HR; 13 RBI; 1.714 OPS	Hunter Renfroe	San Diego Padres	.409 (9–22); 6 Runs; 3 HR; 13 RBI; 1.318 OPS

== 2015 ==
Week	American League			National League		
Week	Player(s)	Team(s)	Highlights	Player(s)	Team(s)	Highlights
April 5 – April 12	Miguel Cabrera	Detroit Tigers	.520 (13–25); 4 Runs; 2 HR; 8 RBI; 1.426 OPS	Adrián González	Los Angeles Dodgers	.609 (14–23); 8 Runs; 5 HR; 7 RBI; 2.058 OPS
April 13 – April 19	Nelson Cruz	Seattle Mariners	.500 (12–24); 7 Runs; 6 HR; 10 RBI; 1.806 OPS	Matt Carpenter	St. Louis Cardinals	.480 (12–25); 6 Runs; 1 HR; 5 RBI; 1.360 OPS
April 20 – April 26	Mark Teixeira	New York Yankees	.333 (8–24); 6 Runs; 5 HR; 10 RBI; 1.429 OPS	Adeiny Hechavarria	Miami Marlins	.500 (12–24); 8 Runs; 1 HR; 10 RBI; 1.270 OPS
April 27 – May 3	Jose Altuve	Houston Astros	.467 (14–30); 7 Runs; 1 HR; 8 RBI; 1.233 OPS	Paul Goldschmidt	Arizona Diamondbacks	.556 (15–27); 5 Runs; 1 HR; 6 RBI; 1.386 OPS
April 27 – May 3	Josh Reddick	Oakland Athletics	.478 (11–23); 8 Runs; 3 HR; 12 RBI; 1.452 OPS	Paul Goldschmidt	Arizona Diamondbacks	.556 (15–27); 5 Runs; 1 HR; 6 RBI; 1.386 OPS
May 4 – May 10	Michael Pineda	New York Yankees	2–0; 0.60 ERA; 15 IP; K/BB 22/1; .200 BAA	Bryce Harper	Washington Nationals	.455 (10–22); 8 Runs; 6 HR; 13 RBI; 1.838 OPS
May 11 – May 17	Brad Miller	Seattle Mariners	.429 (9–21); 6 Runs; 4 HR; 5 RBI; 1.643 OPS	Bryce Harper	Washington Nationals	.522 (12–23); 10 Runs; 3 HR; 9 RBI; BB/K 9/1; 1.743 OPS
May 18 – May 24	Mike Napoli	Boston Red Sox	.429 (9–21); 6 Runs; 5 HR; 10 RBI; 1.690 OPS	Ryan Braun	Milwaukee Brewers	.381 (8–21); 4 Runs; 3 HR; 11 RBI; 1.434 OPS
May 18 – May 24	Mike Napoli	Boston Red Sox	.429 (9–21); 6 Runs; 5 HR; 10 RBI; 1.690 OPS	Andrew McCutchen	Pittsburgh Pirates	.450 (9–20); 5 Runs; 3 HR; 5 RBI; 1.542 OPS
May 25 – May 31	Josh Donaldson	Toronto Blue Jays	.440 (11–25); 11 Runs; 6 HR; 11 RBI; 1.723 OPS	Todd Frazier	Cincinnati Reds	.500 (11–22); 7 Runs; 4 HR; 7 RBI; 1.787 OPS
June 1 – June 7	Chris Archer	Tampa Bay Rays	2–0; 0.60 ERA; 15 IP; K/BB 26/0; .214 BAA	Jacob deGrom	New York Mets	2–0; 1.20 ERA; 15 IP; K/BB 18/3; .140 BAA
June 1 – June 7	Chris Archer	Tampa Bay Rays	2–0; 0.60 ERA; 15 IP; K/BB 26/0; .214 BAA	Clayton Kershaw	Los Angeles Dodgers	2–0; 1.20 ERA; 15 IP; K/BB 18/3; .120 BAA
June 8 – June 14	Manny Machado	Baltimore Orioles	.458 (11–24); 9 Runs; 2 HR; 5 RBI; 1.269 OPS	Chris Heston	San Francisco Giants	1–1; 1.29 ERA; 14 IP; K/BB 17/4; .149 BAA; no-hitter
June 8 – June 14	Manny Machado	Baltimore Orioles	.458 (11–24); 9 Runs; 2 HR; 5 RBI; 1.269 OPS	Giancarlo Stanton	Miami Marlins	.520 (13–25); 7 Runs; 5 HR; 12 RBI; 1.866 OPS
June 15 – June 21	Mookie Betts	Boston Red Sox	.581 (18–31); 8 Runs; 2 HR; 7 RBI; 7 XBH; 1.594 OPS	Max Scherzer	Washington Nationals	1–0; 0.00 ERA; 9 IP; K/BB 10/0; .000 BAA; no-hitter
June 22 – June 28	Brett Gardner	New York Yankees	.500 (13–26); 9 Runs; 2 HR; 6 RBI; 1.465 OPS	Nolan Arenado	Colorado Rockies	.391 (9–23); 10 Runs; 7 HR; 14 RBI; 1.788 OPS
June 29 – July 5	J. D. Martinez	Detroit Tigers	.458 (11–24); 6 Runs; 4 HR; 10 RBI; 1.500 OPS	Aramis Ramírez	Milwaukee Brewers	.545 (12–22); 4 Runs; 1 HR; 11 RBI; 1.350 OPS
July 6 – July 12	Mike Trout	Los Angeles Angels of Anaheim	.478 (11–23); 8 Runs; 5 HR; 10 RBI; 1.686 OPS	Jake Arrieta	Chicago Cubs	2–0; 1.72 ERA; 15.2 IP; K/BB 13/2; .173 BAA; CG
July 17 – July 19	Lorenzo Cain	Kansas City Royals	.412 (7–17); 3 Runs; 2 HR; 3 RBI; 1.356 OPS	Zack Greinke	Los Angeles Dodgers	1–0; 0.00 ERA; 8 IP; 3 Hits Allowed; K/BB 11/1
July 17 – July 19	Dallas Keuchel	Houston Astros	1–0; 0.00 ERA; 7 IP; 2 Hits Allowed; K/BB 13/0	Clayton Kershaw	Los Angeles Dodgers	1–0; 0.00 ERA; 8 IP; 3 Hits Allowed; K/BB 14/0
July 20 – July 26	Rougned Odor	Texas Rangers	.385 (10–26); 9 Runs; 3 HR; 8 RBI; 7 XBH; 1.337 OPS	Carlos González	Colorado Rockies	.476 (10–21); 9 Runs; 5 HR; 11 RBI; 1.712 OPS
July 20 – July 26	Rougned Odor	Texas Rangers	.385 (10–26); 9 Runs; 3 HR; 8 RBI; 7 XBH; 1.337 OPS	Cole Hamels	Philadelphia Phillies	1–0; 0.00 ERA; 9 IP; K/BB 13/2; no-hitter
July 27 – August 2	José Abreu	Chicago White Sox	.400 (10–25); 7 Runs; 3 HR; 10 RBI; 1.380 OPS	Lucas Duda	New York Mets	.474 (9–19); 7 Runs; 7 HR; 10 RBI; 2.155 OPS
July 27 – August 2	Adam Eaton	Chicago White Sox	.517 (15–29); 10 Runs; 1 HR; 4 RBI; 3 SB; 1.393 OPS	Noah Syndergaard	New York Mets	2–0; 1.13 ERA; 16 IP; K/BB 18/0; .179 BAA
August 3 – August 9	Josh Donaldson	Toronto Blue Jays	.385 (10–26); 9 Runs; 5 HR; 8 RBI; 1.522 OPS	Andrew McCutchen	Pittsburgh Pirates	.563 (9–16); 7 Runs; 2 HR; 8 RBI; 1.715 OPS
August 3 – August 9	David Price	Toronto Blue Jays	2–0; 0.60 ERA; 15 IP; K/BB 18/5; .118 BAA	Andrew McCutchen	Pittsburgh Pirates	.563 (9–16); 7 Runs; 2 HR; 8 RBI; 1.715 OPS
August 10 – August 16	Hisashi Iwakuma	Seattle Mariners	1–0; 0.00 ERA; 9 IP; K/BB 7/3; no-hitter	Madison Bumgarner	San Francisco Giants	2–0; 0.50 ERA; 18 IP; K/BB 26/1; .133 BAA; 2 CG; SHO
August 17 – August 23	Mike Fiers	Houston Astros	1–0; 0.00 ERA; 9 IP; K/BB 10/3; no-hitter	A. J. Pollock	Arizona Diamondbacks	.483 (14–29); 8 Runs; 1 HR; 4 RBI; 4 SB; 1.275 OPS
August 24 – August 30	Edwin Encarnación	Toronto Blue Jays	.391 (9–23); 7 Runs; 6 HR; 17 RBI; 1.722 OPS	Jake Arrieta	Chicago Cubs	2–0; 0.00 ERA; 15 IP; K/BB 20/2; .080 BAA; no-hitter
August 31 – September 6	Logan Forsythe	Tampa Bay Rays	.545 (12–22); 5 Runs; 6 XBH; 1 RBI; 1.447 OPS	Bartolo Colón	New York Mets	2–0; 0.00 ERA; 17 IP; K/BB 11/1; .217 BAA; SHO
September 7 – September 13	David Ortiz	Boston Red Sox	.444 (8–18); 5 Runs; 3 HR; 9 RBI; 1.657 OPS; 500th career HR	Yoenis Céspedes	New York Mets	.345 (10–29); 6 Runs; 4 HR; 12 RBI; 1.263 OPS
September 14 – September 20	Jose Abreu	Chicago White Sox	.458 (11–24); 3 Runs; 2 HR; 9 RBI; 1.343 OPS	Bryce Harper	Washington Nationals	.519 (14–27); 12 Runs; 5 HR; 10 RBI; 1.687 OPS
September 14 – September 20	Prince Fielder	Texas Rangers	.308 (8–26); 9 Runs; 3 HR; 9 RBI; 1.091 OPS	Stephen Strasburg	Washington Nationals	2–0; 0.60 ERA; 15 IP; K/BB 24/2; .135 BAA
September 21 – September 27	Kevin Pillar	Toronto Blue Jays	.524 (11–21); 4 Runs; 2 HR; 6 RBI; 1.631 OPS	Jake Arrieta	Chicago Cubs	2–0; 0.00 ERA; 16 IP; K/BB 20/1; .078 BAA; SHO
September 28 – October 4	Adrián Beltré	Texas Rangers	.448 (13–29); 6 Runs; 2 HR; 13 RBI; 1.277 OPS	Max Scherzer	Washington Nationals	2–0; 0.53 ERA; 17 IP; K/BB 27/3; .038 BAA; second no-hitter

== 2014 ==
Week	American League			National League		
Week	Player(s)	Team(s)	Highlights	Player(s)	Team(s)	Highlights
March 22 – April 6	Chris Colabello	Minnesota Twins	.391 (9–23); 4 Runs; 1 HR; 11 RBI; 1.112 OPS	Charlie Blackmon	Colorado Rockies	.542 (13–24); 5 Runs; 1 HR; 6 RBI; 2 SB; 1.352 OPS (6-hit game)
March 22 – April 6	Josh Hamilton	Los Angeles Angels of Anaheim	.500 (11–22); 5 Runs; 2 HR; 5 RBI; 1.424 OPS	Jose Fernandez	Miami Marlins	2–0; 0.71 ERA; 12.2 IP; K/BB 17/2; .174 BAA
April 7 – April 13	Carlos Beltrán	New York Yankees	.423 (11–26); 7 Runs; 3 HR; 6 RBI; 1.387 OPS	Justin Upton	Atlanta Braves	.591 (13–22); 8 Runs; 4 HR; 8 RBI; 1.881 OPS
April 14 – April 20	Kevin Kouzmanoff	Texas Rangers	.345 (10–29); 6 Runs; 2 HR; 8 RBI; 1.034 OPS	Justin Morneau	Colorado Rockies	.375 (9–24); 6 Runs; 3 HR; 12 RBI; 1.221 OPS
April 21 – April 27	Jose Abreu	Chicago White Sox	.310 (9–29); 8 Runs; 5 HR; 14 RBI; 1.172 OPS	Carlos Ruiz	Philadelphia Phillies	.500 (11–22); 8 Runs; 1 HR; 7 RBI; 1.502 OPS
April 21 – April 27	Kyle Seager	Seattle Mariners	.409 (9–22); 8 Runs; 5 HR; 11 RBI; 1.549 OPS	Carlos Ruiz	Philadelphia Phillies	.500 (11–22); 8 Runs; 1 HR; 7 RBI; 1.502 OPS
April 28 – May 4	Desmond Jennings	Tampa Bay Rays	.355 (11–31); 8 Runs; 3 HR; 3 RBI; 3 SB; 1.136 OPS	Troy Tulowitzki	Colorado Rockies	.619 (13–21); 9 Runs; 2 HR; 8 RBI; 1.740 OPS
May 5 – May 11	Edwin Encarnación	Toronto Blue Jays	.321 (9–28); 5 Runs; 4 HR; 10 RBI; 1.238 OPS	Seth Smith	San Diego Padres	.500 (14–28); 4 Runs; 1 HR; 7 RBI; 9 XBH; 1.576 OPS
May 12 – May 18	Brandon Moss	Oakland Athletics	.455 (10–22); 8 Runs; 3 HR; 11 RBI; 9 XBH; 1.737 OPS	A.J. Pollock	Arizona Diamondbacks	.500 (11–22); 4 Runs; 2 HR; 4 RBI; 1.431 OPS
May 12 – May 18	Brandon Moss	Oakland Athletics	.455 (10–22); 8 Runs; 3 HR; 11 RBI; 9 XBH; 1.737 OPS	Yasiel Puig	Los Angeles Dodgers	.348 (8–23); 5 Runs; 3 HR; 10 RBI; 1.334 OPS
May 19 – May 25	Dallas Keuchel	Houston Astros	2–0; 1.02 ERA; 17.2 IP; K/BB 14/1; .153 BAA	Josh Beckett	Los Angeles Dodgers	2–0; 2.57 ERA; 14 IP; K/BB 12/5; .160 BAA; no-hitter
May 19 – May 25	Dallas Keuchel	Houston Astros	2–0; 1.02 ERA; 17.2 IP; K/BB 14/1; .153 BAA	Adam Wainwright	St. Louis Cardinals	2–0; 0.00 ERA; 17 IP; K/BB 21/1; CG SHO; .107 BAA
May 26 – June 1	Nelson Cruz	Baltimore Orioles	.476 (10–21); 5 Runs; 4 HR; 8 RBI; 1.746 OPS	A.J. Pollock	Arizona Diamondbacks	.522 (12–23); 9 Runs; 1 HR; 4 RBI; 8 XBH; 1.593 OPS
June 2 – June 8	Félix Hernández	Seattle Mariners	1–0; 1.29 ERA; 14 IP; K/BB 23/1; .231 BAA	Jordan Zimmermann	Washington Nationals	2–0; 0.00 ERA; 17 IP; K/BB 16/1; CG SHO; .121 BAA
June 9 – June 15	Michael Brantley	Cleveland Indians	.538 (14–26); 9 Runs; 2 HR; 3 RBI; 1.510 OPS	Andrew McCutchen	Pittsburgh Pirates	.483 (14–29); 5 Runs; 4 HR; 13 RBI; 1.593 OPS
June 16 – June 22	J. D. Martinez	Detroit Tigers	.444 (12–27); 6 Runs; 4 HR; 11 RBI; 1.464 OPS	Clayton Kershaw	Los Angeles Dodgers	1–0; 0.00 ERA; 9 IP; K/BB 15/0; .000 BAA; no-hitter
June 23 – June 29	Kyle Seager	Seattle Mariners	.583 (14–24); 5 Runs; 2 HR; 8 RBI; 1.542 OPS	Tim Lincecum	San Francisco Giants	1–0; 0.00 ERA; 9 IP; K/BB 6/1; .000 BAA; second career no-hitter
June 30 – July 6	Adam Jones	Baltimore Orioles	.423 (11–26); 4 Runs; 2 HR; 5 RBI; 1.144 OPS	Jayson Werth	Washington Nationals	.450 (9–20); 7 Runs; 2 HR; 9 RBI; 1.560 OPS
June 30 – July 6	Steve Pearce	Baltimore Orioles	.333 (10–30); 8 Runs; 3 HR; 9 RBI; 1.064 OPS	Jayson Werth	Washington Nationals	.450 (9–20); 7 Runs; 2 HR; 9 RBI; 1.560 OPS
July 7 – July 13	Mike Trout	Los Angeles Angels of Anaheim	.333 (10–30); 7 Runs; 2 HR; 10 RBI; 1.008 OPS	Andrew McCutchen	Pittsburgh Pirates	.321 (9–28); 9 Runs; 4 HR; 7 RBI; 1.268 OPS
July 14 – July 20	Jason Kipnis	Cleveland Indians	.333 (5–15); 3 Runs; 2 HR; 6 RBI; 1.207 OPS	Anthony Rizzo	Chicago Cubs	.455 (5–11); 3 Runs; 3 HR; 4 RBI; 1.773 OPS
July 21 – July 27	Carlos Santana	Cleveland Indians	.556 (15–27); 8 Runs; 6 HR; 10 RBI; 1.970 OPS	Steve Cishek	Miami Marlins	0–0; 5 Saves; 1.80 ERA; 5 IP; K/BB 8/0; .125 BAA
July 21 – July 27	Carlos Santana	Cleveland Indians	.556 (15–27); 8 Runs; 6 HR; 10 RBI; 1.970 OPS	Jacob deGrom	New York Mets	2–0; 0.68 ERA; 13.1 IP; K/BB 11/3; .184 BAA
July 28 – August 3	Brett Gardner	New York Yankees	.478 (11–23); 8 Runs; 5 HR; 7 RBI; 1.832 OPS	Matt Kemp	Los Angeles Dodgers	.409 (9–22); 6 Runs; 5 HR; 9 RBI; 1.549 OPS
August 4 – August 10	Billy Butler	Kansas City Royals	.435 (10–23); 7 Runs; 2 HR; 7 RBI; 1.371 OPS	Johnny Cueto	Cincinnati Reds	2–0; 2.12 ERA; 17 IP; CG; K/BB 15/4; .167 BAA
August 11 – August 17	Chris Carter	Houston Astros	.321 (9–28); 5 Runs; 4 HR; 9 RBI; 1.083 OPS	Corey Dickerson	Colorado Rockies	.393 (11–28); 6 Runs; 3 HR; 11 RBI; 1.257 OPS
August 18 – August 24	Trevor Plouffe	Minnesota Twins	.367 (11–30); 6 Runs; 2 HR; 10 RBI; 1.120 OPS	Nolan Arenado	Colorado Rockies	.545 (12–22); 6 Runs; 2 HR; 3 RBI; 1.645 OPS
August 18 – August 24	Danny Santana	Minnesota Twins	.378 (14–37); 7 Runs; 1 HR; 6 RBI; 1.032 OPS	Nolan Arenado	Colorado Rockies	.545 (12–22); 6 Runs; 2 HR; 3 RBI; 1.645 OPS
August 25 – August 31	Jacoby Ellsbury	New York Yankees	.522 (12–23); 6 Runs; 4 HR; 9 RBI; 1.674 OPS	Matt Holliday	St. Louis Cardinals	.370 (10–27); 5 Runs; 4 HR; 13 RBI; 1.322 OPS
September 1 – September 7	Miguel Cabrera	Detroit Tigers	.500 (15–30); 8 Runs; 5 HR; 9 RBI; 1.567 OPS	Adam LaRoche	Washington Nationals	.333 (5–15); 5 Runs; 4 HR; 10 RBI; 1.554 OPS
September 1 – September 7	Nelson Cruz	Baltimore Orioles	.407 (11–27); 6 Runs; 4 HR; 12 RBI; 1.430 OPS	Buster Posey	San Francisco Giants	.565 (13–23); 8 Runs; 2 HR; 8 RBI; 1.549 OPS
September 8 – September 14	Jon Lester	Oakland Athletics	2–0; 1.29 ERA; 14 IP; K/BB 15/6; .220 BAA	Clayton Kershaw	Los Angeles Dodgers	2–0; 1.69 ERA; 16 IP; K/BB 17/3; .175 BAA
September 15 – September 21	Corey Kluber	Cleveland Indians	2–0; 1.80 ERA; 15 IP; K/BB 28/3; .237 BAA	Andrew Cashner	San Diego Padres	2–0; 1.06 ERA; 17 IP; K/BB 14/2; CG SHO; .109 BAA
September 22 – September 28	Sonny Gray	Oakland Athletics	1–1; 0.56 ERA; 16 IP; K/BB 17/3; CG SHO; .173 BAA	Jordan Zimmermann	Washington Nationals	1–0; 0.00 ERA; 9 IP; K/BB 10/1; .000 BAA; no-hitter
September 22 – September 28	Josh Reddick	Oakland Athletics	.480 (12–25); 4 Runs; 1 HR; 7 RBI; 1.240 OPS	Jordan Zimmermann	Washington Nationals	1–0; 0.00 ERA; 9 IP; K/BB 10/1; .000 BAA; no-hitter

== 2013 ==
Week	American League			National League		
Week	Player(s)	Team(s)	Highlights	Player(s)	Team(s)	Highlights
March 31 – April 7	Chris Davis	Baltimore Orioles	.455 (10–22); 5 Runs; 4 HR; 17 RBI; 1.636 OPS	Clayton Kershaw	Los Angeles Dodgers	2–0; 0.00 ERA; 16 IP; K/BB 16/1; CG SHO; .118 BAA
April 8 – April 14	Prince Fielder	Detroit Tigers	.632 (12–19); 5 Runs; 2 HR; 11 RBI; 1.891 OPS	Matt Harvey	New York Mets	2–0; 1.20 ERA; 15 IP; K/BB 15/4; .104 BAA
April 15 – April 21	Andrew Bailey	Boston Red Sox	1–0; 3 Saves; 3.60 ERA; 5 IP; K/BB 8/1; .211 BAA	Carlos Gómez	Milwaukee Brewers	.500 (9–18); 5 Runs; 2 HR; 3 RBI; 1.471 OPS
April 15 – April 21	Mike Napoli	Boston Red Sox	.345 (10–29); 5 Runs; 1 HR; 10 RBI; 1.096 OPS	Carlos Gómez	Milwaukee Brewers	.500 (9–18); 5 Runs; 2 HR; 3 RBI; 1.471 OPS
April 22 – April 28	Josh Donaldson	Oakland Athletics	.545 (12–22); 4 Runs; 7 Doubles; 10 RBI; 1.497 OPS	Russell Martin	Pittsburgh Pirates	.375 (9–24); 5 Runs; 4 HR; 6 RBI; 1.333 OPS
April 29 – May 5	Ryan Raburn	Cleveland Indians	.591 (13–22); 5 Runs; 4 HR; 9 RBI; 1.773 OPS	Tim Hudson	Atlanta Braves	2–0; 2.51 ERA; 14.1 IP; K/BB 13/3; .157 BAA; 200th career victory
May 6 – May 12	Evan Longoria	Tampa Bay Rays	.464 (13–28); 8 Runs; 3 HR; 11 RBI; 1.496 OPS	Jean Segura	Milwaukee Brewers	.500 (10–20); 5 Runs; 2 HR; 2 RBI; 2 SB; 1.495 OPS
May 13 – May 19	Justin Masterson	Cleveland Indians	2–0; 0.00 ERA; 16.0 IP; K/BB 20/5; CG SHO; .130 BAA	Joey Votto	Cincinnati Reds	.583 (14–24); 7 Runs; 2 HR; 5 RBI; 1.572 OPS
May 20 – May 26	Jason Castro	Houston Astros	.579 (11–19); 5 Runs; 3 HR; 5 RBI; 1.742 OPS	Domonic Brown	Philadelphia Phillies	.348 (8–23); 4 Runs; 2 HR; 7 RBI; 1.130 OPS
May 27 – June 2	Chris Davis	Baltimore Orioles	.481 (13–27); 10 Runs; 4 HR; 6 RBI; 1.463 OPS	Domonic Brown	Philadelphia Phillies	.444 (12–27); 8 Runs; 7 HR; 13 RBI; 1.779 OPS
June 3 – June 9	Brett Gardner	New York Yankees	.520 (13–25); 5 Runs; 1 HR; 6 RBI; 1.396 OPS	Yasiel Puig	Los Angeles Dodgers	.464 (13–28); 4 Runs; 4 HR; 10 RBI; 1.447 OPS
June 10 – June 16	Jason Kipnis	Cleveland Indians	.524 (11–21); 5 Runs; 1 HR; 4 RBI; 2 SB; 1.354 OPS	Carlos González	Colorado Rockies	.476 (10–21); 6 Runs; 3 HR; 8 RBI; 1.617 OPS
June 10 – June 16	Corey Kluber	Cleveland Indians	2–0; 0.56 ERA; 16 IP; K/BB 11/3; .232 BAA	Carlos González	Colorado Rockies	.476 (10–21); 6 Runs; 3 HR; 8 RBI; 1.617 OPS
June 17 – June 23	Max Scherzer	Detroit Tigers	2–0; 2.08 ERA; 13 IP; K/BB 16/2; .260 BAA	Pedro Alvarez	Pittsburgh Pirates	.414 (12–29); 5 Runs; 4 HR; 10 RBI; 1.383 OPS
June 24 – June 30	Jason Kipnis	Cleveland Indians	.478 (11–23); 9 Runs; 3 HR; 10 RBI; 1.650 OPS	Buster Posey	San Francisco Giants	.500 (11–22); 4 Runs; 4 HR; 6 RBI; 1.742 OPS
July 1 – July 7	Adrián Beltré	Texas Rangers	.478 (11–23); 4 Runs; 4 HR; 5 RBI; 1.607 OPS	Homer Bailey	Cincinnati Reds	1–0; 0.00 ERA; 9 IP; K/BB 9/1; .000 BAA; 2nd career no-hitter
July 1 – July 7	Adrián Beltré	Texas Rangers	.478 (11–23); 4 Runs; 4 HR; 5 RBI; 1.607 OPS	Brian McCann	Atlanta Braves	.600 (15–25); 6 Runs; 1 HR; 4 RBI; 1.480 OPS
July 8 – July 14	Alejandro De Aza	Chicago White Sox	.414 (12–29); 7 Runs; 2 HR; 4 RBI; 1.262 OPS	Tim Lincecum	San Francisco Giants	1–0; 1.69 ERA; 16 IP; K/BB 24/5; .113 BAA; 1st career no-hitter
July 15 – July 21	Brad Miller	Seattle Mariners	.385 (5–13); 4 Runs; 2 HR; 7 RBI; 1.346 OPS	Juan Lagares	New York Mets	.700 (7–10); 2 Runs; 1 HR; 5 RBI; 1.900 OPS
July 22 – July 28	Edwin Encarnación	Toronto Blue Jays	.520 (13–25); 5 Runs; 2 HR; 8 RBI; 1.461 OPS	Steve Cishek	Miami Marlins	0–0; 5 Saves; 0.00 ERA; 5 IP; K/BB 5/2; .222 BAA
July 22 – July 28	Edwin Encarnación	Toronto Blue Jays	.520 (13–25); 5 Runs; 2 HR; 8 RBI; 1.461 OPS	Jose Fernandez	Miami Marlins	2–0; 2.40 ERA; 15 IP; K/BB 21/2; .192 BAA
July 29 – August 4	Shane Victorino	Boston Red Sox	.400 (12–30); 7 Runs; 2 HR; 6 RBI; 1.141 OPS	Francisco Liriano	Pittsburgh Pirates	2–0; 0.64 ERA; 14 IP; K/BB 14/7; .133 BAA
August 5 – August 11	Miguel Cabrera	Detroit Tigers	.429 (12–28); 7 Runs; 4 HR; 11 RBI; 1.444 OPS	Brandon Belt	San Francisco Giants	.440 (11–25); 8 Runs; 2 HR; 5 RBI; 1.300 OPS
August 5 – August 11	Austin Jackson	Detroit Tigers	.371 (13–35); 9 Runs; 4 2B; 2 3B; 2 HR; 2 RBI; 1.192 OPS	Brandon Belt	San Francisco Giants	.440 (11–25); 8 Runs; 2 HR; 5 RBI; 1.300 OPS
August 12 – August 18	Alfonso Soriano	New York Yankees	.484 (15–31); 9 Runs; 5 HR; 18 RBI; 1.515 OPS	Will Venable	San Diego Padres	.406 (13–32); 7 Runs; 2 HR; 5 RBI; 1.125 OPS
August 19 – August 25	Jason Castro	Houston Astros	.529 (9–17); 7 Runs; 3 HR; 5 RBI; 1.913 OPS	Jose Fernandez	Miami Marlins	2–0; 0.69 ERA; 13 IP; K/BB 16/3; .167 BAA
August 19 – August 25	Jason Castro	Houston Astros	.529 (9–17); 7 Runs; 3 HR; 5 RBI; 1.913 OPS	Jeff Samardzija	Chicago Cubs	2–0; 1.59 ERA; 17 IP; K/BB 12/2; CG; .213 BAA
August 26 – September 1	Brandon Moss	Oakland Athletics	.364 (8–22); 8 Runs; 4 HR; 11 RBI; 1.455 OPS	Daniel Murphy	New York Mets	.448 (13–29); 7 Runs; 5 2B; 7 RBI; 1.069 OPS
September 2 – September 8	Will Middlebrooks	Boston Red Sox	.464 (13–28); 8 Runs; 4 HR; 9 RBI; 1.429 OPS	Huston Street	San Diego Padres	1–0; 4 Saves; 1.80 ERA; 5 IP; K/BB 4/0; .176 BAA
September 2 – September 8	Mike Napoli	Boston Red Sox	.476 (10–21); 7 Runs; 4 HR; 9 RBI; 1.720 OPS	Huston Street	San Diego Padres	1–0; 4 Saves; 1.80 ERA; 5 IP; K/BB 4/0; .176 BAA
September 9 – September 15	Chris Iannetta	Los Angeles Angels of Anaheim	.429 (9–21); 7 Runs; 3 HR; 5 RBI; 1.452 OPS	Hunter Pence	San Francisco Giants	.448 (13–29); 8 Runs; 6 HR; 19 RBI; 1.572 OPS
September 16 – September 22	Alex Cobb	Tampa Bay Rays	2–0; 1.65 ERA; 16.1 IP; K/BB 22/3; .193 BAA	Charlie Blackmon	Colorado Rockies	.500 (18–36); 6 Runs; 1 HR; 5 RBI; 1.222 OPS
September 23 – September 29	James Loney	Tampa Bay Rays	.435 (10–23); 5 Runs; 1 HR; 5 RBI; 1.263 OPS	Henderson Álvarez	Miami Marlins	1–1; 1.13 ERA; 16 IP; K/BB 9/4; .094 BAA; 1st career no-hitter
September 23 – September 29	Alex Ríos	Texas Rangers	.346 (9–26); 6 Runs; 1 HR; 8 RBI; 1.011 OPS	Henderson Álvarez	Miami Marlins	1–1; 1.13 ERA; 16 IP; K/BB 9/4; .094 BAA; 1st career no-hitter

== 2012 ==
Week	American League			National League		
Week	Player(s)	Team(s)	Highlights	Player(s)	Team(s)	Highlights
April 4 – April 8	Miguel Cabrera	Detroit Tigers	.455 (5–11); 5 Runs; 3 HR; 8 RBI; 1.806 OPS	Matt Kemp	Los Angeles Dodgers	.412 (7–17); 6 Runs; 2 HR; 8 RBI; 1.212 OPS
April 9 – April 15	Josh Willingham	Minnesota Twins	.455 (10–22); 6 Runs; 3 HR; 4 RBI; 1.448 OPS	Matt Kemp	Los Angeles Dodgers	.545 (12–22); 7 Runs; 4 HR; 8 RBI; 1.797 OPS
April 16 – April 22	Philip Humber	Chicago White Sox	1–0; 0.63 ERA; 14.1 IP; K/BB 16/3; .122 BAA; Perfect game	Freddie Freeman	Atlanta Braves	.478 (11–23); 7 Runs; 3 HR; 14 RBI; 1.568 OPS
April 23 – April 29	Paul Konerko	Chicago White Sox	.435 (10–23); 3 Runs; 3 HR; 4 RBI; 1.457 OPS	Jay Bruce	Cincinnati Reds	.476 (10–21); 7 Runs; 4 HR; 10 RBI; 1.685 OPS
April 30 – May 6	Jered Weaver	Los Angeles Angels of Anaheim	1–0; 0.00 ERA; 9 IP; K/BB 9/1; .000 BAA; No-hitter	Freddie Freeman	Atlanta Braves	.367 (11–30); 6 Runs; 3 HR; 10 RBI; 1.130 OPS
May 7 – May 13	Josh Hamilton	Texas Rangers	.467 (14–30); 10 Runs; 9 HR; 18 RBI; 1.963 OPS; 4 home run game	Carlos Beltrán	St. Louis Cardinals	.360 (9–25); 8 Runs; 6 HR; 13 RBI; 1.648 OPS
May 14 – May 20	J. P. Arencibia	Toronto Blue Jays	.360 (9–25); 7 Runs; 4 HR; 10 RBI; 1.305 OPS	Clayton Kershaw	Los Angeles Dodgers	2–0; 0.00 ERA; 16 IP; K/BB 10/3; CG SHO; .185 BAA
May 21 – May 27	Paul Konerko	Chicago White Sox	.583 (14–24); 10 Runs; 3 HR; 10 RBI; 1.740 OPS	R. A. Dickey	New York Mets	2–0; 0.63 ERA; 14.1 IP; K/BB 21/1; .167 BAA
May 28 – June 3	Justin Smoak	Seattle Mariners	.348 (8–23); 7 Runs; 3 HR; 8 RBI; 1.265 OPS	Johan Santana	New York Mets	1–0; 0.00 ERA; 9 IP; K/BB 8/5; No-hitter; First no-hitter in Mets history
June 4 – June 10	Torii Hunter	Los Angeles Angels of Anaheim	.500 (11–22); 10 Runs; 4 HR; 10 RBI; 1.605 OPS	Ryan Dempster	Chicago Cubs	2–0; 0.00 ERA; 15 IP; K/BB 9/1; .137 BAA
June 4 – June 10	Mike Trout	Los Angeles Angels of Anaheim	.520 (13–25); 10 Runs; 4 RBI; 4 SB; 1.167 OPS	Jason Kubel	Arizona Diamondbacks	.409 (9–22); 6 Runs; 2 HR; 12 RBI; 1.253 OPS
June 11 – June 17	Brandon Moss	Oakland Athletics	.348 (8–23); 7 Runs; 5 HR; 10 RBI; 1.530 OPS	Matt Cain	San Francisco Giants	1–0; 0.00 ERA; 9 IP; K/BB 14/0; .000 BA; Perfect game
June 18 – June 24	Will Middlebrooks	Boston Red Sox	.625 (10–16); 6 Runs; 3 HR; 10 RBI; 2.007 OPS	Jason Heyward	Atlanta Braves	.522 (12–23); 9 Runs; 3 HR; 5 RBI; 1.672 OPS
June 25 – July 1	Robinson Canó	New York Yankees	.414 (12–29); 5 Runs; 4 HR; 10 RBI; 1.310 OPS	Mat Latos	Cincinnati Reds	2–0; 1.00 ERA; 18 IP (2 CG); K/BB 20/2; .100 BAA
July 2 – July 8	Kevin Youkilis	Chicago White Sox	.478 (11–23); 7 Runs; 3 HR; 10 RBI; 1.484 OPS	Andrew McCutchen	Pittsburgh Pirates	.517 (15–29); 11 Runs; 3 HR; 9 RBI; 1.479 OPS
July 9 – July 15	Yoenis Céspedes	Oakland Athletics	.571 (8–14); 5 Runs; 2 HR; 6 RBI; 1.643 OPS	Andrew McCutchen	Pittsburgh Pirates	.583 (7–12); 3 Runs; 3 HR; 4 RBI; 1.976 OPS
July 16 – July 22	Adrián González	Boston Red Sox	.429 (12–28); 5 Runs; 3 HR; 12 RBI; 1.179 OPS	Ryan Zimmerman	Washington Nationals	.500 (15–30); 9 Runs; 5 HR; 8 RBI; 1.638 OPS
July 23 – July 29	Billy Butler	Kansas City Royals	.458 (11–24); 4 Runs; 1 HR; 6 RBI; 1.260 OPS	Carlos Gómez	Milwaukee Brewers	.346 (9–26); 10 Runs; 4 HR; 10 RBI; 1.264 OPS
July 23 – July 29	Billy Butler	Kansas City Royals	.458 (11–24); 4 Runs; 1 HR; 6 RBI; 1.260 OPS	Drew Stubbs	Cincinnati Reds	.370 (10–27); 9 Runs; 3 HR; 10 RBI; 1.197 OPS
July 30 – August 5	Albert Pujols	Los Angeles Angels of Anaheim	.424 (14–33); 9 Runs; 6 HR; 13 RBI; 1.566 OPS	A. J. Burnett	Pittsburgh Pirates	2–0; 1.02 ERA; 17.2 IP; K/BB 15/5; CG SHO; .071 BAA
August 6 – August 12	Adrián González	Boston Red Sox	.393 (11–28); 6 Runs; 2 HR; 14 RBI; 1.290 OPS	Chase Headley	San Diego Padres	.333 (8–24); 6 Runs; 3 HR; 11 RBI; 1.110 OPS
August 6 – August 12	Manny Machado	Baltimore Orioles	.375 (6–16); 5 Runs; 3 HR; 7 RBI; 1.500 OPS	Chase Headley	San Diego Padres	.333 (8–24); 6 Runs; 3 HR; 11 RBI; 1.110 OPS
August 13 – August 19	Félix Hernández	Seattle Mariners	1–0; 0.00 ERA; 9 IP; K/BB 12/0; .000 BAA; Perfect game	Cole Hamels	Philadelphia Phillies	2–0; 1.62 ERA; 16.2 IP; K/BB 15/2; CG SHO; .246 BAA
August 20 – August 26	Adrián Beltré	Texas Rangers	.433 (13–30); 7 Runs; 5 HR; 9 RBI; 1.533 OPS	Giancarlo Stanton	Miami Marlins	.286 (8–28); 7 Runs; 5 HR; 8 RBI; 1.167 OPS
August 27 – September 2	Josh Reddick	Oakland Athletics	.387 (12–31); 6 Runs; 3 HR; 10 RBI; 1.136 OPS	Pedro Alvarez	Pittsburgh Pirates	.458 (11–24); 6 Runs; 4 HR; 8 RBI; 1.542 OPS
September 3 – September 9	James Shields	Tampa Bay Rays	2–0; 1.59 ERA; 17 IP; K/BB 13/3; CG SHO; .127 BAA	Jay Bruce	Cincinnati Reds	.500 (11–22); 5 Runs; 4 HR; 9 RBI; 1.769 OPS
September 3 – September 9	B. J. Upton	Tampa Bay Rays	.400 (8–20); 7 Runs; 5 HR; 6 RBI; 1.678 OPS	Ricky Nolasco	Miami Marlins	2–0; 0.56 ERA; 16 IP; K/BB 10/1; CG SHO; .217 BAA
September 10 – September 16	Miguel Cabrera	Detroit Tigers	.407 (11–27); 7 Runs; 3 HR; 7 RBI; 1.243 OPS	Chris Nelson	Colorado Rockies	.560 (14–25); 6 Runs; 1 HR; 5 RBI; 1.417 OPS
September 17 – September 23	Ichiro Suzuki	New York Yankees	.600 (15–25); 7 Runs; 2 HR; 5 RBI; 6 SB; 1.590 OPS	Jason Motte	St. Louis Cardinals	5 Saves; 0.00 ERA; 4.2 IP; K/BB 10/0; .125 BAA
September 24 – September 30	Chris Davis	Baltimore Orioles	.423 (11–26); 8 Runs; 5 HR; 10 RBI; 1.521 OPS	Homer Bailey	Cincinnati Reds	1–0; 0.00 ERA; 9 IP; K/BB 10/1; .000 BAA; No-hitter
September 24 – September 30	Justin Verlander	Detroit Tigers	2–0; 1.20 ERA; 15 IP; K/BB 16/2; .224 BAA	Homer Bailey	Cincinnati Reds	1–0; 0.00 ERA; 9 IP; K/BB 10/1; .000 BAA; No-hitter

== 2011 ==
Week	American League			National League		
Week	Player(s)	Team(s)	Highlights	Player(s)	Team(s)	Highlights
March 31 – April 3	Carlos Quentin	Chicago White Sox	.545 (6–11); 3 Runs; 1 HR; 7 RBI; 1.674 OPS	Starlin Castro	Chicago Cubs	.615 (8–13); 4 Runs; 1.643 OPS
March 31 – April 3	Carlos Quentin	Chicago White Sox	.545 (6–11); 3 Runs; 1 HR; 7 RBI; 1.674 OPS	Jaime García	St. Louis Cardinals	1–0; 9/2 K/BB; Complete game shutout
April 4 – April 10	Paul Konerko	Chicago White Sox	.417 (10–24); 5 Runs; 3 HR; 8 RBI; 1.315 OPS	Prince Fielder	Milwaukee Brewers	.440 (11–25); 4 Runs; 2 HR; 11 RBI; 1.340 OPS
April 4 – April 10	Asdrúbal Cabrera	Cleveland Indians	.360 (9–25); 5 Runs; 3 HR; 8 RBI; 1.145 OPS	Prince Fielder	Milwaukee Brewers	.440 (11–25); 4 Runs; 2 HR; 11 RBI; 1.340 OPS
April 11 – April 17	Dan Haren	Los Angeles Angels	2–0; 15.1 IP; 1.17 ERA; 14/2 K/BB; CG SHO; .148 BAA	Lance Berkman	St. Louis Cardinals	.417 (10–24); 9 Runs; 6 HR; 12 RBI; 1.628 OPS
April 11 – April 17	Johnny Damon	Tampa Bay Rays	.375 (9–24); 4 Runs; 2 HR; 11 RBI; 1.025 OPS	Lance Berkman	St. Louis Cardinals	.417 (10–24); 9 Runs; 6 HR; 12 RBI; 1.628 OPS
April 18 – April 24	James Shields	Tampa Bay Rays	2–0; 0.50 ERA; 8 Hits; 16/3 K/BB; 2 CG; SHO; .138 BAA	Ryan Braun	Milwaukee Brewers	.480 (12–25); 9 Runs; 3 HR; 9 RBI; 1.373 OPS
April 25 – May 1	Ben Zobrist	Tampa Bay Rays	.440 (11–25); 8 Runs; 2 HR; 13 RBI; 1.404 OPS; 8 RBI game	Lance Berkman	St. Louis Cardinals	.458 (11–24); 4 Runs; 2 HR; 8 RBI; 1.313 OPS
May 2 – May 8	Francisco Liriano	Minnesota Twins	1–0; 2/6 K/BB; 1st career no-hitter	Gaby Sánchez	Florida Marlins	.464 (13–28); 6 Runs; 2 HR; 10 RBI; 1.317 OPS
May 2 – May 8	Justin Verlander	Detroit Tigers	1–0; 1.80 ERA; 12/5 K/BB; .160 BAA; 2nd career no-hitter	Gaby Sánchez	Florida Marlins	.464 (13–28); 6 Runs; 2 HR; 10 RBI; 1.317 OPS
May 9 – May 15	Victor Martinez	Detroit Tigers	.579 (11–19); 6 Runs; 2 HR; 11 RBI; 1.757 OPS	Martín Prado	Atlanta Braves	.462 (12–26); 7 Runs; 3 HR; 8 RBI; 1.363 OPS
May 16 – May 22	Alexei Ramírez	Chicago White Sox	.417 (10–24); 6 Runs; 6 2B; 1 HR; 9 RBI; 1.273 OPS	Daniel Hudson	Arizona Diamondbacks	2–0; 1.80 ERA; 15 IP; K/BB 12/2; .281 BAA
May 16 – May 22	Alexei Ramírez	Chicago White Sox	.417 (10–24); 6 Runs; 6 2B; 1 HR; 9 RBI; 1.273 OPS	Shaun Marcum	Milwaukee Brewers	2–0; 1.20 ERA; 15 IP; K/BB 12/3; .173 BAA
May 23 – May 29	Carl Crawford	Boston Red Sox	.423 (11–26); 9 Runs; 2 3B; 3 HR; 8 RBI; 1.464 OPS	Jay Bruce	Cincinnati Reds	.353 (12–34); 6 Runs; 4 HR; 13 RBI; 1.141 OPS
May 30 – June 5	David Ortiz	Boston Red Sox	.545 (12–22); 5 Runs; 2 HR; 6 RBI; 1.583 OPS	Albert Pujols	St. Louis Cardinals	.444 (12–27); 11 Runs; 5 HR; 10 RBI; 1.620 OPS
June 6 – June 12	Jacoby Ellsbury	Boston Red Sox	.467 (14–30); 10 Runs; 1 HR; 4 RBI; 1.167 OPS	Prince Fielder	Milwaukee Brewers	.500 (10–20); 7 Runs; 6 HR; 13 RBI; 2.143 OPS
June 13 – June 19	James Shields	Tampa Bay Rays	2–0; 18 IP; 2 CG; 0.00 ERA (1 run allowed); K/BB 15/3; .150 BAA	Justin Upton	Arizona Diamondbacks	.552 (16–29); 4 Runs; 1 HR; 7 RBI; 1.356 OPS
June 13 – June 19	Justin Verlander	Detroit Tigers	2–0; 18 IP; 2 CG; 0.50 ERA (1 run allowed); K/BB 17/1; .103 BAA	Justin Upton	Arizona Diamondbacks	.552 (16–29); 4 Runs; 1 HR; 7 RBI; 1.356 OPS
June 20 – June 26	Michael Young	Texas Rangers	.481 (13–27); 5 Runs; 4 HR; 9 RBI; 1.519 OPS	Clayton Kershaw	Los Angeles Dodgers	2–0; 18 IP; 2 CG (1 SHO); 1.00 ERA; K/BB 22/1; .138 BAA
June 27 – July 3	Gio González	Oakland Athletics	2–0; 15 IP; 0.60 ERA; K/BB 16/6; .120 BAA	Aramis Ramírez	Chicago Cubs	.393 (11–28); 9 Runs; 6 HR; 10 RBI; 1.491 OPS
June 27 – July 3	José Bautista	Toronto Blue Jays	.391 (9–23); 6 Runs; 4 HR; 8 RBI; 1.543 OPS	Aramis Ramírez	Chicago Cubs	.393 (11–28); 9 Runs; 6 HR; 10 RBI; 1.491 OPS
July 4 – July 10	Derek Jeter	New York Yankees	.370 (10–27); 3 Runs; 1 HR; 4 RBI; 1.022 OPS; 3000th career hit	Raúl Ibañez	Philadelphia Phillies	.310 (9–29); 6 Runs; 3 HR; 13 RBI; 0.989 OPS
July 11 – July 17	Nick Markakis	Baltimore Orioles	.429 (6–14); 5 Runs; 2 HR; 4 RBI; 1.500 OPS	Jeff Karstens	Pittsburgh Pirates	1–0; 9 IP (SHO); 0.00 ERA; K/BB 2/0; .167 BAA
July 18 – July 24	Hideki Matsui	Oakland Athletics	.571 (12–21); 4 Runs; 2 HR; 7 RBI; 1.543 OPS; 500th US/Japan HR	Cameron Maybin	Florida Marlins	.538 (14–26); 8 Runs; 1 HR; 6 RBI; 8 SB; 1.248 OPS
July 18 – July 24	Hideki Matsui	Oakland Athletics	.571 (12–21); 4 Runs; 2 HR; 7 RBI; 1.543 OPS; 500th US/Japan HR	Justin Upton	Arizona Diamondbacks	.519 (14–27); 6 Runs; 2 HR; 11 RBI; 8 XBH; 1.552 OPS
July 25 – July 31	Billy Butler	Kansas City Royals	.406 (13–32); 6 Runs; 5 HR; 12 RBI; 1.349 OPS	Joey Votto	Cincinnati Reds	.385 (10–26); 7 Runs; 4 HR; 9 RBI; 1.390 OPS
July 25 – July 31	Ervin Santana	Los Angeles Angels	1–0; 10/1 K/BB; 1st career no-hitter	Joey Votto	Cincinnati Reds	.385 (10–26); 7 Runs; 4 HR; 9 RBI; 1.390 OPS
August 1 – August 7	Ricky Romero	Toronto Blue Jays	2–0; 16 IP; 1.69 ERA; K/BB 12/4; .098 BAA	Starlin Castro	Chicago Cubs	.515 (17–33); 10 Runs; 2 HR; 7 RBI; 1.300 OPS
August 8 – August 14	J. J. Hardy	Baltimore Orioles	.323 (10–31); 6 Runs; 4 HR; 10 RBI; 1.097 OPS	Jay Bruce	Cincinnati Reds	.440 (11–25); 9 Runs; 5 HR; 15 RBI; 1.601 OPS
August 15 – August 21	Jim Thome	Minnesota Twins	.429 (6–14); 4 Runs; 3 HR; 7 RBI; 1.601 OPS; 600th career home run	Nick Hundley	San Diego Padres	.500 (12–24); 8 Runs; 8 XBH; 4 3B; 1 HR; 4 RBI; 1.603 OPS
August 15 – August 21	Jim Thome	Minnesota Twins	.429 (6–14); 4 Runs; 3 HR; 7 RBI; 1.601 OPS; 600th career home run	Ryan Zimmerman	Washington Nationals	.500 (12–24); 5 Runs; 3 HR; 7 RBI; 1.458 OPS
August 22 – August 28	Adrián González	Boston Red Sox	.393 (11–28); 8 Runs; 5 HR; 9 RBI; 1.416 OPS	Carlos González	Colorado Rockies	.481 (13–27); 9 Runs; 3 HR; 10 RBI; 1.422 OPS
August 29 – September 4	Austin Jackson	Detroit Tigers	.529 (18–34); 13 Runs; 8 XBH; 2 HR; 5 RBI; 1.513 OPS	David Wright	New York Mets	.500 (13–26); 6 Runs; 1 HR; 7 RBI; 1.401 OPS
September 5 – September 11	C. J. Wilson	Texas Rangers	2–0; 17 IP; 0.00 ERA; K/BB 17/4; .179 BAA	Jason Bay	New York Mets	.481 (13–27); 4 Runs; 2 HR; 10 RBI; 1.389 OPS
September 12 – September 18	Erick Aybar	Los Angeles Angels	.455 (10–22); 8 Runs; 7 XBH; 3 HR; 5 RBI; 1.565 OPS	Pablo Sandoval	San Francisco Giants	.440 (11–25); 5 Runs; 7 XBH; 4 HR; 10 RBI; 1.601 OPS
September 12 – September 18	Justin Verlander	Detroit Tigers	2–0; 15 IP; 0.00 ERA; K/BB 12/5; .176 BAA	Pablo Sandoval	San Francisco Giants	.440 (11–25); 5 Runs; 7 XBH; 4 HR; 10 RBI; 1.601 OPS
September 19 – September 25	Mariano Rivera	New York Yankees	0–0; 2 Saves; 0.00 ERA; 3 IP; K/BB 3/1; .111 BAA; Became all-time saves leader	Matt Kemp	Los Angeles Dodgers	.423 (11–26); 9 Runs; 7 XBH; 3 HR; 7 RBI; 1.368 OPS

== 2010 ==
Week	American League			National League		
Week	Player(s)	Team(s)	Highlights	Player(s)	Team(s)	Highlights
April 4 – April 11	Miguel Cabrera	Detroit Tigers	.522 (12–23); 2 HR; 8 RBI; 6 Runs	Roy Halladay	Philadelphia Phillies	2–0; 16 IP; 1 ER; 2 BB; 17 Ks
April 12 – April 18	Shin-Soo Choo	Cleveland Indians	.579 (11–19); 3 HR; 11 RBI; .680 OBP	Ubaldo Jiménez	Colorado Rockies	1–0; 9 IP; 7 Ks; No-hitter
April 19 – April 25	Kendry Morales	Los Angeles Angels	.542 (13–24); 3 HR; 10 RBI; 7 Runs; 1 K	Mark Reynolds	Arizona Diamondbacks	.421 (8–19); 3 HR; 11 RBI; 5 Runs
April 26 – May 2	Paul Konerko	Chicago White Sox	.316 (6–19); 4 HR; 10 RBI; 5 Runs	David Freese	St. Louis Cardinals	.462 (12–26); 3 HR; 11 RBI; 4 Runs
May 3 – May 9	Dallas Braden	Oakland Athletics	1–1; 16 IP; 3 ER; 0 BB; 9 Ks; Perfect game	Jayson Werth	Philadelphia Phillies	.360 (9–25); 4 HR; 9 RBI; 6 Runs; 4 2B
May 10 – May 16	José Bautista	Toronto Blue Jays	.444 (8–18); 4 HR; 8 RBI; 8 Runs	Martín Prado	Atlanta Braves	.367 (11–30); 3 HR; 11 RBI; 4 Runs
May 17 – May 23	Nelson Cruz	Texas Rangers	.458 (11–24); 2 HR; 12 RBI; 5 Runs; 5 2B	Adrián González	San Diego Padres	.444 (12–27); 2 HR; 9 RBI; 6 Runs; 3 2B
May 24 – May 30	Robinson Canó	New York Yankees	.565 (13–23); 9 RBI; 5 Runs; 4 2B	Roy Halladay	Philadelphia Phillies	1–1; 14.2 IP; 12 Ks; Perfect game
May 31 – June 6	Armando Galarraga	Detroit Tigers	1–0; CG SHO; 1 H; 88 P; Near-perfect game	Colby Rasmus	St. Louis Cardinals	.500 (11–22); 3 HR; 9 RBI; 8 Runs; 4 multi-hit games
June 7 – June 13	Josh Hamilton	Texas Rangers	.370 (10–27); 4 HR; 13 RBI; 7 Runs; 1.322 OPS	Stephen Strasburg	Washington Nationals	2–0; 2.19 ERA; 22 Ks; 14 strikeouts in his major league debut
June 7 – June 13	Colby Lewis	Texas Rangers	2–0; 1.80 ERA; 15 IP; K/BB 15/4	Stephen Strasburg	Washington Nationals	2–0; 2.19 ERA; 22 Ks; 14 strikeouts in his major league debut
June 14 – June 20	Carl Crawford	Tampa Bay Rays	.429 (9–21); 9 Runs; 2 3B; 3 SB, 1.381 OPS	Matt Holliday	St. Louis Cardinals	.435 (10–23); 6 Runs; 4 HR; 8 RBI; 1.480 OPS
June 21 – June 27	Carlos Quentin	Chicago White Sox	.389 (7–18); 6 Runs; 4 HR; 11 RBI; 1.633 OPS	Edwin Jackson	Arizona Diamondbacks	1–0; 9 IP; 6 Ks; No-hitter
June 28 – July 4	Jim Thome	Minnesota Twins	.400 (8–20); 7 Runs; 4 HR; 8 RBI; 1.628 OPS	Rafael Furcal	Los Angeles Dodgers	.538 (14–26); 9 Runs; 2 HR; 5 RBI; 1.495 OPS
July 5 – July 11	Miguel Cabrera	Detroit Tigers	.435 (10–23); 5 Runs; 2 HR; 8 RBI; 1.395 OPS	Buster Posey	San Francisco Giants	.556 (15–27); 9 Runs; 5 HR; 14 RBI; 1.816 OPS
July 12 – July 18	Bengie Molina	Texas Rangers	.417 (5–12); 2 HR; 6 RBI; 1.583 OPS; hit for cycle	Ryan Howard	Philadelphia Phillies	.400 (6–15); 4 Runs; 4 HR; 8 RBI; 1.674 OPS
July 19 – July 25	Luke Scott	Baltimore Orioles	.481 (13–27); 6 Runs; 4 HR; 8 RBI; 1.537 OPS	Aramis Ramírez	Chicago Cubs	.360 (9–25); 5 Runs; 4 HR; 10 RBI; 1.233 OPS
July 26 – August 1	José Bautista	Toronto Blue Jays	.545 (12–22); 8 Runs; 5 HR; 13 RBI; 1.993 OPS	Carlos González	Colorado Rockies	.533 (16–30); 10 Runs; 4 HR; 7 RBI; 1.625 OPS; hit for cycle
July 26 – August 1	Matt Garza	Tampa Bay Rays	1–0; 16 IP; 2.25 ERA; K/BB 15/2; No-hitter	Carlos González	Colorado Rockies	.533 (16–30); 10 Runs; 4 HR; 7 RBI; 1.625 OPS; hit for cycle
August 2 – August 8	Trevor Cahill	Oakland Athletics	2–0; 17 IP; 2 Runs (0 ER); K/BB 6/4; CG SHO	Ryan Braun	Milwaukee Brewers	.538 (14–26); 8 Runs; 4 RBI; 1.125 OPS
August 9 – August 15	Bobby Abreu	Los Angeles Angels	.524 (11–21); 5 Runs; 2 HR; 5 RBI; 1.568 OPS	Mike Stanton	Florida Marlins	.583 (14–24); 5 Runs; 4 HR; 8 RBI; 1.921 OPS
August 16 – August 22	Evan Longoria	Tampa Bay Rays	.393 (11–28); 6 Runs; 3 HR; 12 RBI; 1.329 OPS	Omar Infante	Atlanta Braves	.433 (13–30); 9 Runs; 3 HR; 5 RBI; 1.385 OPS
August 16 – August 22	Robinson Canó	New York Yankees	.333 (9–27); 7 Runs; 4 HR; 13 RBI; 1.252 OPS	Omar Infante	Atlanta Braves	.433 (13–30); 9 Runs; 3 HR; 5 RBI; 1.385 OPS
August 23 – August 29	José Bautista	Toronto Blue Jays	.500 (10–20); 7 Runs; 4 HR; 7 RBI; 2.005 OPS	Carlos González	Colorado Rockies	.545 (12–22); 8 Runs; 4 HR; 11 RBI; 1.956 OPS
August 30 – September 5	Mark Teixeira	New York Yankees	.476 (10–21); 5 Runs; 2 HR; 8 RBI; 1.538 OPS	Hunter Pence	Houston Astros	.500 (11–22); 5 Runs; 2 HR; 9 RBI; 1.451 OPS
September 6 – September 12	Brayan Peña	Kansas City Royals	.435 (10–23); 3 Runs; 1 HR; 9 RBI; 1.130 OPS	Troy Tulowitzki	Colorado Rockies	.370 (10–27); 9 Runs; 8 XBH; 6 HR; 11 RBI; 1.562 OPS
September 13 – September 19	Shin-Soo Choo	Cleveland Indians	.500 (10–20); 7 Runs; 4 HR; 11 RBI; 1.765 OPS	Troy Tulowitzki	Colorado Rockies	.346 (9–26); 9 Runs; 6 HR; 17 RBI; 1.470 OPS
September 20 – September 26	Ichiro Suzuki	Seattle Mariners	.444 (12–27); collected 200th hit for 10 straight seasons	Pedro Alvarez	Pittsburgh Pirates	.417 (10–24); 4 Runs; 2 HR; 13 RBI; 1.233 OPS
September 27 – October 3	Edwin Encarnación	Toronto Blue Jays	.400 (8–20); 6 Runs; 5 HR; 11 RBI; 1.585 OPS	Jay Bruce	Cincinnati Reds	.444 (8–18); 5 Runs; 4 HR; 5 RBI; 1.611 OPS; clinched Reds playoff berth with walk-off HR

== 2009 ==
Week	American League			National League		
Week	Player(s)	Team(s)	Highlights	Player(s)	Team(s)	Highlights
April 5 – April 12	Evan Longoria	Tampa Bay Rays	.481 (13–27) 5 HR; 10 RBI; 1.185 SLG	Josh Johnson	Florida Marlins	2–0; 15.2 IP; 1 ER; 15 Ks
April 13 – April 19	Zack Greinke	Kansas City Royals	2–0; 14 IP; 0 ER; 2 BB; 19 Ks	Andre Ethier	Los Angeles Dodgers	.391 (9–23); 4 HR; 12 RBI; 8 Runs
April 13 – April 19	Ian Kinsler	Texas Rangers	.556 (15–27); 6 RBI; 9 Runs; Hit for cycle/6 H game	Andre Ethier	Los Angeles Dodgers	.391 (9–23); 4 HR; 12 RBI; 8 Runs
April 20 – April 26	Mike Lowell	Boston Red Sox	.435 (11–23) 6 XBH; 11 RBI; 4 Runs	Albert Pujols	St. Louis Cardinals	.450 (9–20); 3 HR; 11 RBI; 7 Runs
April 27 – May 3	Evan Longoria	Tampa Bay Rays	.379 (11–29) 6 XBH; 14 RBI; 9 Runs	Jorge Cantú	Florida Marlins	.346 (9–26); 4 HR; 14 RBI; 6 Runs
May 4 – May 10	Johnny Damon	New York Yankees	.419 (13–31) 5 HR; 15 RBI; 7 Runs	Ryan Braun	Milwaukee Brewers	.458 (11–24); 3 HR; 12 RBI; 8 Runs
May 11 – May 17	Roy Halladay	Toronto Blue Jays	2–0; 16 IP; 2 ER; 1 BB; 13 Ks	Raúl Ibañez	Philadelphia Phillies	.481 (13–27); 4 HR; 12 RBI; 9 Runs
May 18 – May 24	Joe Mauer	Minnesota Twins	.458 (11–24); 4 HR; 13 RBI; 12 Runs	Miguel Tejada	Houston Astros	.522 (12–23); 3 HR; 5 Runs; 0 K
May 25 – May 31	Luke Scott	Baltimore Orioles	.444 (8–18); 6 HR; 14 RBI; 7 Runs	Adrián González	San Diego Padres	.333 (6–18); 4 HR; 10 RBI; 6 Runs
May 25 – May 31	Luke Scott	Baltimore Orioles	.444 (8–18); 6 HR; 14 RBI; 7 Runs	Ryan Howard	Philadelphia Phillies	.333 (8–24); 4 HR; 10 RBI; 1.000 SLG
June 1 – June 7	Lyle Overbay	Toronto Blue Jays	.533 (8–15); 6 XBH; 8 RBI; 1.200 SLG	Ian Stewart	Colorado Rockies	.480 (12–25); 4 HR; 12 RBI; 9 Runs
June 8 – June 14	José Contreras	Chicago White Sox	2–0; 16 IP; 0 ER; 3 H; 3 BB; 11 Ks	Mark Reynolds	Arizona Diamondbacks	.414 (10–24); 3 HR; 9 RBI; 5 2B
June 8 – June 14	José Contreras	Chicago White Sox	2–0; 16 IP; 0 ER; 3 H; 3 BB; 11 Ks	Huston Street	Colorado Rockies	5 Saves; 4.2 IP; 1 ER; 3 H; 1 BB; 8 Ks
June 15 – June 21	B. J. Upton	Tampa Bay Rays	.429 (12–28); 5 XBH; 9 RBI; 6 Runs	Albert Pujols	St. Louis Cardinals	.389 (7–18); 4 HR; 11 RBI; 6 Runs (1,000th run)
June 22 – June 28	Jermaine Dye	Chicago White Sox	.500 (12–24); 3 HR; 6 RBI; 25 TB	Chad Gaudin	San Diego Padres	2–0; 15 IP; 2 ER; 3 BB; 20 Ks
June 22 – June 28	Mariano Rivera	New York Yankees	3 Saves; 3 IP; 0 ER; 1 H; 0 BB; (500th save)	Hanley Ramírez	Florida Marlins	.385 (10–26); 3 HR; 15 RBI; 2 grand slams
June 29 – July 5	Justin Morneau	Minnesota Twins	.480 (12–25); 4 HR; 8 RBI; .536 OBP	Martín Prado	Atlanta Braves	.577 (15–26); 8 2B; 6 RBI; 8 Runs
July 6 – July 12	Josh Beckett	Boston Red Sox	2–0; 15.2 IP; 2 ER; 1 BB; 11 Ks	Ryan Ludwick	St. Louis Cardinals	.481 (13–27); 4 HR; 15 RBI; 6 Runs
July 6 – July 12	Josh Beckett	Boston Red Sox	2–0; 15.2 IP; 2 ER; 1 BB; 11 Ks	Jonathan Sánchez	San Francisco Giants	1–0; 11 IP; 0 ER; 0 BB; 12 Ks; No-hitter
July 13 – July 19	Jim Thome	Chicago White Sox	.500 (5–10); .615 OBP; 1.200 SLG; 7 RBI game	Yunel Escobar	Atlanta Braves	.500 (7–14); 5 XBH; 8 RBI; 1.143 SLG
July 20 – July 26	Mark Buehrle	Chicago White Sox	1–0; 9 IP; 6 Ks; Perfect game	Andre Ethier	Los Angeles Dodgers	.545 (12–22); 7 XBH; 6 RBI; 8 Runs
July 27 – August 2	Kendry Morales	Los Angeles Angels	.423 (11–26); 5 HR; 13 RBI; 7 Runs	Tim Lincecum	San Francisco Giants	2–0; 17 IP; 0 ER; 4 BB; 23 Ks (15 K game)
July 27 – August 2	Kendry Morales	Los Angeles Angels	.423 (11–26); 5 HR; 13 RBI; 7 Runs	Josh Willingham	Washington Nationals	.435 (10–23); 3 HR; 11 RBI; 2 grand slam game
August 3 – August 9	Billy Butler	Kansas City Royals	.538 (14–26); 7 XBH; 10 RBI; 6 Runs	Mark Reynolds	Arizona Diamondbacks	.448(13–29); 6 HR; 10 RBI; 32 TB
August 10 – August 16	Mark Ellis	Oakland Athletics	.571 (12–21); 4 XBH; 11 RBI; .857 SLG	Adrián González	San Diego Padres	.633 (19–31); 3 HR; 8 RBI; 10 Runs; 6 H game
August 17 – August 23	Michael Young	Texas Rangers	.500 (15–30); 8 RBI; 7 Runs; 4 XBH	Jayson Werth	Philadelphia Phillies	.440 (11–25); 5 HR; 9 RBI; 7 Runs
August 24 – August 30	Zack Greinke	Kansas City Royals	2–0; 17 IP; 2 ER; 2 BB; 20 Ks (15 K game); 1 hitter	Ryan Howard	Philadelphia Phillies	.393 (11–28); 5 HR; 12 RBI; 24 TB
August 31 – September 6	Adam Lind	Toronto Blue Jays	.321 (9–28); 3 HR; 12 RBI (8 RBI game); 9 Runs	Seth Smith	Colorado Rockies	.542 (13–24); 4 HR; 12 RBI; 10 Runs; 30 TB
August 31 – September 6	Evan Longoria	Tampa Bay Rays	.467 (14–30); 3 HR; 10 RBI; 10 Runs	Seth Smith	Colorado Rockies	.542 (13–24); 4 HR; 12 RBI; 10 Runs; 30 TB
September 7 – September 13	Billy Butler	Kansas City Royals	.419 (13–31); 5 2B; 12 RBI; 24 TB	Javier Vázquez	Atlanta Braves	2–0; 16 IP; 2 ER; 4 BB; 17 Ks
September 14 – September 20	Michael Cuddyer	Minnesota Twins	.292 (7–24); 4 HR; 11 RBI; 5 Runs	Troy Tulowitzki	Colorado Rockies	.391 (9–23); 4 HR; 5 RBI; 8 Runs
September 21 – September 27	Marlon Byrd	Texas Rangers	.320 (8–25); 3 HR; 11 RBI; 7 Runs	Joey Votto	Cincinnati Reds	.560 (14–25); 10 2B; 8 RBI; 11 Runs
September 28 – October 4	Jason Kubel	Minnesota Twins	.423 (11–26); 3 HR; 12 RBI; 5 Runs	Homer Bailey	Cincinnati Reds	2–0; 13 IP; 1 ER; 4 BB; 14 Ks
September 28 – October 4	Delmon Young	Minnesota Twins	.448 (13–29); 3 HR; 12 RBI; 6 Runs	Homer Bailey	Cincinnati Reds	2–0; 13 IP; 1 ER; 4 BB; 14 Ks

== 2008 ==
Week	American League			National League		
Week	Player(s)	Team(s)	Highlights	Player(s)	Team(s)	Highlights
March 31 – April 6	A. J. Pierzynski	Chicago White Sox	.500 (10–20); 7 Runs; 2 HR; 7 RBI; 1.565 OPS	Xavier Nady	Pittsburgh Pirates	.385 (10–26); 3 HR; 9 RBI; 6 Runs
April 7 – April 13	Brian Bannister	Kansas City Royals	2–0; 14 IP; 2 ER; 9 Ks	Matt Holliday	Colorado Rockies	.480 (12–25); 5 XBH; 10 RBI; 6 Runs
April 7 – April 13	Raúl Ibañez	Seattle Mariners	.370 (10–27); 4 HR; 11 RBI; 7 Runs	Matt Holliday	Colorado Rockies	.480 (12–25); 5 XBH; 10 RBI; 6 Runs
April 14 – April 20	Miguel Cabrera	Detroit Tigers	.429 (12–28); 6 XBH; 12 RBI; 7 Runs	Conor Jackson	Arizona Diamondbacks	.480 (12–25); 3 HR; 10 RBI; 10 Runs; 2 3B
April 14 – April 20	Manny Ramirez	Boston Red Sox	.417 (10–24); 4 HR; 8 RBI; 7 Runs	Conor Jackson	Arizona Diamondbacks	.480 (12–25); 3 HR; 10 RBI; 10 Runs; 2 3B
April 21 – April 27	James Shields	Tampa Bay Rays	2–0; 16 IP; 2 ER; 3 BB; 12 Ks	Lance Berkman	Houston Astros	.455 (10–22); 4 HR; 12 RBI; 7 Runs
April 28 – May 4	Jack Cust	Oakland Athletics	.500 (10–20); 3 HR; 4 RBI; 6 Runs	Matt Kemp	Los Angeles Dodgers	.407 (11–27); 4 2B; 11 RBI; 7 Runs
May 5 – May 11	Kevin Youkilis	Boston Red Sox	.375 (12–32); 5 HR; 10 RBI; 8 Runs	Lance Berkman	Houston Astros	.682 (15–22); 6 XBH; 10 Runs; .741 OBP; 5 H game
May 12 – May 18	José Guillén	Kansas City Royals	.458 (11–24); 7 XBH; 13 RBI; 4 Runs	Alfonso Soriano	Chicago Cubs	.516 (16–31); 7 HR; 14 RBI; 10 Runs; 5 H game
May 19 – May 25	Jon Lester	Boston Red Sox	1–1; 14 IP; 3 ER; 12 Ks; No-hitter	Bengie Molina	San Francisco Giants	.652 (16–23); 6 2B; 9 RBI; 5 Runs
May 19 – May 25	Magglio Ordóñez	Detroit Tigers	.478 (11–23); 3 HR; 9 RBI; 7 Runs	Bengie Molina	San Francisco Giants	.652 (16–23); 6 2B; 9 RBI; 5 Runs
May 26 – June 1	Mariano Rivera	New York Yankees	3 Saves; 5 IP; 0 ER; 1 H; 2 BB; 7 Ks	Chase Utley	Philadelphia Phillies	.391 (9–23); 5 HR; 14 RBI; 9 Runs
June 2 – June 8	Milton Bradley	Texas Rangers	.538 (14–26); 5 HR; 9 RBI; 12 Runs	Chipper Jones	Atlanta Braves	.579 (11–19); 3 HR; 6 RBI (400th HR)
June 2 – June 8	Joe Crede	Chicago White Sox	.611 (11–18); 5 HR; 12 RBI; 9 Runs	Chipper Jones	Atlanta Braves	.579 (11–19); 3 HR; 6 RBI (400th HR)
June 9 – June 15	CC Sabathia	Cleveland Indians	2–0; 17 IP; 3 ER; 1 BB; 15 Ks	Ryan Doumit	Pittsburgh Pirates	.400 (10–25); 4 HR; 7 RBI; 8 Runs
June 9 – June 15	CC Sabathia	Cleveland Indians	2–0; 17 IP; 3 ER; 1 BB; 15 Ks	Ricky Nolasco	Florida Marlins	2–0; 14.2 IP; 2 ER; 2 BB; 15 Ks
June 16 – June 22	Jermaine Dye	Chicago White Sox	.417 (10–24); 5 HR; 13 RBI; 7 Runs; 1 K	Jeff Baker	Colorado Rockies	.435 (10–23); 4 HR; 7 RBI; 8 Runs
June 23 – June 29	Evan Longoria	Tampa Bay Rays	.433 (13–30); 3 HR; 10 RBI; 7 Runs; 5 2B	Jonathan Sánchez	San Francisco Giants	2–0; 14.2 IP; 2 ER; 3 BB; 14 Ks
June 30 – July 6	Aubrey Huff	Baltimore Orioles	.345 (10–29); 3 HR; 9 RBI; 1 K	J. J. Hardy	Milwaukee Brewers	.600 (18–30); 6 HR; 12 RBI; 8 Runs; 41 TB
July 7 – July 13	Matt Joyce	Detroit Tigers	.409 (9–22); 4 HR; 6 RBI; 6 Runs; 4 2B	Mike Pelfrey	New York Mets	2–0; 15 IP; 0 ER; 0 BB; 10 Ks
July 14 – July 20	Luke Scott	Baltimore Orioles	.538 (7–13); 3 HR; 6 RBI; 4 Runs	Willie Harris	Washington Nationals	.583 (7–12); 7 RBI; 5 Runs; .688 OBP
July 21 – July 27	Miguel Cabrera	Detroit Tigers	.464 (13–28); 3 2B; 13 RBI; 2 Runs	Conor Jackson	Arizona Diamondbacks	.542 (13–24); 3 HR; 7 RBI; 9 Runs
July 28 – August 3	Mike Avilés	Kansas City Royals	.577 (15–26); 6 XBH; 7 Runs; 1 K	Ryan Ludwick	St. Louis Cardinals	.538 (14–26); 4 HR; 8 RBI; 7 Runs
July 28 – August 3	Xavier Nady	New York Yankees	.526 (10–19); 3 HR; 10 RBI; 7 Runs	Ryan Ludwick	St. Louis Cardinals	.538 (14–26); 4 HR; 8 RBI; 7 Runs
August 4 – August 10	Marlon Byrd	Texas Rangers	.550 (11–20); 3 HR; 11 RBI; 7 Runs	Carlos Lee	Houston Astros	.571 (16–28); 6 XBH; 8 RBI; 9 Runs
August 11 – August 17	Melvin Mora	Baltimore Orioles	.563 (18–32); 8 XBH; 13 RBI; 8 Runs; 5 H game	Johan Santana	New York Mets	2–0; 16 IP; 3 ER; 2 BB; 13 Ks
August 11 – August 17	Javier Vázquez	Chicago White Sox	2–0; 16 IP; 1 ER; 1 BB; 18 Ks	Ty Wigginton	Houston Astros	.571 (16–28); 4 HR; 11 RBI; 9 Runs
August 18 – August 24	Francisco Rodríguez	Los Angeles Angels	3 Saves; 4 IP; 0 ER; 5 Ks	Albert Pujols	St. Louis Cardinals	.579 (11–19); 6 XBH; 10 RBI; 1 K
August 25 – August 31	Aubrey Huff	Baltimore Orioles	.478 (11–23); 6 XBH; 7 RBI; 5 Runs	Cristian Guzmán	Washington Nationals	.522 (16–29); 5 XBH; 6 RBI; Hit for cycle
August 25 – August 31	Aubrey Huff	Baltimore Orioles	.478 (11–23); 6 XBH; 7 RBI; 5 Runs	Bronson Arroyo	Cincinnati Reds	2–0; 16 IP; 3 ER; 2 BB; 8 Ks
September 1 – September 7	Alex Ríos	Toronto Blue Jays	.414 (12–29); 3 HR; 8 RBI; 2 3B	Andre Ethier	Los Angeles Dodgers	.650 (13–20); 6 XBH; 8 RBI; 10 Runs
September 1 – September 7	Alex Ríos	Toronto Blue Jays	.414 (12–29); 3 HR; 8 RBI; 2 3B	Roy Oswalt	Houston Astros	2–0; 17.1 IP; 0 ER; 2 BB; 9 Ks; 1 hitter
September 8 – September 14	Asdrúbal Cabrera	Cleveland Indians	.455 (10–22); 4 XBH; 8 RBI; 1 K	Carlos Zambrano	Chicago Cubs	1–0; 9 IP; 1 BB; 10 Ks; No-hitter
September 8 – September 14	Carlos Gómez	Minnesota Twins	.333 (7–21); 3 XBH; 10 RBI; 2 Runs	Carlos Zambrano	Chicago Cubs	1–0; 9 IP; 1 BB; 10 Ks; No-hitter
September 15 – September 21	Carlos Peña	Tampa Bay Rays	.368 (7–19); 3 HR; 11 RBI; 5 Runs	Prince Fielder	Milwaukee Brewers	.462 (12–26); 3 HR; 11 RBI; 6 Runs
September 22 – September 28	Hank Blalock	Texas Rangers	.400 (10–22); 4 HR; 9 RBI; 8 Runs	Albert Pujols	St. Louis Cardinals	.588 (10–17); 3 HR; 10 RBI; .680 OBP
September 22 – September 28	Ben Zobrist	Tampa Bay Rays	.455 (10–22); 4 HR; 7 RBI; 8 Runs	Albert Pujols	St. Louis Cardinals	.588 (10–17); 3 HR; 10 RBI; .680 OBP

== See also ==
- Baseball awards § Monthly and weekly awards
- List of MLB awards
