= List of Major League Baseball single-game runs scored leaders =

In Major League Baseball, players have scored six or more runs in one game 17 times. This record has been achieved by 16 players, the most recent being Nick Kurtz of the Athletics on July 25, 2025. Mel Ott is the only player to accomplish the feat twice, doing so nearly a decade apart.

Three players — Ott, Cap Anson, and King Kelly — have been elected to the Baseball Hall of Fame. A player's team has never lost a game in which he scored six runs. Only one of the players who have scored six runs are currently active in MLB.

Guy Hecker scored seven runs for the Louisville Colonels against the Baltimore Orioles in the American Association which was one of the two Major Leagues at the time, on August 15, 1886, setting the record for professional baseball. Hecker is also the only pitcher to score as many as six runs in a game. In addition, Hecker collected six hits, another unique accomplishment for a pitcher.

Shawn Green's six run game set the Major League record for total bases (19) and tied the Major League records for home runs (4) and extra-base hits (5). These records were tied by Nick Kurtz.

Six players on this list also collected six hits on their way to scoring six runs: King Kelly, Ginger Beaumont, Edgardo Alfonzo, Shawn Green, Joe Randa, and Nick Kurtz.

The record for runs in a postseason game is five.

== Key ==
Player	Name of the player
Date	Date of the six run game
Team	The player's team at the time of the game
Opposing team	The team against whom the player scored six runs
Score	Final score of the game, with the player's team score listed first
Career runs	The number of runs the player scored in his MLB career
†	Elected to the Baseball Hall of Fame
*	The player is still active.

== Players ==
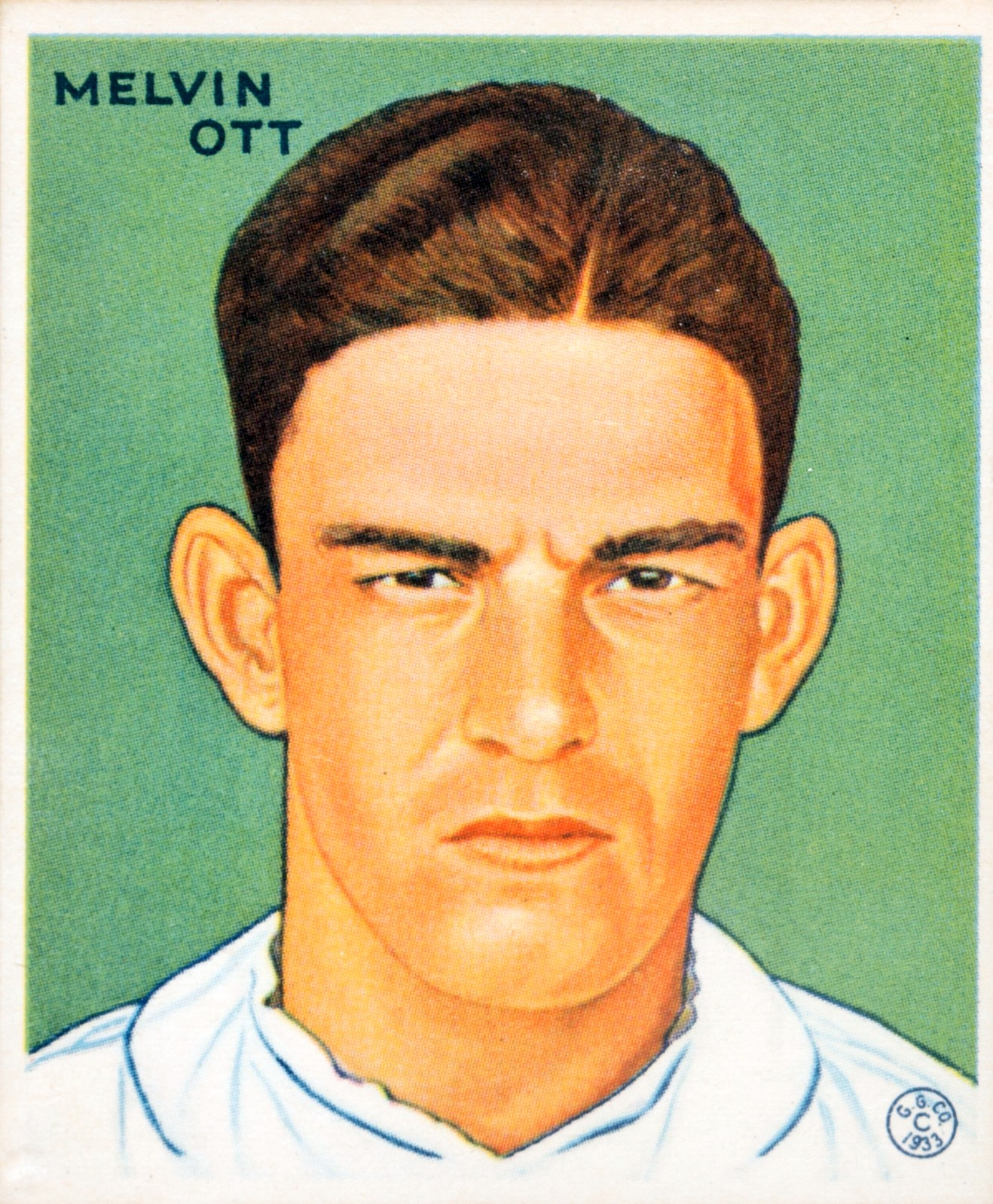
Mel Ott is the only player to score six runs twice. He did so nearly a decade apart.

Player	Date	Team	Opposing team	Score	Career runs	Ref(s)
Jim Whitney	June 9, 1883	Boston Beaneaters	Detroit Wolverines	30–8	316	
Cap Anson†	August 24, 1886	Chicago White Stockings	Boston Beaneaters	18–6	1,719	
Mike Tiernan	June 15, 1887	New York Giants	Philadelphia Phillies	29–1	1,313	
King Kelly†	August 27, 1887	Boston Beaneaters	Pittsburgh Alleghenys	28–14	1,357	
Ezra Sutton	August 27, 1887	Boston Beaneaters	Pittsburgh Alleghenys	28–14	739	
Jimmy Ryan	July 25, 1894	Chicago Colts	Pittsburgh Pirates	24–6	1,642	
Bobby Lowe	May 3, 1895	Boston Beaneaters	Washington Senators	27–11	1,131	
Ginger Beaumont	July 22, 1899	Pittsburgh Pirates	Philadelphia Phillies	18–4	955	
Mel Ott†	August 4, 1934	New York Giants	Philadelphia Phillies	21–4	1,859	
Mel Ott (2)†	April 30, 1944	New York Giants	Brooklyn Dodgers	26–8	1,859	
Johnny Pesky	May 8, 1946	Boston Red Sox	Chicago White Sox	14–10	867	
Frank Torre	September 2, 1957	Milwaukee Braves	Chicago Cubs	23–10	150	
Spike Owen	August 21, 1986	Boston Red Sox	Cleveland Indians	24–5	587	
Edgardo Alfonzo	August 30, 1999	New York Mets	Houston Astros	17–1	777	
Shawn Green	May 23, 2002	Los Angeles Dodgers	Milwaukee Brewers	16–3	1,129	
Joe Randa	September 9, 2004	Kansas City Royals	Detroit Tigers	26–5	697	
Nick Kurtz^{*}	July 25, 2025	Athletics	Houston Astros	15–3	90	

== See also ==
- List of Major League Baseball runs records
