= Bobby Lowe =

American baseball player, coach, and scout (1865–1951)

- Portrait by Elmer Chickering, 1902
- Second baseman / Manager
- Born: July 10, 1865; Pittsburgh, Pennsylvania, U.S.
- Died: December 8, 1951 (aged 86); Detroit, Michigan, U.S.
- Batted: Right Threw: Right

MLB debut
- April 19, 1890, for the Boston Beaneaters

Last MLB appearance
- October 6, 1907, for the Detroit Tigers

MLB statistics
- Batting average: .273
- Home runs: 71
- Runs batted in: 989
- Stats at Baseball Reference

Teams
- As player: Boston Beaneaters (1890–1901); Chicago Orphans / Cubs (1902–1903); Pittsburgh Pirates (1904); Detroit Tigers (1904–1907); As manager: Detroit Tigers (1904)

Career highlights and awards
- First player to hit four home runs in one game on May 30, 1894

Robert Lincoln Lowe (July 10, 1865 – December 8, 1951), nicknamed "Link", was an American Major League Baseball (MLB) player, coach, and scout. He played for the Boston Beaneaters (1890–1901), Chicago Cubs (1902–1903), Pittsburgh Pirates (1904), and Detroit Tigers (1904–1907). Lowe was the first player in Major League history to hit four home runs in a game, a feat which he accomplished in May 1894. He also tied or set Major League records with 17 total bases in a single game and six hits in a single game. Lowe was a versatile player who played at every position but was principally a second baseman. When he retired in 1907, his career fielding average of .953 at second base was the highest in Major League history.

Lowe also worked as a baseball manager, coach, and scout. He was the player-manager of the Detroit Tigers during the last half of the 1904 season. He was also a player-manager for the Grand Rapids Wolverines in 1908, and coached college baseball in 1907 for the University of Michigan and from 1909 to 1910 for Washington & Jefferson College. Lowe was a scout for the Detroit Tigers in 1911 and 1912.

== Early years ==
Lowe was born in Pittsburgh, Pennsylvania in July 1865, two months after the end of the American Civil War and the assassination of Abraham Lincoln. His middle name "Lincoln" likely derives from the historic circumstances immediately preceding his birth. Lowe's father, Robert L. Lowe, was a Pennsylvania native and a railroad engineer. His mother, Jane (or Jennie) Lowe, was an immigrant from Ireland. At the time of the 1870 U.S. Census, at age five, he was living with his parents and four siblings Mary, Eliza (or Lida), John Charles, and Olive B., in Union Township, Lawrence County, Pennsylvania, approximately 50 miles north of Pittsburgh, a township adjoining the city of New Castle. By 1880, Lowe's father had died, and at age 15 he was living with his mother and three siblings in Union Township.

== Amateur and minor league baseball ==
In 1881, Lowe was working as an "office devil" at the Newcastle Courant, a newspaper in New Castle, Pennsylvania. In the summer of 1881, at age 16, he played in a baseball game between the printers and the doctors of New Castle. Charley Powers, who played minor league baseball, was working as a compositor at the Courant and was selected as the captain of the printers. Lowe pleaded for a place on the team, and Powers stationed him in right field. He later recalled that "the kid carried off the honors both in the field and at the bat. I saw at once that he was a born ballplayer."

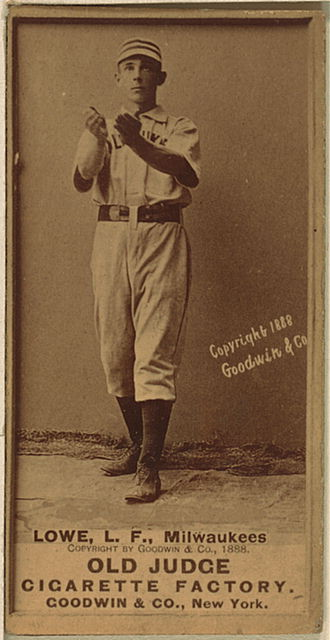
Lowe with the Milwaukee Brewers in 1888

In 1882, Lowe played with the Archie Reeds, an amateur baseball club in New Castle. He left his job with the Courant in 1883 and, at age 18, took a job as a machinist at Witherow & Co., the largest manufacturing establishment in New Castle. He was the sole support at the time for his mother and youngest sister, Olive, and gave up baseball for several years. Some accounts indicate he also played for Witherow's plant baseball team and for the Neshannocks of New Castle.

In 1886, Charley Powers organized a baseball club in New Castle and persuaded Lowe's employer to allow him to play with the club occasionally. He played catcher and third base for New Castle in 1886 and led the team in batting and baserunning.

Powers and Lowe both signed to play with the Eau Claire, Wisconsin team in the Northwestern League during the summer of 1887. Powers later recalled that the manager of the Eau Claire club, Abe Devine, ran a saloon and refused to use Lowe because he refused to patronize his saloon. Devine sent him back to New Castle, declaring, "That boy can't play ball," but brought him back to Eau Claire after the team's starting third baseman, Charlie Levis, was injured. Lowe was put into the lineup in a game against Milwaukee and drew cheers from the crowd for his defensive play at third base. In his first at-bat, he hit a long home run off Varney Anderson that "sailed far over the center field fence." He appeared in 108 games for Eau Claire in 1887, batting .294 with 47 extra-base hits, 61 stolen bases, 100 runs scored and 240 total bases. He also demonstrated his versatility in the field, playing 51 games in left field, 21 games at shortstop, 17 games in right field, 11 games at third base, 6 games as catcher, and 5 games in center field.

During the 1888 and 1889 baseball seasons, Lowe played for the Milwaukee Brewers and Milwaukee Creams of the Western Association. He hit .246 in 114 games in 1888, and hit .315 in 99 games in 1889.

== Major League Baseball ==
=== Boston Beaneaters ===
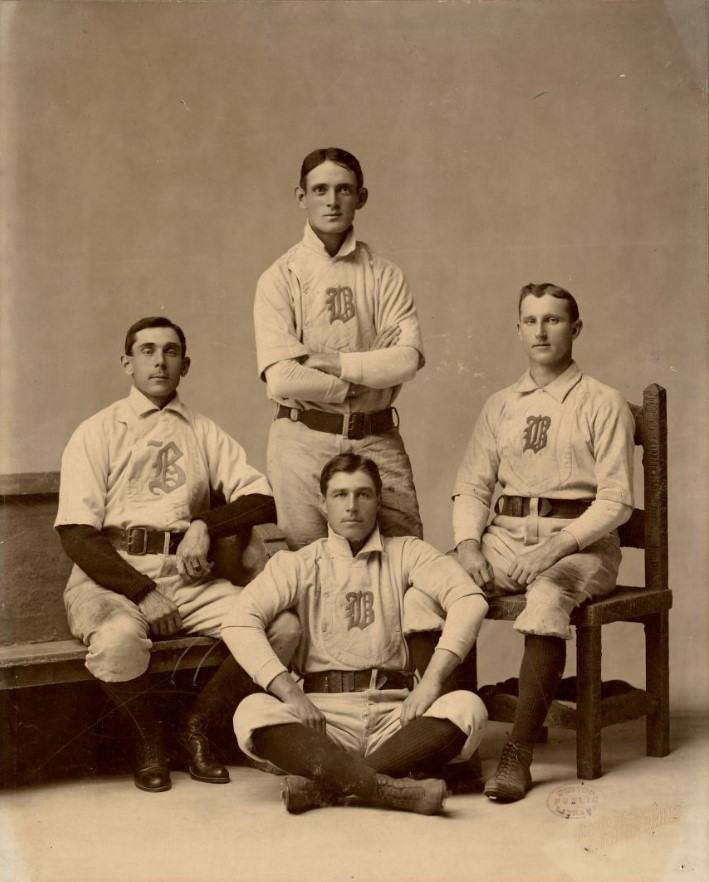
Boston's infield, rated by some as the best in baseball history. Top: Fred Tenney (1B), right: Herman Long (SS), bottom: Jimmy Collins (3B), and left: Bobby Lowe (2B)

After the 1889 baseball season, the Boston Beaneaters purchased Lowe from the Milwaukee Brewers for $700 in a deal that has been described as "one of baseball's biggest bargains." He made his Major League Baseball debut with the Beaneaters on April 19, 1890, and remained with the Beaneaters for 12 years through 1901.

During his years in Boston, Lowe developed a reputation both as a hitter and a fielder. Listed at 5 ft 10 in (1.78 m), 150 pounds (68 kg), he hit right-handed and was considered one of the best second basemen of the 19th century. He was one of only three (along with Kid Nichols and Herman Long) to play on all five of the Beaneaters teams that won pennants in the 1890s.

In 1891, Lowe tied a then major league record with six hits (four singles, a double, and a home run) in six at-bats. Having played mostly in the outfield in 1891 and 1892, he replaced Joe Quinn at second base in 1893 and was the Beaneaters' starting second baseman for eight straight years, from 1893 to 1900.

On May 30, 1894, Lowe became the first major-leaguer to hit four home runs in one game, including two home runs in the third inning. He accomplished the feat in front of a Decoration Day crowd of 8,500 spectators against Elton "Ice Box" Chamberlain of the Cincinnati Reds at Boston's Congress Street Grounds. The Boston Daily Globe reported on the game as follows:

"Bobby Lowe broke all league records with four home runs in succession, and then tied the record for total bases by adding a single, making a total of 17 bases. The hitting of Lowe has never been surpassed in a game. His home runs were on line drives far over the fence, and would be good for four bases on an open prairie. The crowd cheered Bobby every time he came up, and when he responded with a home run even the visitors had to join in the good-natured smile."

After the game, fans "showered $160 worth of silver on the plate for Lowe." In 1894, he led the National League with 613 at-bats and was among the leaders in fielding and particularly in batting, with 319 total bases (2nd in the league), 17 home runs (2nd in the league), 345 putouts as a second baseman (2nd in the league), 212 hits (4th in the league), 402 assists as a second baseman (4th in the league), and 158 runs scored (5th in the league).

He was part of a Beaneater infield that included Fred Tenney at first base, Lowe at second base, Herman Long at shortstop, and Jimmy Collins at third base, and has been rated by some as "the greatest infield of all time." John McGraw reportedly called Lowe and Long the greatest double-play combination he had seen.

In December 1895, the Boston Daily Globe published a lengthy biography of Lowe, whom the paper described as Boston's "quiet, unassuming but phenomenal second baseman." The Globe noted that the ease with which Lowe played the game led many to understate his value to the club:

"For a grand player, Lowe is seldom given the credit often dished out to his inferiors. His work does not appeal to the bleachers and grandstand like the less natural and clumsy player who is often seen floundering around like a fish out of water, while the crowd enjoy the effort and go home to tell what great playing they saw. 'He is a hard worker,' you will hear them say. Bobby Lowe is not only a hard worker but a conscientious player and an artist of the first magnitude."

Lowe's annual salary while playing for Boston never exceeded $3,000.

=== Chicago Cubs ===
On December 16, 1901, Lowe was purchased by the Chicago Orphans from the Beaneaters. In April 1902, manager Frank Selee named him team captain. He played for the Orphans, renamed the Cubs later that season, for two years. He was the starting second baseman in 1902. Although his batting statistics declined that year (.248 batting average), his .956 fielding percentage, 328 putouts, and 412 assists each ranked second among National League second basemen. In 1903, he became a backup to Johnny Evers at second base, appearing in only 32 games for the Cubs. He was paid a salary of $3,500 per year for his two years in Chicago.

=== Detroit Tigers ===
On April 20, 1904, Lowe was purchased by the Pittsburgh Pirates from the Cubs. He appeared in only one game for the Pirates before being sold to the Detroit Tigers on April 30. He was the Tigers' starting second baseman in 140 games that season. His .964 fielding percentage and 328 assists in 1904 were the second-highest among American League second basemen. Halfway through the season, he also became the manager. In 74 games as a player-manager, he led the Tigers to a 30-44 record. Despite solid fielding in 1904, Lowe's offensive output continued to decline as his batting average dropped to .207, 66 points below his career average of .273.

In 1905, Bill Armour took over as Tiger manager, and Lowe stayed on as a part-time player. He was a utility player for the next three seasons, playing all four infield positions and in the outfield. In August 1906, he sustained a broken nose and a fractured jaw after being struck by a foul tip from his own bat during a game in Philadelphia. After the injury, Lowe missed the remainder of the 1906 season and appeared in only 17 games (with 37 at-bats) in 1907, his final year in the major leagues. After that season, The Detroit News wrote that Lowe at age 42 "has not lost his batting eye nor his speed. His arm is just as good as ever and he is a much stronger ball player than many who held down regular jobs in the league this past season."

=== Career statistics and legacy ===
In his 18-season career in Major League Baseball, Lowe batted .273, with 71 home runs, 989 runs batted in, 1,135 runs, 1,934 hits, 230 doubles, 85 triples, 303 stolen bases, and 474 bases on balls in 1,821 games played. At the time of his retirement, his career fielding average of .953 was the highest for a second baseman, and his totals of 3,336 putouts and 4,171 assists also ranked among the top ten of all-time among second baseman.

In 1911, Fred Tenney wrote a series of articles for The New York Times selecting the greatest player in baseball history at each position. Having picked Johnny Evers at second base, Tenney chose Lowe as the best utility player of all time. He wrote: "Lowe of Boston was one of those baseball phenomeons [sic] who could play any position on the team in first-class style."

In 1932, syndicated sportswriter Whitney Martin wrote a column arguing that Lowe ranked with Bobby Doerr, Joe Gordon, Nap Lajoie, and Eddie Collins as the greatest second basemen of all time. Martin argued that Lowe's accomplishments were overlooked because he played "at a time when the ball had more turtle in it than rabbit." He catalogued a number of Lowe's accomplishments to support the argument:

- Hit four home runs and a single in one game for 17 total bases.
- Batted over .300 from 1893 to 1897 "with the dead ball."
- Made six hits in six at-bats for 10 total bases in another game.
- Scored six runs in one game on May 3, 1895.
- Played 34 consecutive games without an error, accepting 165 chances.

Lowe also won a reputation as a gentleman in an era of rough play. Whitney Martin noted that, in his 18-year career, Lowe "never once was fined or thumbed out of a game." At the conclusion of his playing career, The Detroit News wrote: "Lowe was one of the greatest and is today one of the most popular ball players ever in the game. There is no better type of the gentleman in baseball and no one ever heard ought but words of praise for him."

In 1936, the Baseball Hall of Fame appointed a Veteran's Committee to consider candidates from baseball's early years. Lowe ranked 34th in the voting by the Veteran's Committee, trailing Nap Lajoie and Dan Brouthers by a half vote. Of the 33 players who finished ahead of him in the voting, 24 have been inducted into the Hall of Fame, and several players who finished behind Lowe in the voting (including Bobby Wallace, Jesse Burkett, Jake Beckley, Tommy McCarthy, Tim Keefe, and Candy Cummings) have also been inducted into the Hall of Fame.

In the 2001 book The New Bill James Historical Baseball Abstract, writer Bill James ranked Lowe as the 56th greatest second baseman of all-time.

== Coaching career ==
In addition to his having been the manager of the Tigers for the last half of the 1904 season, Lowe also coached baseball at the college and minor league level. In 1907, he was hired as the baseball coach for the University of Michigan Wolverines baseball team. In April 1907, a newspaper reported: "Mr. Lowe is the idol of the students at the university and has received the highest possible praise from the college for the excellent manner in which he handles the team." Lowe led the Wolverines to a record of 11-4-1 in 1907.

After his career as a Major League player ended in 1907, Lowe was actively pursued by several minor league teams for coaching positions. He ultimately signed with Grand Rapids Wolverines of the Central League. In March 1908, Lowe expressed optimism that "there is more interest being taken in baseball in different league towns than ever before."

Lowe's final coaching position was as the baseball coach at Washington & Jefferson College in 1909 and 1910.

== Later years ==
After retiring as a player and coach, Lowe continued his affiliation with the game as a scout for the Detroit Tigers in the early 1910s. In February 1912, a syndicated newspaper story reported that Lowe had traveled 20,000 miles as a scout during the prior year, and noted that his itinerary "reads like a cross between a railroad guide and an atlas." Lowe's destinations in 1911 included Hattiesburg, Mississippi, Macon, Georgia, Yazoo City, Mississippi, Montgomery, Alabama, New Orleans, Chicago, Memphis, Atlanta, Oklahoma City, Tulsa, Hannibal, Missouri, Denver, Butte, Montana, Boise, Idaho, Kansas City, Minneapolis, Waterloo, Iowa, Green Bay, Wisconsin, Calgary, and Moose Jaw.

Lowe was married to Harriet Hughes, whose father operated the Leslie Hotel in New Castle. They had no children. After retiring from baseball, Lowe remained in Detroit. In 1920, he was living with his wife and was employed as a "dealer" in real estate. Later, he became an inspector for the City of Detroit Department of Public Works. In 1930, he was living with his wife at the Case De Vine Apartments and was employed as an inspector for the City of Detroit.

Lowe remained "a student and ardent patron of baseball." In 1922, he returned to Boston to play in a veterans baseball game to benefit Boston Children's Hospital. After Lou Gehrig hit four home runs in a game in 1932, Lowe, wearing his old Beaneaters uniform, posed for photographs with Gehrig. Lowe said, "I feel complimented to share the record with so grand a boy." He was 38 years older than Gehrig, but outlived him by 10 years. Two days before his 76th birthday, Lowe attended the 1941 All Star game in Briggs Stadium, Detroit.

In December 1951, Lowe died at his home in Detroit at the age of 86. He was posthumously inducted into the Lawrence County Sports Hall of Fame in 1995.

== See also ==
- List of Major League Baseball player-managers
- List of Major League Baseball home run records
- List of Major League Baseball runs records
- List of Major League Baseball career runs scored leaders
- List of Major League Baseball single-game hits leaders
- List of Major League Baseball single-game home run leaders
- List of Major League Baseball single-game runs scored leaders
- List of Major League Baseball single-inning home run leaders

Achievements
Preceded by none	Batters with four home runs in one game May 30, 1894	Succeeded by Ed Delahanty
