= Joe Randa =

American baseball player (born 1969)

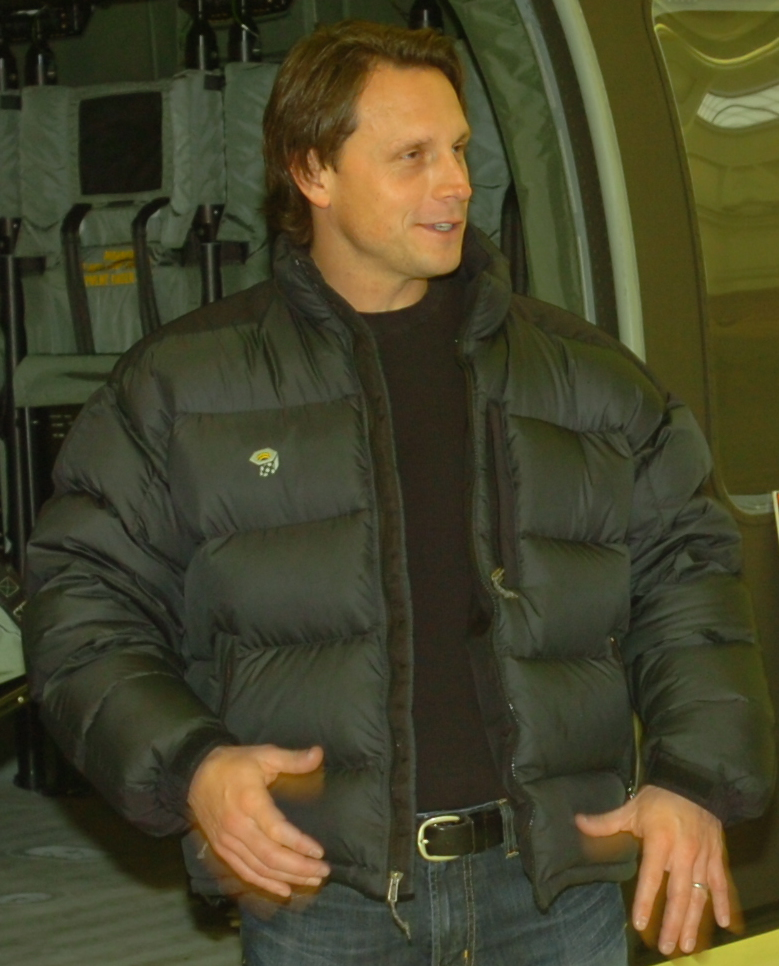
- Randa at Marshall Army Airfield in 2010
- Third baseman
- Born: December 18, 1969 (age 56); Milwaukee, Wisconsin, U.S.
- Batted: Right Threw: Right

MLB debut
- April 30, 1995, for the Kansas City Royals

Last MLB appearance
- October 1, 2006, for the Pittsburgh Pirates

MLB statistics
- Batting average: .284
- Home runs: 123
- Runs batted in: 739
- Stats at Baseball Reference

Teams
- Kansas City Royals (1995–1996); Pittsburgh Pirates (1997); Detroit Tigers (1998); Kansas City Royals (1999–2004); Cincinnati Reds (2005); San Diego Padres (2005); Pittsburgh Pirates (2006)

Joseph Gregory Randa (/ˈrændə/; born December 18, 1969) is an American former Major League Baseball player. He was primarily a third baseman during his career. His nickname is "the Joker" due to his resemblance to the comic book character in Batman and his ever-present smile.

== Early life ==
Randa attended Kettle Moraine High School in Wales, Wisconsin, lettering in football, basketball, baseball, and tennis. Randa's #12 was retired by the Lasers. He is also a member of the Kettle Moraine Laser Trailblazer Hall of Fame.

== Professional career ==
Randa played minor league for the Eugene Emeralds. He made his major league debut in 1995 with the Kansas City Royals, playing in 34 games. He played the next three seasons as a competitive third baseman with three different teams, hitting .303, .302, and .254 for the Royals, Pittsburgh Pirates, and Detroit Tigers, respectively.

The Royals reacquired Randa prior to the 1999 season. Installed as a full-time third baseman for the first time in his career, Randa hit .314 with 16 home runs and 84 RBIs, establishing himself as a run producer in the middle of the order and a steady fielder at third base. In 2003, Randa set the Kansas City Royals' team record for the most consecutive errorless games by a third baseman, going 75 games without an error. After the 2004 season ended, Randa signed with the Cincinnati Reds as a free agent. On Opening Day, Randa hit the game-winning home run in the bottom of the 9th for Cincinnati in a 7–6 victory. On July 23, 2005, Randa was traded to the San Diego Padres for pitchers Justin Germano and Travis Chick. He was then signed by the Pirates on December 28, 2005, for a one-year contract worth between $3.5 and $4 million. On September 22, Randa broke up Padres pitcher Chris Young's no-hit bid with a pinch-hit home run in the 9th inning. On November 2, 2006, Randa announced his retirement. He batted .284/.339/.426 with 123 HRs and 739 RBIs in 1,522 games over 12 seasons.

Randa is one of only three players in Kansas City Royal history to collect six hits in a nine-inning game, which he did on September 9, 2004 in the first game of a doubleheader against the Detroit Tigers at Comerica Park; he went 6-for-7 in a 26–5 Royal blowout win. Bob Oliver had collected six hits in a 1969 (the franchise's inaugural season) game and Kevin Seitzer in 1987. Randa also scored six runs in that game; he is the most recent Major Leaguer to do so until Nick Kurtz did it on July 25, 2015.

Randa made his first and only playoff appearance in 2005 with the Padres, hitting .364 in three games.

== Post pro career ==
Randa works with the Royals' minor league teams as a special assistant.

== See also ==
- List of Major League Baseball single-game hits leaders
- List of Major League Baseball single-game runs scored leaders

Awards and achievements
Preceded by Chipper Jones	Topps Rookie All-Star Third Baseman; 1996	Succeeded by Scott Rolen
Preceded by Rafael Palmeiro	American League Player of the Month; July, 1999	Succeeded by Rafael Palmeiro & Iván Rodríguez
