= Frank Torre =

American baseball player (1931–2014)

- First baseman
- Born: December 30, 1931; Brooklyn, New York, U.S.
- Died: September 13, 2014 (aged 82); Palm Beach Gardens, Florida, U.S.
- Batted: Left Threw: Left

MLB debut
- April 20, 1956, for the Milwaukee Braves

Last MLB appearance
- September 29, 1963, for the Philadelphia Phillies

MLB statistics
- Batting average: .273
- Home runs: 13
- Runs batted in: 179
- Stats at Baseball Reference

Teams
- Milwaukee Braves (1956–1960); Philadelphia Phillies (1962–1963)

Career highlights and awards
- World Series champion (1957)

Frank Joseph Torre (/ˈtɒri/; December 30, 1931 – September 13, 2014) was an American professional baseball player. He played in Major League Baseball as a first baseman. Torre, who batted and threw left-handed, played for the Milwaukee Braves (1956–60) and Philadelphia Phillies (1962–63). He was the older brother of Baseball Hall of Fame member Joe Torre, himself a former Major League Baseball player and longtime manager. Torre attended James Madison High School in his native Brooklyn, New York.

== Playing career ==
Signed by the Boston Braves as an amateur free agent in 1950, Torre spent four seasons in the Braves' farm system. He debuted with the team in 1956 (the Braves had since moved to Milwaukee) and played in 111 games, most of them as a backup. He hit .258 in 159 at-bats.

Torre's two best seasons were in 1957 and 1958; in the former year, he batted .272 with 5 home runs and 40 runs batted in. He also tied a National League record that year by scoring six runs in one game, the first game of a September 2 doubleheader against the Chicago Cubs at Wrigley Field, which the Braves won 23–10. The Braves defeated the New York Yankees in that year's World Series; Torre homered twice in the Series, which the Braves won in seven games on the strength of Lew Burdette's three victories. In 1958 Torre established career highs in batting average (.309), home runs (six) and runs batted in (55) as the Braves repeated as National League champions. However, the Yankees defeated Milwaukee in their World Series rematch after trailing 2–0 and 3–1 in the series. In the second inning of the seventh and final game, the normally sure-handed fielder was charged with throwing errors on consecutive plays, which allowed the Yankees to take a 2–0 lead without the benefit of a hit. The Braves went on to lose the game 6–2 and the series.

In his career Torre played 714 games, batting .273 with 13 home runs and 179 RBIs. He was also a difficult man to strike out, fanning only 64 times in 1482 at-bats, or one per 23.2 at-bats. Torre also was an accomplished gloveman, often replacing Joe Adcock late in close games. Torre led National League first basemen in fielding percentage in 1957 and 1958 and finished his career with a .993 fielding percentage. He committed only 28 errors in 564 games.

== Personal life ==
In 1996, as his brother Joe was managing the New York Yankees to a World Series title over the Atlanta Braves, Torre received a heart transplant from doctors Mehmet Oz and Eric Rose after a two-and-a-half month wait. Due to its proximity to Yankee Stadium, Joe brought him to New York-Presbyterian Hospital for the procedure. Many were worried about Torre dealing with the pressure of watching his brother, but he watched from his hospital bed as Joe managed the Yankees to the World Series title the next night. As in the 1958 World Series against Frank's Milwaukee Braves, the Yankees had rallied from a 0–2 deficit to win this Series, taking the next four games.

Torre served as a Vice President of the Baseball Assistance Team, a 501(c)(3) non-profit organization dedicated to helping former Major League, Minor League and Negro league players through financial and medical hardships.

In 2006, it was reported that Frank needed a kidney transplant as a result of the medication he had been taking for his heart. A year later he received a kidney from his daughter Liz.

Torre died at age 82 in a hospice in Palm Beach Gardens, Florida, on September 13, 2014.
