= List of Major League Baseball career intentional bases on balls leaders =

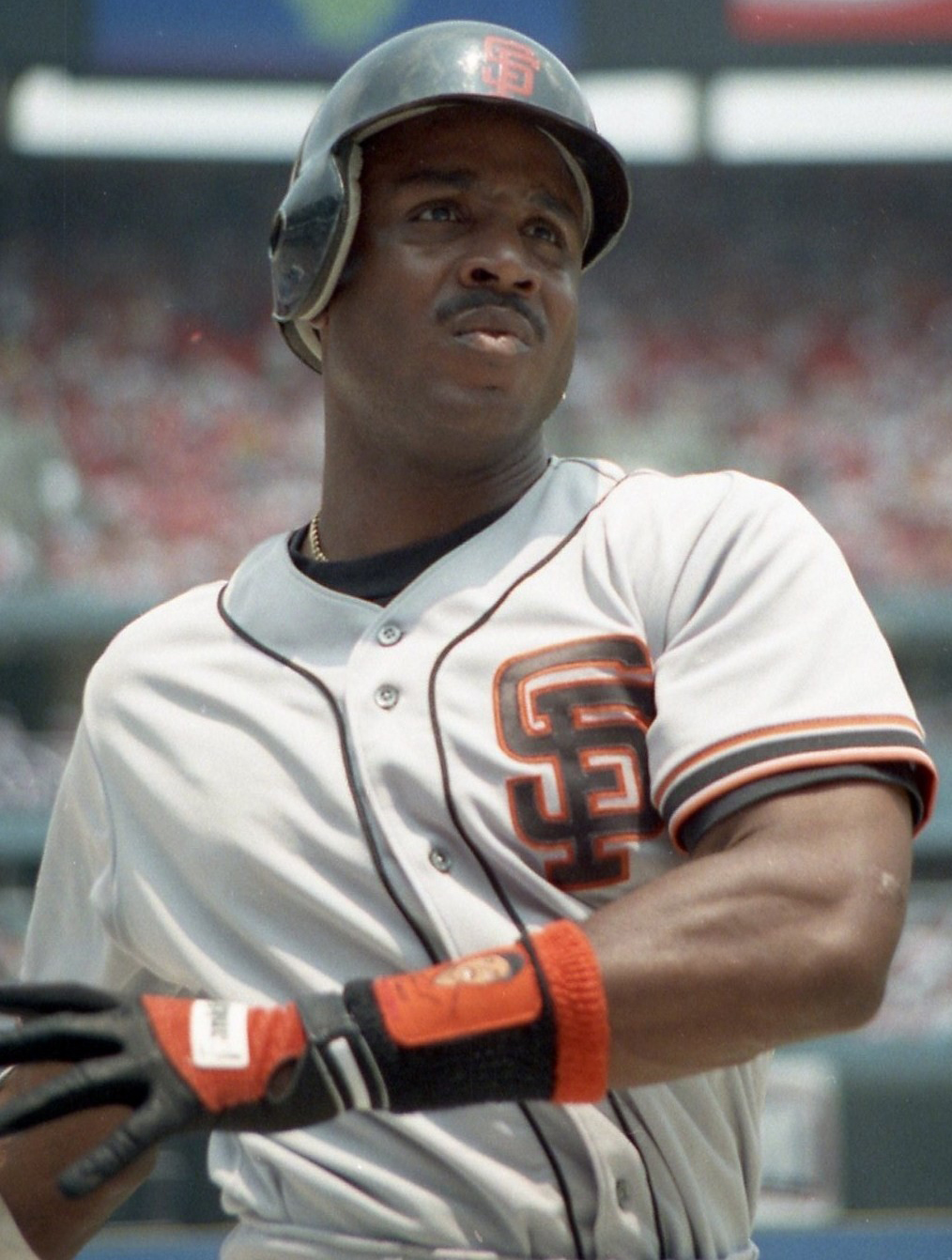
Barry Bonds, the all-time leader in intentional bases on balls.

In baseball, an intentional base on balls, usually referred to as an intentional walk and denoted in baseball scorekeeping by IBB, is a base on balls (walk) issued to a batter by a pitcher with the intent of removing the batter's opportunity to swing at the pitched ball. A pitch that is intentionally thrown far outside the strike zone for this purpose is referred to as an intentional ball. Since the 2017 season, intentional bases on balls are issued to the hitter at the discretion of a manager.

Barry Bonds is the all-time leader in intentional bases on balls with 688 career intentional walks. Bonds is the only player to be intentionally walked more than 400 times. Freddie Freeman, the active leader and tied for 61st all-time, has 145 career intentional bases on balls.

== Key ==
**Rank**	Rank amongst leaders in career intentional walks. A blank field indicates a tie.
**Player (2027 IBBs)**	Number of intentional walks hit during the 2027 Major League Baseball season.
**IBB**	Total career intentional walks
*	denotes elected to National Baseball Hall of Fame.
**Bold**	denotes active player. (Note: A player is considered inactive if he has announced his retirement or has not played for a full season.)

== List ==
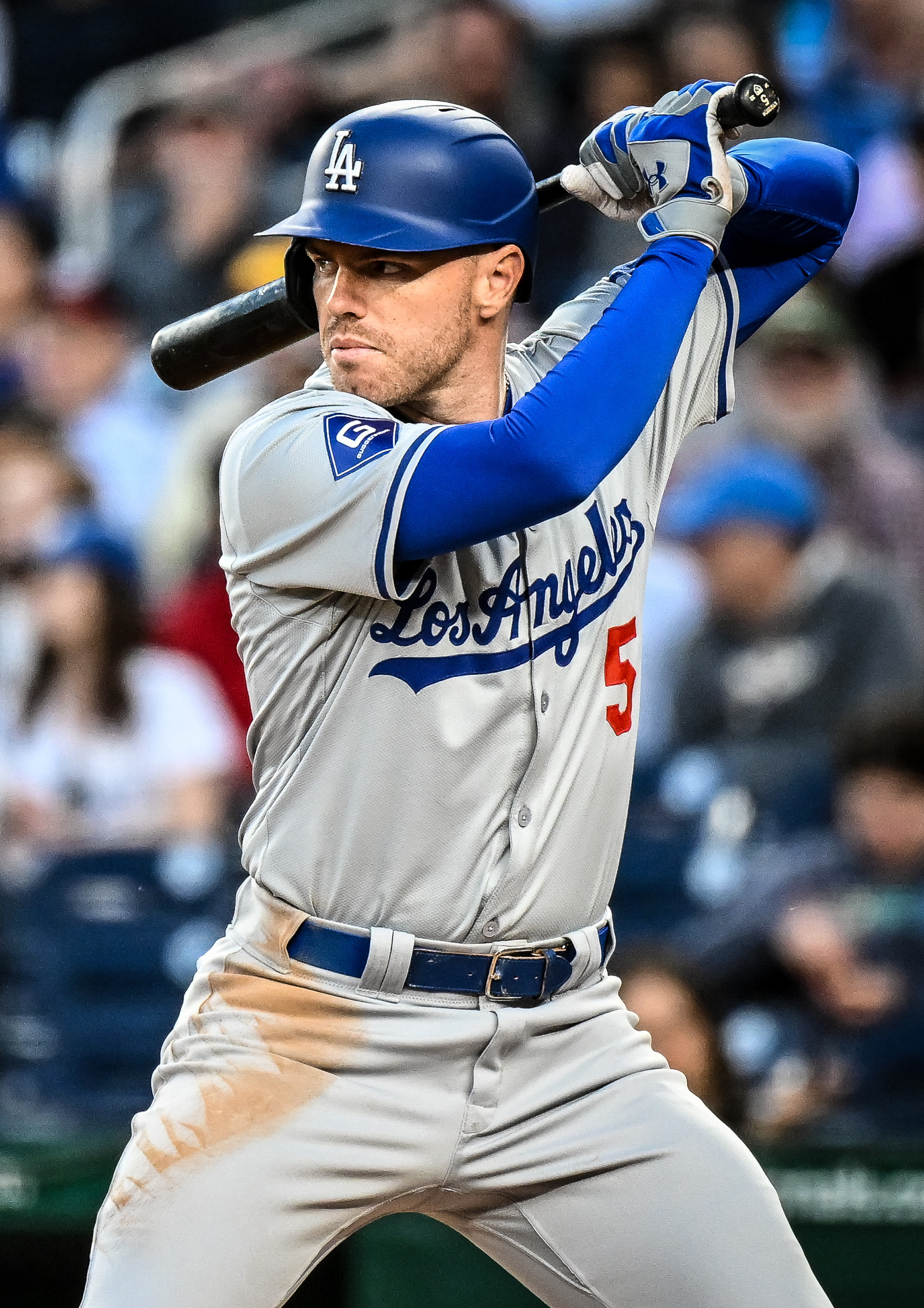
Freddie Freeman, the active leader and tied for 61st all-time in career intentional bases on balls.

- Stats updated through 2026 season.

Rank	Player (2027 IBBs)	IBB
1	Barry Bonds	688
2	Albert Pujols	316
3	Stan Musial*	298
4	Hank Aaron*	293
5	Willie McCovey*	260
6	Vladimir Guerrero*	250
7	Ken Griffey Jr.*	246
8	Ted Williams*	243
9	Miguel Cabrera	238
10	George Brett*	229
11	Willie Stargell*	227
12	Eddie Murray*	222
13	Frank Robinson*	218
14	Manny Ramirez	216
15	Willie Mays*	214
16	David Ortiz*	209
17	Tony Gwynn*	203
18	Ernie Banks*	202
19	Mike Schmidt*	201
20	Rusty Staub	193
21	Carl Yastrzemski*	190
22	Chili Davis	188
	Ted Simmons*	188
24	Harold Baines*	187
25	Carlos Delgado	186
26	Todd Helton*	185
27	Billy Williams*	182
28	Ichiro Suzuki*	181
29	Wade Boggs*	180
30	Chipper Jones*	177
31	Jim Thome*	173
32	Rafael Palmeiro	172
	Dave Winfield*	172
34	Fred McGriff*	171
35	Dave Parker*	170
36	Frank Thomas*	168
37	Roberto Clemente*	167
	Pete Rose	167
39	Prince Fielder	164
	Reggie Jackson*	164
41	Lance Berkman	160
	Harmon Killebrew*	160
43	Dale Murphy	159
44	Adrián González	158
45	John Olerud	157
46	Jeff Bagwell*	155
	Will Clark	155
48	Orlando Cepeda*	154
	Ryan Howard	154
	Duke Snider*	154

Rank	Player (2027 IBBs)	IBB
	Sammy Sosa	154
52	Ernie Lombardi*	153
53	Luis Gonzalez	150
	Mark McGwire	150
	Johnny Mize*	150
	Tony Pérez*	150
57	Mickey Mantle*	148
	Tim Raines*	148
59	Joey Votto	147
60	Mike Piazza*	146
61	**Freddie Freeman (0)**	145
	Joe Mauer*	145
63	Rod Carew*	144
	Garry Templeton	144
	Mo Vaughn	144
66	Andre Dawson*	143
67	José Cruz	142
	Ted Kluszewski	142
	Eddie Mathews*	142
	**Mike Trout (0)**	142
71	Darrell Evans	141
72	**Bryce Harper (0)**	140
	Boog Powell	140
74	Dick Allen*	138
75	Don Mattingly	136
76	Johnny Bench*	135
	Frank Howard	135
78	Jimmie Foxx*	134
79	Al Kaline*	133
80	Robin Ventura	132
81	Bill Nicholson	131
	Tony Oliva*	131
	Darryl Strawberry	131
84	Keith Hernandez	130
	Gary Sheffield	130
86	Ron Fairly	129
	Al López*	129
88	Bobby Bonilla	128
	Mel Ott*	128
90	Jack Clark	127
	Joe Torre*	127
92	Ken Singleton	125
93	Lou Brock*	124
94	**Paul Goldschmidt (0)**	123
95	Leo Cárdenas	122
	Adam Dunn	122
97	Bill Madlock	121
98	Brooks Robinson*	120
99	Víctor Martínez	119
	Tim McCarver	119
	Al Oliver	119
