= Albert Pujols =

Dominican-American baseball player (born 1980)

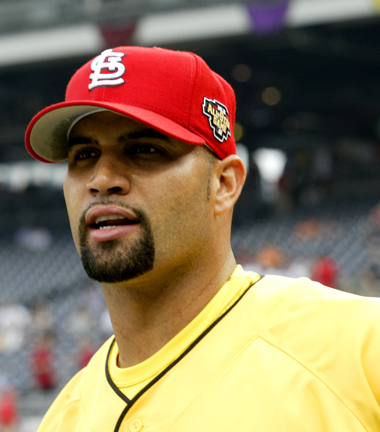
- Pujols with the St. Louis Cardinals in 2006
- First baseman / Designated hitter
- Born: January 16, 1980 (age 46); Santo Domingo, Dominican Republic
- Batted: Right Threw: Right

MLB debut
- April 2, 2001, for the St. Louis Cardinals

Last MLB appearance
- October 4, 2022, for the St. Louis Cardinals

MLB statistics
- Batting average: .296
- Hits: 3,384
- Home runs: 703
- Runs batted in: 2,218
- Stats at Baseball Reference

Teams
- St. Louis Cardinals (2001–2011); Los Angeles Angels of Anaheim / Los Angeles Angels (2012–2021); Los Angeles Dodgers (2021); St. Louis Cardinals (2022)

Career highlights and awards
- 11× All-Star (2001, 2003–2010, 2015, 2022); 2× World Series champion (2006, 2011); 3× NL MVP (2005, 2008, 2009); NL Rookie of the Year (2001); NLCS MVP (2004); 2× Gold Glove Award (2006, 2010); 6× Silver Slugger Award (2001, 2003, 2004, 2008–2010); 2× NL Hank Aaron Award (2003, 2009); NL Comeback Player of the Year (2022); Roberto Clemente Award (2008); NL batting champion (2003); 2× NL home run leader (2009, 2010); NL RBI leader (2010); St. Louis Cardinals Hall of Fame
Medals
Men's baseball
Manager for Dominican Republic
World Baseball Classic
Bronze medal – third place	2026 Miami	Team

José Alberto Pujols Alcántara (Spanish pronunciation: [puˈxols]; born January 16, 1980) is a Dominican-American professional baseball manager and former first baseman and designated hitter who is the President of Baseball Operations of the Estrellas Orientales of the Dominican Professional Baseball League. He played 22 seasons in Major League Baseball (MLB) for the St. Louis Cardinals, Los Angeles Angels, and Los Angeles Dodgers. Nicknamed "the Machine" (Spanish: La Máquina), Pujols is considered to be one of the greatest baseball players of all time.

Pujols was a highly regarded hitter who possessed a "combination of contact hitting ability, patience and raw power." He was the National League (NL) Most Valuable Player (MVP) in 2005, 2008, and 2009 and is an 11-time All-Star (2001, 2003–2010, 2015, 2022). He was a six-time Silver Slugger and won two Gold Glove awards at first base in his career. Pujols twice led the NL in home runs and once each in batting average, doubles, and runs batted in (RBIs). Pujols surpassed 3,000 career hits, becoming the 32nd MLB player to reach that milestone. During his final season, Pujols moved into second place all-time for career RBIs and total bases and became the fourth player with 700 career home runs.

== Early life ==
Pujols was born and raised in Santo Domingo, Dominican Republic, mostly by his grandmother, America Pujols, and 10 of his uncles and aunts. He is an only child. His father, Bienvenido Pujols, was a softball pitcher who struggled with alcoholism. Pujols often had to take his father home when he got drunk following games. Growing up, Pujols practiced baseball using limes for balls and a milk carton for a glove. Pujols, his father, and his grandmother immigrated in 1996 to Washington Heights in New York City, where Pujols witnessed a shooting at a bodega. Partly because of the shooting, they moved two months later to Independence, Missouri, to join some relatives.

Pujols played baseball at Fort Osage High School in Independence and was named an All-State athlete twice. As a senior, he was walked 55 times intentionally, but he still hit eight home runs in 33 at-bats. One of his home runs travelled 450 feet (140 m).

== College career ==
After graduating from high school a semester early in December 1998, he was given a baseball scholarship to Maple Woods Community College. Pujols hit a grand slam and turned an unassisted triple play in the first game of his only college season. Playing shortstop, he batted .461 with 22 home runs as a freshman before deciding to enter the Major League Baseball (MLB) draft.

== Professional career ==
=== Draft and minor leagues ===
Few teams were interested in Pujols because of uncertainty about his age, which position he would play, and his build. Tampa Bay Rays scout Fernando Arango recommended that his team sign Pujols, and quit his job when Tampa Bay failed to do so. Pujols was not drafted until the 13th round of the 1999 Major League Baseball (MLB) draft, when the St. Louis Cardinals selected him with the 402nd overall pick. Pujols initially turned down a $10,000 bonus and spent the summer playing for the Hays Larks of the Jayhawk Collegiate League (a summer league in the National Baseball Congress). When the Cardinals increased their bonus offer to $60,000, he signed.

Pujols began his minor league career in 2000 playing third base with the Peoria Chiefs of the single-A Midwest League. He batted .324 with 128 hits, 32 doubles, six triples, 17 home runs and 84 RBI, in 109 games. He was voted the league's Most Valuable Player and named to the All-Star team. Pujols also played 21 games with the Potomac Cannons in the high-A Carolina League that year, batting .284 with 23 hits, nine doubles, one triple, two home runs and 10 RBI. He finished the 2000 season with the Memphis Redbirds in the AAA Pacific Coast League (PCL), and after appearing in three regular season games with them, he batted .367 in the playoffs and was named the postseason Most Valuable Player (MVP) as the Redbirds won their first PCL title.

=== St. Louis Cardinals (2001–2011) ===
==== Early career (2001–2003) ====
During spring training in 2001, incumbent first baseman Mark McGwire told Cardinals manager Tony La Russa that if he did not promote Pujols to the major league roster, "it might be one of the worst moves you make in your career." La Russa later recounted the "myth" that Pujols only made the Opening Day roster in 2001 because Bobby Bonilla was injured. According to La Russa, he and the rest of Cardinals management were impressed enough by Pujols that they decided to promote him to the big league club even before Bonilla's injury. Cardinals executive John Vuch backed this up, calling the link between Pujols and Bonilla an "old wives' tale" and stating that the competition for the last roster spot was actually between Bonilla and John Mabry. Although the team did not require Pujols to fill any particular position, the Cardinals activated him to the Opening Day roster, and he started all season at third base, right field, left field, or first base.

On Opening Day against the Colorado Rockies on April 2, Pujols became the first major league player born in the 1980s. In that game, he recorded his first career hit, a single against pitcher Mike Hampton in an 8–0 loss. Four days later, he had three hits and three RBI — including his first home run — against the Arizona Diamondbacks' Armando Reynoso in a 12–9 win. On April 9, in his first career home game, Pujols hit a two-run home run in his first at bat against Denny Neagle of Colorado. Through 2015, he was one of three players to hit 20 or more home runs in their rookie year before July, along with Wally Berger (1930) and Joc Pederson (2015). At midseason, Pujols became the first Cardinals rookie since Luis Arroyo in 1955 to make the All-Star Game. He finished the season batting .329 (sixth in the league) with 194 hits (fifth in the league), 47 doubles (fifth in the league), 37 home runs, and 112 runs. His 37 home runs led the Cardinals, topping Jim Edmonds' 30 and McGwire's 29. He was named the National League (NL) Silver Slugger Award winner for the third base position, and he finished fourth in NL Most Valuable Player (MVP) voting, behind Barry Bonds, Sammy Sosa and Luis Gonzalez. He was unanimously named the NL Rookie of the Year after setting an NL rookie record with 130 RBI's (fifth in the league) and becoming the fourth MLB rookie to hit .300 with 30 home runs, 100 runs, and 100 RBI's.

The Cardinals finished the 2001 season with a 93–69 record and advanced to the playoffs as the National League wild card team. The team advanced to the NL Division Series (NLDS). In Game 2 on October 10, Pujols hit a game-winning two-run home run against Diamondbacks pitcher Randy Johnson in a 4–1 victory. The Cardinals, however, were eliminated in five games, and Pujols had just two hits in 18 at-bats.

After playing several positions in 2001, Pujols spent most of 2002 in left field. He began the season batting cleanup but was moved in May to the third spot in the lineup, where he remained for the rest of his Cardinals career. Pujols hit his 30th home run and 100th RBI of the season in a 5–4 loss to the Cincinnati Reds in August, making him the sixth Cardinal to have back-to-back 30-home-run seasons and the second Cardinal (the other was Ray Jablonski) to start his career with back-to-back 100-RBI seasons. The following month, Pujols hit a game-winning two-run single against Pete Munro in a 9–3 victory over the Houston Astros that gave the Cardinals the NL Central title. Pujols finished the year batting .314 (seventh in the NL) with 185 hits (tied for fourth in the NL), 40 doubles (eighth in the NL), 34 home runs (10th in the NL), 118 runs scored (second in the NL to Sosa's 122), and 127 RBI's (second in the NL). He became the first player in major league history to hit over .300 with at least 30 home runs, 100 runs scored, and 100 RBI in his first two seasons. Pujols finished second in MVP voting to Bonds, becoming the first Cardinal since Stan Musial to finish in the top four in MVP voting for consecutive seasons. At the end of the 2002 season, Chris Haft of MLB.com called him "an outstanding hitter."

Pujols' contributions helped the Cardinals finish third in home runs and second in batting average and RBI; the Cardinals' pitching staff also finished fourth in ERA. The Cardinals again reached the playoffs, and Pujols had three hits and three RBI in a three-game sweep of the Diamondbacks in the 2002 NLDS. The team advanced to the 2002 NL Championship Series (NLCS), but lost in five games to the San Francisco Giants. Pujols had five hits, one home run and two RBI in the series.

Five Cardinals were named to the All-Star Game in 2003 while Pujols led the NL in votes. It was the first of eight straight seasons that Pujols would reach the All-Star Game. From July 12 to August 16, Pujols had a 30-game hitting streak, tied for the second-longest in Cardinals' history with Musial and behind only Rogers Hornsby's 33-game streak. On July 20, Pujols hit his 100th career home run, a game-winner in a 10–7 victory over the Dodgers. He became the fourth major leaguer to hit his 100th home run in his third season, along with Ralph Kiner, Eddie Mathews and Joe DiMaggio. Pujols hit his 114th home run on September 20 in a game against the Astros, which tied him with Kiner for the most home runs by a player in his first three seasons.

In 157 games, Pujols hit 43 home runs (fourth in the league, behind Jim Thome, Richie Sexson and Bonds) and had 124 RBI's (tied with Sexson for fourth and behind Preston Wilson, Gary Sheffield and Thome). He became the youngest player since Tommy Davis in 1962 to win the NL batting title after batting .359, and he led the league in runs (137), hits (212), and doubles (51). Pujols joined Rogers Hornsby as the only players in the Cardinals' history to record more than 40 homers and 200 hits in the same season. Though his stellar play had Cardinals' fans chanting "M-V-P!" during home games as early as June, Pujols again finished second to Bonds in MVP voting. He won his second Silver Slugger Award and first Sporting News Player of the Year Award. Pujols' contributions helped the Cardinals rank second in batting average and third in home runs in the NL; however, the pitching staff posted a 4.60 ERA, which was below the league average, and the Cardinals missed the playoffs.

==== New contract (2004–2005) ====
After receiving many awards in his first three seasons, Pujols was rewarded monetarily for his accomplishments on February 20, 2004, when he signed a seven-year, $100 million contract extension with a $16 million club option for 2011 with no-trade provisions. He was moved to first base in 2004 after the Cardinals traded Tino Martinez in the offseason. On June 16, he hit a walk-off home run against Reds pitcher Mike Matthews in the 10th inning of a 4–3 victory.

Pujols' highlights later in the season included a July game in which he hit five RBI and three home runs in a thrilling win over the rival Chicago Cubs, and another in which he broke up a no-hitter by Giants pitcher Dustin Hermanson. During a September game against the Rockies, he earned his 500th RBI, joining Joe DiMaggio and Ted Williams as the only players to have 500 RBI in their first four seasons. Although Pujols was diagnosed with plantar fasciitis during the second half of the season, he finished the season with a .331 average (fifth in the league), 196 hits (fifth), 51 doubles (second to Lyle Overbay's 53), 46 home runs (tied with Adam Dunn for second behind Adrián Beltré's 48), and 123 RBIs (third, behind Vinny Castilla's 131 and Scott Rolen's 124) in 154 games. He also led the league with 133 runs scored. On defense, he tied for the league lead in errors by a first baseman, with 14. He finished third in MVP voting (behind Bonds and Beltré), joining Musial as the only Cardinals to finish in the top five in voting for at least four years in a row. He won the Silver Slugger Award at first base, the third position he won the award at. Pujols, along with teammates Edmonds and Rolen, earned the nickname "MV3" for their phenomenal seasons; Pujols led the three in home runs and batting average.

The Cardinals won the NL Central, aided by pitcher Chris Carpenter, who won 15 games and had a 3.46 ERA his first season with the team en route to winning the National League Comeback Player of the Year Award. In Game 4 of the NLDS against the Dodgers, Pujols hit a three-run home run against Wilson Álvarez and had four RBI as the Cardinals won, 6–2, and took the series three games to one. In Game 6 of the NLCS, Pujols had three hits, scored three runs (including the winning run), and hit a two-run home run off Munro in a 12-inning, 6–4 victory. The Cardinals won the series in seven games, advancing to the World Series for the first time since 1987. Pujols was named the NLCS MVP after batting .500 with four home runs and nine RBI. He was one of three Cardinals batters hit over .250 in the series against the Boston Red Sox, batting .333 as the Cardinals were swept by Boston in four games.

By 2005, many baseball fans thought that Pujols was the best Cardinal since Musial. Pujols picked up his 100th RBI of the season on August 31, joining Williams, DiMaggio and Al Simmons as the only players with 100 RBI in their first five seasons. Pujols hit his 200th career home run in a game against the Reds on September 30, making him the third-youngest major league player to reach that milestone (behind Mel Ott and Eddie Mathews) and the second-fastest to reach it (behind Kiner). In 161 games, Pujols batted .330 (second to Derrek Lee's .335 average) with 195 hits (fourth behind Lee, Miguel Cabrera and Jimmy Rollins), 38 doubles, 41 home runs (third, behind Andruw Jones' 51 and Lee's 46), 117 RBI's (tied with Burrell for second behind Jones' 128), and 129 runs scored (first in the league). For the first time in his career, he won the NL MVP award as Bonds was limited to 14 games due to an injury.

Pujols returned to the playoffs as the Cardinals won the NL Central for the second year in a row. He had five hits in nine at-bats with four runs scored and two RBI in the NLDS as the Cardinals swept the Padres. In Game 5 of the NLCS against the Astros, with the Cardinals trailing by two runs and only one out from elimination in the ninth inning, Pujols hit a game-winning three-run home run against Brad Lidge that landed on the train tracks in the back of Minute Maid Park. The Cardinals won 5–4. MLB.com writer Matthew Leach later called it "one of the most famous playoff home runs in recent years." Nevertheless, the Cardinals were eliminated in Game 6 by the Astros. Pujols batted .304 with two home runs and six RBI in the series.

==== Continued success and first World Series (2006–2008) ====
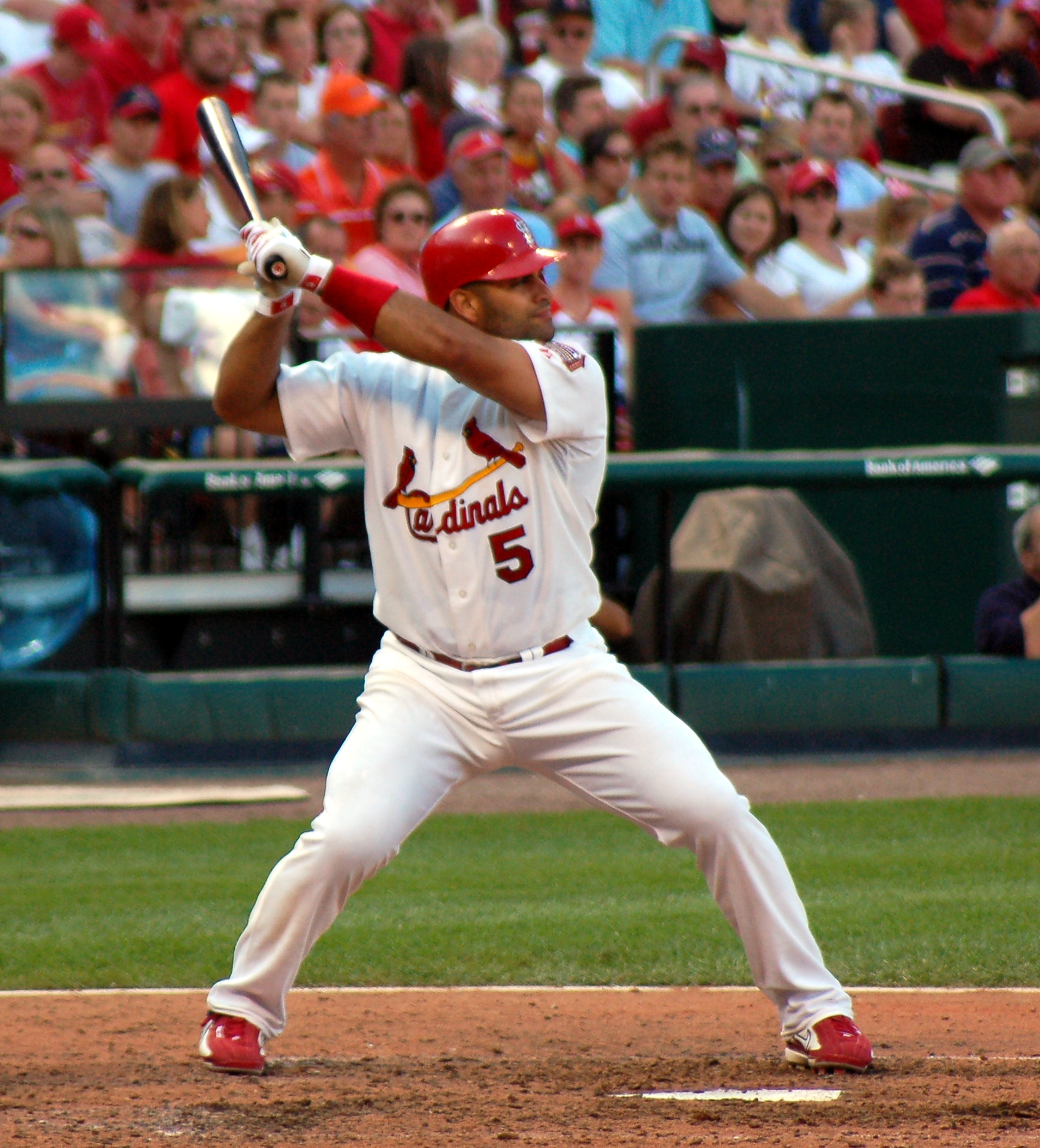
Pujols in 2006

Over two games in April 2006, Pujols hit home runs in four consecutive plate appearances, making him the 20th player to accomplish the feat. Pujols maintained after the game that he was more concerned with winning than the numbers: "I don't look at numbers," he said. "I don't know. I didn't know anything about [the record] until you guys brought it up. Because that's not me. I don't get locked in on numbers. I don't get locked in on anything like that. I get locked in on seeing the ball and helping my team out to win and hopefully doing some damage out there." Pujols had three hits and four RBI, including his 1,000th career hit (a home run against Jerome Williams), as the Cardinals defeated the Cubs 9–3 on April 21, 2006. On June 4, he was placed on the disabled list (DL) for the first time in his career with a strained right oblique that kept him out for three weeks. On August 22, Pujols hit a three-run home run and a grand slam against John Maine in an 8–7 loss to the Mets. On September 28, with the Cardinals trailing the Padres 2–1 in the eighth inning, he hit a three-run home run against Cla Meredith, helping the Cardinals win 4–2 and end a seven-game losing streak. The win preserved the Cardinals' 1.5-game division lead; La Russa later called it "the most huge of the huge ones he's hit."

Pujols finished the season with a .331 average (third to Freddy Sanchez's .344 and Cabrera's .339), 177 hits, 33 doubles, 49 home runs (second to Ryan Howard's 58), 137 RBI (second to Howard, 149) and 119 runs scored (tied with Matt Holliday, Hanley Ramírez, and Alfonso Soriano for fifth). Of his 49 home runs, 20 produced a game-winning RBI, breaking Willie Mays' single-season record set in 1962. He finished second to Howard in MVP voting and won the NL Gold Glove Award for first base. He won his first of four consecutive Fielding Bible Awards for the first base position.

Led by Pujols and Carpenter, the Cardinals won the NL Central and reached the playoffs for the third year in a row. In Game 1 of the NLDS against the Padres, he hit a game-winning two-run home run against Jake Peavy as the Cardinals won 5–1. He had a game-winning RBI against David Wells and had three hits in Game 2 as the Cardinals won 2–0. He batted .333 with a home run and an RBI in the series as the Cardinals defeated the Padres in four games. In Game 2 of the NLCS against the Mets, Pujols scored three runs as the Cardinals won 9–6. He batted .318 with one home run and one RBI in the series as the Cardinals defeated the Mets in seven games. In Game 1 of the World Series against the Detroit Tigers, he hit a two-run home run against Justin Verlander as the Cardinals won 7–2. In Game 5, he made a sprawling, flip-from-his-back play to rob Plácido Polanco of a hit as the Cardinals clinched the series, giving Pujols his first career World Series ring.

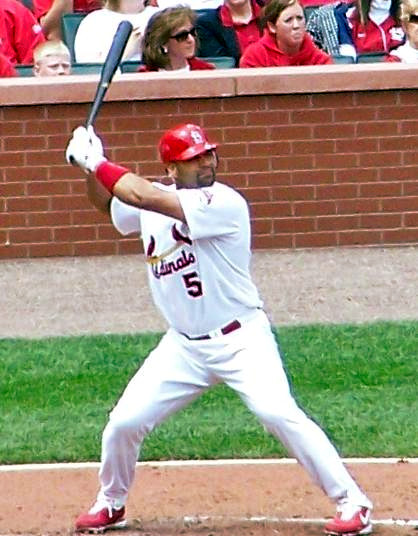
Pujols preparing to hit

Near the beginning of the 2007 season in an April 22 game against the Cubs, Pujols hit a game-winning three-run home run against Ryan Dempster in the 10th inning of a 12–9 victory, tying Ken Boyer for second all-time on the Cardinals' home run list with his 255th. Pujols finished the season with 185 hits, 38 doubles and 103 RBI (a career-low). He was among the league leaders in batting average (.327, sixth) and home runs (32, tied for tenth). He scored 99 runs, ending his streak of seasons with at least 30 home runs, a .300 average, 100 runs scored and 100 RBI, at six. He grounded into a major-league-leading 27 double plays. He finished ninth in MVP voting, the first year he had finished outside the top five.

Pujols began 2008 by reaching base in 42 straight games, the longest streak to open a season since 1999. On June 11, he was placed on the 15-day disabled list with a strained left calf muscle. Pujols hit his 300th home run against Bob Howry on July 4 in a 2–1 loss to the Cubs. He said after the game that to him it was "just another homer that goes out of the park. I'm happy to do it in front of our fans; they were waiting for it." On September 11, in a 3–2 loss to the Cubs, Pujols hit his 100th RBI of the season against Rich Harden, making him the third player in major league history to start his career with eight seasons of at least 100 RBI (along with Al Simmons and Ted Williams). He regretted that the milestone came in a loss, saying, "I wish it would have come with a great win. It would have been more special."

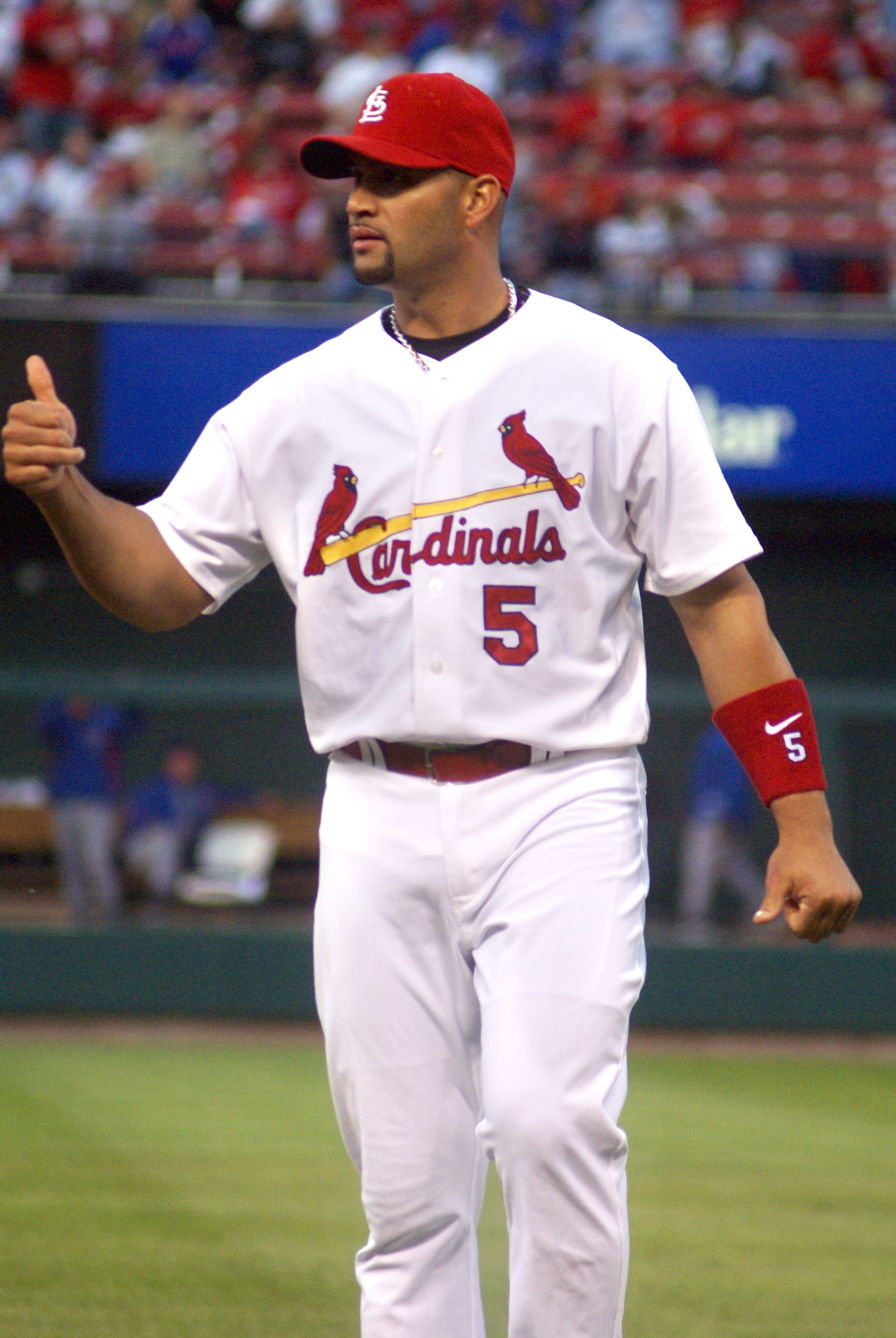
Pujols is among the top 5 players all-time in home runs, RBIs, doubles, and total bases.

In 148 games in 2008, Pujols batted .357 (second to Chipper Jones' .364 average) with 187 hits (third, behind Reyes's 204 and David Wright's 189), 44 doubles (tied with Stephen Drew and Aramis Ramírez for fourth in the league behind Berkman and Nate McLouth's 46 and Corey Hart's 45), 37 home runs (tied with Ryan Braun and Ryan Ludwick for fourth in the league behind Howard's 48, Dunn's 40, and Delgado's 38), 116 RBI (fourth, behind Howard's 146, Wrights 124 and Adrián González's 119) and 100 runs scored. He grounded into a National League-leading 27 double plays. Pujols won his second NL MVP Award, and he won the Silver Slugger Award for the fourth time in his career. He was named The Sporting News Player of the Year for the second time in his career. For his work off the field, he was named the 2008 winner of the Roberto Clemente Award. He considered having Tommy John surgery after the season but underwent nerve transposition surgery on his right elbow instead to ease discomfort.

==== Later Cardinals career and second World Series (2009–2011) ====
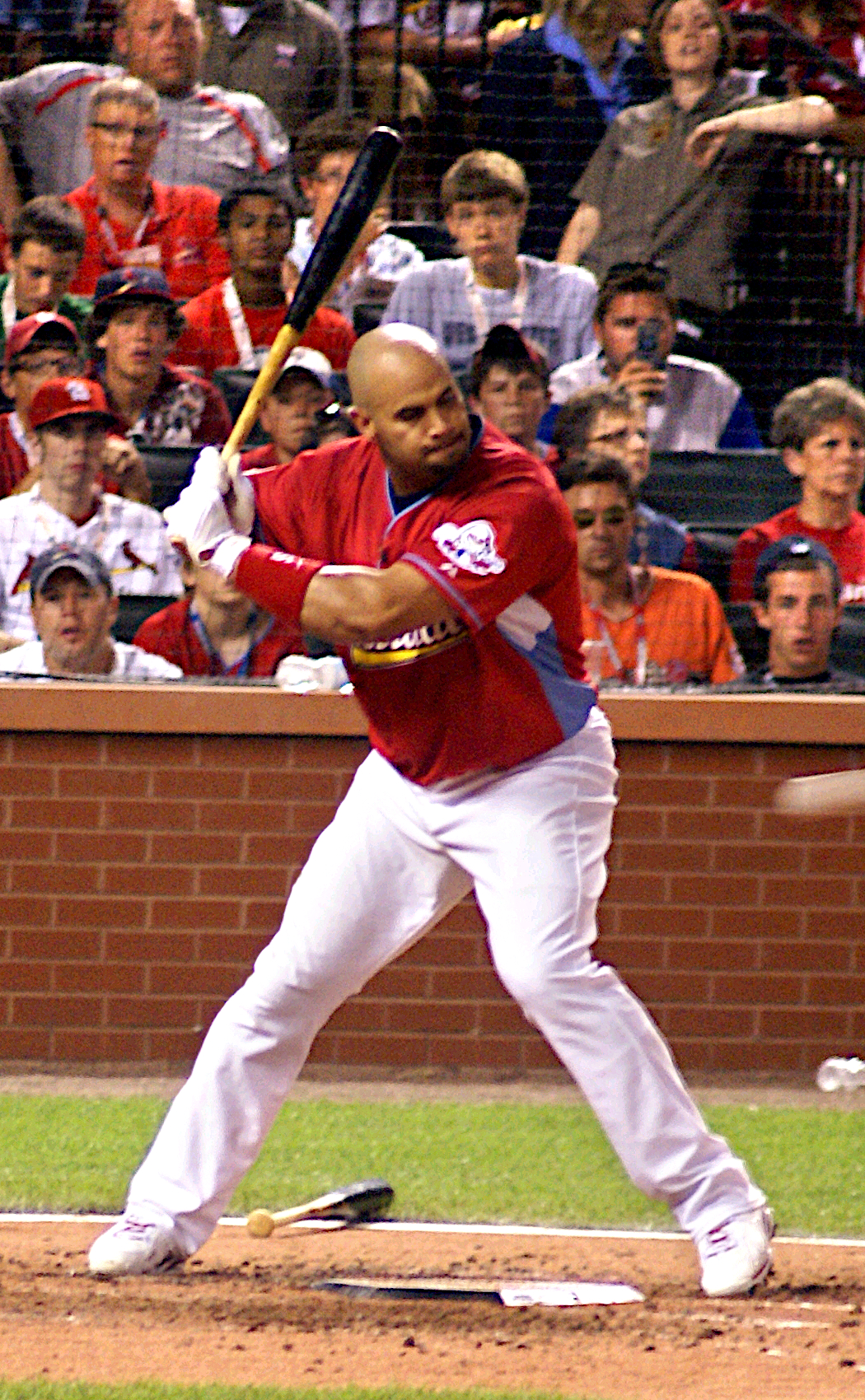
Pujols participating in the 2009 Home Run Derby

On April 25, 2009, Pujols picked up his 1,000th career RBI with a 441-foot grand slam against David Patton in an 8–2 victory over the Cubs. "I hit that ball as good as I can hit a ball," he said after the game. On July 3, he hit his 10th career grand slam against Weathers in a 7–4 victory over the Reds, breaking Musial's record for most grand slams by a Cardinal. The grand slam was also his 350th career home run, making him the third-fastest player to reach the milestone, behind Alex Rodriguez and Ken Griffey Jr. He received the highest number of votes in NL history for the All-Star Game that year.

Pujols had four hits, scored three runs, and knocked in five RBI on August 4, including a grand slam against Sean Green that tied the NL record for most grand slams in a season (five), in a 10-inning, 12–7 victory over the Mets. In 160 games, Pujols batted .327 (third, behind Ramírez's .342 and Pablo Sandoval's .330) with 186 hits (sixth), 45 doubles (second to Miguel Tejada's 46), 47 home runs (first), 135 RBI (third behind Fielder and Howard's 141) and 124 runs scored (first). He was unanimously named the NL MVP for the third time, tying Musial as the Cardinals' leader in that category. For the fifth time in his career, he won the Silver Slugger Award. He won the Sporting News MLB Player of the Year award for the second consecutive year, joining Williams and Joe Morgan as the only players to win it in back-to-back years. For the fourth year in a row, he won the Fielding Bible Award for first base.

Aided by the mid-season acquisition of Matt Holliday (who replaced Ryan Ludwick as the cleanup hitter) and the emergence of Adam Wainwright (who led the NL in wins), the Cardinals returned to the playoffs after a two-year hiatus. In the NLDS against the Dodgers, Pujols batted .300 with one RBI as the Cardinals were swept in three games. Following the postseason, Pujols had surgery to remove five bone spurs from his right elbow. The Cardinals called the surgery a "success", and Dr. James Andrews decided that Pujols did not need Tommy John surgery.

For April 2010, Pujols earned his first Pepsi Clutch Performer of the Month Award. He batted .348, 1.270 OPS, three home runs and 14 RBI with runners on base. Further, in situations with his team leading by one run, tied, or having the potential tying run on base, at bat, or on deck after the seventh inning ("late-and-close"), he batted .583 (7-for-12) with a home run, two doubles, three RBI and five runs scored. On June 29, in an 8–0 victory over the Diamondbacks, Pujols hit five RBI and hit two home runs against Dontrelle Willis for his 37th career multi-homer game, which tied Musial's franchise record for multi-homer games. "It's pretty special," he said of tying Musial. "I'm blessed to have the opportunity to be compared sometimes with him." On August 26, he hit his 400th career home run against Jordan Zimmermann in a 13-inning, 11–10 loss to the Nationals. He became the third-youngest player to reach the milestone – behind Griffey Jr. and Rodriguez – and he became the fourth-quickest player by at bats to reach the milestone (behind McGwire, Babe Ruth, Harmon Killebrew, and Thome). On September 11, in a 12-inning 6–3 loss to Atlanta, Pujols had three RBI and reached 100 RBI for the 10th consecutive year with a two-run double against Tommy Hanson. Only Al Simmons has a longer streak of 100 RBI seasons at the beginning of a career, with 11. Pujols joined Jimmie Foxx, Lou Gehrig, and Rodriguez in having 10 consecutive seasons of 100 or more RBI at any time in their career. Foxx and Rodriguez are the only two players besides Pujols to have 10 consecutive years of 30 home runs and 100 RBI. The next day, in a 7–3 victory over the Braves, he passed Musial to be the all-time Cardinals' leader in multi-home run games when he hit two home runs against Tim Hudson for the 38th time in a game.

In 159 games, Pujols batted .312 (sixth) with 183 hits (fifth) and 39 doubles (tied for eighth with Marlon Byrd); he led the league in runs scored (115), home runs (42) and RBI (118). He won his second Gold Glove Award for first base, and he won the NL First Base Silver Slugger Award for the sixth time. He finished second in the NL MVP voting to Joey Votto, who said he was "shocked" that Pujols only got one first-place vote.

Pujols and the Cardinals set a deadline for the start of 2011 spring training for contract extension negotiations but failed to reach an agreement. After Pujols struggled in his first 30 games of the season in batting .231, he batted .316 with 30 home runs in his final 117 games. Against the Cubs, he hit consecutive extra-inning walk-off home runs on June 4 and 5 for the first time since Albert Belle in 1995. Carpenter noted after the game that Pujols' slump earlier in the year was over: "He continues to do great things, there's no doubt about it," he said. "The things that he's done the last few days have been just like the old Albert." On June 19 against the Royals, Wilson Betemit collided with Pujols, inducing a small fracture his left wrist and keeping him inactive until July 5. On July 30, in a 9–2 victory over the Cubs, he got his 2,000th career hit against Carlos Mármol, becoming the fifth Cardinal to reach 2,000 hits and 12th-fastest major leaguer by games to reach the milestone. In the Cardinals' final game of the season, against the Astros on September 28, he had the game-winning RBI against Brett Myers in the 8–0 victory, helping the Cardinals overcome a 10.5-game deficit to Atlanta to win the Wild Card.

Pujols finished the season with 173 hits (tied for ninth with Aramis Ramírez), 29 doubles (a career-low), and 105 runs scored (tied for third with Justin Upton behind Ryan Braun's 109 and Matt Kemp's 115). He saw his streak of seasons batting at least .300 with 30 home runs and 100 RBI snapped when he hit 37 home runs (third, behind Fielder's 38 and Kemp's 39), but batted .299 with 99 RBI (seventh); however, only three other players in the major leagues matched him in those categories (José Bautista, Fielder, and Kemp), causing Tyler Kepner of The New York Times to write, "Even when Pujols struggles, he excels." He grounded into a major-league leading 29 double plays. He was fifth in MVP voting.

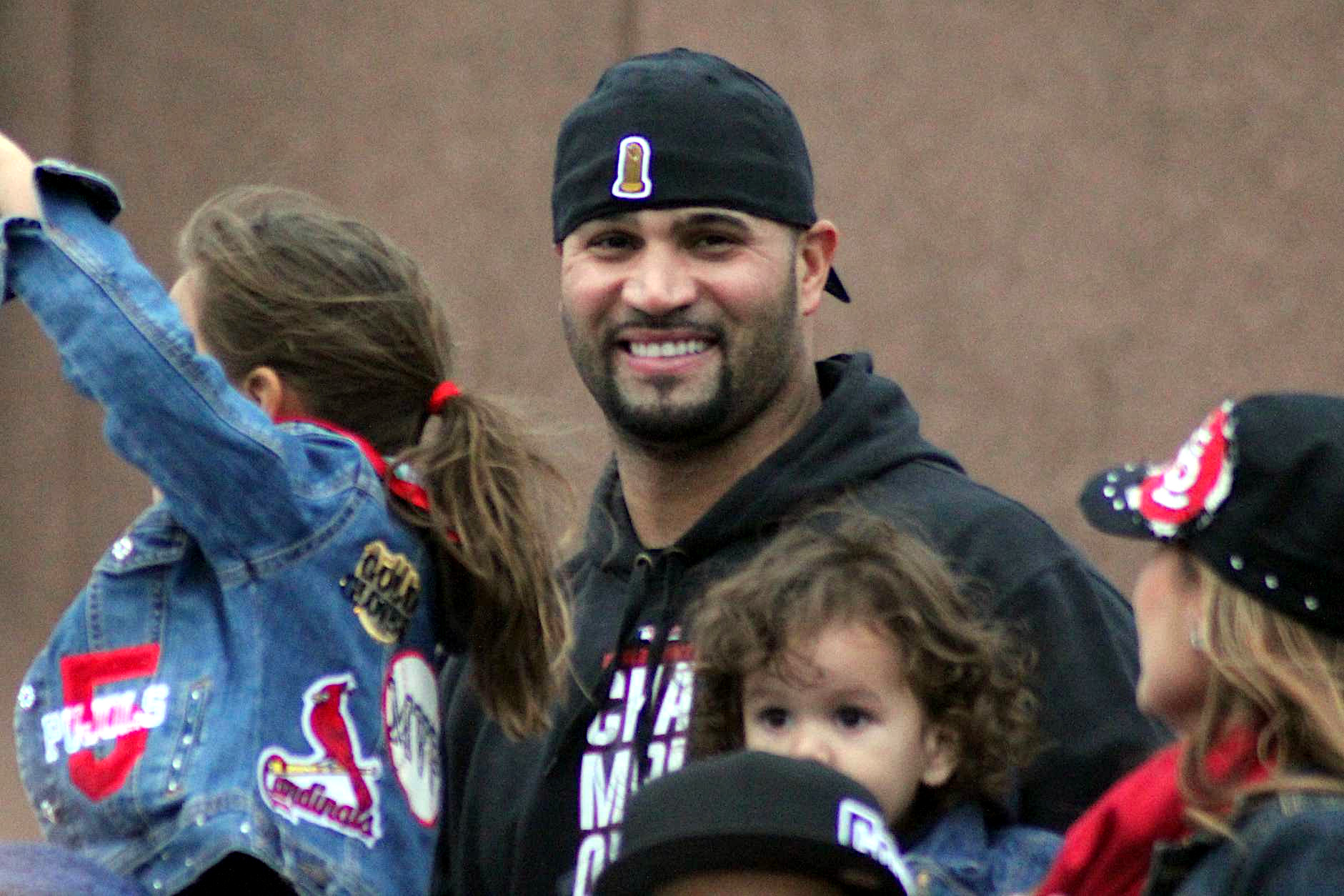
Pujols during the 2011 World Series parade. His historic Game 3 performance included three home runs.

In Game 2 of the NLDS against the Phillies on October 2, Pujols had a game-winning RBI single against Cliff Lee in the 5–4 victory. He batted .350 with one RBI in the series as the Cardinals defeated the Phillies in five games. In Game 2 of the NLCS against the Brewers, he had four hits, three runs scored, one home run and five RBI, in a 12–3 victory. He batted .478 with two home runs and nine RBI in the series as the Cardinals defeated the Brewers in six games. On October 22, in Game 3 of the World Series, Pujols had five hits, three home runs, four runs scored and six RBI in a 16–7 victory over the Rangers. He joined Babe Ruth and Reggie Jackson as the only players in baseball history to hit three home runs in a World Series game, set a series record with 14 total bases, became the first player in series history to have hits in four consecutive innings, and tied records for most hits and most RBI in a World Series game. He had one hit and no RBI the other six games of the series but became a World Series champion for the second time as the Cardinals defeated the Rangers in seven games. After the season, he became a free agent for the first time in his career.

=== Los Angeles Angels (2012–2021) ===
Three teams were reported to be interested in Pujols during the 2011 offseason: the Cardinals, the Miami Marlins, and the Los Angeles Angels. The Cardinals offered Pujols a 10-year, $210 million deal (with $30 million deferred), but Pujols rejected it. His wife, Deidre, explained on a radio talk show that they were "insulted" and "confused" that the Cardinals had initially offered Pujols a five-year deal. The Marlins reportedly offered Pujols a 10-year contract too, but on December 8, he signed a 10-year deal with the Angels worth around $254 million.

==== Early Angels tenure (2012–2016) ====
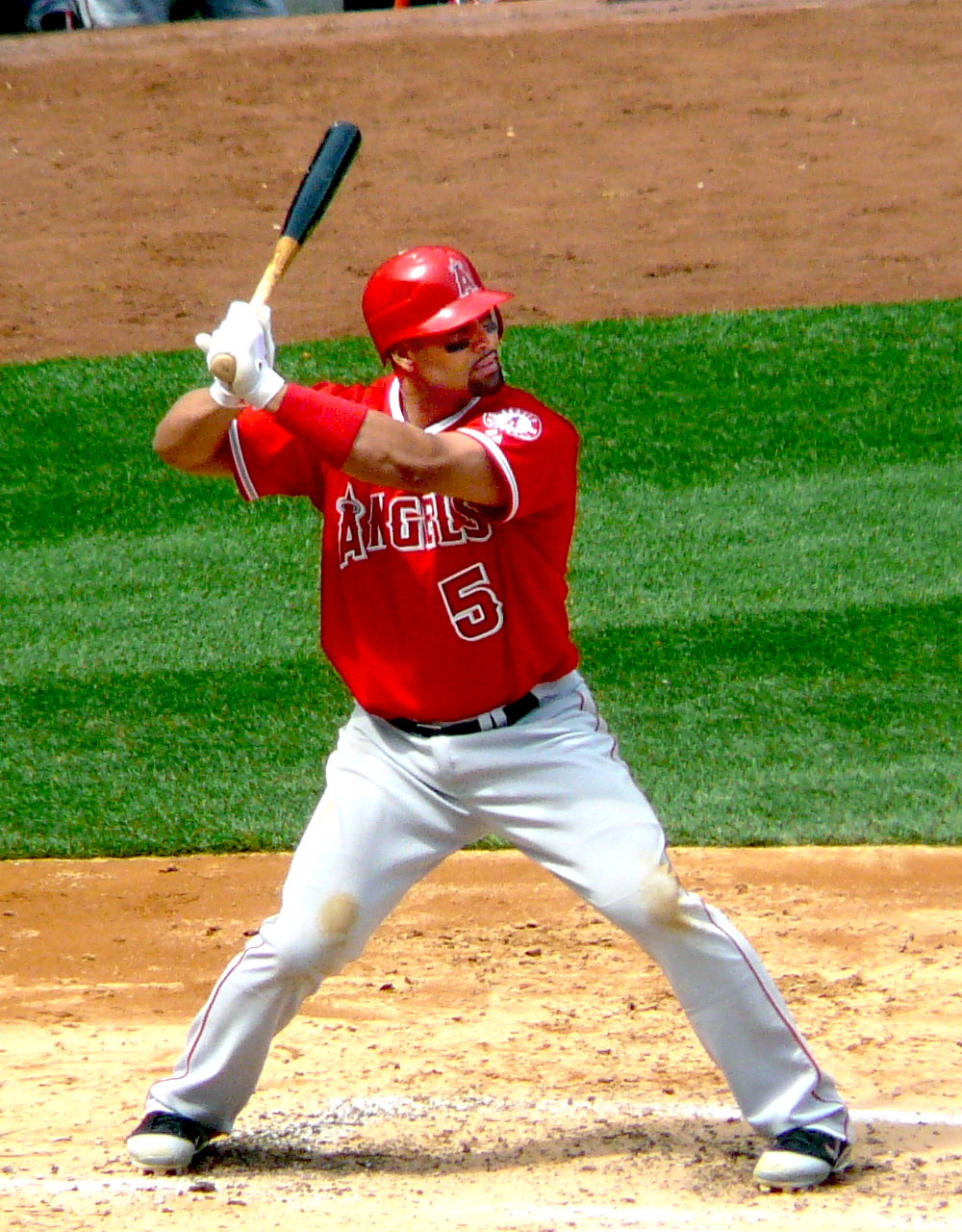
Pujols in 2012

Pujols did not perform very well to begin the 2012 season, batting .217 with no home runs and four RBI in the month of April. Soon after the Angels called up top prospect Mike Trout and fired hitting coach Mickey Hatcher, Pujols' numbers began to rise, as he batted .323 with 13 home runs from May 15 through the All-Star Break. On July 31, he hit two home runs against Derek Holland in a 6–2 victory over the Rangers. After the game, Holland observed that Pujols had "definitely turned it around, no doubt about it... He had a slow start, but he's picked it up. He's a great hitter...." On August 14, Pujols had four RBIs, including a game-winning three-run home run against Ubaldo Jiménez in a 9–6 victory over the Cleveland Indians. In 2012, Pujols batted .285 (at the time, a career low) in 153 games with 173 hits, 50 doubles (second to Alex Gordon's 51), 30 home runs, 105 RBIs (7th in AL), and 85 runs scored.

In 2013, Pujols had by far the worst season of his career to date, failing to play at least 100 games in a season for the first time. Pujols also posted career worsts in hits, runs scored, doubles, home runs, RBI, walks, batting average, on-base percentage, slugging percentage, and OPS. Overall in 99 games, Pujols batted .258 with 101 hits, 19 doubles, 17 home runs, 64 RBI, and 49 runs scored. On August 19, 2013, Pujols was ruled out for the remainder of the 2013 season after suffering a foot injury. In August 2013, on his St. Louis WGNU radio show, former Cardinals player Jack Clark accused Pujols of having used performance-enhancing drugs. Clark served as the Cardinals' hitting coach during the early part of Pujols' tenure in St. Louis. On the morning of August 9, Pujols issued a statement adamantly denying that he had ever taken PEDs. He denounced Clark's allegations as "irresponsible and reckless," and threatened to sue Clark and WGNU over the allegations. Partly due to legal threats from Pujols, InsideSTL Enterprises, which owns WGNU's weekday airtime under a time brokerage agreement, cut ties with Clark. On October 4, 2013, Pujols filed a defamation lawsuit against Clark. In response, Clark challenged Pujols, proposing that they both take polygraph tests to resolve who is telling the truth. However, on February 10, 2014, Clark apologized and retracted his accusations against Pujols, saying he had "no knowledge whatsoever" that Pujols ever used PEDs. "During a heated discussion on air, I misspoke," Clark said. In return, Pujols dropped the suit.

On April 22, 2014, Pujols hit his 499th and 500th home runs off the Washington Nationals' Taylor Jordan at Nationals Park, where he had hit his 400th career home run in the 2010 season. Pujols became the 26th player ever to reach the 500-home-run mark, the third-youngest to reach it, and the only player to hit Nos. 499 and 500 in the same game. On August 10, he played in MLB's longest game of the year, and the longest in the history of Angel Stadium, ending the 19-inning, 6-hours-and-31-minute contest against the Red Sox with a solo home run for a 5–4 final score. It was his first walk-off home run as an Angel and first since June 2011. On September 6, against the Minnesota Twins, Pujols collected his 2,500th career hit, a two-run go-ahead double off of Jared Burton in the 9th inning. He also passed the 1,500-run mark in the same game. In the process, he became the fifth player in major league history with 2,500 hits and 500 home runs while maintaining a .310 lifetime batting average, after Babe Ruth, Jimmie Foxx, Ted Williams and Manny Ramirez.

For the 2014 season, Pujols batted .272 and grounded into an American League-leading 28 double plays. He was tied for the 3rd-highest salary in the AL, at $23 million. After the 2014 season, Pujols traveled to Japan to join a team of MLB All-Stars playing against the All-Stars of Nippon Professional Baseball in the Japan All-Star Series.

Before the 2015 season, Pujols enjoyed his first offseason in his time with the Angels in which he was both free of injury or recuperation from injury. However, his offensive production lagged behind his career levels the first month of the season. By the end of April, Pujols was batting .208 with three home runs and nine RBI in 86 plate appearances. The next month, Pujols' offensive production had started to come around. Between May 28 and June 22, he batted .356 with 15 homers, 30 RBI, and a 1.326 OPS. At this time, he was leading the American League in home runs with 23. After batting .303/.395/.737 with 13 home runs in June 2015, Pujols was named AL Player of the Month for the first time and seventh overall monthly award. His home run total led the major leagues and 73 total bases tied Manny Machado for first in the AL. Remarkably, his batting average on balls in play was .218, significantly lower than the league average of about .300. Selected to the All Star Game, Pujols was announced as a reserve for the American League. Due to an injury just days earlier with Tigers slugger Miguel Cabrera, Pujols instead started at first base. It was his 10th overall selection to the midsummer classic, and first as a member of the Angels. On September 22, Pujols hit his 556th career home run to pass Ramírez for sole possession of 14th place on the all-time career home run leaderboard. In the last game of the season, on October 4, Pujols hit his 40th home run, the seventh time he had done so in a season. Among active MLB players, he trailed only Alex Rodriguez, with eight. With Trout also hitting 40 home runs, the 2015 Angels became just the 31st team in MLB history with multiple players to hit 40+ home runs in a season.

For the 2015 season, he batted .244/.307/.480, and he had the lowest batting average on balls in play (.217) of all major league players. He was tied for the 3rd-highest salary in the AL, at $24 million.

On April 30, 2016, Pujols became the 85th player to make 10,000 career plate appearances. On May 2, Pujols became the 20th player all-time to amass 5,000 career total bases. On August 17, Pujols joined Barry Bonds as the only other player to be intentionally walked over 300 times. Playing the Toronto Blue Jays on August 25, he reached 100 RBI for the 13th time in his career, the fifth player to do so. While playing Cincinnati on August 29, Pujols hit his 26th home run and 103rd RBI of the season. The home run tied him with Frank Robinson for ninth place on the all-time home run list at 586, and allowed him to become the seventh player all-time with 1,200 career extra base hits, and the 21st to reach 1,800 RBI. On September 16, Pujols became the 16th player all-time to reach 600 career doubles.

Pujols batted .268 for the 2016 season. He tied for 2nd in the AL in double plays grounded into, with 24. He had the 6th-highest salary in the league, at $25 million.

==== Later Angels tenure (2017–2021) ====
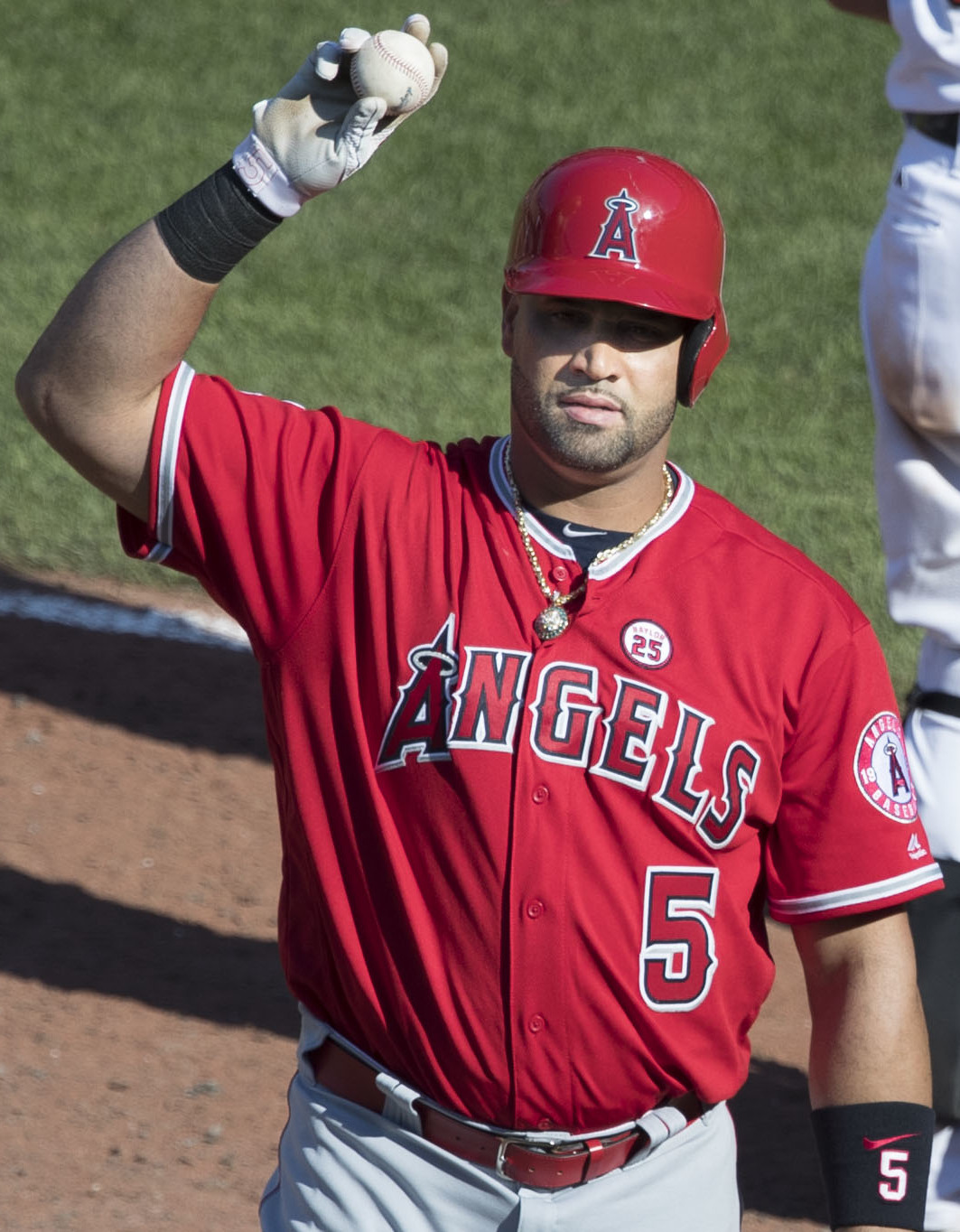
Pujols in 2017

On June 3, 2017, Pujols became the ninth player in Major League history to hit at least 600 home runs, when he hit a grand slam off of Ervin Santana of the Minnesota Twins. He was the fourth-youngest player to achieve the feat (behind Alex Rodriguez, Babe Ruth and Hank Aaron), and the first to hit a grand slam for his 600th home run.

For the 2017 season, Pujols played in 149 games and had 593 at bats, but set career-lows in batting average (.241), on base percentage (.286), slugging percentage (.386), doubles (17), and walks (37), while leading the majors by grounding into 26 double plays. He had the slowest baserunning sprint speed of all major league players, at 21.8 feet/second. He had the 6th-highest salary in the AL, at $26 million.

On May 4, 2018, Pujols recorded his 3,000th major league hit, against Mike Leake of the Seattle Mariners. On July 12, Pujols hit his 630th career home run, moving into a tie with Ken Griffey Jr. for sixth place all-time for that category. The next day, Pujols was placed on the 10-day disabled list due to left knee inflammation. He hit a single on August 10 for his 1,000th hit as an Angel, becoming the ninth player to record 1,000 hits in both the American League and National League. He had surgery on his left knee in August, ending his season, and on his right elbow to remove a bone spur in September.

In 2018, he batted .245/.289/.411 with 19 home runs and 64 RBIs (matching the lowest season total of his career). He had the slowest baserunning sprint speed of all major league players for the second consecutive year, at 22.2 feet/second. He was the sixth-oldest player in the American League. He had the 5th-highest salary in the AL, at $27 million.

On May 9, 2019, Pujols became the fourth player in major league history to record 2,000 RBIs, hitting a solo home run against the Detroit Tigers at Comerica Park. A Tigers fan caught the 2,000 RBI ball but refused to turn it over to MLB officials, saying that he wanted to sleep on it before making a decision. In response, MLB refused to authenticate the ball. The fan, Ely Hydes, eventually decided that he wanted to return the ball to Pujols, who in turn refused, stating that the fan should either keep the ball or donate it to the Baseball Hall of Fame. Pujols hit his 200th home run as an Angel on June 13, becoming only the sixth player to hit 200 home runs with two different teams.

In 2019, he batted .244/.305/.430. Pujols had the lowest line drive percentage of all major league hitters (15.3%), and the 16.7% of balls he hit to the opposite field were the lowest in baseball. He had the second-slowest sprint speed of all major league players, at 22.5 feet/second. He was the third-oldest player in the American League, behind Ichiro Suzuki (who retired in March) and Fernando Rodney. He was tied for the 4th-highest salary in the AL, at $28 million.

At the beginning of the 2020 season, Pujols (at the age of 40) was the oldest player in the major leagues. On August 24, Pujols passed Rodriguez to reach second on the all-time RBIs list with a single against the Astros. With his 2,087th RBI, he trailed only Hank Aaron's 2,297. (Babe Ruth has 2,214 RBIs as recognized by Baseball Reference, but only 1,989 on the official MLB list; MLB does not count pre-1920 RBIs because it was not yet an official statistic.) On September 18, Pujols hit his 661st career home run to pass Willie Mays for fifth place all-time.

In 2020, Pujols batted .224/.270/.395 with 6 home runs and 25 RBIs in 152 at bats. He had the slowest sprint speed of all major league players, at 22.0 feet/second. He was tied for the 7th-highest salary in the league, at $29 million.

Pujols began the 2021 season with the Angels. On May 6, 2021, the Angels designated Pujols for assignment. Through 24 games, Pujols was hitting .198/.250/.372 with five home runs. On May 13, Pujols cleared waivers and became a free agent.

==== Assessment of Angels tenure ====
In nine-plus seasons with the Angels, Pujols hit .256 with 222 homers and 783 runs batted in. During his time with the Angels, the team won the AL West once (in 2014) and won no postseason games.

In 2016, sportswriter Joe Posnanski of NBC Sports described Pujols as "a cautionary tale against big contracts" and "an overpaid designated hitter in the middle of the lineup for a going-nowhere Los Angeles Angels team".

In an August 7, 2018, article entitled "How the shift has ruined Albert Pujols," ESPN sportswriter Alden Gonzalez wrote:

"The recent proliferation of defensive shifts has made it exceedingly difficult for power hitters to turn batted balls into hits, prompting an infatuation with launch angles and breeding a widespread acceptance of strikeouts. Few have been victimized more than Pujols, the aging slugger who still makes frequent contact but no longer runs well... [T]he modern game is especially unforgiving to older hitters, and it has intensified the decline of arguably the greatest first baseman in baseball history."

=== Los Angeles Dodgers (2021) ===
On May 17, 2021, Pujols agreed to a one-year major league deal with the Los Angeles Dodgers. He made his Dodgers debut that night as the starting first baseman against the Arizona Diamondbacks. With his longtime number 5 having been assigned to Corey Seager, Pujols chose the number 55; both as nods to his two former teams, as well as the Bible. "If you know the Bible," Pujols explained, "it's the number of grace. So I feel 5-5, double grace." On May 20, Pujols hit his first home run as a Dodger, a two-run homer off Merrill Kelly of the Diamondbacks. In October, Scott Miller of The New York Times asserted that Pujols had "flourished beyond expectations, scorching lefties for a .306 batting average".

Overall, in 2021 he appeared in 85 games for the Dodgers and hit .254 with a .299 on base percentage, 12 homers, and 38 RBIs. For the second season in a row, he had the slowest baserunning sprint speed of all major league players, at 22.4 feet/second. His line drive percentage of 15.4% was the lowest in the major leagues, and his 16.7% of balls hit to the opposite field was the lowest in the majors. He was the oldest player in the league for the second season in a row, and had the fifth-highest salary at $30 million.

In his first postseason appearance since 2014, he appeared in nine games for the Dodgers, with five hits in 18 at bats for a batting average of .278. Pujols subsequently announced that he would play in the Dominican Professional Baseball League (LIDOM) in the offseason, for Leones del Escogido.

=== Return to St. Louis (2022) ===
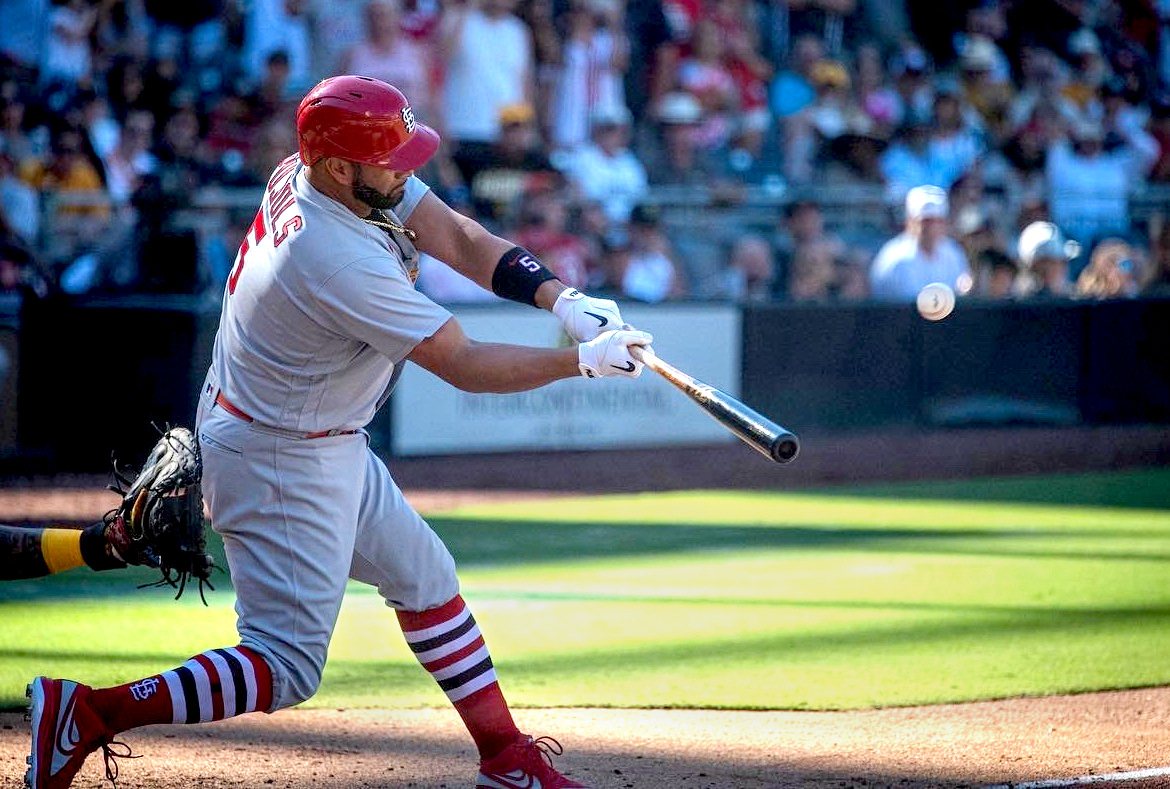
Pujols hits a pitch during a game against the Padres on September 22, 2022.

On March 28, 2022, Pujols signed a one-year contract to return to the St. Louis Cardinals and announced that 2022 would be his final season. He said, "There were a lot of teams interested. It took 12 hours, maybe even less, to get a deal done once we received a call from the Cardinals," adding: "We have the best fans in baseball. It feels like I never left." He was the oldest player in the major leagues for the third season in a row.

On May 15, Pujols made his pitching debut, the oldest player to do so since 1929. In a 15–6 blowout win against the San Francisco Giants, he gave up two home runs and four earned runs in the ninth inning. On June 4 against the Chicago Cubs, he became the 10th major league player to play 3,000 games, appearing as an injury replacement for Corey Dickerson. On June 7 against the Tampa Bay Rays, Pujols singled for his 3,320th career hit, passing Paul Molitor for tenth all-time in hits. On July 10, after the Philadelphia Phillies had shut out the Cardinals in three straight games, Pujols made a rare start against a right-handed pitcher, and his three hits, including a home run, helped spark a 4–3 win. The home run was Pujols' 1,377th extra-base hit, tying him for third all-time with Stan Musial. Pujols was chosen to be on the National League team for the All-Star Game by MLB Commissioner Rob Manfred as a "legacy" selection to honor his career achievements. He was also selected to participate in the Home Run Derby, where he advanced to the second round and fell one home run short of eventual winner Juan Soto.

On August 20, he passed Musial for second place all-time in total bases, trailing only Hank Aaron. Pujols became the first player to produce four hits and two homers in a single game at age 42 or older and was named the National League Player of the Week (alongside teammate Paul Goldschmidt) after hitting .615 with three home runs and seven RBIs. On August 29, Pujols hit a third-inning home run off of Ross Detwiler, the 450th unique pitcher to surrender a home run to Pujols, breaking another MLB record. On September 10 and 11, Pujols hit his 696th and 697th home runs, at PNC Park against the Pittsburgh Pirates, to move into fourth place on the all-time list. On September 14, he became the second player in MLB history to officially compile 2,200 RBIs. (Note: Babe Ruth has over 2,200 RBIs, but unofficially, as he played six seasons before RBIs became a recognized statistic.)

This could have happened last week in St. Louis, which would have been awesome to me, but to allow it to happen tonight in front of my family and friends and people who really care and love me is special.

— Pujols on hitting his 700th home run in Los Angeles.

On September 23, Pujols became the fourth player to hit 700 career home runs. His 699th and 700th home runs came during consecutive at-bats during an 11–0 victory for the Cardinals at Dodger Stadium. He hit No. 699 off Andrew Heaney, his 200th home run off a left-handed pitcher; and his 700th off Phil Bickford, his 500th home run off a right-handed pitcher. On October 2, he hit No. 702 in his last career home game, mirroring the home run he hit in his St. Louis debut two decades earlier. On October 3, he hit No. 703, which gave him undisputed possession of second place on the all-time RBI list, surpassing Babe Ruth's unofficial total. (Note: Babe Ruth has over 2,200 RBIs, but unofficially, as he played six seasons before RBIs became a recognized statistic.) Pujols finished his regular-season career first in double plays grounded into (426), third in sacrifice flies (123), fifth in games played (3,080) and doubles (686), and sixth in at bats (11,421). After the season was finished, Pujols was named National League Comeback Player of the Year.

The Cardinals won the National League Central division, earning a berth in the postseason and enabling Pujols' 10th and final postseason appearance. He went 2-for-8 in the National League Wild Card Series against the Philadelphia Phillies. In Game 2 on October 8, he singled in his last two at-bats. The Phillies won the game, eliminating the Cardinals and bringing Pujols' playing career to an end. On November 1, it was announced that Pujols had signed retirement papers with the Cardinals.

== Post-playing career ==
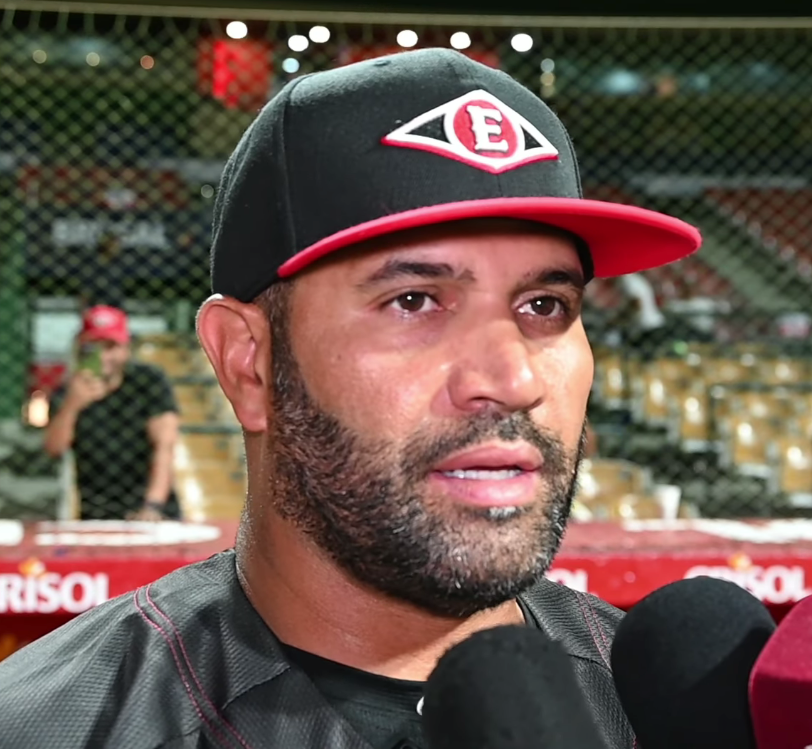
Pujols as manager of the Leones del Escogido in 2024

On February 23, 2023, the Angels hired Pujols as a special assistant as part of a 10–year personal services contract. Since retiring, Pujols has also been an analyst on MLB Network.

In June 2023, Pujols was named the "official global ambassador" of Baseball United, a professional baseball organization in the Middle East and South Asia. He was also reported to have an ownership interest in the league.

After his playing career, Pujols has also been involved in the managerial side of things, a rarity for all-time greats. In February 2024, Pujols was named the manager of the Leones del Escogido. The Leones del Escogido won the Serie Final of the 2024–25 season and the 2025 Caribbean Series. Ramón Santiago was hired to replace Pujols for the 2025–26 season. On December 28, 2025, the Estrellas Orientales announced that Pujols would be part of the organization. He was later confirmed to be the President of Baseball Operations of the team for the 2026-27 season.

== Playing style ==
Pujols' swing was praised for its consistency. "It's the same swing every time," former teammate Lance Berkman once said. "He has the ability to repeat his swing over and over and over, which leads to him being very consistent," Cardinals' video coordinator Chad Blair said. Sports Illustrated writer Daniel G. Habib described the swing as "quick" and "quiet". Pujols used a 32.5-ounce bat against right-handed pitchers, but used a 33-ounce bat against left-handers to avoid trying to pull the ball when he swung. He credited his hitting ability partly to learning what pitchers would do in certain counts and situations:

I can tell right away from the first pitch if they're going to pitch to me or not with men on base. I need to be aggressive and make sure I look for my pitch and be ready. If it's there, be ready to swing. If it's not there, take it. There's just something there in my mind and you know right away the situation will dictate the situation you're in.

— The New York Times: May 31, 2009

== Accomplishments and accolades ==
Pujols is second in major league history in runs batted in and total bases behind only Hank Aaron. He and Aaron are the only two players to amass 3,000 hits, 700 home runs, and 2,200 RBIs. (Note: Babe Ruth has over 2,200 RBIs, but unofficially, as he played six seasons before RBIs became a recognized statistic.) Only two other players (Stan Musial and Willie Mays) have surpassed 6,000 total bases. Pujols hit home runs off of a record 458 different pitchers over the course of his career, and is fourth in career home runs and fifth in doubles. In 2009, Pujols set the major league single-season record for assists by a first baseman with 185. In an age when seasons of 150+ strikeouts were the norm for sluggers, he never struck out 100 times in a season.

Pujols earned uncommonly high praise from players and coaches throughout his career. In 2008, he was named the most feared hitter in baseball in a poll of all 30 MLB managers. National League Central Division rival Joey Votto referred to Pujols as "one of the greatest hitters of all time" while former teammate Brendan Ryan said, "He's the best there is." Hall of Fame manager Tony La Russa called him "the best player I've ever managed."

Given his career achievements, Pujols is widely expected to be inducted into the Hall of Fame and potentially a unanimous selection the first year in which he becomes eligible (2028).

=== Awards and honors ===
Championships earned or shared
Title	Times	Dates	Ref
National League batting champion	1	2003	
National League champion	3	2004, 2006, 2011	
Pacific Coast League champion	1	2000	
World Series champion	2	2006, 2011	

Awards received
Name of award	Times	Dates	Ref
Baseball America Major League Player of the Year	1	2005	
ESPY Award for Best International Athlete	2	2005, 2006	
ESPY Award for Best MLB Player	4	2005, 2006, 2009, 2010	
Fielding Bible Award at first base	5	2006−09, 2011	
GIBBY/This Year in Baseball Awards for Hitter of the Year	2	2003, 2008	
Hank Aaron Award	2	2003, 2009	
Heart and Hustle Award	1	2009	
League Championship Series Most Valuable Player	1	2004	
MLB All-Star	11	2001, 2003−10, 2015, 2022	
MLB Player of the Month	7	May 2003, June 2003, April 2006, April 2009, June 2009, August 2010, June 2015	
MLB Player of the Week	14	Sep. 22, 2001 (with José Mesa); Jul. 7, 2002; May 4, 2003; Jun. 5, 2005 (with Nick Johnson); May 14, 2006 (with Nomar Garciaparra); Jul. 15, 2007; Aug. 24, 2008; Sep. 28, 2008; Apr. 26, 2009; Jun. 21, 2009; Jun. 5, 2011; Aug. 5, 2012; Aug. 20, 2022 (with Paul Goldschmidt); Sept. 24, 2022 (with Pete Alonso);	
National League Most Valuable Player	3	2005, 2008, 2009	
National League Rookie of the Year	1	2001	
Pacific Coast League Postseason Most Valuable Player	1	2000	
Pepsi Clutch Performer of the Month	1	April 2010	
Players Choice Award for Major League Player of the Year	3	2003, 2008, 2009	
Players Choice Award for Marvin Miller Man of the Year	1	2006	
Players Choice Award for National League Outstanding Player	3	2003, 2008, 2009	
Rawlings Gold Glove Award at first base	2	2006, 2010	
Roberto Clemente Award	1	2008	
Silver Slugger Award	6	at 3B: 2001; at OF: 2003; at 1B: 2004, 2008−10	
The Sporting News Player of the Decade	1	2000−09	
The Sporting News Player of the Year	3	2003, 2008, 2009	
Sports Illustrated Player of the Decade	1	2000−09	

National League statistical leader
Category	Times	Seasons
Batting champion	1	2003
Doubles leader	1	2003
Extra base hits leader	4	2003, 2004, 2009, 2010
Hits leader	1	2003
Home run leader	2	2009, 2010
On-base percentage leader	1	2009
On-base plus slugging leader	3	2006, 2008, 2009
OPS+ leader	4	2006, 2008, 2009, 2010
Runs batted in leader	1	2010
Runs scored leader	5	2003−05, 2009, 2010
Slugging percentage leader	3	2006, 2008, 2009
Total bases leader	4	2003, 2004, 2008, 2009
Grounded into double plays leader	2	2007, 2011

Notes: Per Baseball-Reference.com.

== Other endeavors ==
=== Business ventures ===
In 2006, Pujols and the Hanon family opened Pujols 5 Westport Grill, a restaurant located in Westport Plaza of Maryland Heights, Missouri. A 10-foot, 1,100-lb. statue of Pujols was dedicated on November 2, 2011, outside the restaurant. An anonymous donor commissioned sculptor Harry Weber to create the statue, which belongs to the Pujols Family Foundation. After Pujols signed with the Angels, the restaurant was renamed the St. Louis Sports Hall of Fame Grill.

In 2008, Pujols teamed up with St. Louis Soccer United, a group looking to bring a Major League Soccer (MLS) franchise to the St. Louis area. However, the group's bid for a franchise was unsuccessful, and a USL team (Saint Louis FC) was formed.

=== Charitable work ===
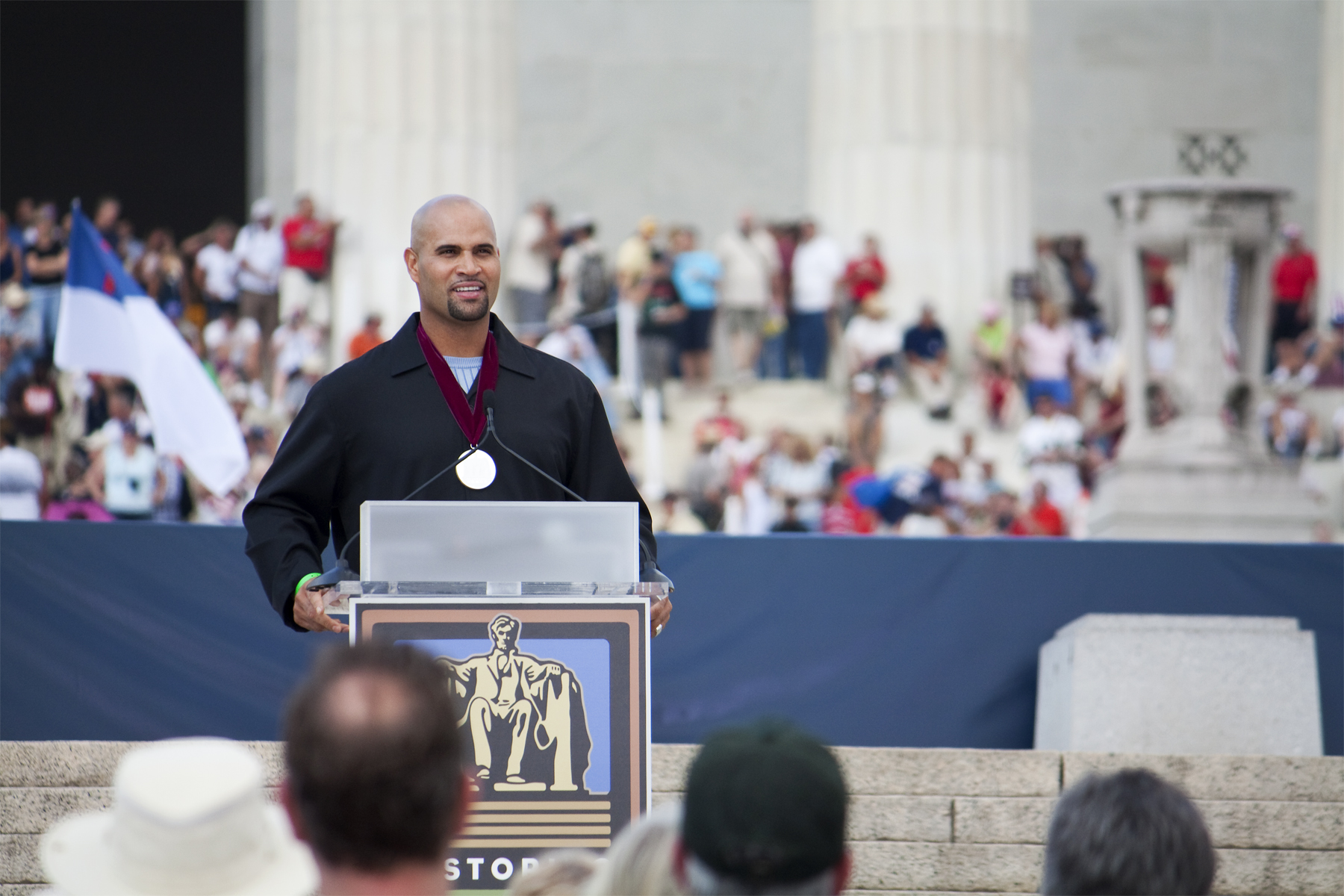
Pujols at Glenn Beck's "Restoring Honor" rally

In 2005, Albert and Deidre Pujols launched the Pujols Family Foundation, a 501(c)(3) non-profit dedicated to their "commitment to faith, family and others." The organization promotes awareness of Down syndrome and works to support those who have it and their families, aids the poor in the Dominican Republic, and supports people with disabilities and/or life-threatening illnesses. Among other activities, the foundation hosts events for people with Down syndrome. The foundation gave the Down Syndrome Association of Greater St. Louis the resources to open an office and hire staff. In 2009, the Albert Pujols Wellness Center for Adults with Down Syndrome opened in Chesterfield, Missouri; Pujols was present at the opening on November 18. The foundation hosts an annual "All Stars Basketball Game" with down syndrome players at Missouri Baptist University.

Pujols has been a part of several medical missions to the Dominican Republic, by taking supplies as well as supporting doctors and dentists for those in need medical care. The Pujols Family Foundation also holds an annual golf tournament to raise money to send dentists to the Dominican Republic.

In 2009, Pujols donated money to the Mike Coolbaugh Memorial Tournament, allowing the event to occur after a sponsor backed out. On August 28, 2010, Pujols and La Russa attended Glenn Beck's "Restoring Honor" rally in Washington, D.C., after being assured by Beck that the rally was not political. During the rally, Pujols was presented with a medal for his off-the-field efforts.

== Personal life ==
Pujols married Deidre Pujols on January 1, 2000. They have five children. He filed for divorce on April 4, 2022, after 22 years of marriage, citing irreconcilable differences. Pujols is a devout evangelical Christian. He became an evangelical Christian on November 13, 1998, influenced in part by Deidre and his grandmother. During his first tenure with the Cardinals, Pujols and his family attended West County Community Church, a Southern Baptist church in Wildwood, Missouri.

On September 2, 2023, Pujols married Nicole Fernandez, the daughter of former President of the Dominican Republic, Leonel Fernández. The two had been dating since September 2022, shortly before Pujols’ playing career ended.

During his playing days, even with the Angels and Dodgers, Pujols lived in St. Louis during the offseason. He owned a home in Irvine, California, but put it up for sale in 2016. Pujols is a supporter of people with Down syndrome, a condition his daughter Isabella was born with. In 2007, Pujols became a U.S. citizen, scoring a perfect 100 on his citizenship test.

Pujols is close friends with third baseman Plácido Polanco, a former teammate with the Cardinals. Polanco has called Pujols his "closest friend in baseball", and Pujols is the godfather to Polanco's son, Ishmael. Pujols is also friends with Robinson Canó, who selected Pujols' Angels teammate Mark Trumbo for the 2012 Home Run Derby after being asked to by Pujols.

== See also ==
- List of Afro-Latinos
- List of Dominican Americans
- List of Major League Baseball annual doubles leaders
- List of Major League Baseball annual home run leaders
- List of Major League Baseball annual runs batted in leaders
- List of Major League Baseball annual runs scored leaders
- List of Major League Baseball batting champions
- List of Major League Baseball career at bat leaders
- List of Major League Baseball career bases on balls leaders
- List of Major League Baseball career intentional bases on balls leaders
- List of Major League Baseball career doubles leaders
- List of Major League Baseball career extra base hits leaders
- List of Major League Baseball career hits leaders
- List of Major League Baseball career hit by pitch leaders
- List of Major League Baseball career home run leaders
- List of Major League Baseball career OPS leaders
- List of Major League Baseball career plate appearance leaders
- List of Major League Baseball career runs batted in leaders
- List of Major League Baseball career runs scored leaders
- List of Major League Baseball career slugging percentage leaders
- List of Major League Baseball career total bases leaders
- List of Major League Baseball doubles records
- List of Major League Baseball hit records
- List of Major League Baseball home run records
- List of Major League Baseball players from the Dominican Republic
- List of Major League Baseball runs batted in records
- List of Major League Baseball runs records
- List of St. Louis Cardinals team records
- Los Angeles Angels all-time roster
- St. Louis Cardinals all-time roster
- St. Louis Cardinals award winners and league leaders

== Notes ==
Awards and achievements
Preceded by Rafael Furcal	Baseball America Rookie of the Year; 2001	Succeeded by Eric Hinske
Preceded by Rafael Furcal	Sporting News NL Rookie of the Year; 2001	Succeeded by Brad Wilkerson
Preceded by Rafael Furcal	Players Choice NL Most Outstanding Rookie; 2001	Succeeded by Jason Jennings
Preceded by Mike Lamb	Topps Rookie All-Star Third Baseman; 2001	Succeeded by Eric Hinske
Preceded by Todd Helton; Randy Winn	National League Player of the Month; May 2003 – June 2003; April 2006	Succeeded by Barry Bonds; Jason Bay
Preceded by Derrek Lee; Ryan Braun	National League slugging percentage leader 2006; 2008–2009	Succeeded by Ryan Braun; Joey Votto
