= List of Major League Baseball runs records =

Players denoted in boldface are still actively contributing to the record noted.

(r) denotes a player's rookie season.

== 1800+ career runs scored ==
Player	Runs	Teams and seasons
Rickey Henderson	2295	Oakland Athletics (1979–84, 89–93, 94–95, 98), New York Yankees (1985–89), Toronto Blue Jays (1993), San Diego Padres (1996–97, 2001), Anaheim Angels (1997), New York Mets (1999–2000), Seattle Mariners (2000), Boston Red Sox (2002), Los Angeles Dodgers (2003)
Ty Cobb	2245	Detroit Tigers (1905–26), Philadelphia Athletics (1927–28)
Barry Bonds	2227	Pittsburgh Pirates (1986–92), San Francisco Giants (1993–2007)
Babe Ruth	2174	Boston Red Sox (1914–19), New York Yankees (1920–34), Boston Braves (1935)
Hank Aaron	2174	Mil-Atl Braves (1954–74), Milwaukee Brewers (1975–76)
Pete Rose	2165	Cincinnati Reds (1963–78, 84–86), Philadelphia Phillies (1979–83), Montreal Expos (1984)
Willie Mays	2068	NY-SF Giants (1951–52, 54–72), New York Mets (1972–73)
Alex Rodriguez	2021	Seattle Mariners (1994–2000), Texas Rangers (2001–03), New York Yankees (2004–2016)
Cap Anson	1999	Rockford Forest Citys (1871), Philadelphia Athletics (1872–75), Chicago Cubs (1876–97)
Stan Musial	1949	St. Louis Cardinals (1941–44, 46–63)
Derek Jeter	1923	New York Yankees (1995–2014)
Lou Gehrig	1888	New York Yankees (1923–39)
Tris Speaker	1882	Boston Red Sox (1907–15), Cleveland Indians (1916–26), Washington Senators (1927), Philadelphia Athletics (1928)
Albert Pujols	1872	St. Louis Cardinals (2001–11), Los Angeles Angels (2012–2021), Los Angeles Dodgers (2021)
Mel Ott	1859	New York Giants (1926–47)
Craig Biggio	1844	Houston Astros (1988–2007)
Frank Robinson	1829	Cincinnati Reds (1956–65), Baltimore Orioles (1966–71), Los Angeles Dodgers (1972), California Angels (1973–74), Cleveland Indians (1974–76)
Eddie Collins	1821	Philadelphia Athletics (1906–14, 27–30), Chicago White Sox (1915–26)
Carl Yastrzemski	1816	Boston Red Sox (1961–83)

=== Active players with 1200+ runs scored ===
(through 2025 season)

Player	Runs	Teams and seasons
**Freddie Freeman**	1379	Atlanta Braves (2010–21), Los Angeles Dodgers (2022–present)
**Andrew McCutchen**	1290	Pittsburgh Pirates (2009–17, 2023–present), San Francisco Giants (2018), New York Yankees (2018), Philadelphia Phillies (2019–21), Milwaukee Brewers (2022)
**Paul Goldschmidt**	1280	Arizona Diamondbacks (2011–18), St. Louis Cardinals (2019–24), New York Yankees (2025–present)
**Jose Altuve**	1236	Houston Astros (2011–present)

== Top 10 career runs scored leaders by league ==
American League Player	Runs	National League Player	Runs
Ty Cobb	2245	Barry Bonds	2227
Babe Ruth	2161	Pete Rose	2165
Alex Rodriguez	2021	Hank Aaron	2107
Rickey Henderson	1939	Willie Mays	2062
Derek Jeter	1923	Stan Musial	1949
Lou Gehrig	1888	Mel Ott	1859
Tris Speaker	1882	Craig Biggio	1844
Eddie Collins	1821	Honus Wagner	1736
Carl Yastrzemski	1816	Cap Anson	1719
Ted Williams	1798	Paul Waner	1626

== 155 runs scored in one season ==
Player	Runs	Team	Season
Billy Hamilton	198	Philadelphia Phillies	1894
Babe Ruth	177	New York Yankees	1921
Lou Gehrig	167	New York Yankees	1936
Billy Hamilton	166	Philadelphia Phillies	1895
Arlie Latham	163	St. Louis Cardinals (AA)	1887
Babe Ruth	163	New York Yankees	1928
Lou Gehrig	163	New York Yankees	1931
Hugh Duffy	160	Boston Beaneaters	1894
Bobby Lowe	158	Boston Beaneaters	1894
Babe Ruth	158	New York Yankees	1920
Babe Ruth	158	New York Yankees	1927
Chuck Klein	158	Philadelphia Phillies	1930
Rogers Hornsby	156	Chicago Cubs	1929
King Kelly	155	Chicago White Stockings	1886
Kiki Cuyler	155	Chicago Cubs	1930

== Seven or more seasons with 120 runs scored ==
Player	Seasons	Seasons and teams
Lou Gehrig	12	1926–37 (New York Yankees)
Babe Ruth	11	1920–21, 23–24, 26–32 (New York Yankees)
Sliding Billy Hamilton	8	1889 (Kansas City Blues (AA)), 1890–92, 94–95 (Philadelphia Phillies), 1896–97 (Boston Beaneaters)
Jimmie Foxx	8	1929–30, 32–34 (Philadelphia Athletics), 1936, 38–39 (Boston Red Sox)
Ted Williams	8	1939–42, 46–49 (Boston Red Sox)
Alex Rodriguez	8	1996, 98, 2000 (Seattle Mariners), 2001–03 (Texas Rangers), 2005, 07 (New York Yankees)
Hugh Duffy	7	1889 (Chicago White Stockings), 1890 (Chicago Pirates (PL)), 1891 (Boston Reds (AA)), 1892–94, 97 (Boston Beaneaters)
Willie Keeler	7	1894–98 (Baltimore Orioles (NL)), 1899, 1901 (Brooklyn Superbas)
Charlie Gehringer	7	1929–30, 34–38 (Detroit Tigers)
Barry Bonds	7	1993, 96–98, 2000–01, 04 (San Francisco Giants)

=== Five or more consecutive seasons with 120 runs scored ===
Player	Seasons	Seasons and teams
Lou Gehrig	12	1926–37 (New York Yankees)
Ted Williams	8	1939–42, 46–49 (Boston Red Sox)^{1}
Babe Ruth	7	1926–32 (New York Yankees)
Hugh Duffy	6	1889 (Chicago White Stockings), 1890 (Chicago Pirates (PL)), 1891 (Boston Reds (AA)), 1892–94 (Boston Beaneaters)
Willie Keeler	6	1894–98 (Baltimore Orioles (NL)), 1899 (Brooklyn Superbas)
Jesse Burkett	5	1893–97 (Cleveland Spiders (NL))
Charlie Gehringer	5	1934–38 (Detroit Tigers)
Mickey Mantle	5	1954–58 (New York Yankees)

== Eleven or more seasons with 100 runs scored ==
Player	Seasons	Seasons and teams
Hank Aaron	15	1955–67, 69–70 (Mil-Atl Braves)
Lou Gehrig	13	1926–38 (New York Yankees)
Alex Rodriguez	13	1996–2000 (Seattle Mariners), 2001–03 (Texas Rangers), 2004–08 (New York Yankees)
Derek Jeter	13	1996–2002, 04–07, 09–10 (New York Yankees)
Rickey Henderson	13	1980, 82–84, 90–91, 98 (Oakland Athletics), 85–86, 88 (New York Yankees), 89 (NY Yankees–Oak Athletics), 93 (Oak Athletics–Tor Blue Jays), 96 (San Diego Padres)
Charlie Gehringer	12	1927–30, 1932–38, 40 (Detroit Tigers)
Willie Mays	12	1954–65 (NY-SF Giants)
George Van Haltren	11	1889 (Chicago White Stockings), 91–92 (Baltimore Orioles), 93 (Pittsburgh Pirates), 94–1900 (New York Giants)
Ty Cobb	11	1909–12, 15–17, 21, 23–24 (Detroit Tigers), 27 (Philadelphia Athletics)
Babe Ruth	11	1919 (Boston Red Sox), 1920–21, 23–24, 26–32 (New York Yankees)
Jimmie Foxx	11	1929–30, 32–35 (Philadelphia Athletics), 36–40 (Boston Red Sox)
Stan Musial	11	1943–44, 46–54 (St. Louis Cardinals)

=== Nine or more consecutive seasons with 100 runs scored ===
Player	Seasons	Seasons and teams
Lou Gehrig	13	1926–38 (New York Yankees)
Hank Aaron	13	1955–1967 (Milwaukee Braves) (Atlanta Braves)
Alex Rodriguez	13	1996–2000 (Seattle Mariners), 2001–03 (Texas Rangers), 2004–08 (New York Yankees)
Willie Mays	12	1954–65 (NY-SF Giants)
Stan Musial	11	1943–44, 46–54 (St. Louis Cardinals)
Billy Hamilton	10	1889 (Kansas City Blues (AA)), 1890–95 (Philadelphia Phillies), 1896–98 (Boston Beaneaters)
George Van Haltren	10	1891–92 (Baltimore Orioles), 93 (Pittsburgh Pirates), 94–1900 (New York Giants)
Harry Stovey	9	1883–89 (Philadelphia Athletics (AA)), 1890 (Boston Reds (PL)), 1891 (Boston Beaneaters)
Mickey Mantle	9	1953–61 (New York Yankees)
Johnny Damon	9	1998–2000 (Kansas City Royals), 2001 (Oakland Athletics), 02–05 (Boston Red Sox), 2006 (New York Yankees)

== League leader in runs scored, 5 or more seasons ==
Player	Titles	Years and teams
Babe Ruth	8	1919 (Boston Red Sox), 1920–21, 1923–24, 1926–28 (New York Yankees)
Ted Williams	6	1940–42, 46–47, 49 (Boston Red Sox)
Mickey Mantle	6	1954, 56–58, 60–61 (New York Yankees)
Ty Cobb	5	1909–11, 15–16 (Detroit Tigers)
George Burns	5	1914, 16–17, 19–20 (New York Giants)
Rogers Hornsby	5	1921–22, 24, 27 (St. Louis Cardinals), 29 (Chicago Cubs)
Stan Musial	5	1946, 48, 51–52, 54 (St. Louis Cardinals)
Rickey Henderson	5	1981, 90 (Oakland Athletics), 85–86 (New York Yankees), 89 (NY Yankees–Oak Athletics)
Alex Rodriguez	5	1996 (Seattle Mariners), 2001, 03 (Texas Rangers), 05, 07 (New York Yankees)
**Albert Pujols**	5	2003–05,09-10 (St. Louis Cardinals)

=== League leader in runs scored, 3 or more consecutive seasons ===
Player	Titles	Seasons & Teams
Harry Stovey	3	1883-85 Philadelphia Athletics (AA)
King Kelly	3	1884-85 Chicago White Stockings
Ty Cobb	3	1909-11 Detroit Tigers
Eddie Collins	3	1912-14 Philadelphia Athletics
Babe Ruth	3	1919 (Boston Red Sox), 20-21 (New York Yankees)
Babe Ruth	3	1926-28 (New York Yankees)
Chuck Klein	3	1930-32 (Philadelphia Phillies)
Ted Williams	3	1940-42 (Boston Red Sox)
Mickey Mantle	3	1956-58 (New York Yankees)
Pete Rose	3	1974-76 (Cincinnati Reds)
Albert Pujols	3	2003-05 (St. Louis Cardinals)
Mike Trout	3	2012-14 (Los Angeles Angels)

=== League leader in runs scored, both leagues ===
Player	League, team and year
Frank Robinson	NL: Cincinnati Reds (1956), AL: Baltimore Orioles (1966)

=== League leader in runs scored, three different teams ===
Player	Teams and years
Rogers Hornsby	St. Louis Cardinals (1921–22, 24), New York Giants (1927), Chicago Cubs (1929)
Alex Rodriguez	Seattle Mariners (1996), Texas Rangers (2001, 03), New York Yankees (2005)

== 1000 runs scored by a team in one season ==
Runs	Team	Season
1220	Boston Beaneaters	1894
1143	Philadelphia Phillies	1894
1131	St. Louis Cardinals	1887
1068	Philadelphia Phillies	1895
1067	New York Yankees	1931
1065	New York Yankees	1936
1062	New York Yankees	1930
1041	Chicago Colts	1894
1027	Boston Red Sox	1950
1025	Boston Beaneaters	1897
1021	Brooklyn Grooms	1894
1011	Philadelphia Phillies	1893
1009	Cleveland Indians	1999
1008	Boston Beaneaters	1893
1004	St. Louis Cardinals	1930
1002	New York Yankees	1932

== One or more runs scored in each inning of a game ==
Team	Date	Opponent	Venue^{2}	Score
Cleveland Spiders	August 15, 1889	Boston Beaneaters	League Park	19–8
Washington Senators (NL)	June 22, 1894	Boston Beaneaters	Boundary Field	26–12
Cleveland Spiders	July 12, 1894	Philadelphia Phillies	League Park	20–10
Chicago Colts	June 29, 1897	Louisville Colonels	West Side Park	36–7
Boston Americans	September 16, 1903	Cleveland Indians	Huntington Avenue Grounds	14–7
New York Giants	June 1, 1923	Philadelphia Phillies	Baker Bowl	22–8
Cleveland Indians	July 7, 1923^{3}	Boston Red Sox	League Park	27–3
St. Louis Cardinals	June 9, 1935	Chicago Cubs	Sportsman Park III	13-2
New York Yankees	July 26, 1939	St. Louis Browns	Yankee Stadium	14–1
Chicago White Sox	May 11, 1949	Boston Red Sox	Comiskey Park	12–8
St. Louis Cardinals	September 13, 1964	Chicago Cubs	Wrigley Field	15–2
Chicago Cubs	September 1, 1978	Houston Astros	Wrigley Field	14-11
Kansas City Royals	September 14, 1998	Oakland Athletics	Kauffman Stadium	16–6
Colorado Rockies	May 5, 1999	Chicago Cubs	Wrigley Field	13–6
Colorado Rockies	September 24, 2001	San Diego Padres	Coors Field	15-11
New York Yankees	April 29, 2006	Toronto Blue Jays	Yankee Stadium	17–6
Detroit Tigers	August 2, 2014	Colorado Rockies	Comerica Park	11–5
Milwaukee Brewers	August 11, 2016	Atlanta Braves	Miller Park	11–3
Chicago White Sox	September 12, 2016	Cleveland Indians	U.S. Cellular Field	11–4

== Notes ==
1. Ted Williams did not play 1943–45 due to military service in World War II.
2. The Chicago Colts, New York Giants, 1964 St. Louis Cardinals and 1999 Colorado Rockies accomplished their feats on the road, meaning they scored in all 9 innings they batted and are the sole instances of a team scoring a run in 9 innings. All remaining teams accomplished this feat at home, meaning they only scored in all 8 innings they batted.
3. Game 1 of a doubleheader.

== See also ==
- Run (baseball)
