= List of Major League Baseball runs batted in records =

Major League Baseball has numerous records related to runs batted in (RBI).

== Key ==
*	denotes elected to National Baseball Hall of Fame.
**Bold**	denotes active player.
**(r)**	denotes a player's rookie season.

Players and the columns that correspond are denoted in boldface if they are still actively contributing to the record noted.

== 160 batted in, one season ==
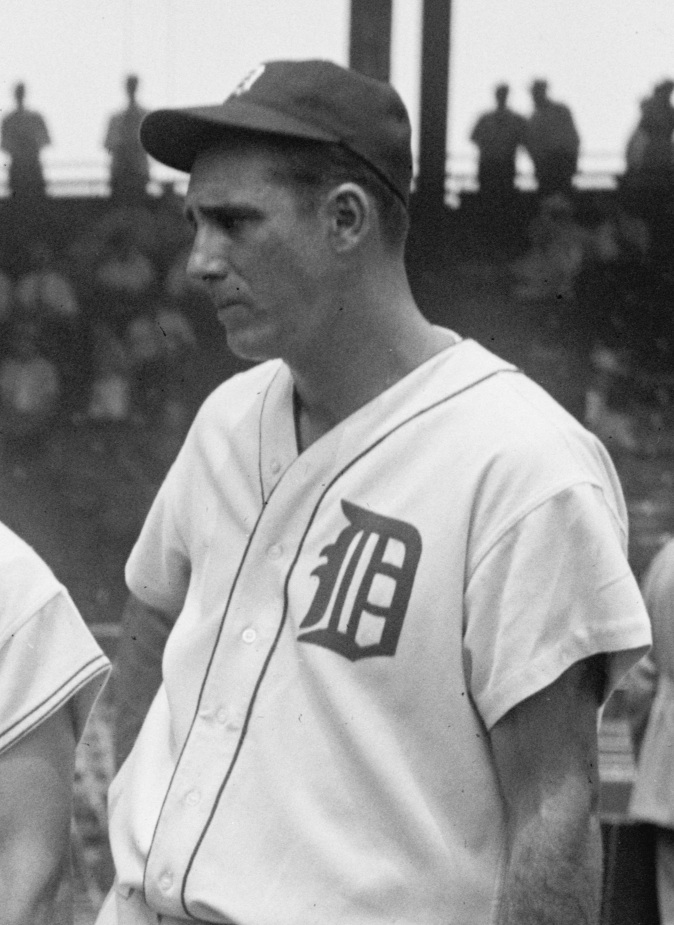
Hank Greenberg, Hall of Famer and two-time MVP

Player	RBI	Team	Season
Hack Wilson *	191	Chicago Cubs	1930
Lou Gehrig *	185	New York Yankees	1931
Hank Greenberg *	184	Detroit Tigers	1937
Jimmie Foxx *	175	Boston Red Sox	1938
Lou Gehrig *	173	New York Yankees	1927
Lou Gehrig *	173	New York Yankees	1930
Chuck Klein *	170	Philadelphia Phillies	1930
Jimmie Foxx *	169	Philadelphia Athletics	1932
Babe Ruth *	168	New York Yankees	1921
Hank Greenberg *	168	Detroit Tigers	1935
Joe DiMaggio *	167	New York Yankees	1937
Sam Thompson *	166	Detroit Wolverines	1887
Lou Gehrig *	166	New York Yankees	1934
Sam Thompson *	165	Philadelphia Phillies	1895
Babe Ruth *	165	New York Yankees	1927
Al Simmons *	165	Philadelphia Athletics	1930
Manny Ramirez	165	Cleveland Indians	1999
Jimmie Foxx *	163	Philadelphia Athletics	1933
Babe Ruth *	162	New York Yankees	1931
Hal Trosky	162	Cleveland Indians	1936
Sammy Sosa	160	Chicago Cubs	2001

== Evolution of the single season record for runs batted in ==
RBI	Player	Team	Year	Years record stood
60	Deacon White *	Chicago White Stockings	1876	3
62	Charley Jones	Boston Red Caps	1879	1
62	John O'Rourke **(r)**	Boston Red Caps	1879	1
74	Cap Anson *	Chicago White Stockings	1880	1
82	Cap Anson *	Chicago White Stockings	1881	1
83	Cap Anson *	Chicago White Stockings	1882	1
97	Dan Brouthers *	Buffalo Bisons	1883	1
102	Cap Anson *	Chicago White Stockings	1884	1
108	Cap Anson *	Chicago White Stockings	1885	1
147	Cap Anson *	Chicago White Stockings	1886	1
166	Sam Thompson *	Detroit Wolverines	1887	34
168	Babe Ruth *	New York Yankees	1921	6
173	Lou Gehrig *	New York Yankees	1927	3
191	Hack Wilson *	Chicago Cubs	1930	**95**

== Four or more seasons with 130 runs batted in ==
Player	Years	Seasons and teams
Babe Ruth *	10	1920–21, 23, 26–32 New York (AL)
Lou Gehrig *	9	1927–28, 30–34, 36–37 New York (AL)
Jimmie Foxx *	6	1930, 32–34 Philadelphia; 36, 38 Boston (AL)
Hank Greenberg *	5	1934–35, 37–38, 40 Detroit
Alex Rodriguez	5	2000 Seattle; 01-02 Texas; 05, 07 New York (AL)
Ryan Howard	4	2006–09 Philadelphia (NL)
Joe DiMaggio *	4	1937–38, 40, 48 New York (AL)
Juan González	4	1996–98 Texas; 2001 Cleveland
Ken Griffey Jr. *	4	1996–99 Seattle
Sammy Sosa	4	1998–2001 Chicago (NL)
Manny Ramirez	4	1998–99 Cleveland; 2004–05 Boston (AL)

== Five or more consecutive seasons with 120 runs batted in ==
Player	Years	Seasons and teams
Lou Gehrig *	8	1927–34 New York (AL)
Babe Ruth *	7	1926–32 New York (AL)
Joe DiMaggio *	6	1936–41 New York (AL)
Jim Bottomley *	5	1925–29 St. Louis (NL)
Chuck Klein *	5	1929–33 Philadelphia (NL)
Jimmie Foxx *	5	1930–34 Philadelphia (AL)
Hank Aaron *	5	1959–63 Milwaukee (NL)

== Ten or more seasons with 100 runs batted in ==
Player	Years	Seasons and teams
Alex Rodriguez	14	1996, 98–2000 Seattle; 01–03 Texas; 04–10 New York (AL)
Albert Pujols	14	2001–10 St. Louis (NL), 12, 14, 16, 17 Los Angeles Angels
Babe Ruth *	13	1919 Boston (AL); 20–21, 23–24, 26–33 New York (AL)
Lou Gehrig *	13	1926–38 New York (AL)
Jimmie Foxx *	13	1929–35 Philadelphia (AL); 36–41 Boston (AL)
Al Simmons *	12	1924–32 Philadelphia (AL); 33–34 Chicago (AL); 36 Detroit
Barry Bonds	12	1990–92 Pittsburgh; 93, 95–98, 2000–02, 04 San Francisco
Manny Ramirez	12	1995–96, 98–2000 Cleveland; 01-06 Boston (AL); 08 Boston (AL)-Los Angeles (NL)
Miguel Cabrera	12	2004–2007 Florida; 08–14, 16 Detroit
Goose Goslin *	11	1924–28 Washington (AL); 30 Washington (AL)-St. Louis (AL); 31–32 St. Louis (AL); 34–36 Detroit
Frank Thomas *	11	1991–98, 2000, 03 Chicago (AL); 06 Oakland
Stan Musial *	10	1946, 48–51, 53–57 St. Louis (NL)
Willie Mays *	10	1954–55, 59–66 New York-San Francisco
Hank Aaron *	11	1955, 1957, 59–63, 66–67, 70–71 Milwaukee-Atlanta
Joe Carter	10	1986–87, 89 Cleveland; 90 San Diego; 91–94, 96–97 Toronto
Rafael Palmeiro	10	1993, 99–2003 Texas; 95–98 Baltimore
Vladimir Guerrero *	10	1998–2002 Montreal; 2004 Anaheim; 2005–2007 Los Angeles Angels; 2008 Texas
David Ortiz *	10	2003–2007, 2010, 2013–2016 Boston

== Eight or more consecutive seasons with 100 runs batted in ==
Player	Years	Seasons and teams
Lou Gehrig *	13	1926–38 New York (AL)
Jimmie Foxx *	13	1929–35 Philadelphia (AL); 36–41 Boston (AL)
Alex Rodriguez	13	1998–2000 Seattle; 01–03 Texas; 04–10 New York (AL)
Al Simmons *	11	1924–32 Philadelphia (AL); 33–34 Chicago (AL)
Miguel Cabrera	11	2004–2007 Florida; 08–14 Detroit
Albert Pujols	10	2001–10 St. Louis (NL)
Albert Belle	9	1992–96 Cleveland; 97–98 Chicago (AL); 99–2000 Baltimore
Rafael Palmeiro	9	1995–98 Baltimore; 99–2003 Texas
Manny Ramirez	9	1998–2000 Cleveland; 01–06 Boston (AL)
Sammy Sosa	9	1995–2003 Chicago (NL)
Chipper Jones *	8	1996–2003 Atlanta Braves
Babe Ruth *	8	1926–33 New York (AL)
Mel Ott *	8	1929–36 New York (NL)
Willie Mays *	8	1959–66 New York—San Francisco
Frank Thomas *	8	1991–98 Chicago (AL)
Mark Teixeira	8	2004–07 Rangers; 07–08 Atlanta Braves; 08 Angels; 09–11 New York

== League leader in runs batted in, five or more seasons ==
Player	Titles	Seasons and teams
Cap Anson *	8	1880–82, 84–86, 88, 91 Chicago (NL)
Josh Gibson *	7	1933–38 Pittsburgh (NNL), 1943 Homestead (NNL)
Willard Brown *	7	1937–39, 41, 43, 47, 48 Kansas City (NAL)
Babe Ruth *	6	1919 Boston (AL); 20–21, 23, 26, 28 (Note: According to the MLB, Ruth and Gehrig were tied for the league lead with 142 in 1928.) New York (AL)
Lou Gehrig *	5	1927–28, 30, 31, 34 New York (AL)
Honus Wagner *	5	1901–02, 08–09, 12 Pittsburgh

=== League leader in runs batted in, three or more consecutive seasons ===
Player	Titles	Seasons and teams
Cap Anson *	3	1880–82 Chicago White Stockings
Cap Anson *	3	1884–86 Chicago White Stockings
Ty Cobb *	3	1907–09 Detroit
Babe Ruth *	3	1919 Boston (AL); 20–21 New York (AL)
Rogers Hornsby *	3	1920–22 St. Louis (NL)
Joe Medwick *	3	1936–38 St. Louis (NL)
George Foster	3	1976–78 Cincinnati
Cecil Fielder	3	1990–92 Detroit

=== League leader in runs batted in, three decades ===
Player	Seasons and teams
Cap Anson *	1880–82, 84–86, 88, 91 Chicago (NL)

=== League leader in runs batted in, both leagues ===
Player	Seasons and teams
Nap Lajoie *	1898 Philadelphia (NL); 1901 Philadelphia (AL); 1904 Cleveland

=== League leader in runs batted in, three different teams ===
Player	Seasons and teams
Nap Lajoie *	1898 Philadelphia (NL); 1901 Philadelphia (AL); 1904 Cleveland

== 10 or more runs batted in by an individual in one game ==
RBIs	Player	Team	Date	Opponent
12	Jim Bottomley *	St. Louis Cardinals	September 16, 1924	Brooklyn Robins
12	Mark Whiten	St. Louis Cardinals	September 7, 1993	Cincinnati Reds
11	Wilbert Robinson *	Baltimore Orioles	June 10, 1882	St. Louis Browns
11	Tony Lazzeri *	New York Yankees	May 24, 1936	Philadelphia Athletics
11	Phil Weintraub	New York Giants	April 30, 1944	Brooklyn Dodgers
10	Rudy York	Boston Red Sox	July 27, 1946	St. Louis Browns
10	Walker Cooper	Cincinnati Reds	July 6, 1949	Chicago Cubs
10	Norm Zauchin	Boston Red Sox	May 27, 1955	Washington Senators
10	Reggie Jackson *	Oakland Athletics	June 14, 1969	Boston Red Sox
10	Fred Lynn **(r)**	Boston Red Sox	June 18, 1975	Detroit Tigers
10	Nomar Garciaparra	Boston Red Sox	May 10, 1999	Seattle Mariners
10	Alex Rodriguez	New York Yankees	April 26, 2005	Los Angeles Angels of Anaheim
10	Garret Anderson	Los Angeles Angels of Anaheim	August 21, 2007	New York Yankees
10	**Anthony Rendon**	Washington Nationals	April 30, 2017	New York Mets
10	Scooter Gennett	Cincinnati Reds	June 6, 2017	St. Louis Cardinals
10	Mark Reynolds	Washington Nationals	July 7, 2018	Miami Marlins
10	**Shohei Ohtani**	Los Angeles Dodgers	September 19, 2024	Miami Marlins

== 950 runs batted in by a team in one season ==
RBI	Team	Season
1,043	Boston Beaneaters	1894
1,007	Philadelphia Phillies	1894
997	New York Yankees	1936
990	New York Yankees	1931
986	New York Yankees	1930
974	Boston Red Sox	1950
960	Cleveland Indians	1999
954	New York Yankees	1932
954	Seattle Mariners	1996

== See also ==
- Major League Baseball's Triple Crown
