= The Real Estate Pros =

- Starring: Richard C. Davis

Original release
- Network: TLC
- Release: April 21, 2007

The Real Estate Pros (originally titled The Real Deal) is a television series that aired on TLC. Each episode follows Richard C. Davis and his crew from Trademark Properties of Charleston, South Carolina as they purchase and renovate a piece of real estate. Most episodes include the listing price of the purchased property, estimated cost of the renovation, and the market value (including potential profit) of the "flipped" property; however, one episode showed Davis renovating a quadplex owned by his company, in order to justify increased rents.

The series premiered on April 21, 2007, titled The Real Deal (directly opposite A&E's third-season premiere of Flip This House). The first episode of The Real Deal was "A Home Run For Trademark", a special centering on the relocation of the Shoeless Joe house, while at the same time helping to renovate the life of a current Major League Baseball player, Josh Hamilton. In June 2007, The Real Deal was renamed The Real Estate Pros.

At a fundraiser event in Charleston, Richard C. Davis, who heads Team Trademark, said he "intends to document the lodge’s rehabilitation as part of the real estate company’s reality series, due to air on TLC in April". The show had a five-year hiatus.

== Crew ==
- Richard C. Davis – Trademark Properties founder
- Ginger Alexander – investments; Richard's protégé
- Dawn Nosal – residential condominiums; Richard's former assistant
- Vance Sudano – real estate agent
- Lori Nolan – residential division leader
- John Davis – commercial property leader; Richard's brother

== See also ==
- Flip This House
