= List of Major League Baseball single-game runs batted in leaders =

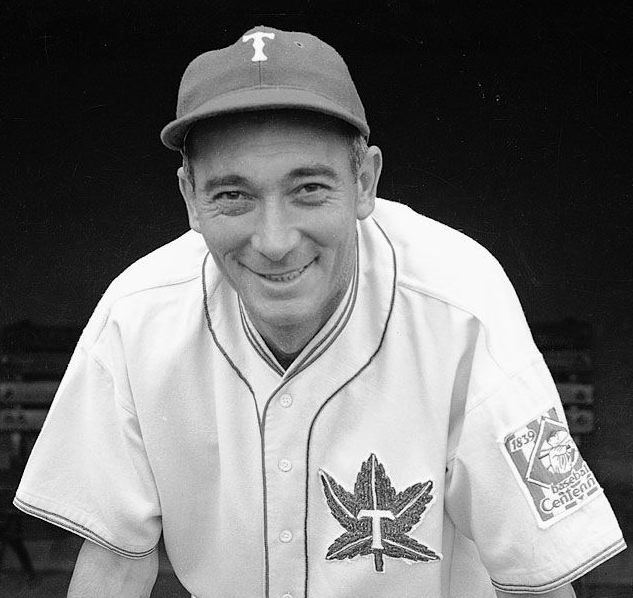
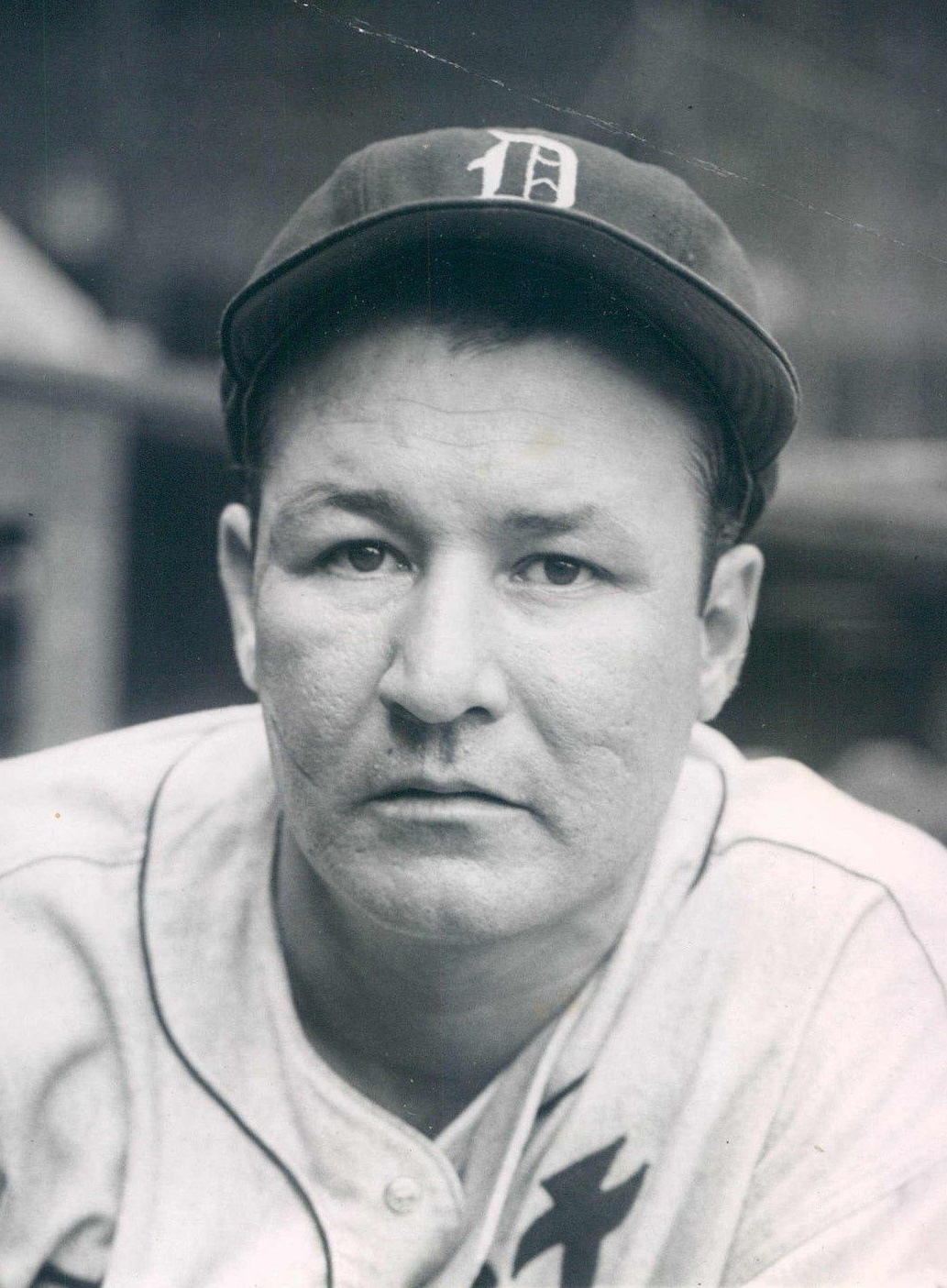
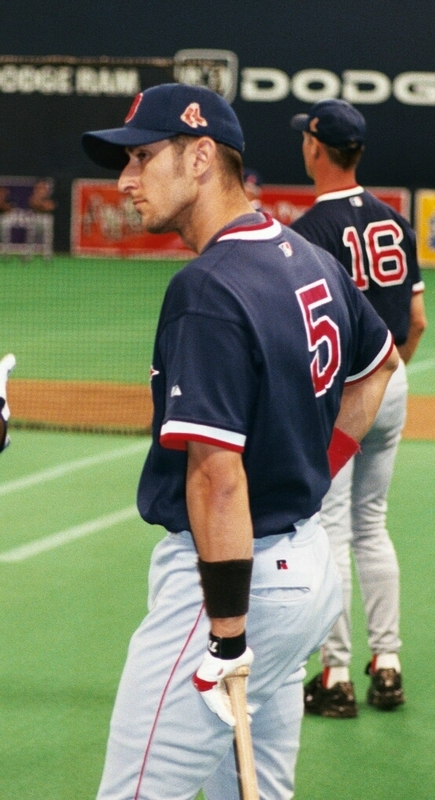
Tony Lazzeri (left), Rudy York (center) and Nomar Garciaparra (right) are the only players to amass 10 runs batted in and hit two grand slams in the same game.

In baseball, a run batted in (RBI) is awarded to a batter for each runner who scores as a result of the batter's action, including a hit, fielder's choice, sacrifice fly, sacrifice bunt, catcher's interference, or a walk or hit by pitch with the bases loaded. A batter is also awarded an RBI for scoring himself upon hitting a home run. Eighteen players have batted in at least 10 runs in a single Major League Baseball (MLB) game to date, the most recent being Ryan O'Hearn of the Pittsburgh Pirates on July 7, 2026. No player has accomplished the feat more than once in his career and no player has ever recorded more than 12 RBIs in a game. Wilbert Robinson was the first player to record at least 10 RBIs in a single game, driving in 11 runs for the Baltimore Orioles against the St. Louis Browns on June 10, 1892.

As of 2026, every team that has had a player achieve the milestone has won the game in which it occurred. These games have resulted in other single-game MLB records being set due to the prodigious offensive performance. Robinson, for example, also amassed seven hits in that same game, setting a new major league record that has since been tied by only one other player. Mark Whiten hit four home runs to complement his 12 RBIs for the St. Louis Cardinals on September 7, 1993, tying the single-game records in both categories. By attaining both milestones, he became one of only two players to hit four home runs and drive in 10 or more runs in the same game, with Scooter Gennett being the other. Tony Lazzeri, Rudy York, and Nomar Garciaparra hit two grand slams during their 10 RBI game, equaling the record for most grand slams in one game. In Ohtani's 10-RBI game, he amassed a combination of single-game offensive statistics that no previous player had accomplished in a career over multiple games, much less a single game—10 RBIs, six hits, five extra-base hits, three home runs, and two stolen bases. He also became the first player with 50 homers and 50 steals in the same season.

Norm Zauchin has the fewest career RBIs among players who have 10 RBIs in one game with 159, while Alex Rodriguez, with 2,086, drove in more runs than any other player in this group and hit the third most in major league history.

Of the eight players eligible for the Baseball Hall of Fame who have batted in 10 runs in a game, three have been elected as players, one of them on the first ballot, and a fourth has been elected as a manager. Players are eligible for Hall of Fame induction in that role if they have played in at least 10 MLB seasons, and have either been retired for five seasons or deceased for at least six months. (Note: Managers are eligible for induction in that role if they have 10 years of MLB managerial service, and have either been retired for five seasons, deceased for six months, or age 65 or older and retired for at least six months.) These requirements leave three players ineligible who are living and have played in the past five seasons and two—Phil Weintraub and Zauchin—who did not play in 10 seasons.

== Players ==
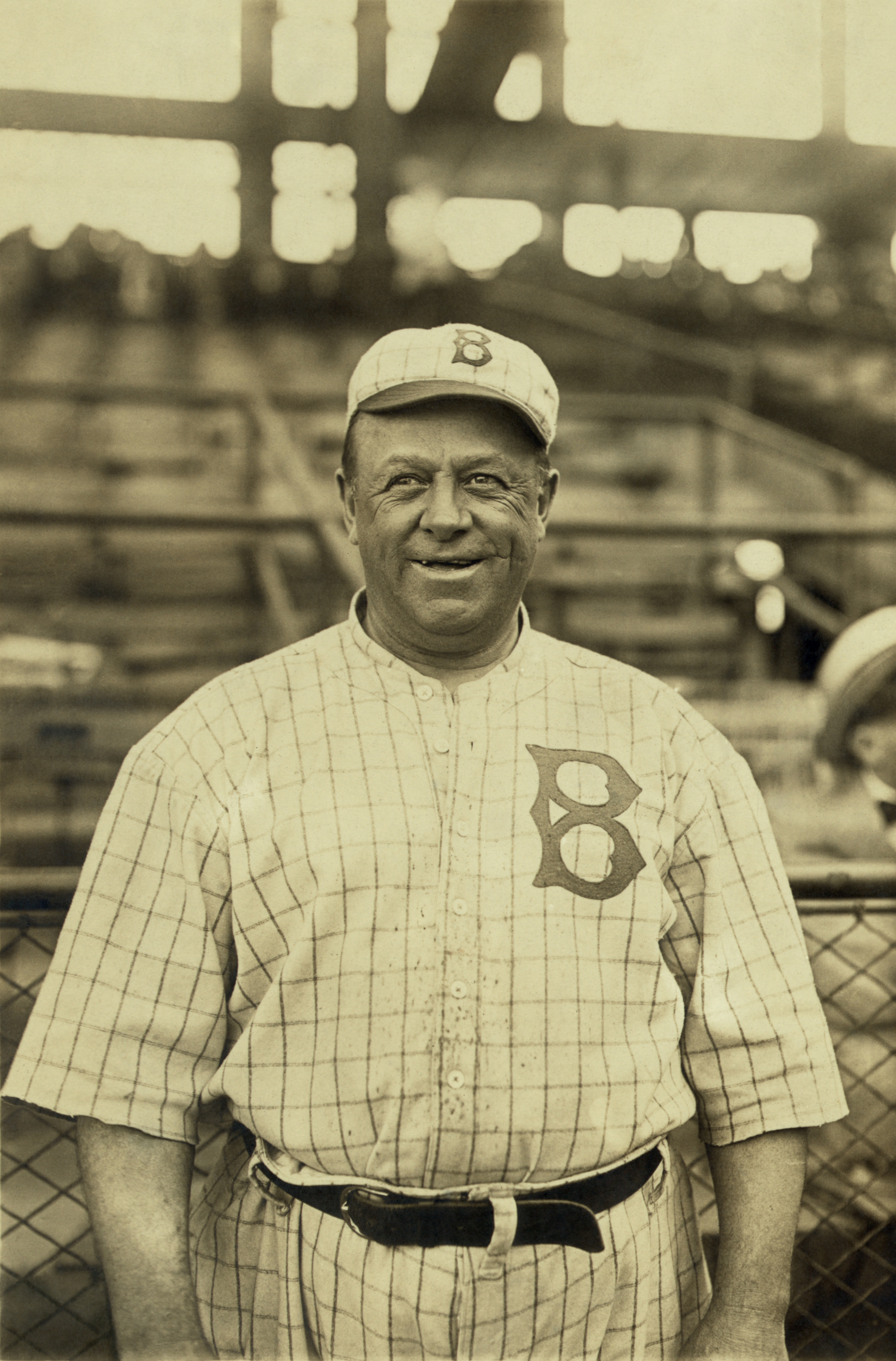
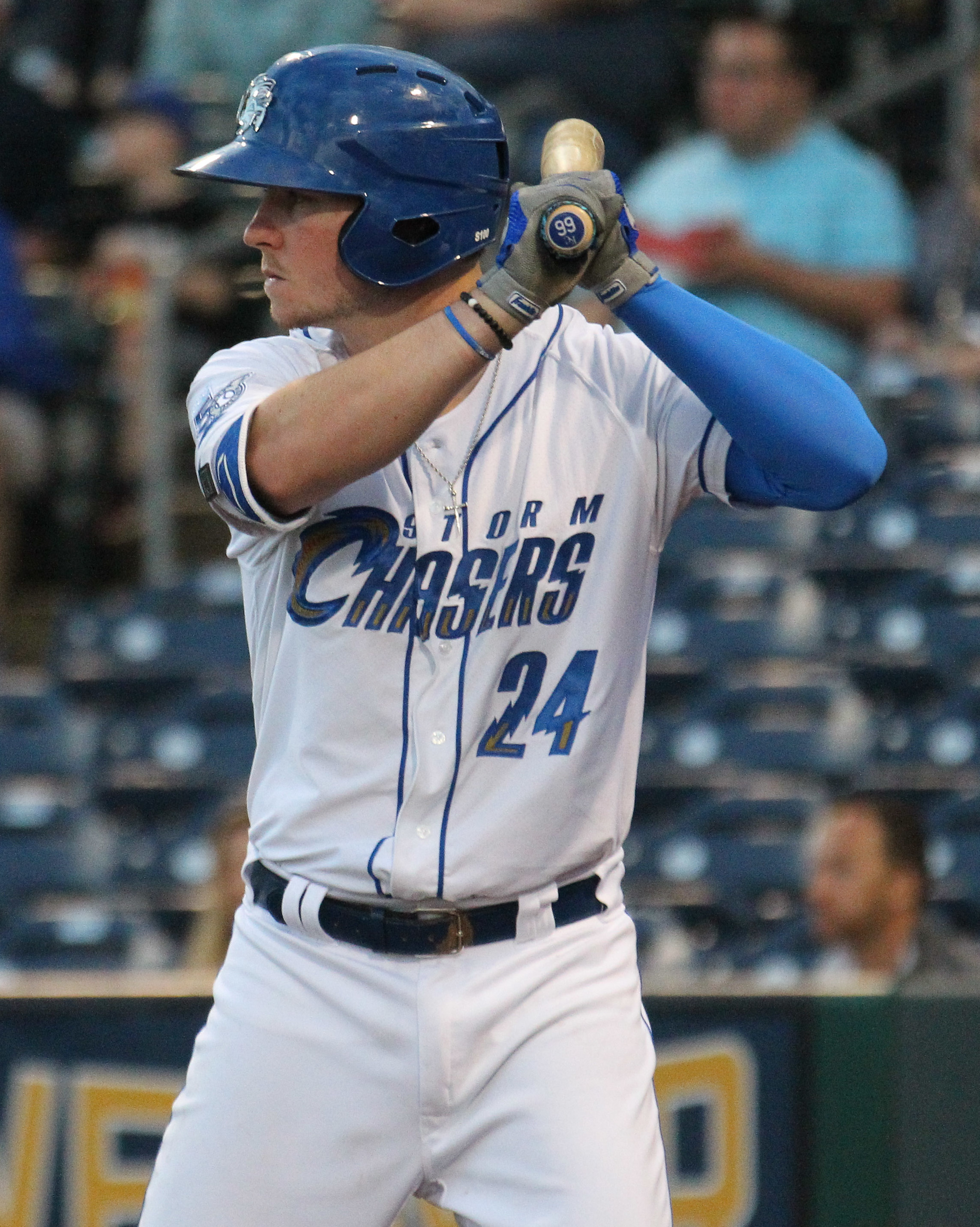
Wilbert Robinson was the first player to have at least 10 RBIs in one game, and Ryan O'Hearn is the most recent player to do so.

Key
Player	Name of the player
Date	Date of the game
Team	The player's team at the time of the game
Opposing team	The team against whom the player hit 10 runs batted in
Score	Final score of the game, with the player's team score listed first
Runs batted in	Number of runs batted in the player hit
Career RBI	The number of runs batted in the player hit in his MLB career
†	Elected to the Baseball Hall of Fame
‡	Player is active

MLB hitters with 10 RBI in one game
#	Player	Date	Team	Opposing team	Score	Runs batted in	Career RBI	Refs
1	Wilbert Robinson^{†} (Note: Inducted to the Hall of Fame as a manager.)	June 10, 1892	Baltimore Orioles	St. Louis Browns	25–4	11	722	
2	Jim Bottomley^{†}	September 16, 1924	St. Louis Cardinals	Brooklyn Robins	17–3	12	1,422	
3	Tony Lazzeri^{†}	May 24, 1936	New York Yankees	Philadelphia Athletics	25–2	11	1,194	
4	Phil Weintraub	April 30, 1944	New York Giants	Brooklyn Dodgers	26–8	11	207	
5	Rudy York	July 27, 1946	Boston Red Sox	St. Louis Browns	13–6	10	1,152	
6	Walker Cooper	July 6, 1949	Cincinnati Reds	Chicago Cubs	23–4	10	812	
7	Norm Zauchin	May 27, 1955	Boston Red Sox	Washington Senators	16–0	10	159	
8	Reggie Jackson^{†}	June 14, 1969	Oakland Athletics	Boston Red Sox	21–7	10	1,702	
9	Fred Lynn	June 18, 1975	Boston Red Sox	Detroit Tigers	15–1	10	1,111	
10	Mark Whiten	September 7, 1993	St. Louis Cardinals	Cincinnati Reds	15–2	12	423	
11	Nomar Garciaparra	May 10, 1999	Boston Red Sox	Seattle Mariners	12–4	10	936	
12	Alex Rodriguez	April 26, 2005	New York Yankees	Los Angeles Angels	12–4	10	2,086	
13	Garret Anderson	August 21, 2007	Los Angeles Angels	New York Yankees	18–9	10	1,365	
14	Anthony Rendon^{‡}	April 30, 2017	Washington Nationals	New York Mets	23–5	10	596	
15	Scooter Gennett	June 6, 2017	Cincinnati Reds	St. Louis Cardinals	13–1	10	349	
16	Mark Reynolds	July 7, 2018	Washington Nationals	Miami Marlins	18–4	10	871	
17	Shohei Ohtani ‡	September 19, 2024	Los Angeles Dodgers	Miami Marlins	20–4	10	704	
18	Ryan O'Hearn ‡	July 7, 2026	Pittsburgh Pirates	Atlanta Braves	12–4	10	374	
