= Richard C. Davis =

American businessman (born 1963)

- Born: August 23, 1963 (age 63)
- Education: Clemson University
- Occupation: Real Estate entrepreneur
- Known for: Founder and CEO of Trademark Properties

Richard C. Davis (born August 23, 1963) is the founder, president and CEO of Trademark Properties, which he founded in 1990, in Charleston, South Carolina, U.S. He and his company specialize in real estate.

== Flip This House ==
Richard C. Davis gained national fame when he appeared on the television show Flip This House, which he created and brought to A&E. The program focuses on the process of buying, remodeling, and selling houses for profit.

Davis and his company won a $4 million federal court verdict against A&E for damages. As a result, Trademark Properties was not involved with the second season of the show.

Davis and his crew signed a deal with TLC network for a new show titled The Real Deal. The series premiered on April 21, 2007 (directly opposite A&E's third-season premiere of Flip This House - New Haven). The first episode of The Real Deal was "A Home Run for Trademark", a special centering on the relocation of the Shoeless Joe Jackson house, while at the same time helping to renovate the life of a current Major League Baseball player Josh Hamilton. In June 2007, The Real Deal was renamed The Real Estate Pros.

== Education ==
Davis graduated from Fort Johnson High School in 1981. He then attended Clemson University, where he was a member of Sigma Nu fraternity, graduating in 1986 with a degree in financial management.
