= Phil Weintraub =

American baseball player (1907–1987)

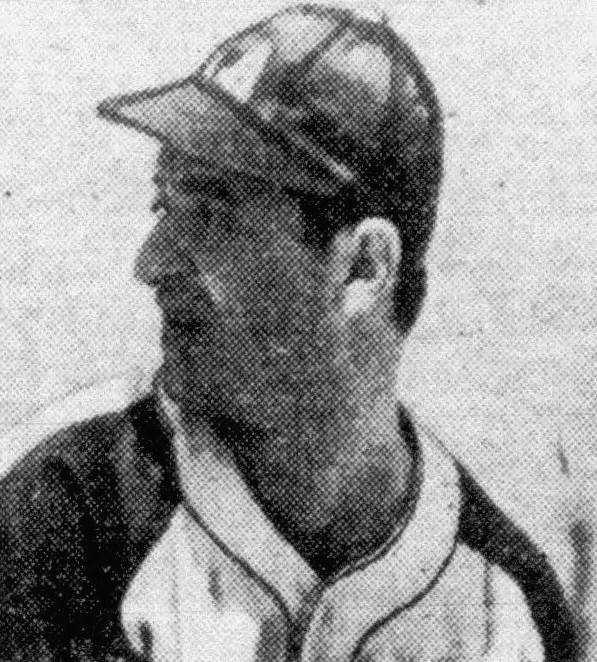
- Weintraub, c. 1942
- First baseman / Outfielder
- Born: October 12, 1907; Chicago, Illinois, U.S.
- Died: June 21, 1987 (aged 79); Palm Springs, California, U.S.
- Batted: Left Threw: Left

MLB debut
- September 5, 1933, for the New York Giants

Last MLB appearance
- August 5, 1945, for the New York Giants

MLB statistics
- Batting average: .295
- Home runs: 32
- Runs batted in: 207
- Stats at Baseball Reference

Teams
- New York Giants (1933–1935); Cincinnati Reds (1937); New York Giants (1937); Philadelphia Phillies (1938); New York Giants (1944–1945)

Philip Weintraub (October 12, 1907 – June 21, 1987) was an American professional baseball first baseman and outfielder.

Weintraub played for 13 minor league teams, for whom he had an aggregate batting average of .337, as well as for the New York Giants, the Cincinnati Reds, and the Philadelphia Phillies in Major League Baseball. He was primarily a reserve outfielder in the majors, though he was platooned at first base in the last few years of his career. He posted a .295 career batting average in the major leagues, and a .398 on-base percentage. In one game in 1944, Weintraub had 11 RBIs, one fewer than the major league record, and he still has as of 2026, the third-most runs batted in (RBIs) in a single game (11, behind Jim Bottomley and Mark Whiten) in Major League history.

Author Joe Cox, writing in The Immaculate Inning: Unassisted Triple Plays, 40/40 Seasons, and the Stories Behind Baseball's Rarest Feats (Rowman & Littlefield, 2018), observed: "The biggest mystery of Weintraub is why a hitter with a career .295 batting average and capable power (.440 slugging percentage) could never get more than 361 at bats in a big league season—or top 1,382 career at bats. ... One biographer cites anti-semitic theories of the time".

Through 2010, Weintraub was fifth all-time in batting average (behind Hank Greenberg, Ryan Braun, Buddy Myer, and Lou Boudreau) among Jewish major league baseball players. With an excellent eye and bat control, he walked 232 times in his career, while striking out only 182 times, for a 1.27 BB/K ratio.

== Early life ==
Weintraub was born in Chicago, Illinois, and was Jewish. He attended Lane Technical College Prep High School. He then played for the Loyola University Chicago baseball team. His father owned a small butcher shop, and wanted him to follow him in the business. His parents, who were from Kiev, in the Russian Empire (now Kyiv, Ukraine), were against him being a baseball player, as they were of the view that all baseball players were "bums." He later lived in Palm Springs, California.

== Minor leagues ==
Weintraub was a heavy hitter in the minors, hitting 194 career home runs.

In 1926 he played for the Rock Island Islanders, in 1927 Weintraub played for the Waco Cubs and the Danville Veterans, and in 1928 he played for the Tyler Trojans. He was a pitcher until he hurt his arm in 1930. He took some time off from baseball after his father died to take over his father's business.

In 1931 Weintraub played for the Dubuque Tigers (had a .372 batting average (3rd in the league) with a .600 slugging percentage (2nd)), in 1932 he played for the Terre Haute Tots (batting .323 with a .500 slugging percentage) and the Dayton Ducks (batting .352 with a .575 slugging percentage), and in 1933 he played for the Birmingham Barons.

In 1934, he batted .401 (the first hitter to bat .400 in the league) with a league-leading .664 slugging percentage for the Nashville Vols of the Southern Association, as Weintraub was second in the league with 16 home runs in 371 at bats.

In 1936 Weintraub played for the Rochester Red Wings of the International League (batting .371 (2nd in the league) while leading the league with a .660 slugging percentage) and the Columbus Red Birds (batting .361 with a .506 slugging percentage). In 1937 he played for the Jersey City Giants, and in 1938 he played for the International League Baltimore Orioles (batting .345 with a .604 slugging percentage). In 1939 and 1940 he played for the Minneapolis Millers in the American Association, batting .331 with 33 home runs (2nd in the league behind Vince DiMaggio) and 126 RBIs, and .347 with 27 home runs and 109 RBIs, with slugging percentages of .633 (2nd in the league) and .600. In 1941 he played for the Los Angeles Angels and batted .302 with 18 home runs (3rd in the league) and a .504 slugging percentage, in 1942 he played for the St. Paul Saints (during the season, he fought a verbally abusive fan in Minneapolis, and "clocked" him) and the Toledo Mud Hens, and in 1943 he again played for Toledo, batting .334 with 16 home runs and 96 RBIs (each 3rd in the league) and a .443 on-base percentage and .507 slugging percentage (both 2nd in the league). In 1945, his last season at the age of 37, he played for the Newark Bears and batted .311.

== Major league career ==
=== New York Giants (1933–1935) ===
His professional debut was on September 5, 1933, for the New York Giants, at 25 years of age. Weintraub played in eight games that season.

In 1934, Weintraub batted .351 with a .461 on-base percentage in 31 games. The Sporting News wrote of him in December 1934: "The Giants don’t know what they’re going to do with Phil."

The following season he batted .241 in 64 games. That year in spring training, despite a team reservation Weintraub and Harry Danning were once refused entry to the Flamingo Hotel in Miami Beach, Florida, which had a "No Jews" policy, but they were allowed to stay when Giants manager Bill Terry threatened he would take the whole team to another hotel if his Jewish ballplayers were not allowed in.

Called "baseball's best-dressed pinch hitter" in 1935 by journalist Fred Lieb, Weintraub reportedly owned 100 suits.

=== St. Louis Cardinals ===
In December 1935 Weintraub was traded by the Giants with pitcher Roy Parmelee and cash to the St. Louis Cardinals for second baseman Burgess "Whitey" Whitehead.

=== Cincinnati Reds (1937) ===
In August 1936 he was purchased by the Cincinnati Reds from the Cardinals. Weintraub batted .271 with a .424 slugging percentage for the Reds in 198 at bats.

=== New York Giants (1937) ===
In July 1937 Weintraub was purchased by the New York Giants from the Reds, and went 3-for-9 with two doubles. Late in November he was sold by the Giants to the Baltimore Orioles of the International League. In 1937, an article in Fortune magazine noted: "Players have changed ... Most clubs today welcome a good Jewish player ... like ... Phil Weintraub."

=== Philadelphia Phillies (1938) ===
In June 1938 he was traded by Baltimore to the Philadelphia Phillies in exchange for first baseman Gene Corbett. In that season Weintraub finished 3rd in the National League in on-base percentage (.422), 9th in batting average (.311), and 10th in walks (64). In contrast, as a team the Phillies batted .254, and only two of its players had more RBIs. For the Phillies, he had the last hit in Philadelphia's Baker Bowl. When a game was scheduled on Yom Kippur, he elected not to play. Late in December 1938 he was purchased by the Boston Red Sox from the Phillies.

Weintraub did not play major league baseball from 1939 through 1943, spending those years in the minor leagues. After Japan attacked Pearl Harbor on December 7, 1941, the 34-year-old Weintraub reported for examination by the draft board, but was declared unfit for military service.

=== New York Giants (1944–1945) ===
In November 1943 he was obtained by the New York Giants from the St. Louis Browns in the Rule 5 draft. In April 1944, in a stunt during a preseason exhibition game Weintraub caught a baseball dropped from a blimp that was 400 feet above him.

In 1944, Weintraub returned to the majors with the Giants after a six-year absence. In 361 at bats he was 5th in the National League in OBP (.412), slugging percentage (.524) and at bats per home run (27.8); 6th in triples (9), 8th in batting average (.316), and 9th in home runs (13).

On April 30, Weintraub had 11 RBIs, setting the franchise record and one short of the major league record, as the Giants defeated the Brooklyn Dodgers, 26–8. He had two doubles, a triple, and a home run. Amazingly, he missed the cycle because he didn't get a single.

In 1945, he batted .272/.389/.417, and on defense Weintraub led the National League in range factor as a first baseman (10.83). Weintraub played his last game on August 5, 1945, at 37 years of age. In January 1946, he was released by the Giants.

=== Career statistics ===
In 444 games over seven seasons, Weintraub posted a .295 batting average (407-for-1382) with 215 runs, 67 doubles, 19 triples, 32 home runs, 207 RBI, 232 bases on balls, .398 on-base percentage and .440 slugging percentage. Defensively, he finished his career with a .990 fielding percentage at first base and .989 fielding percentage overall.

Through 2010, Weintraub was fifth all-time in batting average (behind Hank Greenberg, Ryan Braun, Buddy Myer, and Lou Boudreau) among Jewish major league baseball players.

In 1982, he was inducted into the Chicago Jewish Athletes Hall of Fame.

== After baseball ==
After he retired from playing baseball, in 1946 Weintraub was the Manager of the Bloomingdale Troopers in the North Atlantic League. Newspapers called his team "Weintraub's Troopers." He next worked in the wholesale food business in New York, and then sold real estate in Palm Springs, California.

Weintraub died from a heart attack, after suffering from cancer, on June 21, 1987, in Palm Springs, at the age of 79. He was buried at the Desert Memorial Park in Cathedral City, California.

== See also ==
- List of Jewish Major League Baseball players
