= Scooter Gennett =

American baseball player (born 1990)

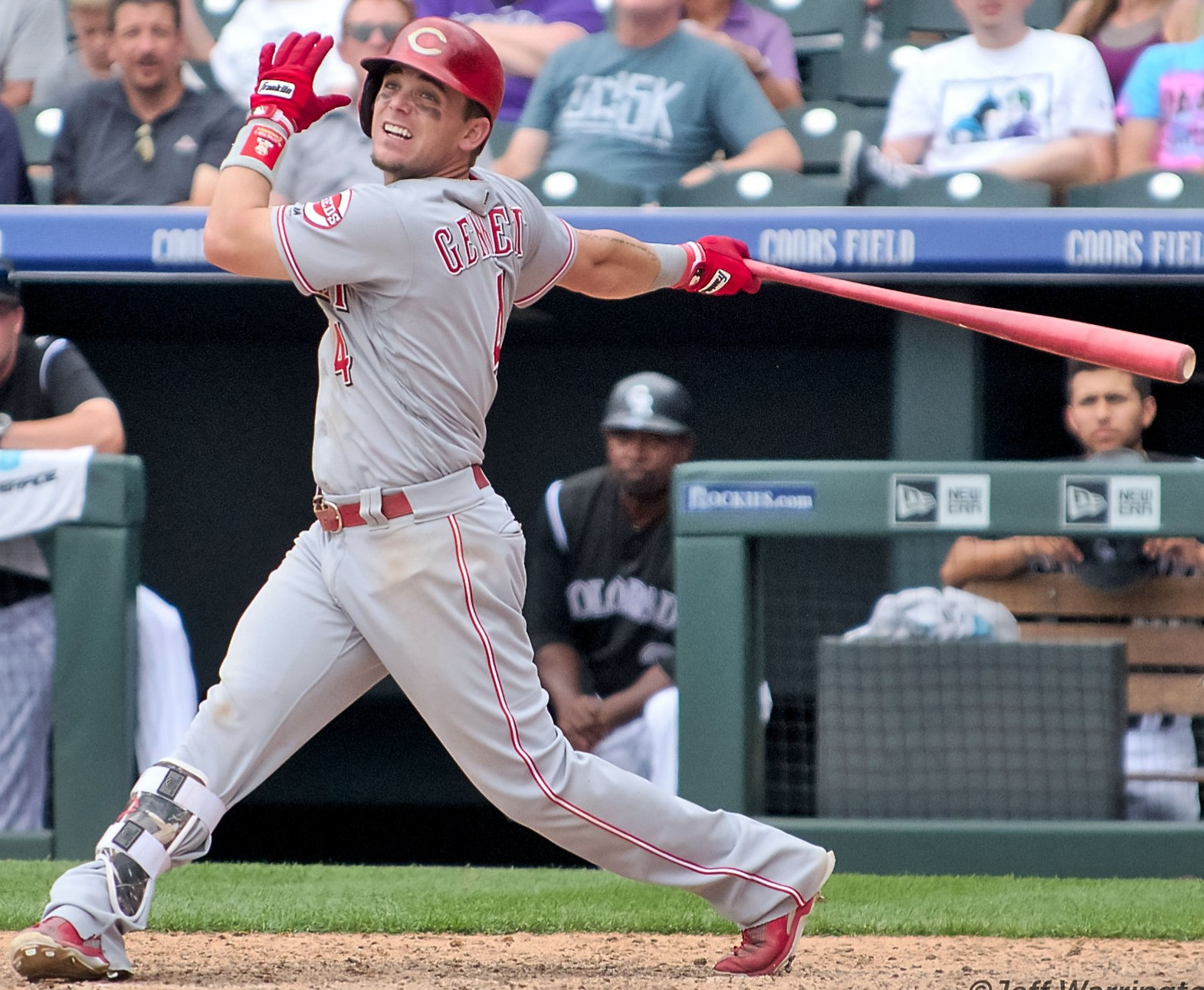
- Gennett with the Cincinnati Reds in 2017
- Second baseman
- Born: May 1, 1990 (age 36); Cincinnati, Ohio, U.S.
- Batted: Left Threw: Right

MLB debut
- June 3, 2013, for the Milwaukee Brewers

Last MLB appearance
- August 26, 2019, for the San Francisco Giants

MLB statistics
- Batting average: .286
- Home runs: 87
- Runs batted in: 360
- Stats at Baseball Reference

Teams
- Milwaukee Brewers (2013–2016); Cincinnati Reds (2017–2019); San Francisco Giants (2019)

Career highlights and awards
- All-Star (2018); Hit four home runs in one game on June 6, 2017

Ryan Joseph "Scooter" Gennett (born May 1, 1990) is an American former professional baseball second baseman. He played in Major League Baseball (MLB) for the Milwaukee Brewers, Cincinnati Reds, and San Francisco Giants. On June 6, 2017, he became the 17th player in major league history to hit four home runs in a single game.

== Early life ==
Gennett was born on May 1, 1990, in Cincinnati, Ohio, and then lived in Lebanon, Ohio until his family moved to Florida when he was nine.

== Professional career ==
=== Draft and minor leagues ===
He was drafted by the Milwaukee Brewers in the 16th round of the 2009 Major League Baseball draft out of Sarasota High School in Sarasota, Florida.

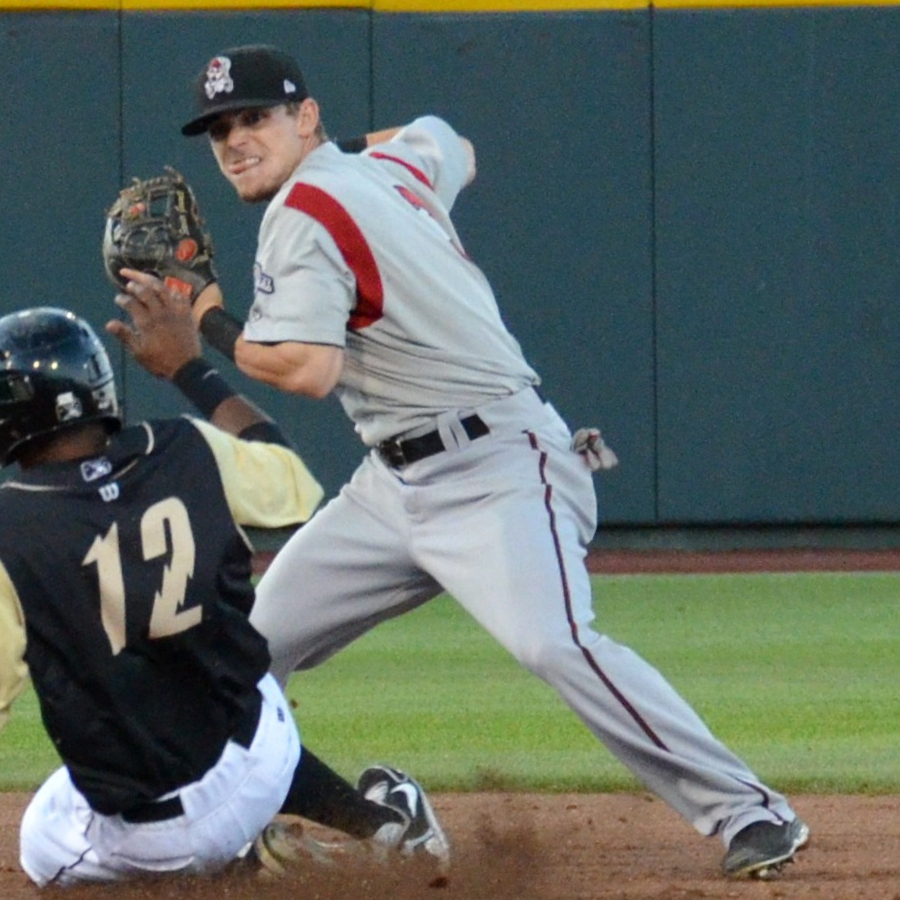
Gennett with the Nashville Sounds in 2013

Gennett represented the Brewers at the 2012 All-Star Futures Game.

=== Milwaukee Brewers (2013–2016) ===
On June 3, 2013, he was recalled from the Nashville Sounds, and made his major league debut against the Oakland Athletics. Gennett collected his first major league hit, a single to right-center, in the bottom of the ninth inning, off of pitcher Jesse Chavez, on June 5. Gennett hit his first major league home run on June 14, against Bronson Arroyo, in his birthplace of Cincinnati.

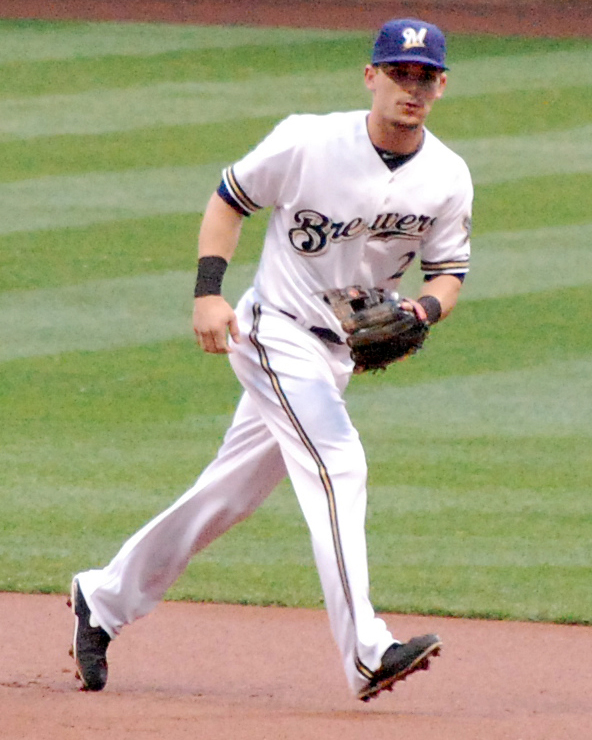
Gennett with the Milwaukee Brewers in 2013

Gennett was the left-handed part of a Milwaukee second base platoon (with Rickie Weeks) in 2014. The platoon ranked fourth in the National League in Wins Above Replacement at the All-Star Break. Gennett did well against right-handed pitching, but keeping with what became problematic for him as he moved up through the minors, he struggled against same-handed opponents with only four hits and one walk in 37 plate appearances versus lefties through the All-Star Break. On June 25, 2014, against the Washington Nationals, Gennett hit his first career grand slam off Stephen Strasburg. He finished the season in the majors.

After Weeks departed, Gennett started for the Brewers for the start of the 2015 season on Opening Day. In the game, he was the Brewers' primary second baseman. He started the season batting below .200 before going on the 15-day disabled list after cutting his hand in the shower. He was sent down to the Colorado Springs Sky Sox, the new Brewers AAA team. After spending about one month in the minors, he was recalled to the majors. Gennett and the Brewers avoided salary arbitration on December 3, 2016, by agreeing to a one-year, $2.525 million contract for 2017.

=== Cincinnati Reds (2017–2019) ===
On March 28, 2017, Gennett was claimed off of waivers by the Cincinnati Reds. On April 3, 2017, Gennett hit a two-out, two-run home run in the bottom of the ninth on Opening Day against the Philadelphia Phillies. On June 6, 2017, Gennett hit a record-tying four home runs (including a grand slam) and had a career-high 10 RBI against the St. Louis Cardinals. He is the 17th player in MLB history and first in Reds history to hit four home runs in a game, and the seventh to hit home runs in four consecutive at bats in the same game. In the same game, he set a club record with 17 total bases. On August 14, 2017, Gennett hit his 20th home run of the season and pitched one inning. He became the second player in MLB history to hit their 20th home run of the season in the same game they pitched in (after Babe Ruth). For the season, Gennett established his best career offensive season, hitting 27 home runs along with 97 RBIs and a .295 batting average.

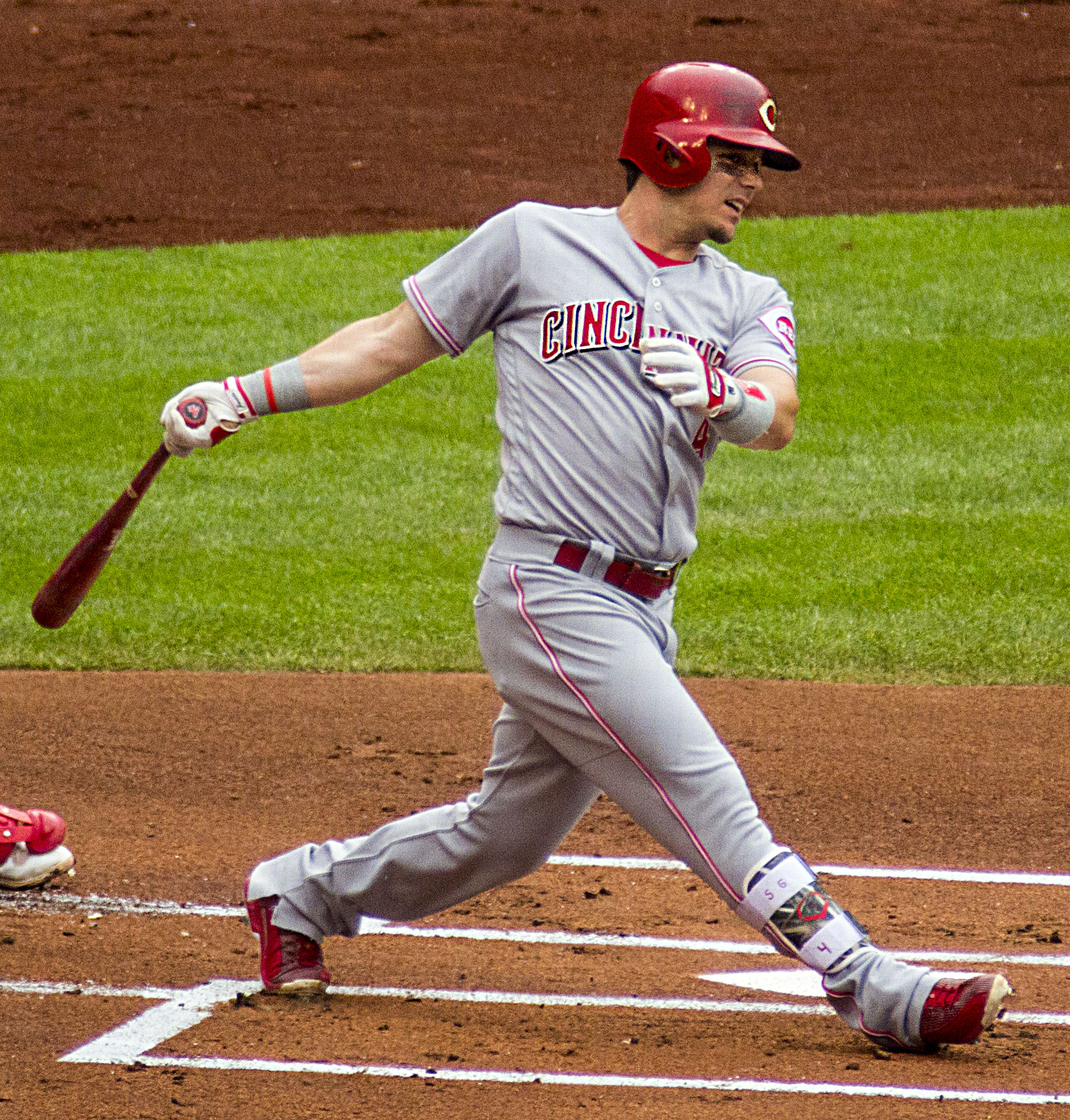
Gennett batting for Cincinnati in 2017

Batting .326 with 14 home runs and 58 RBIs, Gennett was named to the 2018 Major League Baseball All-Star Game. In the bottom of the ninth inning, Gennett hit a game-tying 2-run home run off Edwin Díaz, but the N.L. lost to the A.L. 8–6. He finished the season with 23 home runs, 92 RBIs, and a .310 average that ranked second in the National League.

Gennett's strong seasons with the Reds led to a one-year, $9.78 million deal with the team, but he began the 2019 campaign on the injured list with a severely strained groin. Upon coming back, he only hit .217 with no home runs and five RBIs in 22 games.

=== San Francisco Giants (2019) ===
On July 31, 2019, Gennett was traded to the San Francisco Giants for a player to be named later. Gennett's arrival preceded the Giants' decision to let go of long-time second baseman Joe Panik, who was designated for assignment on August 6.

Gennett struggled with the Giants, hitting .234 with two home runs and six RBI in 21 games, to go along with 21 strikeouts in 64 at-bats. On August 27, 2019, the Giants released Gennett, less than a month after acquiring him. He ultimately did not play for any team during the COVID-19 pandemic-shortened 2020 season.

== Personal life ==
Gennett gained his nickname Scooter from the character "Scooter" on the show Muppet Babies after a childhood incident with the police. As a kid, he would constantly remove his seat-belt while traveling in the car, angering his mother. His mother took Scooter to a police station to attempt to scare him into keeping the seat-belt on. When the policeman asked Gennett his name, he replied "Scooter"; his mother asked him, "Where did you come up with that?" He replied, "The Muppets", and has gone by that name ever since.

In 2017, Gennett was nominated for the Roberto Clemente Award for his efforts with the Athletes Brand charity campaign titled "K Poverty." Athletes Brand and Food for the Hungry partnered with Major League Baseball Players to help mitigate poverty in the Dominican Republic.

Gennett grew up a Reds fan.

Gennett and his wife, Kelsey, were married during the 2015 season in Milwaukee. They reside in Parrish, Florida.

== See also ==
- List of Major League Baseball single-game home run leaders
- List of Major League Baseball single-game runs batted in leaders

Achievements
Preceded by Josh Hamilton	Batters with four home runs in one game June 6, 2017	Succeeded by J. D. Martinez
