= Flip This House =

American television series

- Country of origin: United States
- No. of seasons: 5

Production
- Running time: 42 minutes

Original release
- Network: A&E
- Release: July 24, 2005 – August 15, 2009

Flip This House is an American television series that aired on the A&E and Bio television networks from 2005 to 2009. Each episode spotlighted the purchase and renovation of a single unit. All episodes included listing the price of the purchase, the cost of renovation, and the market value (including potential profit) of the "flipped" property.

== Series overview ==
| Season | Episodes | Premiere | Finale |
|---|---|---|---|
| 1 | 13 | July 24, 2005 | March 3, 2006 |
| 2 | 11 | July 23, 2006 | November 12, 2006 |
| 3 | 19 | March 31, 2007 | October 6, 2007 |
| 4 | 23 | March 15, 2008 | November 15, 2008 |
| 5 | 12 | July 11, 2009 | August 15, 2009 |

=== Season one (2005-2006) ===
In season one, the series followed the activities surrounding the Charleston, South Carolina-based Trademark Properties, founded by Richard C. Davis.

Charleston Team

- Richard C. Davis – Founder and head of the company.
- Ginger Alexander – Davis' right-hand associate who assists with the flipping of houses
- Dawn Nosal – Project coordinator
- Kevin Molony – Head of construction during the flipping process
- Vance Sudano – One of the real estate brokers who sells the finished houses

Due to a contractual disagreement Trademark decided not to return for season two of the show. Davis created the show in 2003, took it to A&E to partner, and claims that he has yet to receive any payment. In July 2006, Trademark Properties filed a lawsuit against A&E alleging breach of contract and fraud. Davis was awarded $4 million by the jury in the case, an amount equal to more than half of the profit generated by the first season of the show. The A&E network responded through its spokesman, Michael Feeney, by saying, "We are deeply disappointed in the jury's decision, and we will follow the appropriate steps to have the verdict reversed."

Davis signed a series deal with TLC, and the new series, originally titled The Real Deal and now named The Real Estate Pros, began airing April 21, 2007.

=== Season two (2006) ===
In season two, the show was recast with a team from San Antonio, and another from Atlanta.

San Antonio Team

- Armando Montelongo – Montelongo House Buyers co-founder, David's brother
- Veronica Montelongo – Armando's wife, the company's sales executive
- David Montelongo – Co-Founder
- Melina Montelongo – David's wife, who is the company Marketing Director

Atlanta Team

- Sam Leccima – Founder of Leccima Real Estate, accused of fraud in May 2007.
- Shanni Leccima – Sam's wife and partner
- Lamont Martin – Sam's right-hand man and construction manager
- Angela Wilford – Works for Keller-Williams Realty and collaborates with the Leccimas to sell the flipped houses.

In May 2007, television station WAGA in Atlanta exposed the Season Two episodes starring local developer Sam Leccima to be staged and fraudulent. This same report also revealed that Leccima has been the subject of numerous legal actions stemming from fraudulent real estate solicitations, some of which were related to his activity on the show. A&E has denied any knowledge of Leccima's activities and has stopped producing episodes. These episodes are no longer aired.

=== Season three (2007) ===
In season three, a new team from New Haven, Connecticut was introduced. Additionally, the team from Atlanta recast with a new group of people. Only the Montelongo team from San Antonio continued their roles from the prior season.

New Haven Team

- Than Merrill
- Paul Esajian
- JD Esajian
- Jeremy Black
- Lori Parks

Atlanta Team

Note: the Atlanta cast has changed since last season.

- Angela Wilford
- Harris Wilford
- Scott Tremmel
- Danielle Anderson
- Peter Pasternack
- Brian Trow

San Antonio Team

- Armando Montelongo – Founder of Armando Montelongo Companies
- Veronica Montelongo – Armando's wife, who sells houses and is also V.P. of Armando Montelongo Comp.
- Randy Burch – Contractor who works on the houses
- Christopher Mendoza – Armando Montelongo Companies intern
- David Montelongo – Co-Founder of Armando Montelongo Companies
- Melina Montelongo – David's wife, who is the company Marketing Director

=== Season four (2008) ===
In season four, a new team from Los Angeles was introduced. Additionally, the team from Atlanta was recast again keeping only Brian Trow and Peter Pasternack from Season 3.

New Haven Team

- Than Merrill
- Paul Esajian
- JD Esajian
- Jeremy Black
- Lori Parks

Atlanta Team

Note: the Atlanta cast has changed since last season.

- Peter Pasternack
- Brian Trow
- Candice Posey

San Antonio Team

- Armando Montelongo – Founder & CEO of Armando Montelongo Companies
- Veronica Montelongo – Armando's wife, who sells houses and is also V.P. of Armando Montelongo Companies
- Randy Burch – Contractor who works on the houses
- Brent Holt – Project Manager

Los Angeles Team

- Rudy Martinez
- Carlos Vazquez
- Mary O'Grady

=== Season five (2009) ===
For the show's final season, the producers opted to keep the New Haven, Atlanta, San Antonio, and Los Angeles teams the same as the fourth season.

New Haven Team

- Than Merrill
- Paul Esajian
- JD Esajian
- Cindy Phillips

Atlanta Team

- Peter Pasternack
- Brian Trow
- Candice Posey

San Antonio Team

- Randy Burch – Contractor who works on the houses
- Brent Holt

Los Angeles Team

- Rudy Martinez
- Carlos Vazquez
- Mary O'Grady

== Controversy ==
=== Season one ===
In 2007, Flip This House was the subject of a breach of contract and fraud lawsuit brought by Trademark Properties, a South Carolina real estate company that starred in the show's first season.

In the several million dollar civil lawsuit, Flip This House's original executive producer and star, Richard C. Davis, charged A&E and the show's Departure Films production company with breach of contract, fraud, and seven other charges. In the lawsuit Davis claimed to have not received any financial compensation from A&E or Departure for Flip This House's first season and alleged that they had actually created the show themselves, but they called it Worst To First. He claimed that he pitched the show to A&E, which later agreed to produce and televise 13 episodes of the series. Davis alleged that A&E agreed that although A&E would pay all the show's production costs, the parties would be 50/50 partners in any profits generated from the project and agreed to prepare a written agreement stating such. Instead, according to Davis, A&E aired the program, using his likeness without his permission, and changing the name of the show from Worst to First to Flip This House so as not to arouse suspicion that they were going to use the show concept and had no intention of ever paying Davis for the use of his show title and show concept.

According to Davis, the network allegedly never provided an agreement that reflected the terms of their alleged verbal agreement throughout the entire period of Flip This House's first-season production. According to Davis, "A&E defrauded and misappropriated and stole the project for A&E's own use and benefit, and merely changed the name so as not to have to pay for the show concept." Allegedly it wasn't until around March 2006 that Davis learned that A&E had decided to produce and air another season of Flip this House without using his services (which he would not have agreed to anyway, since he was never paid for the first season).

A&E claimed that they provided Davis with "powerful" free advertising for his company, "Trademark". A&E also alleged that it only moved forward with a second season after Davis announced that he was launching a new reality show with the TLC cable television network.

The case was resolved by a jury and Davis was awarded $4 million, an amount equal to half of the profits from the first season of Flip This House. A&E has promised to appeal the decision. The Real Estate Pros, first aired under the title The Real Deal, starring Davis and the rest of his staff at Trademark Properties premiered on TLC cable television network on April 21, 2007. From June 2008, The Real Estate Pros was on hiatus and was not airing. As of January 2009, new episodes of Real Estate Pros were in production, but have never been aired as of November 2009.

=== Season two ===
Sam Leccima is an Atlanta businessman who served as one of the show's second season stars. His "Leccima Real Estate Company" was one of two real estate firms that the show's second season followed.

According to a two-part television news report broadcast by Atlanta's Fox affiliate WAGA-TV in May 2007, Mr. Leccima didn't own the houses he claimed to have sold on Flip This House and also staged some of the renovations depicted on the show (ceiling panels were later seen falling, which was blamed on the inferior work of a sub-contractor in the TV series).

WAGA also reported that Mr. Leccima didn't possess a real estate license when Flip This House was filming prior to the series's second-season premiere, claiming that Mr. Leccima "does not bear a good reputation for honesty, trustworthiness, integrity, and competence."

According to WAGA, he even staged at least one fake open house in which some of his friends posed as buyers for the home. In addition, he even claimed to sell another home that he didn't own.

A&E announced that it was pulling Leccima's Flip This House episodes off its broadcast schedule and denied any knowledge or part in the frauds shown on their network.

From A&E's Claim to Not Know Anything About All of the Fraud on the A&E web site on July 1, 2007: "We are dismayed to learn of these allegations. A&E Television Networks is not a party to any of the transactions shown in Flip This House and has not received any formal complaints about the properties or sales. Based on these allegations, A&E is taking all episodes featuring Mr. Leccima off the air pending further investigation of the claims. After the second season of Flip This House, A&E decided to change direction and focus on different cast members, as we did after the first season when another controversial situation happened, and we no longer work with Mr. Leccima or Trademark Properties."

Mr. Leccima has suggested that A&E and Flip This House's production company knew what was going on. "Ask anybody who works in television how a reality show is made and you'll find that ours was a very typical approach", Leccima told The AP.
