= Armando Montelongo =

American businessman and public speaker

- Armando Montelongo in November 2012
- Occupations: Chief Executive Officer, Armando Montelongo Companies
- Known for: A&E's Flip This House
- Website: armandomontelongo.com

Armando Montelongo Jr. is an American real estate entrepreneur and public speaker, best known for his role from 2006 to 2009 on the A&E reality TV show Flip This House. He is the founder of "Armando Montelongo Companies", which presents real estate investment seminars. Montelongo continues investing in real estate while operating his seminar company.

== Career ==
=== Entertainment ===
After the first season of Flip This House cast, the second season was recast with two teams Montelongo's team from San Antonio and another competitor from Atlanta. Along with his then-wife Veronica, Brent Holt, and Randy Burch they were known as the San Antonio Team on the A&E show. He was on the show for three seasons.

In 2011, Montelongo formed a film production company, "Armando Montelongo Productions", to produce a feature film called Line of Duty. Described as an "urban crime drama", the movie was set and filmed in San Antonio. Line of Duty was written and directed by San Antonio native Bryan Ramirez, and featured Jeremy Ray Valdez, Will Rothhaar, Walter Perez, Joseph Julian Soria, Will Estes, Vivica A. Fox, Fernanda Romero and Jesse Borrego. Montelongo served as the film's executive producer. The estimated $2.5 million-budget film premiered in February 2013, with theatrical release in September and DVD release slated for December 2013.

=== Awards ===
In August 2011, Montelongo was ranked as the No. 2 Hispanic business owner on Inc. 500.

=== Other businesses ===
Montelongo moved back to his hometown of San Antonio, Texas, from California in 2001 and launched a career as a real estate investor. He began offering real estate seminars in 2005 and started Armando Montelongo Seminars in 2008. The company's seminars include information on the company's $1,500 three-day workshop as well as for a $25,000 in-person training workshop with Armando Montelongo.

In 2011 the seminar company was investigated by the Texas attorney general. Montelongo settled the case with no admission of wrongdoing, and signed an "Assurance of Voluntary Compliance" outlining 20 conditions that must be met to continue marketing the seminars, including refraining from any false claims and stating that the seminars are primarily a vehicle to sell goods and services.

In May 2010, Montelongo sponsored an Indy 500 race car with Conquest Racing. The driver, Mario Romancini, finished 13th. One year later, he sponsored another car with Conquest Racing, driven by Pippa Mann.

On February 6, 2015, Montelongo was featured on Undercover Boss in which he disguised himself as an electrician, a seminar student, and a call center employee "to see what keeps his real estate investment company on solid ground" and make sure nothing untoward is going on.
