= Josh Hamilton =

American baseball player (born 1981)

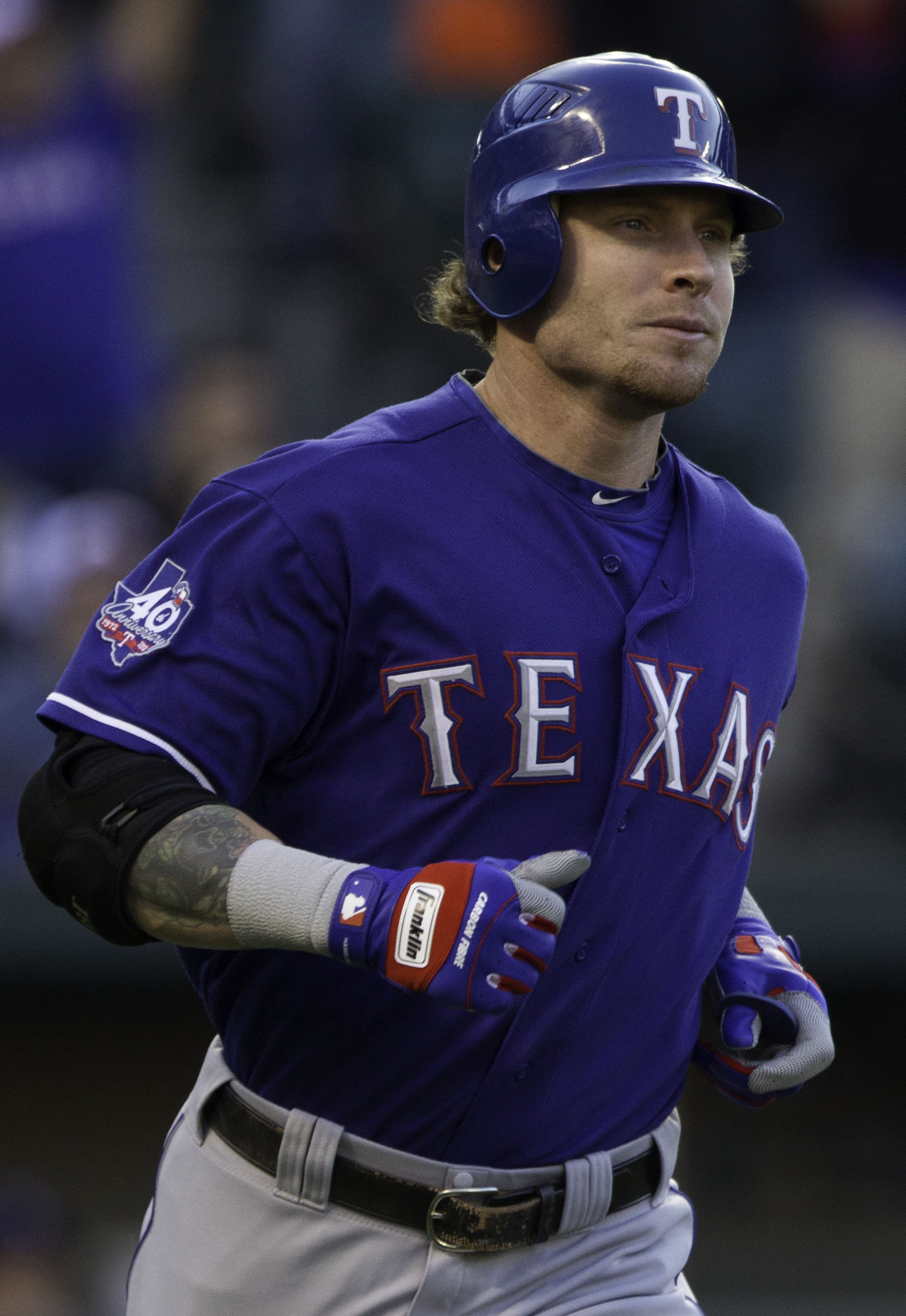
- Hamilton with the Texas Rangers in 2012
- Outfielder
- Born: May 21, 1981 (age 45); Raleigh, North Carolina, U.S.
- Batted: Left Threw: Left

MLB debut
- April 2, 2007, for the Cincinnati Reds

Last MLB appearance
- October 4, 2015, for the Texas Rangers

MLB statistics
- Batting average: .290
- Home runs: 200
- Runs batted in: 701
- Stats at Baseball Reference

Teams
- Cincinnati Reds (2007); Texas Rangers (2008–2012); Los Angeles Angels of Anaheim (2013–2014); Texas Rangers (2015)

Career highlights and awards
- 5× All-Star (2008–2012); AL MVP (2010); ALCS MVP (2010); 3× Silver Slugger Award (2008, 2010, 2012); AL batting champion (2010); AL RBI leader (2008); Hit four home runs in one game on May 8, 2012; Texas Rangers Hall of Fame

Joshua Holt Hamilton (born May 21, 1981) is an American former professional baseball player. He played in Major League Baseball (MLB) as an outfielder from 2007 to 2015, most prominently as a member of the Texas Rangers teams that won consecutive American League pennants in 2010 and 2011. A five-time All-Star, Hamilton won three Silver Slugger Awards and was named the American League (AL) Most Valuable Player (MVP) in 2010. He also won an AL batting championship along with an AL RBI title. During his major league tenure, he also played for the Cincinnati Reds and the Los Angeles Angels of Anaheim.

Hamilton was chosen by the Tampa Bay Devil Rays with the first overall pick in the 1999 MLB draft. He was considered a blue chip prospect until injuries sustained in a 2001 car accident and a drug addiction derailed his career. Prior to the 2007 season, Hamilton was selected by the Chicago Cubs in the Rule 5 draft; the Cubs traded him to the Cincinnati Reds, where he made his MLB debut in 2007. Before the 2008 season, he was traded to the Texas Rangers, where he had a breakout season in 2008 and helped the team reach the World Series in 2010 and 2011. In 2012, Hamilton received more fan votes than any other player in the history of the All-Star Game. On May 8, 2012, Hamilton became the 16th player in MLB history to hit four home runs in a game; on that date, he also set an AL record for total bases in a game with 18. Hamilton was inducted into the Texas Rangers Hall of Fame in 2019.

Hamilton signed with the Los Angeles Angels in 2012, but his tenure with the team was marred by injuries, performance issues, and a drug relapse. The Angels traded Hamilton back to the Rangers in 2015, and he played one more season for the Rangers before injuries ended his career.

In 2019, Hamilton was charged with a felony for allegedly abusing his daughter. On February 22, 2022, Hamilton pleaded guilty to unlawful restraint.

== Early life ==
Joshua Holt Hamilton was born on May 21, 1981, in Raleigh, North Carolina, to Tony and Linda Hamilton. Of majority Scottish heritage, Hamilton was raised in Raleigh, playing Little League Baseball alongside former South Carolina and Oakland Athletics catcher Landon Powell. Hamilton attended Athens Drive High School in Raleigh where he starred as both a pitcher and outfielder. As a high school senior, Hamilton ran the 60-yard dash in 6.7 seconds and was clocked at 97 miles per hour (156 km/h) on the mound. After hitting .529 in 25 games with 13 home runs, 20 stolen bases, 35 runs batted in (RBIs), and 34 runs scored, Hamilton was widely considered one of the top two prospects for the 1999 MLB draft, along with Josh Beckett, a Texas high school athlete. Hamilton initially signed a letter of intent to play college baseball for North Carolina State.

== Professional career ==
=== Draft and minor leagues ===
The Tampa Bay Devil Rays owned the number one pick in the 1999 MLB draft and used it to select Hamilton. The Devil Rays viewed Hamilton as a can't-miss prospect. Hamilton signed with Tampa Bay, receiving a $3.96 million signing bonus, and joined their minor league system. His first stop in the minor leagues was the rookie-level Princeton Devil Rays of the Appalachian League, where he played 56 games. Hamilton later joined the Short Season Single-A club, the Hudson Valley Renegades, and helped lead them to their first New York–Penn League championship. He spent the 2000 season with the Charleston RiverDogs in the South Atlantic League. Hamilton hit .301 in 96 games, with 13 home runs and 61 RBIs. He was also selected to the South Atlantic League All Star game and took home MVP honors after going 2–6 with two triples and two runs scored. In addition, Hamilton was named to the 2000 All-Star Futures Game, a game designed to showcase minor league prospects. Hamilton was also voted Minor League Player of the Year by USA Today.

At the beginning of his professional career, Hamilton's parents quit their jobs and began following their son on the road. However, in February 2001, Hamilton and his mother were injured in a car accident. His mother returned home and Hamilton, with an injured back, found himself unable to play baseball, flush with cash and unsupervised by his parents for the first time. At age 20, he had his first drink of alcohol. He began spending his idle time at a tattoo shop drinking and using drugs. Later that year he also made his first attempt at rehabilitation. Hamilton only played 45 games in the 2001 season, split between the Charleston (Single-A) and the Orlando Rays, a Double-A team in the Southern League. Hamilton began the 2002 season with the Bakersfield Blaze, batting .303 with nine home runs and 44 RBIs in 56 games before his season came to an end due to lingering toe and neck injuries.

During spring training of the 2003 season, Hamilton failed his first drug test. At the start of the season, Hamilton showed up late several times during spring training and was reassigned to the team's minor league camp. He left the team and resurfaced several times, but eventually took the rest of the season off for personal reasons. Hamilton was hoping to return to spring training with the Devil Rays in 2004, though was suspended 30 days and fined for violating the drug policy put in place by MLB. A "failed" test is one in which there is a positive result for a drug more severe than marijuana. A month later, MLB suspended him for the entire season after he failed two more tests.

Hamilton was out of baseball for almost three years. He made several attempts at rehabilitation, and started off the 2005 season with hopes of being a star major league outfielder. However, he was arrested before the season for smashing the windshield of a friend's truck. The Rays placed Hamilton on the restricted list, moving him off the 40-man roster. After another relapse, MLB suspended him for the entire 2006 season.

Hamilton's return to baseball was helped along by former minor league outfielder and manager Roy Silver, who owned a baseball academy in Florida. After hearing about Hamilton's desire to return to baseball, Silver offered the use of his facility if Hamilton agreed to work there. After several months there, Hamilton attempted to play with an independent minor league team, but MLB stepped in and disallowed it.

Hamilton was allowed to work out with the Devil Rays' minor league players starting on June 2, 2006. By the end of the month, he was allowed to participate in minor league games. In order for this to happen, the Rays had to run Hamilton through waivers, making him available for any team for $20,000. No team put a claim in for him. Hamilton played in 15 games with the Hudson Valley Renegades at the end of the 2006 season, his second stint with the minor league ball club.

=== Rule 5 draft ===
Left off the Rays' 40-man roster, Hamilton was selected third overall in the 2006 Rule 5 draft by the Chicago Cubs, who immediately traded him to the Reds for $100,000 ($50,000 for his rights, and $50,000 to cover the cost of the Rule 5 selection). In their coverage of the draft, Chris Kline and John Manuel of Baseball America called Hamilton "the biggest name in the Rule 5 in many years".

=== Cincinnati Reds (2007) ===
Hamilton was one of the Reds' best hitters in spring training in 2007, leaving camp with a .403 batting average. In order to retain the rights to Hamilton, though, the Reds would have to keep him on their Major League 25-man roster for the entire 2007 season, so they planned to use him as a fourth outfielder.

Hamilton made his Major League debut at the age of 26 on April 2 against the Chicago Cubs in a pinch-hit appearance, receiving a 22-second standing ovation. As he was waiting to bat, Cubs catcher Michael Barrett said, "You deserve it, Josh. Take it all in, brother. I'm happy for you." After he lined out, Hamilton stayed in the game to play left field. He made his first start on April 10 against the Arizona Diamondbacks, batting leadoff. In that game, he recorded his first Major League hit, a home run off Édgar González. The next night, he hit another. Hamilton was named the National League Rookie of the Month for April.

On May 22, the Reds placed Hamilton on the 15-day disabled list with gastroenteritis; they activated him on June 5 after he batted .333 (8-for-24) with four home runs and six RBIs in a six-game Minor League rehabilitation assignment. Hamilton went back on the DL on July 12 with a sprained wrist.

Hamilton ended up starting most of the season in center field after an injury to Ryan Freel, but was shut out in the voting for the Rookie of the Year, which was won by Ryan Braun. For the 2007 season, he hit .292 with 19 home runs and 47 runs batted in in 90 games.

On December 21, 2007, the Reds traded Hamilton to the Texas Rangers for Edinson Vólquez and Danny Herrera.

=== Texas Rangers (2008–2012) ===
==== 2008 ====
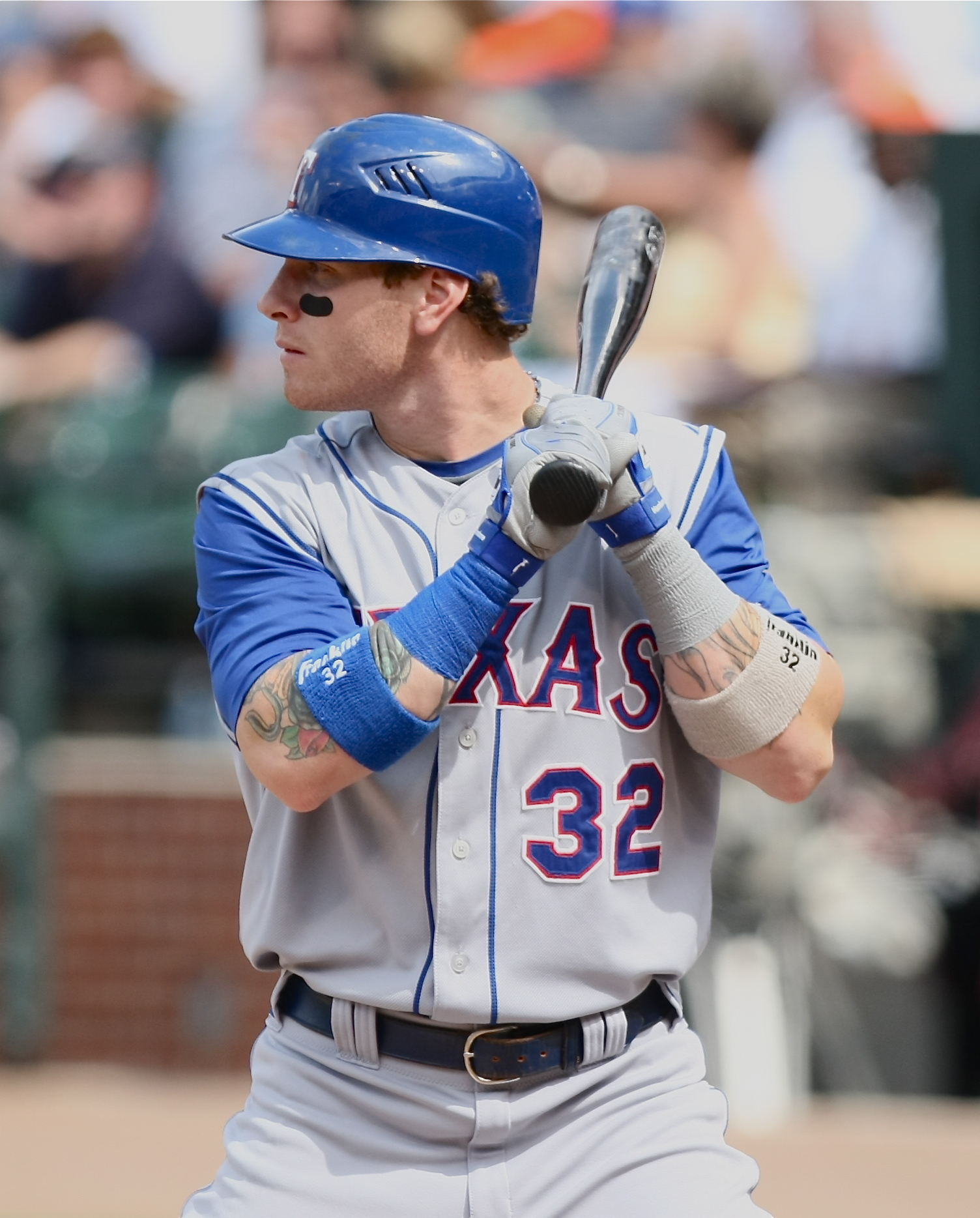
Hamilton in 2008

The 2008 season was a breakout season for Hamilton. He locked up the Rangers' starting center fielder job with a stellar spring training. His spring training performance continued into the regular season. Hamilton, usually slotted fourth in the Texas batting order, led all major league players in RBIs for the month of April. He was named AL Player of the Month after hitting .330 with 32 RBIs during the month. Hamilton then went on to win player of the month for the second straight month in May, becoming the first AL player in baseball history to be awarded Player of the Month for the first two months of the season. Hamilton was featured on the cover of the June 2, 2008, issue of Sports Illustrated, in a story chronicling his comeback. On July 9, Hamilton hit the first walk-off home run of his career, against Francisco Rodríguez.

Fans selected Hamilton as one of the starting outfielders for the AL at the 2008 Major League Baseball All-Star Game at Yankee Stadium. He finished first in voting among outfielders. He was one of seven first-time starters in the game. Along with Kosuke Fukudome, Geovany Soto, and Ryan Braun, Hamilton was one of four who had made their MLB debut in 2007 or 2008. He was selected to participate in the 2008 Major League Baseball Home Run Derby as part of the All-Star festivities. Hamilton selected 71-year-old Clay Council to throw to him during the Derby. Council was a volunteer who threw batting practice for him as a child in Raleigh, North Carolina. In the first round of the event Hamilton hit 28 home runs, breaking the single-round record of 24 set by Bobby Abreu in 2005. Hamilton ended up hitting the most total home runs in the contest with 35, but lost in the final round to Justin Morneau, as the scores were reset. His record-setting first round included 13 straight home runs at one point, and seven that went further than 500 feet (150 m). His longest home run was 518 feet. In 2006, when Hamilton was trying to get back into baseball, he had a dream in which he participated in a Home Run Derby at Yankee Stadium, but he could not remember how many home runs he had hit. After the Derby, Hamilton said: "This was like living the dream out, because like I've said, I didn't know the ending to that dream."

On August 17, Hamilton was intentionally walked with the bases loaded against the Rays in the bottom of the ninth, with the Rays leading 7–3, to bring Marlon Byrd to the plate. The Rays went on to win the game 7–4. Hamilton thus became the sixth player in history, and the first American League player in 107 years, to receive an intentional walk with the bases loaded.

In the 2008 season, Hamilton had a .304 batting average, 32 home runs, and an American League-leading 130 runs batted in. He won a Silver Slugger Award and finished seventh in the balloting for AL MVP, behind Dustin Pedroia, Justin Morneau, Kevin Youkilis, Joe Mauer, Carlos Quentin, and Francisco Rodríguez.

==== 2009 ====
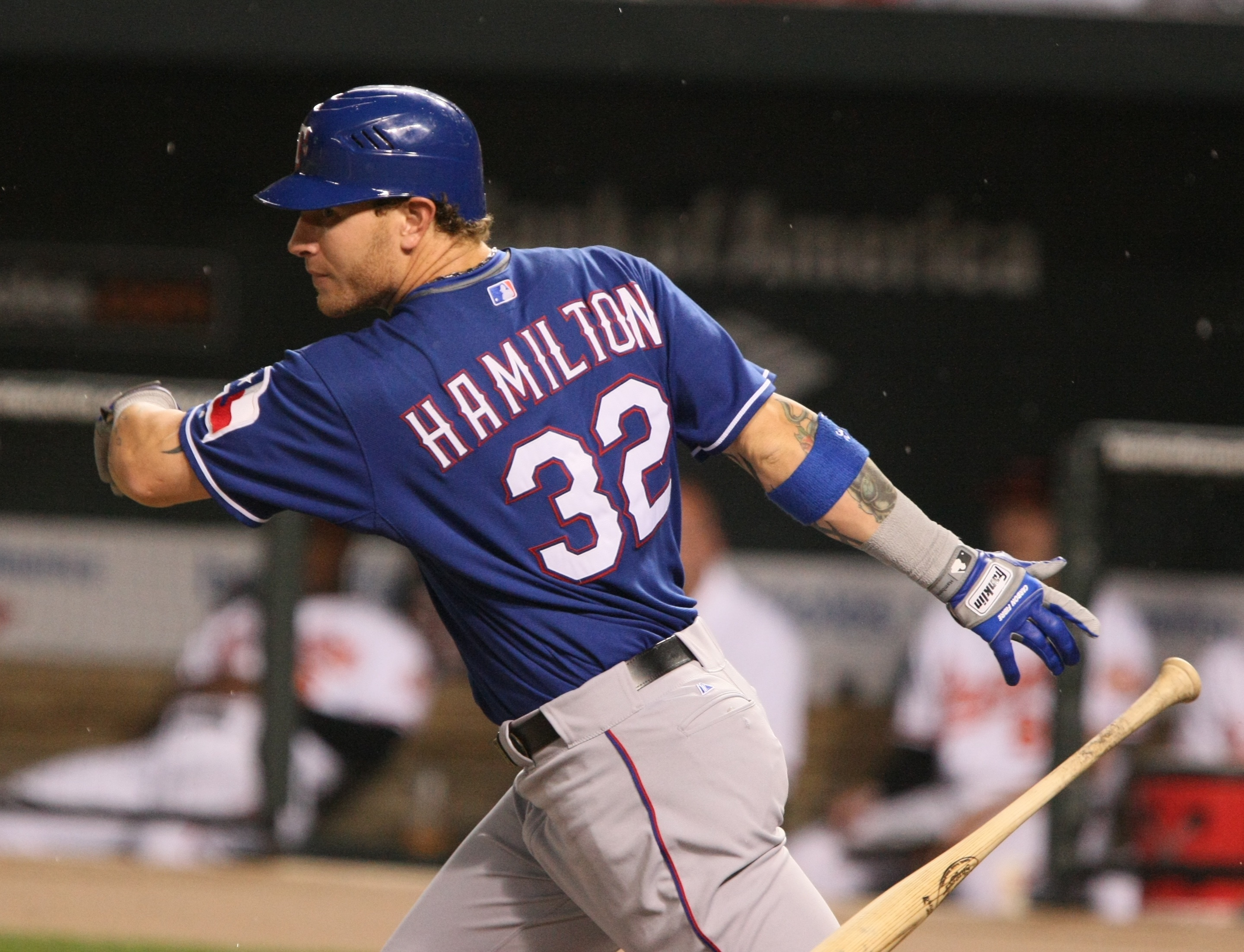
Hamilton with the Rangers in 2009

Hamilton endured an injury-plagued season in 2009.

In spring training, Hamilton led all players in RBIs, with 27, and total bases, with 59, in 81 at-bats. He hit a 460 ft (140 m) home run into the right field home run porch off Angels reliever Shane Loux in the bottom of the eighth inning on May 15 in Arlington. Then, in the same series against the Angels, Hamilton leaped at the wall in center field and slammed into it, robbing Howie Kendrick of a possible home run. In June 2009, Hamilton went on the disabled list with an abdominal strain caused by the May wall collision. On June 9, Hamilton underwent a successful surgical procedure to repair the tear. He was expected to be out for four to six weeks.

Though injured, Hamilton was selected by fan voting to play in the 2009 All-Star game.

In August 2009, Hamilton acknowledged that he had become intoxicated at an Arizona bar in January and had been photographed "in lurid poses" with women other than his wife. Hamilton apologized for his behavior.

Hamilton batted .268 with 10 home runs and 54 RBIs in 2009.

==== 2010: MVP season and trip to World Series ====
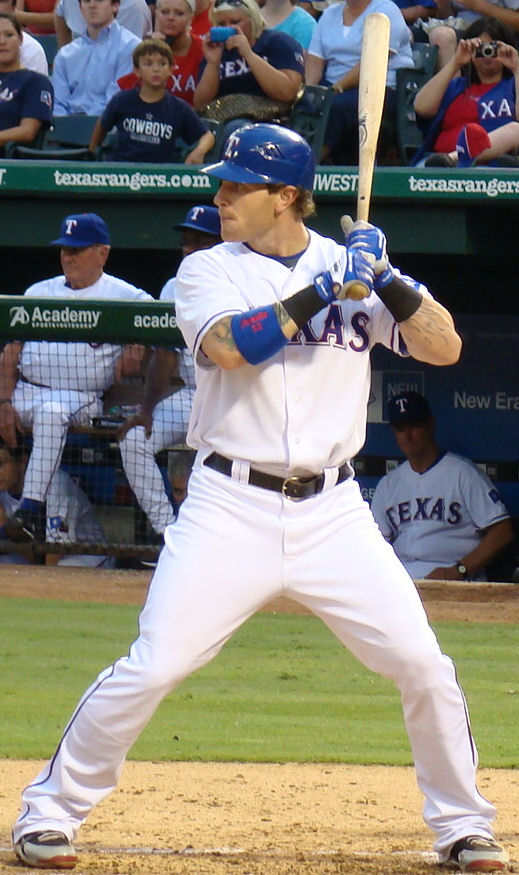
Hamilton in 2010

In 2010, Hamilton was moved to left field to make room for Julio Borbon in center field. As in his prior two seasons with the Rangers, Hamilton was selected to start in the 2010 All-Star Game. He was one of six members of the Rangers to represent the franchise at the 2010 All-Star Game. Hamilton entered the All-Star Break with a .346 batting average, tied for first in the AL with Miguel Cabrera.

On August 27, Hamilton set a Rangers record with his 24th three-hit game of the season. On September 4, Hamilton bruised his rib cage after making a leaping catch and crashing into an outfield wall. He was later found to have two fractured ribs. Hamilton returned to the lineup on October 1, hitting a home run the next day.

Hamilton hit for a league-leading .359 average in 2010, winning his first batting title. He also finished fourth in Major League Baseball in OBP (.411), first in slugging percentage (.633) and OPS (1.044), and tied for 10th in home runs (32), despite missing 29 games due to an injury.

On October 22, Hamilton and the Rangers won the 2010 ALCS, defeating the New York Yankees in six games. With four home runs and seven RBIs, Hamilton won the ALCS MVP Award.

The 2010 World Series was the Rangers' first-ever World Series. The Rangers were defeated by the San Francisco Giants, four games to one. Hamilton hit .100 with one home run and one run batted in.

Hamilton won the AL Players Choice Award for Outstanding Player in 2010. He also won a Silver Slugger Award. On November 23, 2010, Hamilton was voted the American League Most Valuable Player.

==== 2011: Second trip to World Series ====
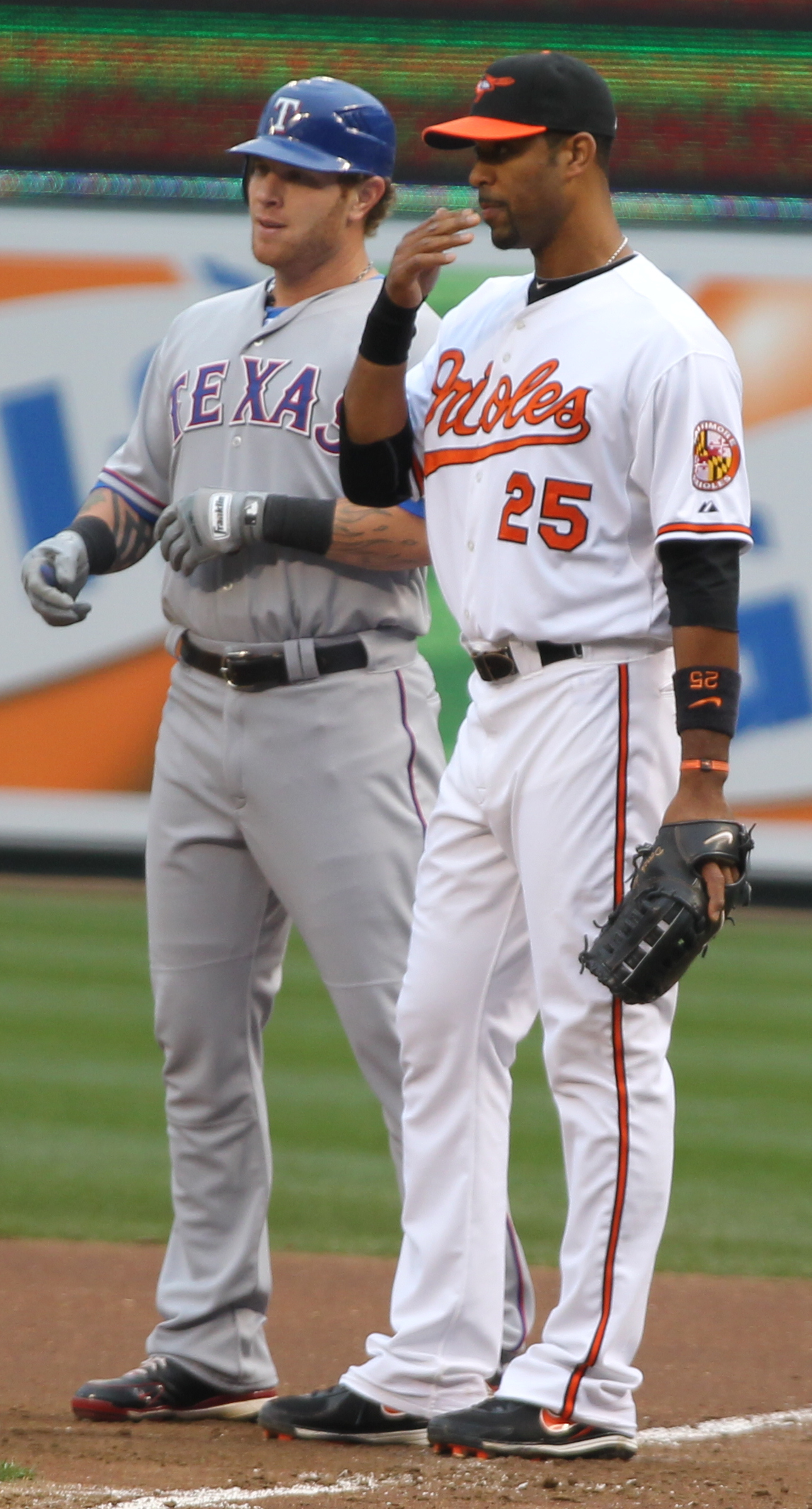
Hamilton and Derrek Lee of the Baltimore Orioles in 2011

On February 10, 2011, Hamilton avoided arbitration by signing a contract for two years and $24 million with the Rangers. On April 12, in Detroit, he suffered a fracture to his right humerus on a play at home plate. He returned to the Rangers' lineup on May 23, and went 2–4 against Chicago White Sox pitcher John Danks, hitting his first home run of the season on the second pitch he saw during his first at-bat. He was an All-Star in 2011.

On July 7, during a home game at Rangers Ballpark, a 39-year-old firefighter died while catching a foul ball tossed into the stands by Hamilton. The fan, Shannon Stone, leaned over the rail to catch the ball and fell 20 feet. It was the third incident in which a fan fell out of the stands at Rangers Ballpark. On September 30, the son of the fallen firefighter threw out the ceremonial first pitch to Hamilton to start the American League Division Series.

In the 2011 season, Hamilton batted .298 with 25 home runs. He was third in the American League in sacrifice flies (10), sixth in intentional walks (13), and eighth in slugging percentage (.536).

The Rangers defeated the Detroit Tigers four games to two in the 2011 American League Championship Series to advance to the World Series for the second consecutive season. In the 2011 World Series, the St. Louis Cardinals defeated the Rangers in seven games. Hamilton hit .241 with one home run and six runs batted in during the Series.

==== 2012: Continued success ====
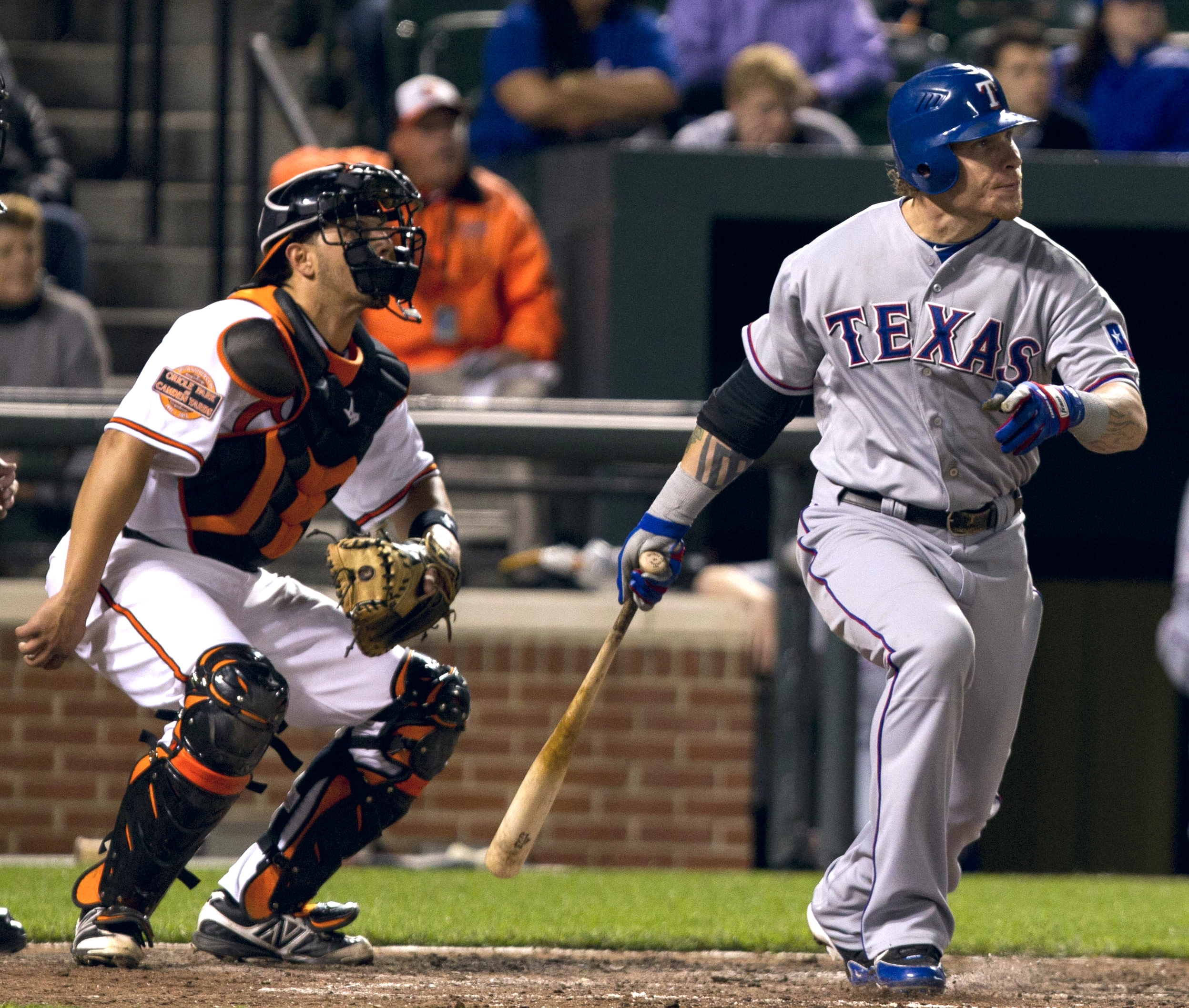
Hamilton hitting a home run during a game against the Baltimore Orioles in 2012

On February 2, 2012, it was reported Hamilton had suffered a relapse with alcohol. Hamilton held a press conference on February 3, 2012, to apologize for his actions.

Hamilton hit .395 with nine home runs and 25 RBI during the month of April and was named the league's AL Player of the Month. His home run total for the month tied a franchise record for April with four other Rangers.

On May 8, in a 10–3 win over the Baltimore Orioles at Camden Yards, Hamilton registered multiple career-highs; he had five hits in five at-bats, hitting four two-run home runs and a double for a total of eight runs batted in. In doing this, he not only became just the 16th player in MLB history to hit four home runs in one game and the first to do so since Carlos Delgado in 2003, but also set the American League record for most total bases in a single game with 18. Hamilton was one base shy of tying the Major League record.

Hamilton was selected to appear in his fifth All-Star Game after accumulating the most fan votes by any player in the history of the All-Star Game selection process. José Bautista held the previous record with 7,454,753 votes in 2011 until Hamilton received 11,073,744 in 2012. The record stood until 2015, when Josh Donaldson received 14,090,188 votes.

Because Hamilton had been hitting .190 with a slugging percentage of .374 since June 1, Manager Ron Washington moved Hamilton to the fifth spot in the batting order before a game with the White Sox on July 29. Washington said he moved Hamilton in hopes of taking some of the pressure off of him. Hamilton responded quickly; on July 29, he recorded multiple walks for the first time in the month of July and did not record a strikeout for the first time in seven games. On July 30 he went 3–for–4 with a home run, his first game recording greater than two hits since May 11.

For the 2012 season, Hamilton hit .285 with 43 home runs and 128 runs batted in and finished in fifth place in the American League Most Valuable Player voting. He also won his third Silver Slugger Award. The Rangers lost the 2012 American League Wild Card Game to the Baltimore Orioles.

=== Los Angeles Angels of Anaheim (2013–2015) ===
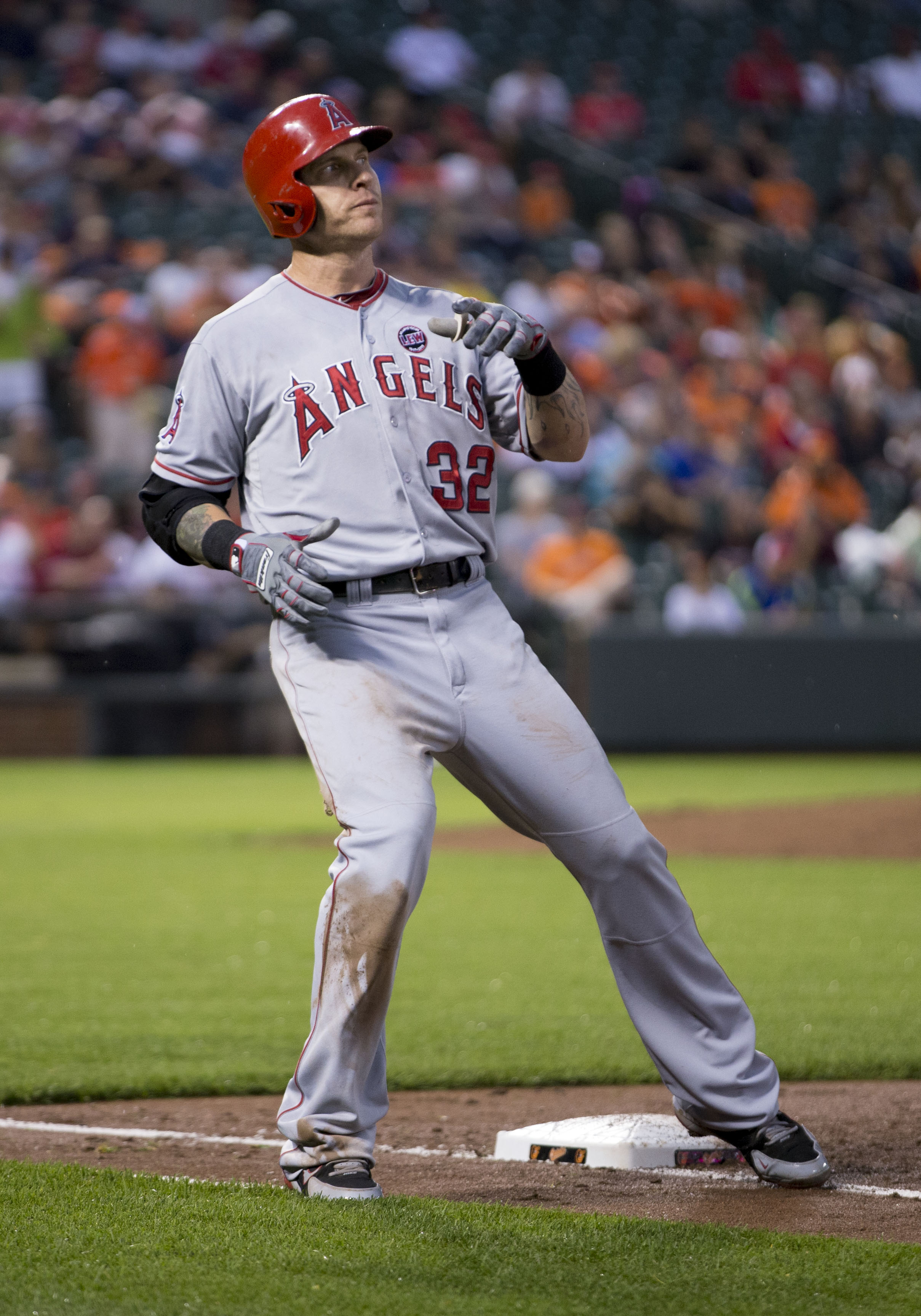
Hamilton with the Angels in 2013

On December 13, 2012, Hamilton agreed in principle to a five-year contract worth $125 million with the Los Angeles Angels of Anaheim. This deal became official on December 15. Hamilton's Angels tenure was not a successful one.

==== 2013 ====
During his first year with the Angels, Hamilton played in 151 games, batting .250 with 21 home runs and 79 RBIs.

==== 2014 ====
In the 2014 season, Hamilton batted .263 with 10 home runs and 44 RBIs in 89 games. Hamilton incurred a thumb injury and a shoulder injury during the season.

In the ALDS against the Kansas City Royals, Hamilton went hitless (going 0-for-13 overall).

==== 2015 ====
In February 2015, Hamilton underwent shoulder surgery to repair a separated shoulder. While he was recovering, it was revealed he had a relapse into his drug addiction, which he voluntarily reported to MLB. An outside arbitrator ruled Hamilton's voluntary admission did not violate baseball's drug policy, and he could not be suspended. Despite the ruling, Angels owner Arte Moreno made comments to the media implying that he did not want Hamilton back on the team's roster. Furthermore, all Hamilton-related merchandise items were removed and recalled from all stores. The Players Association and several Angels players spoke up in Hamilton's defense. The Angels began to lay out a rehabilitation plan for him, but shortly afterwards, trade rumors were reported.

Hamilton was traded back to the Rangers on April 27, 2015, for cash or a player to be named later. The Angels remained responsible for paying most of the remaining money due to him under the five-year contract he signed with them in 2012. The contract that Hamilton signed with the Angels is widely regarded as one of the worst free agent signings in MLB history.

=== Second stint with the Texas Rangers (2015) ===
==== 2015 ====
After rehabilitating his injured shoulder between the Rangers' AA and AAA Minor League affiliates, Hamilton was called up to the MLB team on May 24, and was inserted into the starting lineup on May 25 in a Memorial Day matchup in Cleveland against the Indians. He recorded his first hit back with the Rangers on May 25. On May 28 of the same year, Hamilton returned to Texas for the first time in a Rangers uniform since leaving the team after the 2012 season. He received a standing ovation, hit a double on the first pitch he saw, and went 2–4 in the game, driving in the only run for his own team in a 5–1 loss. On May 29, Hamilton hit two home runs in his first multi-homer game with the Rangers since 2012, leading the team to a 7–4 victory. Two days later, he hit a pinch-hit two-run double vs. the Red Sox to win the game in walk-off fashion, 4–3. On July 30, 2015, Hamilton recorded four RBI in a 7–6 Rangers' win over the New York Yankees.

For the 2015 season, Hamilton hit .253 with eight home runs and 25 runs batted in in 50 games.

In the ALDS, Hamilton's first hit was a single in Game 3. This ended his postseason hitless streak at 31 at-bats, which tied for the second-longest such streak of all time.

==== 2016 ====
On May 25, 2016, it was announced that Hamilton would be out for the entire 2016 season after undergoing knee surgery for the third time in nine months. The Rangers activated Hamilton from the disabled list and released him on August 23.

==== 2017 ====
Hamilton did not play in 2017. On January 16, 2017, Texas re-signed Hamilton to a minor-league deal with intentions of him trying out at first base. On February 26, it was revealed Hamilton was experiencing discomfort in his left knee—the same knee on which he had undergone surgery during the 2016 season. On February 27, Hamilton underwent surgery on his left knee to repair torn cartilage that was causing discomfort. On April 21, the Rangers released Hamilton after revealing that he suffered a right knee injury while rehabilitating his left knee.

=== Career statistics and recognition ===
In 1,027 games over nine seasons, Hamilton posted a .290 batting average (1,134-for-3,909) with 609 runs, 234 doubles, 24 triples, 200 home runs, 701 RBI, 50 stolen bases, 352 bases on balls, .349 on-base percentage and .516 slugging percentage. Defensively, he recorded a .980 fielding percentage playing at all three outfield positions. In 42 postseason games, he hit .202 (33-for-163) with 18 runs, 9 doubles, 6 home runs, 23 RBI, 4 stolen bases and 15 walks for a .633 OPS overall. Hamilton was inducted into the Texas Rangers Hall of Fame in 2019.

== Personal life ==
=== Family ===
Hamilton was married to Katie (née Chadwick), the daughter of Michael Chadwick who helped guide him in his recovery from drugs and alcohol abuse for several years. They started dating in 2002 when he returned to Raleigh, and married in 2004. In early 2015, shortly after another substance-abuse relapse, Hamilton filed for divorce from Katie after 11 years of marriage. The couple had three daughters together, along with Katie's daughter from a previous relationship.

=== Drug addiction and alcoholism ===
Prior to the 2001 season, Hamilton was involved in an automobile accident. His mother and father were also injured but recovered. The 2001 season marked the beginning of Hamilton's drug and alcohol use, and he made his first attempt at rehabilitation. He first stopped using drugs and alcohol after being confronted by his grandmother, Mary Holt. During spring training of the 2003 season, Hamilton failed his first drug test. Hamilton was hoping to return to spring training with the Devil Rays in 2004, though was suspended 30 days and fined for violating the drug policy put in place by MLB. A "failed" test is one in which there is a positive result for a drug more severe than marijuana. A month later, MLB suspended him for the entire season after he failed two more tests.

Hamilton was out of baseball for almost three years. He made several attempts at rehabilitation. He was arrested before the 2005 season for smashing the windshield of a friend's truck. The Rays placed Hamilton on the restricted list, moving him off the 40-man roster. After another relapse, MLB suspended him for the entire 2006 season. During the days of his most prolific abuse, Hamilton met a businessman named Michael Chadwick, who made an attempt to steer him in the right direction. It was through this relationship Hamilton ended up meeting his wife, Katie, who was Chadwick's daughter. Hamilton's return to baseball was helped along by former minor league outfielder and manager Roy Silver, who owned a baseball academy in Florida. After hearing about Hamilton's desire to return to baseball, Silver offered the use of his facility if Hamilton agreed to work there. Hamilton first started working at Silver's Academy in January 2006. His duties included cleaning the bathrooms and raking the infield. Hamilton spent his nights sleeping on an air mattress in one of the facility's offices.

In 2007, The New York Times reported that Hamilton provided urine samples for drug testing at least three times per week to comply with the provisions of MLB's drug policy.

A portion of the story of Hamilton's return to sobriety was shown on The Learning Channel's reality show "The Real Deal". "A Home Run for Trademark" aired March 31, 2007, and chronicled the renovation of Shoeless Joe Jackson's house during 2006. Richard C. Davis, the owner of Trademark Properties, hired Hamilton as the construction foreman. Davis was negotiating the purchase of a minor league baseball team and entertaining the idea of giving Hamilton a chance to join the team.

In May 2008, Hamilton said he had not used drugs or alcohol since October 6, 2005.

When giving a brief summary of his recovery, Hamilton has said: "It's a God thing." He has stated publicly that he believes that Jesus brought him back from the brink, and that faith is what keeps him going. Hamilton also wrote an autobiography called Beyond Belief which explains how he quit drugs and alcohol and found a relationship with God.

In late 2008, Hamilton, among other celebrities such as Brian Welch and Greg Ellis, appeared in testimonial videos entitled "I Am Second". In his video, Hamilton shared his story of recovering from drug use with the help of his Christian faith.

Hamilton confirmed that he had suffered a relapse in early 2009 after photos were released in August 2009. Sports website Deadspin posted photos of Hamilton shirtless in a bar in Tempe, Arizona with several women. According to reports, witnesses saw Hamilton drinking, heard him asking where he could obtain cocaine, and heard him reveal his plans to go to a strip club later that evening. The photos do not show Hamilton drinking or taking any illegal drugs.

Although this news did not break until August 2009, Hamilton revealed he had informed his wife, the Texas Rangers, and MLB the day after the incident occurred. Hamilton called a press conference on August 8 to discuss the photos. Regarding the incident, Hamilton said:

Obviously it was one of those things that reinforce that I can't have alcohol. I got away from the one thing that kept me on the straight and narrow and that was my relationship with the Lord. That should always come first.

Hamilton also admitted he had very little memory of the night after getting drunk. MLB tested Hamilton for illegal drugs two days after the incident and he passed that test.

Hamilton's Rangers teammates—mindful of his past struggles—chose to celebrate major events (such as winning the 2010 American League Division Series and 2010 American League Championship Series) with ginger ale instead of champagne. The Rangers repeated the celebrations with ginger ale the following postseason when they won their second consecutive pennant and reached the 2011 World Series.

On February 2, 2012, it was reported Hamilton had suffered a relapse with alcohol. He claimed to have had two or three drinks before inviting his friend and then-teammate, Ian Kinsler, to talk at a bar. Hamilton held a press conference on February 3, 2012, to apologize for his actions.

In February 2015, Hamilton relapsed, using both cocaine and alcohol. Hamilton voluntarily reported his relapse to MLB. An outside arbitrator ruled Hamilton's voluntary admission did not violate baseball's drug policy, and he could not be suspended.

=== Legal issues ===
Hamilton was arrested on October 30, 2019, and charged with injury to a child, a third-degree felony, after being accused of physically assaulting his oldest daughter. On April 8, 2020, Hamilton was indicted on a felony charge for allegedly beating his daughter. The charge carried a sentence of up to ten years in prison. On February 22, 2022, Hamilton pleaded guilty to unlawful restraint, a misdemeanor. Hamilton received a year of probation, was fined $500, and was ordered to perform 20 hours of community service; the court also imposed other requirements upon him. According to the court, the charge against him will be dismissed if he satisfies the probation requirements.

== See also ==
- List of Major League Baseball annual runs batted in leaders
- List of Major League Baseball batting champions
- Major League Baseball Most Valuable Player Award
- List of Major League Baseball single-game records

Awards and achievements
Preceded by David Ortiz (September 2007); Adrián Beltré (September 2011)	American League Player of the Month; April 2008, May 2008; April 2012, May 2012	Succeeded by J. D. Drew; José Bautista
Preceded by Carlos Delgado	Batters with 4 home runs in one game May 8, 2012	Succeeded by Scooter Gennett
Preceded by Roy Halladay	Best Major League Baseball Player ESPY Award; 2012	Succeeded by Miguel Cabrera
