= Than Merrill =

American football player (born 1977)

No. 22
- Position: Safety

Personal information
- Born: December 12, 1977 (age 48); Fresno, California, U.S.
- Listed height: 6 ft 3 in (1.91 m)
- Listed weight: 220 lb (100 kg)

Career information
- High school: Fresno (CA)
- College: Yale
- NFL draft: 2001: 7th round, 223rd overall pick

Career history
- Tampa Bay Buccaneers (2001)*; Chicago Bears (2001); Barcelona Dragons (2002); Amsterdam Admirals (2003); Tampa Bay Buccaneers (2003)
- * Offseason or practice squad member only

Career NFL statistics
- Games played: 15
- Games started: 0
- Tackles: 7
- Stats at Pro Football Reference

Nathaniel Merrill (born December 12, 1977) is an American businessman, television personality, and former professional football player. He is the co-owner of the real estate company CT Homes and the real estate investing educational company FortuneBuilders Inc. He was featured in the A&E's Flip This House in seasons 3, 4, and 5, airing in 2007 to 2009, as part of the "New Haven" team.

== Football career ==
In high school Merrill was selected as an All-Far West Quarterback. In college, he started as a strong safety at Yale University, where he was named to Yale's First-team All-Ivy Selections from 1999 to 2001. After graduating from Yale he was selected by the Tampa Bay Buccaneers in the seventh round of the 2001 NFL draft, but ultimately signed as a free agent with the Chicago Bears for the 2001 season. He spent one season with the Bears, and registered 7 tackles. He was later allocated by the Bears to the Barcelona Dragons of NFL Europe. In 2003, Merrill was signed by the Buccaneers and was allocated again to NFLE, this time to the Amsterdam Admirals. In 2003, Merrill suffered a career-ending knee injury. In 2004 he played one game at quarterback and safety for the Carinthian Cowboys of the Austrian Football League.

== Real estate career ==
Merrill co-founded CT Homes, LLC in 2004. The residential real estate investment company purchases, redevelops, and sells residential, multi-family, and commercial property.

Merrill and CT Homes caught the attention of the producers of Flip This House, a popular reality TV show featured on A&E, during their nationwide search for a real estate investing business. The show documented and educated prospective entrepreneurs on the intricacies of buying and selling real estate. Merrill's “New Haven” team was featured on the last three seasons, from 2007 to 2009.

Merrill helped open Realty National Inc., a San Diego Real Estate Brokerage affiliated with CT Homes, in 2011. Realty National Inc. was established in Pacific Beach, San Diego and has continued to open other offices throughout California and the United States including; Orange County, Sacramento and Boston, MA. Merrill wrote The Real Estate Wholesaling Bible: The Fastest, Easiest Way to Get Started in Real Estate, which was published on April 21, 2014.
