= Brian Trow =

- Born: Atlanta, Georgia, USA
- Occupation: House "Flipper"

Brian Trow is a co-founder of Atlanta-based Foundations Investment Group, LLC, with Peter Pasternack. He and the company, which was established in 2005, specialize in "flipping" houses. Some of the endeavors of the company are featured in two seasons of the television series Flip This House. In season three, they work alongside — and provide the capital for — private house-flippers Angela and Harris Wilford; in season four, however, they go out on their own. Trow, who is Foundations' creative director, takes on the role of general contractor on the job site and regularly provides piece-to-camera updates in the recorded flips.

== Personal life ==
Trow's father, Don, an industrial arts and woodworking teacher, appears in the season-four episode of Flip This House entitled "Flip in Trouble". His mother, Shirley, also appears in a later episode during the same season.

Trow graduated from Wartburg College, Iowa, with a degree in Fitness Management. He lives in Atlanta with his wife, Patti. They have two children.
