= Norm Zauchin =

American baseball player (1929–1999)

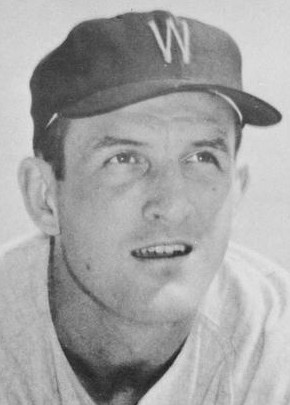
- Zauchin in 1959
- First baseman
- Born: November 17, 1929; Royal Oak, Michigan, U.S.
- Died: January 31, 1999 (aged 69); Birmingham, Alabama, U.S.
- Batted: Right Threw: Right

MLB debut
- September 23, 1951, for the Boston Red Sox

Last MLB appearance
- May 2, 1959, for the Washington Senators

MLB statistics
- Batting average: .233
- Home runs: 50
- Runs batted in: 159
- Stats at Baseball Reference

Teams
- Boston Red Sox (1951, 1955–1957); Washington Senators (1958–1959)

Norbert Henry Zauchin (November 17, 1929 – January 31, 1999) was an American professional baseball first baseman. He played all or part of six seasons in Major League Baseball for the Boston Red Sox (1951, 1955–57) and Washington Senators (1958–59). He batted and threw right-handed, stood 6 feet 4 inches (1.93 m) tall and weighed 220 pounds (100 kg). In a six-season career, Zauchin was a .233 hitter with 50 home runs and 159 RBI in 346 games. He is most remembered for driving in 10 runs during a major league game.

A native of Royal Oak, Michigan, Zauchin graduated from Royal Oak High School in 1948. He served two years in the United States Army during the Korean War and then became a major league baseball player. He started his professional career in 1950 with the Double-A Birmingham Barons, where he set a Rickwood Field field record with 35 home runs.

His most productive season came in 1955, when he hit .239 with 27 home runs for the Red Sox and finished third in American League Rookie of the Year voting, behind Herb Score and Billy Klaus. Zauchin played in 130 games and led AL first basemen in fielding percentage (.995). On May 27, 1955, Zauchin collected 10 RBI with three home runs and a double in the first five innings of a 16–0 victory over Washington.

Before the 1958 season, Zauchin was traded with Albie Pearson to the Senators for Pete Runnels. Zauchin retired in 1960 after spending his last year in the minor leagues.

Zauchin died from prostate cancer in Birmingham, Alabama at the age of 69. He was inducted into the Royal Oak High School Hall of Fame in 1997. His grandson, Chad Smith, is a baseball player.
