= Peter Pasternack =

- Born: Atlanta, Georgia, US
- Occupation(s): Certified Public Accountant, House "Flipper"

Peter Pasternack is a certified public accountant and a co-founder of Atlanta-based Foundations Investment Group, LLC, with Brian Trow. He and the company, which was established in 2005, specialize in "flipping" houses. Some of the company's endeavors are featured in two seasons of the television series Flip This House. In season three, they work alongside — and provide the capital for — private house-flippers Angela and Harris Wilford; in season four, however, they go out on their own. Pasternack is responsible for the operational and financial aspects of Foundations.

Pasternack is a former employee of PricewaterhouseCoopers and Piedmont Bank of Georgia.

== Personal life ==
Pasternack is a graduate of the University of Georgia. He graduated with an undergraduate and master's degree in accounting.
