= Mark Whiten =

American baseball player (born 1966)

- Right fielder
- Born: November 25, 1966 (age 59); Pensacola, Florida, U.S.
- Batted: Switch Threw: Right

MLB debut
- July 12, 1990, for the Toronto Blue Jays

Last MLB appearance
- May 11, 2000, for the Cleveland Indians

MLB statistics
- Batting average: .259
- Home runs: 105
- Runs batted in: 423
- Stats at Baseball Reference

Teams
- Toronto Blue Jays (1990–1991); Cleveland Indians (1991–1992); St. Louis Cardinals (1993–1994); Boston Red Sox (1995); Philadelphia Phillies (1995–1996); Atlanta Braves (1996); Seattle Mariners (1996); New York Yankees (1997); Cleveland Indians (1998–2000)

Career highlights and awards
- Hit four home runs in one game on September 7, 1993; MLB record 12 RBI in a one game (Note: Tied with Jim Bottomley)

Mark Anthony Whiten (/ˈhwɪtɛn/ WHIT-en; born November 25, 1966) is an American former professional baseball outfielder and switch-hitting batter, who played in Major League Baseball (MLB) for the Toronto Blue Jays (1990–1991), Cleveland Indians (1991–1992, 1998–2000), St. Louis Cardinals (1993–1994), Boston Red Sox (1995), Philadelphia Phillies (1996), Atlanta Braves (1996), Seattle Mariners (1996), and New York Yankees (1997). He became known by the nickname "Hard-Hittin'" Mark Whiten. In 1993, Whiten became the 12th player in major league history to hit four home runs in a single game and tied the all-time single game RBI record with 12.

== Early life ==
Whiten was born in Pensacola, Florida on November 25, 1966. He did not play baseball competitively until his senior year at Pensacola High School but managed to earn a scholarship to play baseball at Pensacola State College.

== Career ==
=== Toronto Blue Jays and Cleveland Indians ===
He was selected by Toronto in the 1986 amateur draft and made his major league debut in the 1990 season. Whiten was an up-and-down player. He had one of the best outfield arms in the 1990s and hit for power. The Blue Jays had little patience with his development and sent him to Cleveland. After two seasons with the Indians he was sent to the Cardinals.

=== St. Louis Cardinals ===
In his first season with St. Louis, Whiten recorded nine outfield assists, fifth-best in the National League. On September 7, 1993, he gained notability with his performance against the Cincinnati Reds in the second game of a doubleheader. Whiten hit four home runs and drove in 12 runs, tying the all-time single-game records in both categories in the process. He also tied the major league mark for runs batted in in a doubleheader (13), set by Nate Colbert in 1972. Whiten became the 12th player in major league history to hit four home runs in one game; he and Jim Bottomley are the only two players with 12 RBI in one game.

During the same season, he belted a 464-foot homer into the upper deck at Three Rivers Stadium, becoming the first visiting player to reach the right-field overhang. He finished that year with a .253 batting average, to go along with 25 home runs and 99 RBI.

=== Later career ===
Whiten suffered through pulled rib cage muscles early at the 1994 season that limited him to play in 92 games. Injuries would limit him to no more than 136 games a season. Over the following six seasons, he played for six teams, including a second stint with Cleveland. In 1997, Whiten faced sexual assault charges while playing with the New York Yankees. On July 31, 1998, Whiten pitched his only inning of professional ball, for Cleveland against the Oakland Athletics. He walked two and gave up a hit and an earned run, but also struck out the side (which included future AL MVP Miguel Tejada). He thus has a perfect career K/9 ratio of 27.

In his 11-year major-league career, Whiten had a .259 batting average, with 105 home runs, 423 RBIs, 465 runs scored, 804 hits, 129 doubles, 20 triples, and 70 stolen bases in 939 games. He resumed his playing career with the Long Island Ducks in the Atlantic League.

== Notes ==
Achievements
Preceded by Bob Horner	Batters with 4 home runs in one game September 7, 1993	Succeeded by Mike Cameron
