= Run batted in =

Statistic used in baseball and softball

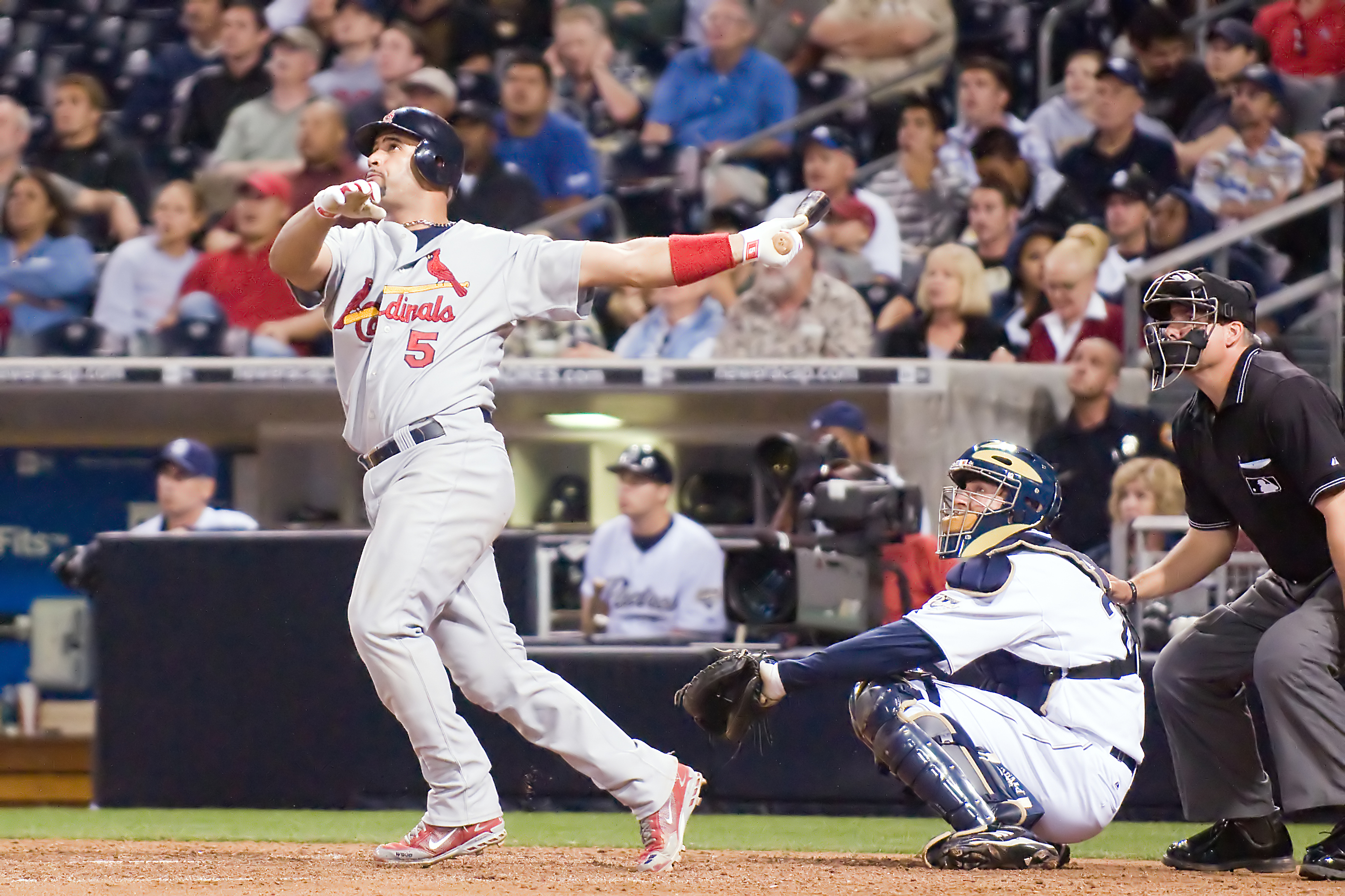
St. Louis Cardinals' Albert Pujols, shown here in 2008, passed Babe Ruth's 2,214 official RBI in October 2022. Pujols finished his Major League Baseball career with 2,218 RBI and second place on the all-time list.

A run batted in (Note: The plural form is "runs batted in".) (RBI) is a statistic in baseball and softball that credits a batter for making a play that allows a run to be scored. For example, if the batter bats a base hit which allows a teammate already on base to reach home, thus scoring a run, then the batter gets credited with an RBI. Certain situations are excluded, such as when an error is made on the play.

Before the 1920 Major League Baseball season, runs batted in were not an official baseball statistic. Nevertheless, the RBI statistic was tabulated—unofficially—from 1907 through 1919 by baseball writer Ernie Lanigan, according to the Society for American Baseball Research.

Common nicknames for an RBI include "ribby" (or "ribbie"), "rib", and "ribeye". The plural of "RBI" is a matter of "(very) minor controversy" for baseball fans: it is usually "RBIs", in accordance with the usual practice for pluralizing initialisms in English; however, some sources use "RBI" as the plural, on the basis that it can stand for "runs batted in".

== Major League Baseball rules ==
The 2018 edition of the Official Baseball Rules of Major League Baseball (MLB), Rule 9.04 Runs Batted In, reads:

A run batted in is a statistic credited to a batter whose action at bat causes one or more runs to score, as outlined in Rule 9.04.

(a) The official scorer shall credit the batter with a run batted in for every run that scores

(1) unaided by an error and as part of a play begun by the batter's safe hit (including the batter's home run), sacrifice bunt, sacrifice fly, infield out, or fielder's choice unless Rule 9.04(b) applies;
(2) by reason of the batter becoming a runner with the bases full (because of a base on balls, an award of first base for being touched by a pitched ball or for interference or obstruction); or
(3) when, before two are out, an error is made on a play on which a runner from third base ordinarily would score.

(b) The official scorer shall not credit a run batted in

(1) when the batter grounds into a force double play or a reverse-force double play; or
(2) when a fielder is charged with an error because the fielder muffs a throw at first base that would have completed a force double play.

(c) The official scorer's judgment must determine whether a run batted in shall be credited for a run that scores when a fielder holds the ball or throws to a wrong base. Ordinarily, if the runner keeps going, the official scorer should credit a run batted in; if the runner stops and takes off again when the runner notices the misplay, the official scorer should credit the run as scored on a fielder's choice.

From 1980 to 1988, the game-winning RBI was an additional statistic used in MLB.

== Criticism ==
The perceived significance of the RBI is displayed by the fact that it is one of the three categories that compose the triple crown. In addition, career RBIs are often cited in debates over who should be elected to the Hall of Fame. However, critics, particularly within the field of sabermetrics, argue that RBIs measure the quality of the lineup more than it does the player himself. This is because an RBI can only be credited to a player if one or more batters preceding him in the batting order have reached base (the exception to this being a home run, in which the batter is credited with driving himself in, not just those already on base). This implies that better offensive teams—and therefore, the teams in which the most players get on base—tend to produce hitters with higher RBI totals than equivalent hitters on lesser-hitting teams.

== RBI leaders in Major League Baseball ==
=== Career ===
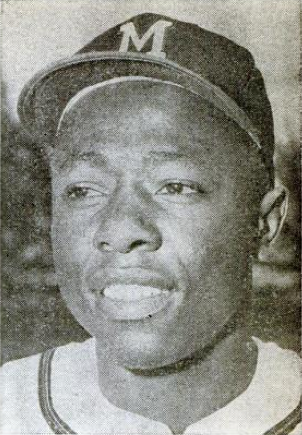
Hank Aaron, All-time career leader in RBI with 2,297.

Totals are current through 2025 (regular season). Active player is in bold.

1. Hank Aaron – 2,297
2. Albert Pujols - 2,218
3. Babe Ruth – 2,214
4. Alex Rodríguez – 2,086
5. Cap Anson - 2,075
6. Barry Bonds – 1,996
7. Lou Gehrig – 1,995
8. Stan Musial – 1,951
9. Ty Cobb – 1,944
10. Jimmie Foxx – 1,922
11. Eddie Murray – 1,917
12. Willie Mays - 1,909

=== Season ===
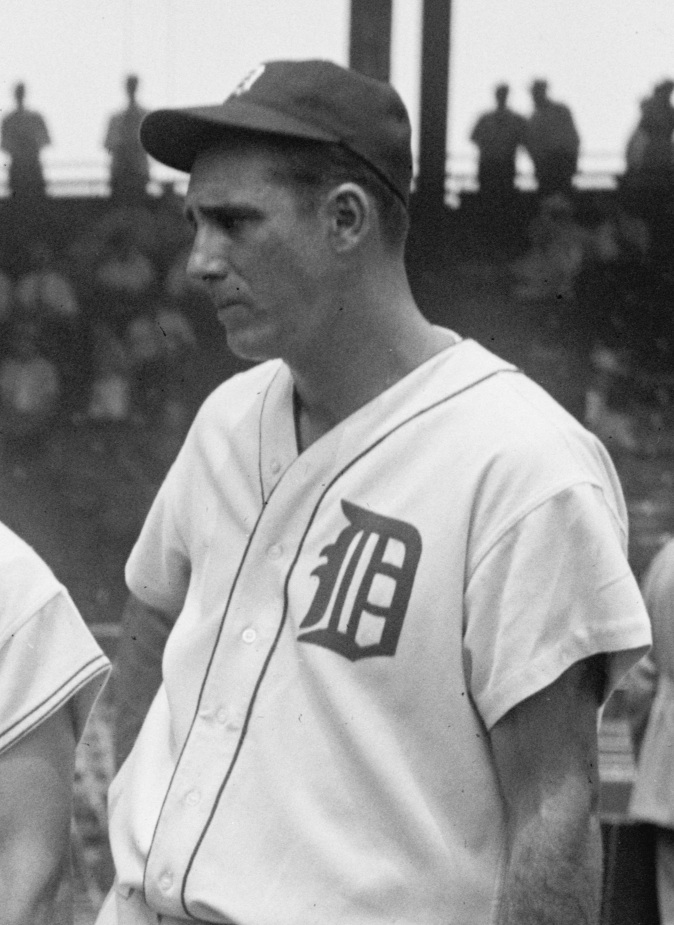
Hank Greenberg, Hall of Famer and 2-time MVP

1. Hack Wilson (1930) – 191
2. Lou Gehrig (1931) – 185
3. Hank Greenberg (1937) – 183
4. Jimmie Foxx (1938) – 175
5. Lou Gehrig (1927, 1930) – 173

=== Game ===
- 12 RBIs
  - Jim Bottomley (September 16, 1924)
  - Mark Whiten (September 7, 1993)
- 11 RBIs
  - Wilbert Robinson (June 10, 1892)
  - Tony Lazzeri (May 24, 1936)
  - Phil Weintraub (April 30, 1944)
- 10 RBIs
  - By 12 MLB players, most recently **Shohei Ohtani** on September 19, 2024

=== Inning ===
1. Fernando Tatís (April 23, 1999) – 8
2. Ed Cartwright (September 23, 1890) – 7
3. Alex Rodriguez (October 4, 2009) – 7

=== Postseason (single season) ===
1. **Adolis García** (2023) – 22
2. David Freese (2011) – 21
3. **Corey Seager** (2020) – 20
4. Scott Spiezio (2002) – 19
5. Sandy Alomar Jr. (1997) – 19
6. David Ortiz (2004) – 19

== See also ==
- List of Major League Baseball runs batted in records
