= Eugenio Suárez =

Venezuelan baseball player (born 1991)

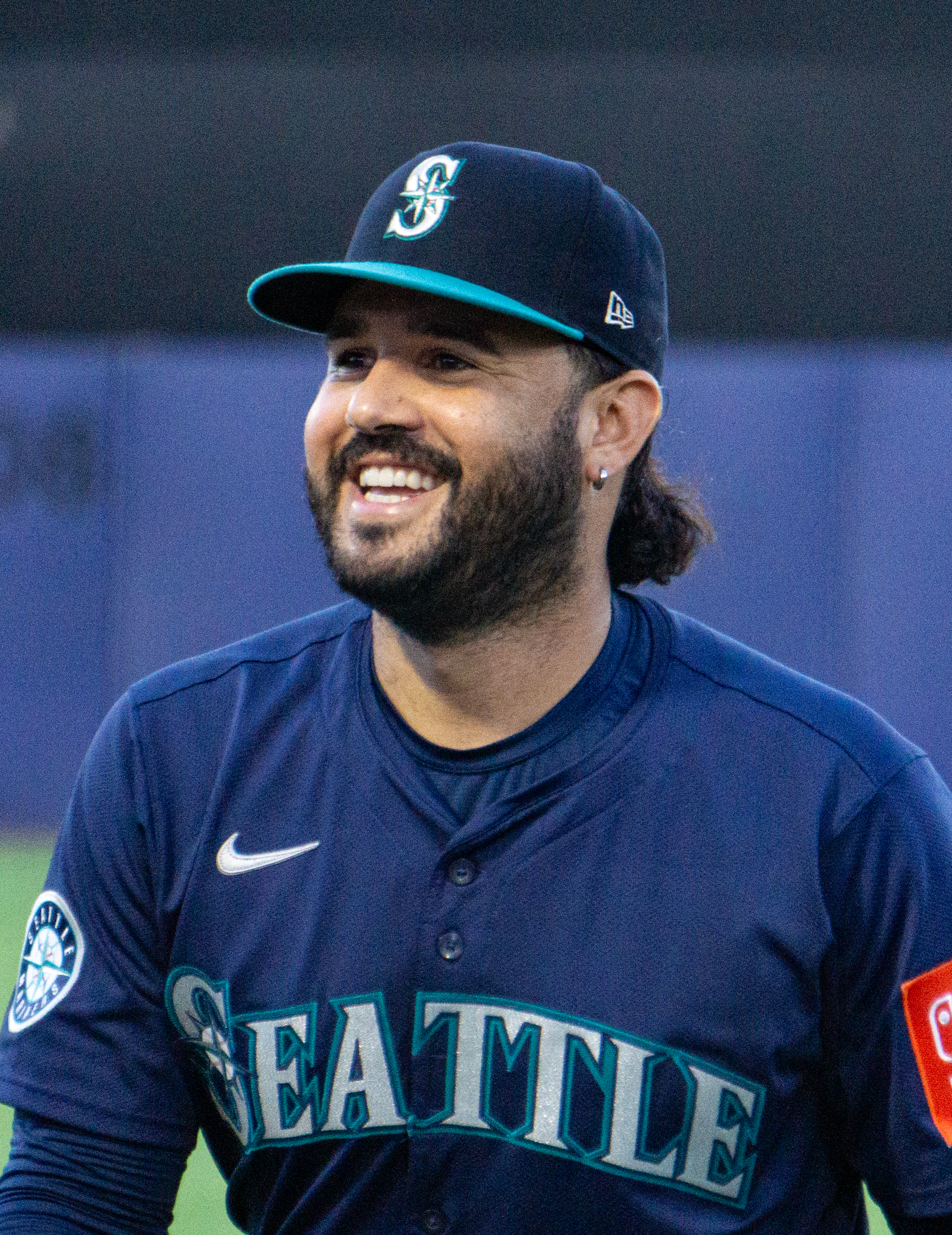
- Suárez with the Seattle Mariners in 2025

Free agent
- Third baseman
- Born: July 18, 1991 (age 35); Puerto Ordaz, Bolívar, Venezuela
- Bats: Right Throws: Right

MLB debut
- June 4, 2014, for the Detroit Tigers

MLB statistics (through 2026 season)
- Batting average: .244
- Home runs: 351
- Runs batted in: 1,023
- Stats at Baseball Reference

Teams
- Detroit Tigers (2014); Cincinnati Reds (2015–2021); Seattle Mariners (2022–2023); Arizona Diamondbacks (2024–2025); Seattle Mariners (2025); Cincinnati Reds (2026)

Career highlights and awards
- 2× All-Star (2018, 2025); Hit four home runs in one game on April 26, 2025
Medals
Men's baseball
Representing Venezuela
World Baseball Classic
Gold medal – first place	2026 Miami	Team

Eugenio Alejandro Suárez (born July 18, 1991) is a Venezuelan and American professional baseball third baseman who is a free agent. He has played in Major League Baseball (MLB) for the Detroit Tigers, Seattle Mariners, Arizona Diamondbacks, and Cincinnati Reds. He is a two-time All-Star. He hit 49 home runs, most for a Venezuelan-born player, in both 2019 and 2025.

Suárez signed with the Tigers as an amateur free agent in 2008 and made his MLB debut with the team in 2014. He was traded to the Reds following the 2014 season. The Reds signed him to a seven-year contract extension in 2018, then traded him to the Mariners in 2022. After two seasons, Seattle traded him to the Diamondbacks. On April 26, 2025, Suárez became the 19th player in MLB history to hit four home runs in one game. Arizona traded him back to Seattle in July 2025, and he signed with the Reds for the 2026 season.

== Career ==
=== Detroit Tigers ===
Suárez signed with the Detroit Tigers as an amateur free agent on October 9, 2008. He played for the Venezuelan Summer League Tigers in 2009 and 2010. He played for the Gulf Coast Tigers of the Rookie-level Gulf Coast League and the Connecticut Tigers of the Low–A New York–Penn League in 2011 and the West Michigan Whitecaps of the Single–A Midwest League in 2012. With the Whitecaps, he had a .288 batting average and 21 stolen bases in 135 games.

Suárez started the 2013 season with the Lakeland Flying Tigers of the High–A Florida State League and was promoted to the Erie SeaWolves of the Double–A Eastern League during the season. He was added to the Tigers' 40-man roster on November 20, 2013.

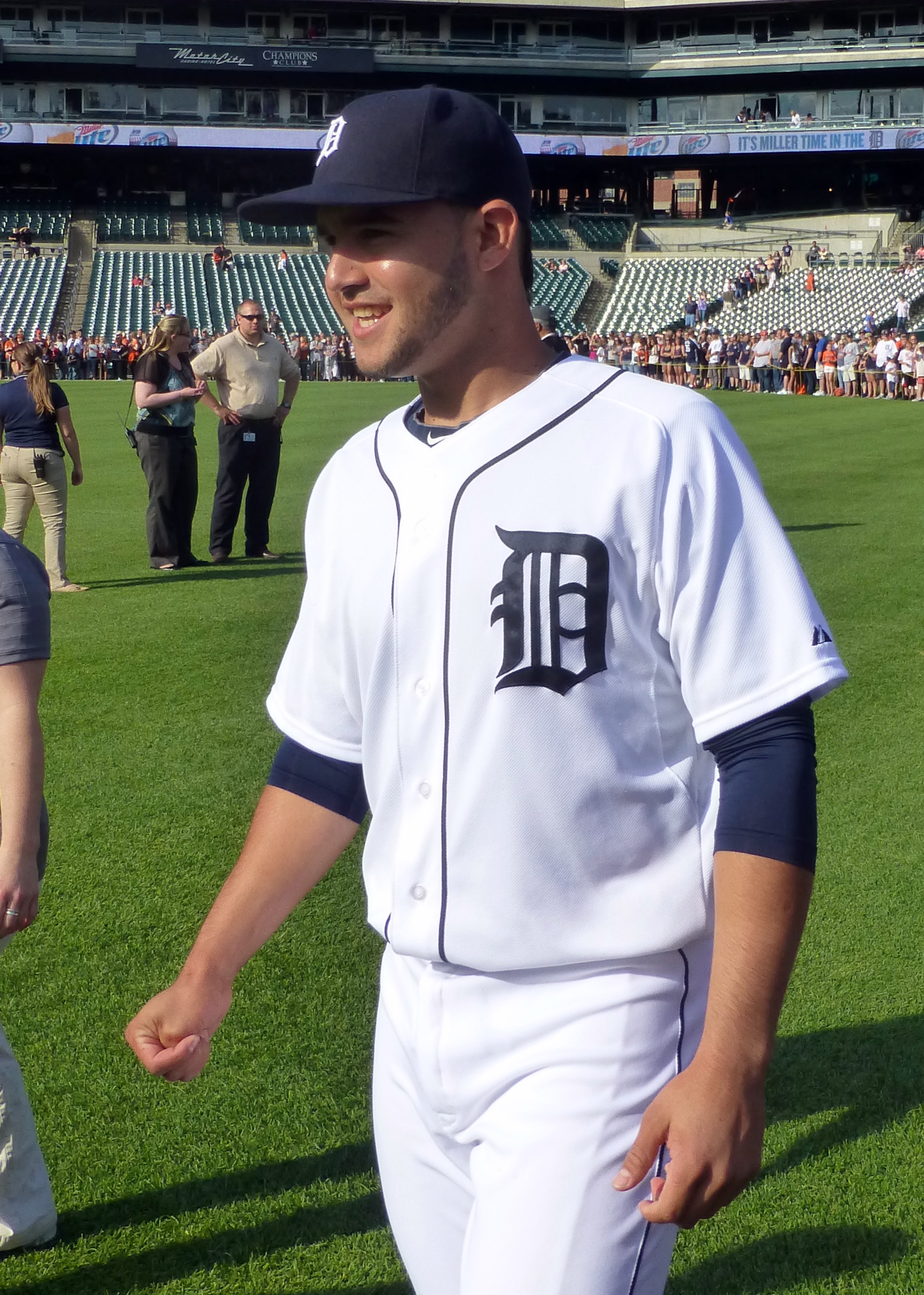
Suárez with the Detroit Tigers in 2014

Suárez began the 2014 season with Erie, and was promoted to the Toledo Mud Hens of the Triple-A International League in May. Suárez was promoted to Detroit for the first time on June 4 and entered that night's game in the seventh inning. In his first at-bat, he reached base via a fielder's choice. On June 7, Suárez made his first major league start in a game against the Boston Red Sox and recorded his first hit, a solo home run. He finished his rookie season with a .242 batting average, with 4 home runs and 23 RBIs in 85 games. He grounded out as a pinch hitter to end Game 2 of the American League Division Series (ALDS), his only appearance in his first postseason.

=== Cincinnati Reds ===
On December 11, 2014, the Tigers traded Suárez and minor league pitcher Jonathon Crawford to the Cincinnati Reds for starting pitcher Alfredo Simón. On June 11, 2015, Suárez became the Reds' regular starting shortstop after Zack Cozart's season-ending injury. He finished the 2015 season with a .284 batting average, with 13 home runs and 48 RBIs, and was second among NL shortstops in errors, with 19. After trading Todd Frazier to the Chicago White Sox, the Reds announced Suárez would be moved to third base full-time, with Cozart returning to shortstop after his injury.

In 2016, Suárez hit 21 home runs and drove in 70 runs while hitting .248 and striking out 155 times (8th in the league). On defense, he was second in the major leagues with 23 errors. In 2017, he hit 26 home runs and drove in 82 runs while batting .260.

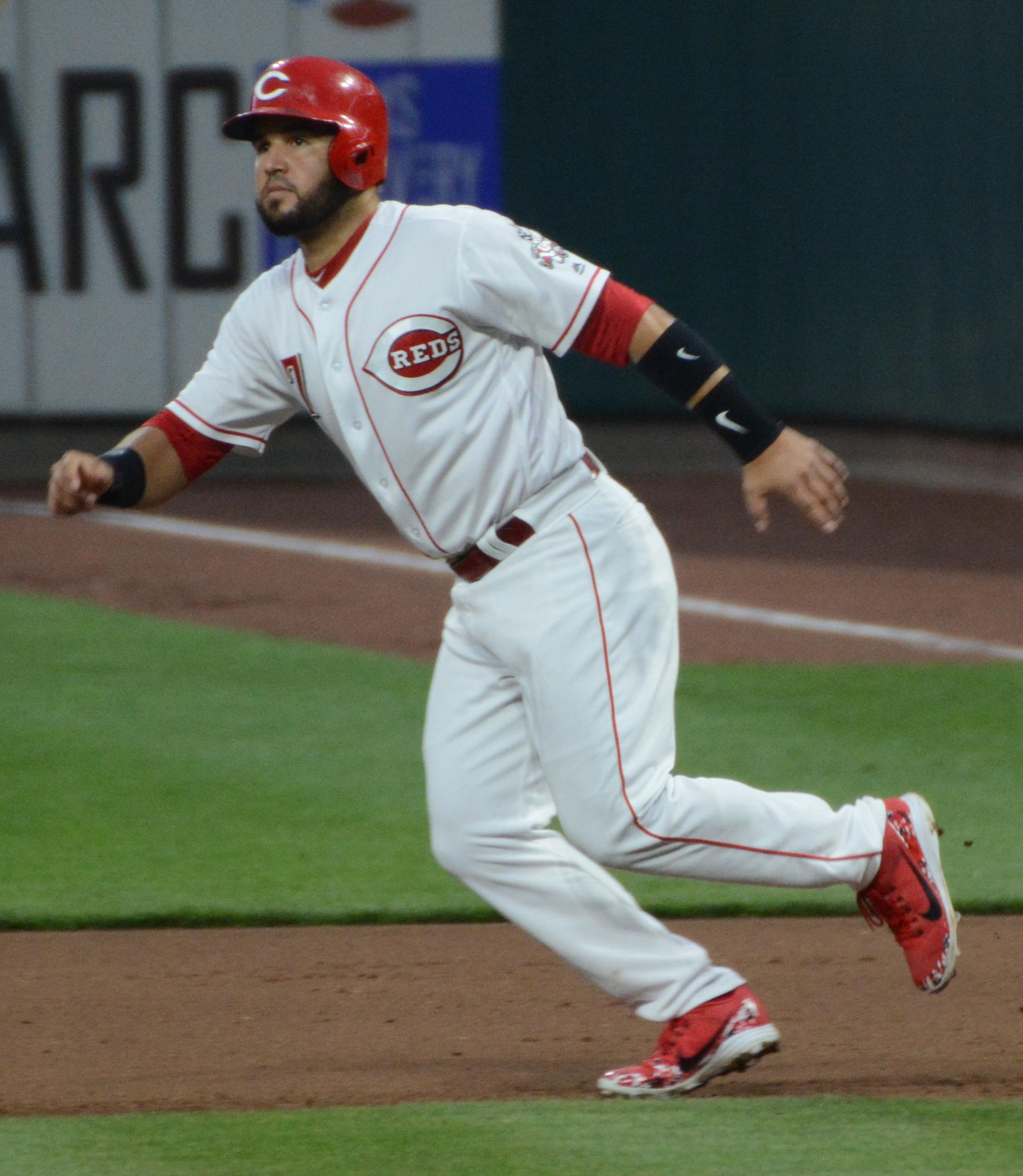
Suárez with the Reds in 2018

On March 16, 2018, Suárez signed a seven-year, $66 million contract with the Reds through the 2024 season, with a club option for 2025. Batting .315 with 19 home runs and 68 RBIs in July, he was named to his first MLB All-Star Game. Suárez finished the season leading the team with 34 home runs and 104 RBIs and leading all NL third basemen with 19 errors. He was selected to play in the 2018 MLB Japan All-Star Series that followed the season.

In 2019, Suárez played 159 games, finishing with a .271 batting average, 49 home runs (2nd in the NL), 103 RBIs (10th), and struck out an MLB-leading 189 times while leading all NL third basemen in errors, with 17. His 49 homers set new single season records for both NL third basemen and Venezuelan-born players. He led the National League (NL) in pull percentage (52%), and made contact with the lowest percentage of pitches he swung at outside the strike zone (44.2%) of all NL batters. In October 2019, Suárez was awarded the Luis Aparicio Award, which is given annually to the best Venezuelan player in MLB.

On January 28, 2020, it was reported that Suárez underwent right shoulder surgery to remove torn, loose cartilage, an injury that occurred during a swimming pool mishap at his residence in Pinecrest, Florida. He had injured his shoulder when he dove head-first into the shallow part of his home's pool and hit the bottom of the pool. During the shortened 2020 season, Suárez hit .202/.312/.470 with 15 home runs and 38 RBIs in 57 games, and was fourth among NL third basemen in errors, with five. He was 2-for-9 in two NL Wild Card Series games.

In 2021, Suárez's batting average fell to .169 through the first five months of the season. Despite a resurgence in September and October in which he batted .370, he finished the 2021 season with a .198 average and 171 strikeouts (third in the league). He also recorded 31 home runs and 79 RBIs. On defense, he was in the bottom 2% of major leaguers in outs above average.

=== Seattle Mariners ===
On March 14, 2022, the Reds traded Suárez and Jesse Winker to the Seattle Mariners in exchange for Justin Dunn, Jake Fraley, Brandon Williamson, and a player to be named later, later announced to be Connor Phillips. The transaction was a cost-cutting measure that saved the Reds just under $36 million but was unpopular with Reds fans. On July 8, he hit his first career walk-off home run in a 5–2 extra-innings win over the Toronto Blue Jays. On September 7, he recorded his 1,000th career hit with a 2-run home run off Chicago White Sox pitcher Michael Kopech. On September 11, Suárez homered twice in an 8–7 win over the Atlanta Braves, helping to atone for a blown 4-run lead in the top of the 9th by taking Kenley Jansen deep for a walk-off solo shot. In 2022, he batted .236/.332/.459 with a league-leading 196 strikeouts and 10 errors, fourth among AL third basemen. He was 7-for-20 in the postseason, hitting a home run in Game 1 of the ALDS.

In 2023, he played in all 162 games for Seattle and batted .232/.323/.391 leading the league with 214 strikeouts and 11 sacrifice flies.

=== Arizona Diamondbacks ===
On November 22, 2023, the Mariners traded Suárez to the Arizona Diamondbacks for reliever Carlos Vargas and catcher Seby Zavala. Mariners general manager Jerry Dipoto later said the trade was part of an effort to reduce the Mariners payroll.

In his first year with the Diamondbacks in 2024, he played in 158 games and batted .256/.319/.469 with a league-leading 11 sacrifice flies, along with 30 home runs and 101 RBI. In November, the Diamondbacks exercised Suárez's $15 million option for the 2025 season.

On March 31, 2025, Suárez was named the NL Player of the Week for the first week of the season after going 4-for-17 (.235) and slugging 1.143 with four home runs and seven RBI in that period including four home runs in the first three games of the season in a four-game home series against the Chicago Cubs. On April 26, Suárez became the 19th player in MLB history to hit four home runs in a single game, doing so versus the Atlanta Braves. He became the second player in MLB history, along with Carlos Delgado, to hit four home runs in only four plate appearances in a game. He was also the third player to achieve the feat in a game that his team ultimately lost. On April 28, Suárez was again named the NL Player of the Week, co-winning with Andy Pages for the fifth week of the season after going 8-for-20 (.400) and slugging 1.050 with four home runs and five RBI in that period including his four home run game. On June 1, Suárez hit a 466-foot 2-run home run off pitcher Mitchell Parker in a 3–1 victory over the Washington Nationals. That home run was the farthest hit ball by a Diamondbacks player since Christian Walker blasted a 467-foot shot in April 2022 against Tylor Megill of the New York Mets. It was also the longest home run Suárez has hit in the Statcast Era (since 2015). On June 20, Suárez went 4-for-6 with two home runs and three RBI performance against the Colorado Rockies. With his performance, Suárez became the 12th active player to reach 300 career home runs, slugging Nos. 299 and 300. He also become the third Venezuelan-born player to reach 300. On June 23, Suárez was named the NL Player of the Week for June 16–22, a span in which he batted .440 (11-for-25) with five runs, four home runs, 10 RBI, and an OPS of 1.464. He played in his second All-Star Game in July. On July 21, Suárez was named the NL Player of the Week for July 14–20, a span in which he batted 5-for-10) with five runs, four home runs, seven RBI, and an OPS of 2.283. He became the third player to win four Player of the Week awards in a season, joining J. D. Martinez (2017) and Shohei Ohtani (2024). In 107 games for the Diamondbacks in 2025, Suárez batted .248/.320/.575 with 36 home runs and 87 RBI.

=== Seattle Mariners (second stint) ===
On July 31, 2025, the Diamondbacks traded Suárez to the Seattle Mariners in exchange for Juan Burgos, Tyler Locklear, and Hunter Cranton. Suárez hit his 49th home run of the season on September 25, matching his career high as the Mariners clinched the American League (AL) West title. With Seattle, Suárez batted .189/.255/.428 in 53 games. He reached a new single-season career high with 118 RBI.

In Game Five of the AL Championship Series, he helped the Mariners take a 3–2 series lead with two home runs, including a grand slam. The Mariners lost the series to the Toronto Blue Jays in seven games.

=== Cincinnati Reds (second stint) ===
On February 3, 2026, Suárez signed a one-year, $15 million contract with the Cincinnati Reds. The contract contains a $16 million mutual option for the 2027 season. On August 27, the Reds placed Suárez on waivers. To that date, he posted a .703 OPS and missed almost a month of the season due to an oblique injury. He was not claimed by another team and remained with the Reds. On October 31, the Reds declined their mutual option on Suárez making him a free agent.

== International career ==
In the 2026 World Baseball Classic championship, Suárez drove in the go-ahead run with an RBI double in the top of the 9th inning. He was later inducted into the Venezuelan Baseball Hall of Fame as a member of the 2026 WBC championship team.

== Personal life ==
Suárez and his wife have two daughters. They reside in Pinecrest, Florida, a suburb of Miami. Suárez became a naturalized United States citizen on September 2, 2026.

== See also ==
- List of Major League Baseball players from Venezuela
- List of Major League Baseball career hit by pitch leaders
- List of Major League Baseball career home run leaders
- List of Major League Baseball single-game home run leaders

Awards and achievements
Preceded by J. D. Martinez	Batters with four home runs in one game April 26, 2025	Succeeded by Nick Kurtz
