= List of Major League Baseball single-game home run leaders =

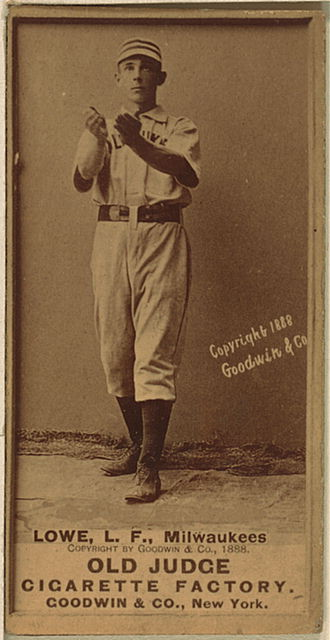
Bobby Lowe was the first MLB player to hit four home runs in a single game, doing so in 1894.

In baseball, a home run occurs when the ball is hit in such a way that the batter is able to circle the bases and reach home safely in one play without any errors being committed by the defensive team in the process. In modern baseball the feat is typically achieved by hitting the ball over the outfield fence between the foul poles (or making contact with either foul pole) without first touching the ground, resulting in an automatic home run. There is also the "inside-the-park" home run where the batter reaches home safely while the baseball is in play on the field.

Twenty-one players have hit four home runs in a single Major League Baseball (MLB) game, which writers of Sporting News described as "baseball's greatest single-game accomplishment". The most recent to accomplish the feat to date is Kyle Schwarber with the Philadelphia Phillies against the Atlanta Braves on August 28, 2025. No player has done this more than once in his career. In the pre-professional era, Lipman Pike also hit five home runs in 1866. No player has ever hit four home runs in a postseason game; that record is three, first accomplished by Babe Ruth in Game 4 of the 1926 World Series.

Bobby Lowe was the first to hit four home runs in a single game, doing so on May 30, 1894, for the Boston Beaneaters. Fans were reportedly so excited that they threw $160 in silver coins ($6,000 today) onto the field after his fourth home run. Of all players to achieve the feat, Lowe hit the fewest career home runs, with a total of 71, making his four homers 5.6% of his career total. Two years after Lowe's feat, Ed Delahanty of the Philadelphia Phillies became the second player to hit four home runs in a game. Three other Phillies players have achieved the feat, Chuck Klein in 1936, Mike Schmidt in 1976, and Kyle Schwarber in 2025. Three other current franchises, the Atlanta Braves (with three), the Los Angeles Dodgers (with two), and the Arizona Diamondbacks (with two) have had multiple four-homer games in their history; the former two share the distinction of having one four-homer game in each city they have called home (for the Braves, Boston, Milwaukee, and Atlanta; for the Dodgers, Brooklyn and Los Angeles). The Braves also hold the record for most four-homer games surrendered by a single franchise with four, while the Baltimore Orioles, Chicago Cubs, Cincinnati Reds, and Athletics have each surrendered two such games over their histories. Fourteen of the 30 franchises (as of 2025) have achieved at least one four-homer game, and thirteen franchises have surrendered at least one. Ten have never been involved in a four-homer game at all, although only three of these (Boston Red Sox, Detroit Tigers, Minnesota Twins) date back to before the 1960s expansion era.

Despite Delahanty's achievement on July 13, 1896, the Phillies lost to the Chicago Colts, one of only three occasions when a player hit four home runs but was on the losing team. One took place in 1986, when Bob Horner had four home runs for the Atlanta Braves but the Montreal Expos emerged victorious, and the other occurred in 2025, when Eugenio Suárez hit four home runs for the Arizona Diamondbacks but the Braves won the game. Following Delahanty's four-home run game in 1896, no other player would accomplish the feat for nearly 36 years, the longest gap between such occurrences. The shortest interval took place in 2002, when Mike Cameron hit his four on May 2, 2002, and Shawn Green repeated the feat 21 days later, on May 23. This was the first time two players had achieved a four-homer game in the same season; this would occur again in 2017 when Scooter Gennett and J. D. Martinez achieved the feat in June and September respectively. 2025 was the first season to see three four-home run games: by Suárez, Nick Kurtz, and Schwarber. Cameron was also the first, and to date only, player to hit four solo home runs in one game, accounting for the minimum of four RBIs when accomplishing the feat. When Martinez struck his four home runs for the Arizona Diamondbacks against the Los Angeles Dodgers, he became the first, and to date only, player with a four-homer game to hit more homers than his opponents gained base hits.

These games have resulted in other MLB single-game records due to the extreme offensive performance. Mark Whiten tied Jim Bottomley for the most runs batted in in a single game with 12 in his four-homer game. Shawn Green in 2002 and Nick Kurtz in 2025 each hit a double and a single along with their four home runs for 19 total bases, an MLB record. The previous record was Joe Adcock's mark of 18, which also came from a four-homer game. Carlos Delgado and Eugenio Suárez are the only players to make four plate appearances in a game and hit a home run each time. Warren Spahn pitched the ball which Gil Hodges hit for the first of his four, the only Hall of Fame pitcher faced during a four-home-run game.

As of 2025, of the 21 players who have hit four home runs in a game, 14 players have been eligible for the Hall of Fame, and six have been elected. Players are eligible for the Hall of Fame if they have played in at least 10 major league seasons and have either been retired for five seasons or deceased for at least six months. These requirements exclude three players actively playing for a major league team, one player ineligible who is living and has played in the past five seasons (Martinez), and three (Seerey, Hamilton, and Gennett) who did not play 10 seasons in MLB.

== Players ==
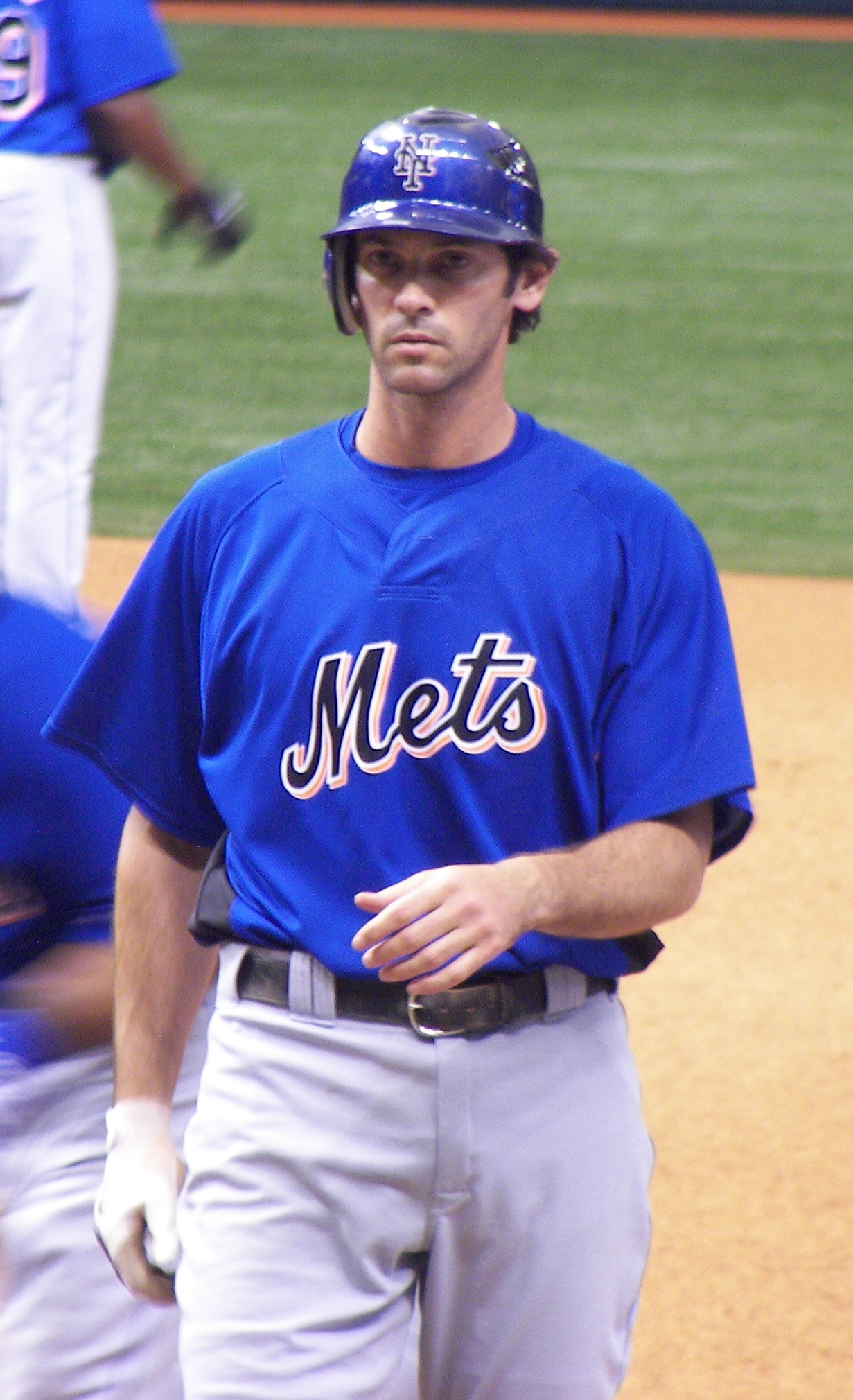
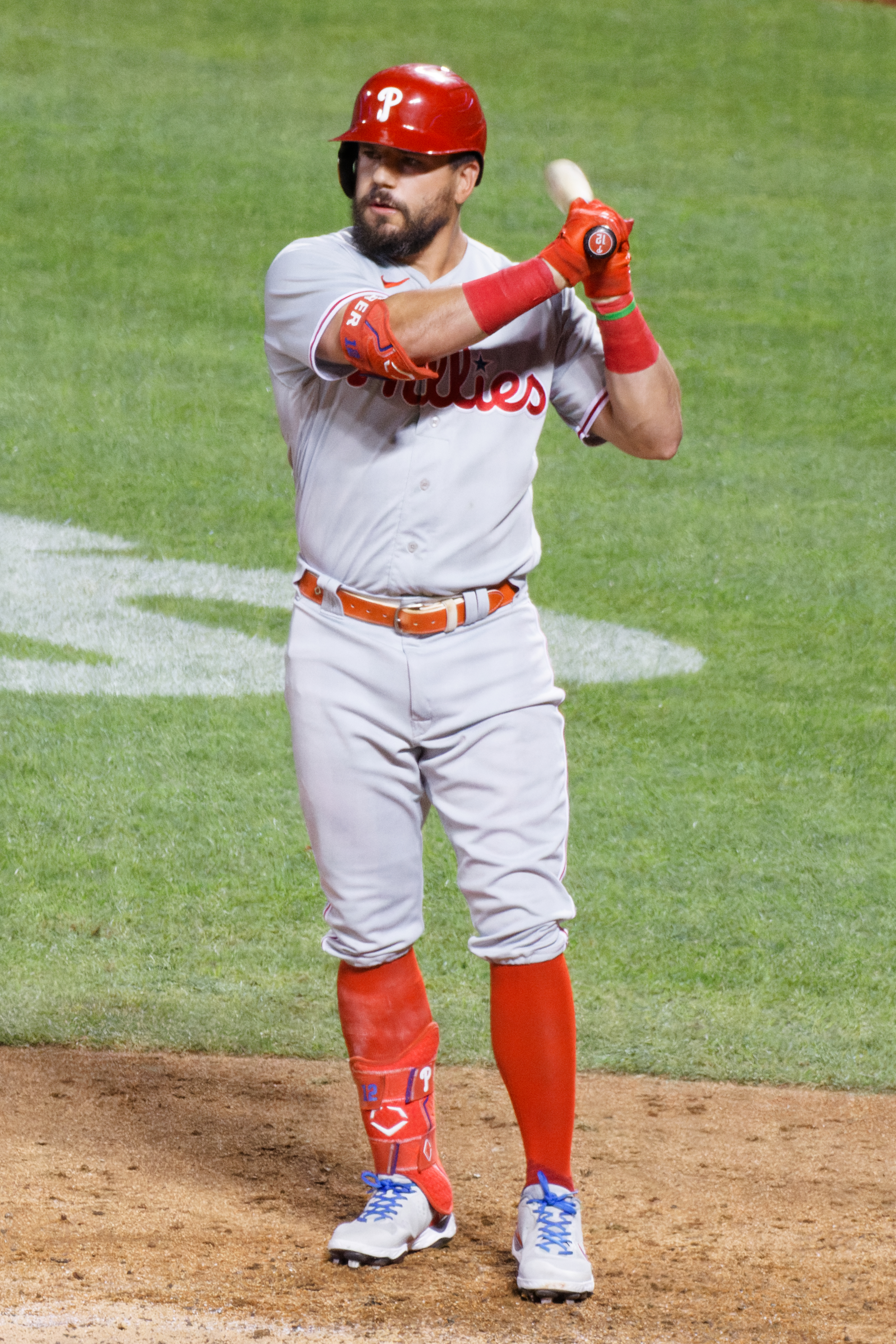
Shawn Green (left) was one of two players to hit four home runs in a game in May 2002. Green and Nick Kurtz (not pictured) also both hit a double and a single in their games for 19 total bases, an MLB record. Kyle Schwarber (right) is the most recent MLB player to hit four home runs in a game.

Player	Name
Date	Date of the game
Team	The player's team at the time
Opposing team	The team against whom the player hit four home runs
Score	Final score of the game, with the player's team's score listed first
RBI	The number of runs batted in the player had in the game
TB	The number of total bases the player had in the game
Career HR	The number of home runs the player hit in his MLB career
^{º}	The home runs were in consecutive plate appearances
†	Elected to the Baseball Hall of Fame
^{^}	MLB record
*	The player is still active.
‡	The player's team lost the game.

Players who have hit four home runs in a single regular-season game
#	Player	Date	Team		Opposing team	Score	RBI	TB	Career HR	Ref(s)
1	Bobby Lowe^{º}	May 30, 1894	Boston Beaneaters		Cincinnati Reds	20–11	9	17	71	
2	Ed Delahanty†	July 13, 1896	Philadelphia Phillies	@	Chicago Colts	8–9‡	7	17	101	
3	Lou Gehrig^{º}†	June 3, 1932	New York Yankees	@	Philadelphia Athletics	20–13	6	16	493	
4	Chuck Klein†	July 10, 1936	Philadelphia Phillies	@	Pittsburgh Pirates	9–6	6	16	300	
5	Pat Seerey	July 18, 1948	Chicago White Sox	@	Philadelphia Athletics	12–11	7	16	86	
6	Gil Hodges†	August 31, 1950	Brooklyn Dodgers		Boston Braves	19–3	9	17	370	
7	Joe Adcock	July 31, 1954	Milwaukee Braves	@	Brooklyn Dodgers	15–7	7	18	336	
8	Rocky Colavito^{º}	June 10, 1959	Cleveland Indians	@	Baltimore Orioles	11–8	6	16	374	
9	Willie Mays†	April 30, 1961	San Francisco Giants	@	Milwaukee Braves	14–4	8	16	660	
10	Mike Schmidt^{º}†	April 17, 1976	Philadelphia Phillies	@	Chicago Cubs	18–16	8	17	548	
11	Bob Horner	July 6, 1986	Atlanta Braves		Montreal Expos	8–11‡	6	16	218	
12	Mark Whiten	September 7, 1993	St. Louis Cardinals	@	Cincinnati Reds	15–2	12^	16	105	
13	Mike Cameron^{º}	May 2, 2002	Seattle Mariners	@	Chicago White Sox	15–4	4	16	278	
14	Shawn Green	May 23, 2002	Los Angeles Dodgers	@	Milwaukee Brewers	16–3	7	19^{^}	328	
15	Carlos Delgado^{º}	September 25, 2003	Toronto Blue Jays		Tampa Bay Devil Rays	10–8	6	16	473	
16	Josh Hamilton	May 8, 2012	Texas Rangers	@	Baltimore Orioles	10-3	8	18	200	
17	Scooter Gennett^{º}	June 6, 2017	Cincinnati Reds		St. Louis Cardinals	13–1	10	17	87	
18	J. D. Martinez^{º}	September 4, 2017	Arizona Diamondbacks	@	Los Angeles Dodgers	13–0	6	16	331	
19	Eugenio Suárez^{º*}	April 26, 2025	Arizona Diamondbacks		Atlanta Braves	7–8‡	5	16	325	
20	Nick Kurtz^{*}	July 25, 2025	Athletics	@	Houston Astros	15–3	8	19^{^}	36	
21	Kyle Schwarber^{*}	August 28, 2025	Philadelphia Phillies		Atlanta Braves	19–4	9	16	340	

=== Unofficial four-home run games ===
Only one player has ever hit four home runs in a spring training game: Henry Rodriguez of the Los Angeles Dodgers against the New York Mets on April 24, 1995.
