= Tristan Peters =

Canadian baseball player (born 2000)

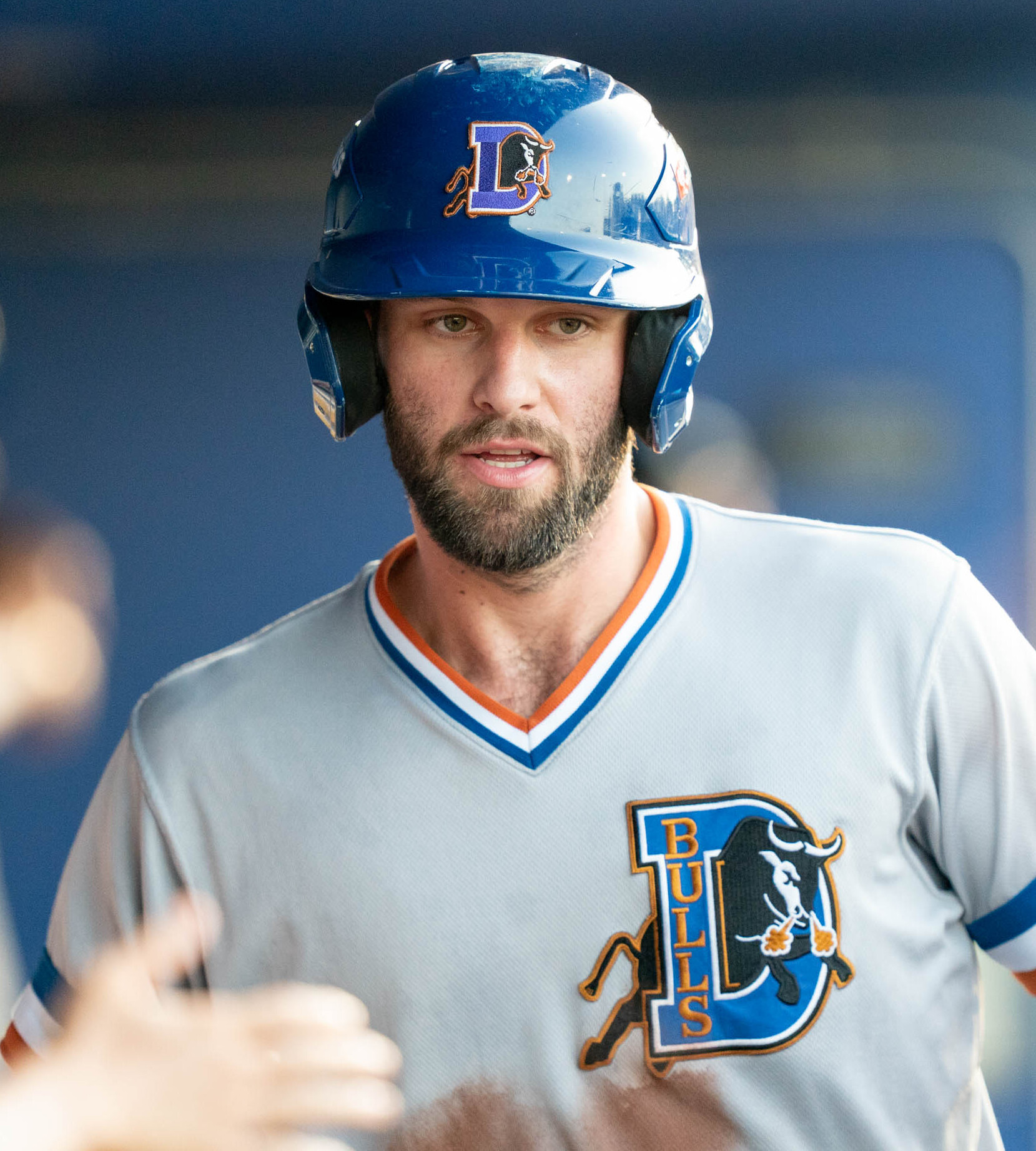
- Peters with the Durham Bulls in 2025

Chicago White Sox – No. 29
- Outfielder
- Born: February 29, 2000 (age 26); Winkler, Manitoba, Canada
- Bats: Left Throws: Right

MLB debut
- August 8, 2025, for the Tampa Bay Rays

MLB statistics (through 2026 season)
- Batting average: .258
- Home runs: 12
- Runs batted in: 56
- Stats at Baseball Reference

Teams
- Tampa Bay Rays (2025); Chicago White Sox (2026–present)

Career highlights and awards
- All-Star (2026)

Tristan Dimitri Peters (born February 29, 2000) is a Canadian professional baseball outfielder for the Chicago White Sox of Major League Baseball (MLB). He has previously played in MLB for the Tampa Bay Rays. Peters was named to his first All-Star game in 2026.

== Amateur career ==
Peters attended Foothills Composite High School in Okotoks, Alberta. He played college baseball at Chandler-Gilbert Community College and Southern Illinois University. He earned a NJCAA Gold Glove in 2019. He played for the collegiate summer league Okotoks Dawgs in 2019. He hit .396 with 12 home runs and 44 RBI that summer and earned Playoff MVP recognition while leading the Dawgs to their first title in 10 seasons. He played for the Savannah Bananas in the summer of 2021.

== Professional career ==
=== Milwaukee Brewers ===
The Milwaukee Brewers selected Peters in the seventh round (207th overall) of the 2021 Major League Baseball draft. He made his debut with affiliated baseball with the rookie-level Arizona Complex League Brewers and started 2022 with the High-A Wisconsin Timber Rattlers, for whom he batted to a .306/.386/.485 slash line in 330 at-bats with eight triples and seven home runs.

=== San Francisco Giants ===
On August 2, 2022, the Brewers traded Peters to the San Francisco Giants for pitcher Trevor Rosenthal. In 34 games for the Double-A Richmond Flying Squirrels, he batted .212/.302/.303 in 132 at-bats.

=== Tampa Bay Rays ===
On November 15, 2022, Peters was traded to the Tampa Bay Rays for infielder Brett Wisely. He spent the 2023 season with the Double-A Montgomery Biscuits, playing in 93 games and hitting .275/.361/.421 with seven home runs, 46 RBI, and 14 stolen bases. Peters made 123 appearances for the Triple-A Durham Bulls during the 2024 season, batting .238/.344/.402 with 12 home runs, 46 RBI, and eight stolen bases.

Peters made 105 appearances for Triple-A Durham in 2025, slashing .282/.370/.453 with 11 home runs, 58 RBI, and 11 stolen bases. On August 8, Peters was selected to the 40-man roster and promoted to the major leagues for the first time. He played in four games for the Rays, going 0-for-12 with seven strikeouts. He was designated for assignment by Tampa Bay on December 16.

=== Chicago White Sox ===
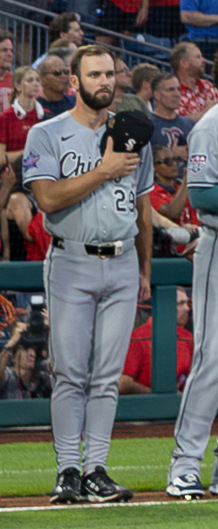
Peters was named to the MLB All-Star Game in 2026.

On December 18, 2025, Peters was traded to the Chicago White Sox in exchange for cash or a player to be named later. He recorded his first MLB hit on March 28, 2026, a double off Chad Patrick of the Milwaukee Brewers. Peters hit his first MLB home run on May 17, a three-run shot off Phil Maton of the Chicago Cubs during the eighth inning of a 9–8 White Sox win in 10 innings. On June 26, Peters hit his first career grand slam, off John Schreiber of the Kansas City Royals, in a 22–1 win. On July 10, Peters hit for the cycle against the Athletics in a 14–1 win. On July 11, he was named an American League All-Star for the 2026 Major League Baseball All-Star Game, replacing Nick Kurtz. From August 22 to August 26, Peters homered in five straight games, tying a franchise record and MLB rookie record for consecutive games with a home run.

== Personal life ==
Peters is married and has a daughter. He met his wife, Erin, on the Arizona line dancing circuit.

== See also ==
- List of Major League Baseball players to hit for the cycle

Achievements
Preceded by Chase DeLauter	American League Rookie of the Month; August 2026	Succeeded by Carter Jensen
Preceded by Bryce Harper	Hitting for the cycle July 10, 2026	Succeeded by JJ Bleday
