= 2026 Major League Baseball All-Star Game =

	1	2	3	4	5	6	7	8	9	R	H	E
American League	3	0	0	0	0	0	0	1	0	4	7	0
National League	0	0	0	0	0	0	0	0	0	0	3	0
- Date: July 14, 2026
- Venue: Citizens Bank Park
- City: Philadelphia, Pennsylvania
- Managers: John Schneider (TOR); Dave Roberts (LAD)
- MVP: Cody Bellinger (NYY)
- Attendance: 43,916
- Television: Fox (U.S.); Sportsnet (Canada, simulcast on MLB International); TNT Sports 1 (United Kingdom, simulcast on MLB International); NHK BS (Japan)
- TV announcers: Joe Davis, John Smoltz, Ken Rosenthal, and Tom Verducci (Fox); Matt Vasgersian and Yonder Alonso (Sportsnet/MLB International); So Taguchi and Shuhei Takagi (NHK BS)
- Radio: ESPN
- Radio announcers: Karl Ravech, Doug Glanville, Buster Olney, and Tim Kurkjian

The 2026 Major League Baseball All-Star Game was the 96th Major League Baseball All-Star Game played between the American League (AL) and the National League (NL) of Major League Baseball. The game was played on July 14, 2026. The game was televised nationally by Fox. The game was hosted by the Philadelphia Phillies at Citizens Bank Park in Philadelphia, Pennsylvania. The site was chosen in commemoration of the signing of the United States Declaration of Independence in the city on July 4, 1776.

The American League beat the National League 4–0, marking it the first shutout in an All-Star game since Citi Field in 2013. Cody Bellinger of the New York Yankees, who drove in two runs in the first inning, won the MLB All-Star Game Most Valuable Player Award.

== Background ==
=== Host selection ===
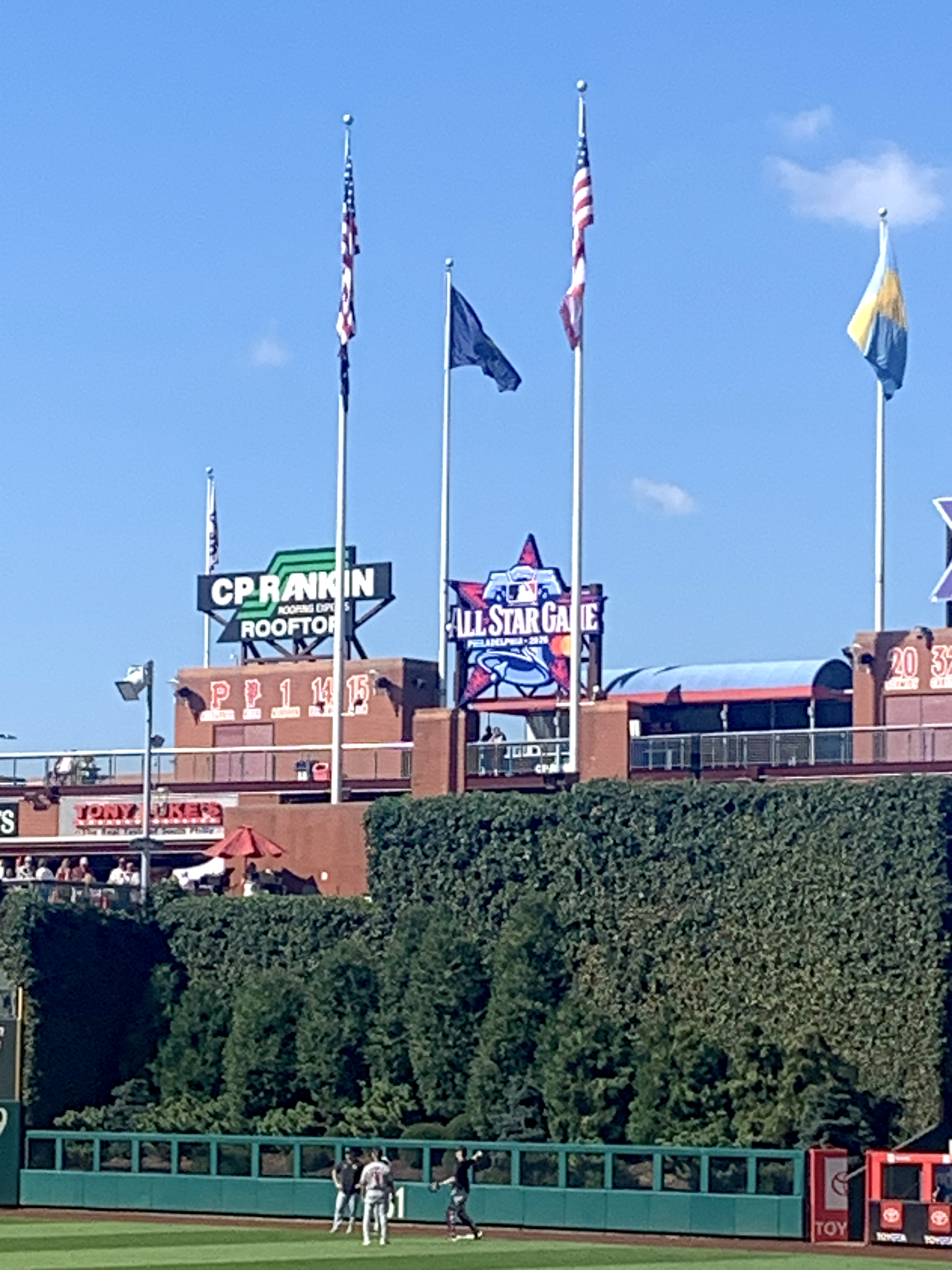
2026 MLB All-Star Game logo above centerfield in Citizens Bank Park in Philadelphia (September 2025)

The Philadelphia Phillies were awarded the game on April 16, 2019. This was the fourth time that the Phillies will host an All-Star Game, but the first since moving to Citizens Bank Park in 2004; the previous games were in 1952 at Shibe Park and in 1976 and 1996 at Veterans Stadium. The Philadelphia Athletics had also hosted the All-Star Game at Shibe Park, in 1943.

The All-Star Game logo was unveiled on July 18, 2025, prior to the Phillies' home game against the Los Angeles Angels, with the presence of the Philadelphia City Council, Phillies executives and former Phillies players. The logo features the Liberty Bell with the MLB Batter logo on top and the host city and year on the bottom.

=== Roster selections ===
The starting rosters for each league's position players plus designated hitter (DH) were determined by fan balloting, which was conducted in two phases. Since 2022, the first-phase top vote-getter for each league automatically received a spot in the starting lineup. The top two vote-getters for every other non-pitching position and DH advanced to the second phase of voting. There are normally six finalists for the three outfield positions in each league, except when an outfielder is the top vote-getter, in which case there are four finalists for the remaining two outfield positions. Voting does not carry over between phases.

First-phase voting was held from June 3 and ended on June 25. The top vote-getters from each league were Ernie Clement for the AL and Shohei Ohtani for the NL. The second-phase voting was from June 29 through July 2. All voting was conducted online, at MLB.com or via the MLB app.

== Rosters ==
=== American League ===
Elected starters
Position	Player	Team	All-Star Games
C	Shea Langeliers	Athletics	1
1B	Vladimir Guerrero Jr.^{#}	Blue Jays	6
2B	Ernie Clement†	Blue Jays	1
3B	Junior Caminero	Rays	2
SS	Bobby Witt Jr.	Royals	3
OF	Byron Buxton^{#}	Twins	3
OF	Aaron Judge^{#}	Yankees	8
OF	Mike Trout	Angels	12
DH	Yordan Alvarez	Astros	4

Reserves
Position	Player	Team	All-Star Games
C	Dillon Dingler	Tigers	1
C	Adley Rutschman	Orioles	3
1B	Willson Contreras^{[B]}	Red Sox	4
1B	Nick Kurtz^{[A]}^{#}	Athletics	1
1B	Munetaka Murakami^{[I]}	White Sox	1
1B	Ben Rice	Yankees	1
2B	Travis Bazzana	Guardians	1
3B	Miguel Vargas	White Sox	1
SS	Kevin McGonigle	Tigers	1
OF	Randy Arozarena	Mariners	3
OF	Cody Bellinger	Yankees	3
OF	Riley Greene	Tigers	3
OF	Tristan Peters^{[J]}	White Sox	1
OF	Ceddanne Rafaela^{[F]}	Red Sox	1
DH	Yandy Díaz	Rays	2

Pitchers
Player	Team	All-Star Games
Bryan Baker	Rays	1
Dylan Cease	Blue Jays	1
Aroldis Chapman	Red Sox	9
Jacob Latz	Rangers	1
Nick Martinez^{[G]}	Rays	1
Parker Messick	Guardians	1
Drew Rasmussen	Rays	2
Joe Ryan	Twins	2
Cam Schlittler	Yankees	1
Cade Smith	Guardians	1
Ranger Suárez^{#}	Red Sox	2
Louis Varland	Blue Jays	1
Justin Verlander‡	Tigers	10
Michael Wacha	Royals	2

=== National League ===
Elected starters
Position	Player	Team	All-Star Games
C	Drake Baldwin	Braves	1
1B	Freddie Freeman	Dodgers	10
2B	Ozzie Albies	Braves	4
3B	Max Muncy	Dodgers	3
SS	CJ Abrams	Nationals	2
OF	Brandon Marsh	Phillies	1
OF	Andy Pages	Dodgers	1
OF	Juan Soto	Mets	5
DH	Shohei Ohtani†^{#}	Dodgers	6

Reserves
Position	Player	Team	All-Star Games
C	William Contreras	Brewers	3
C	Hunter Goodman	Rockies	2
1B	Bryce Harper‡	Phillies	9
1B	Matt Olson	Braves	4
2B	Luis Arráez	Giants	4
3B	Sal Stewart	Reds	1
SS	Otto Lopez	Marlins	1
OF	Corbin Carroll	Diamondbacks	3
OF	Pete Crow-Armstrong	Cubs	2
OF	Jordan Walker	Cardinals	1
OF	James Wood	Nationals	2
DH	Iván Herrera^{[H]}	Cardinals	1
DH	Kyle Schwarber	Phillies	4

Pitchers
Player	Team	All-Star Games
Braxton Ashcraft^{[D]}^{#}	Pirates	1
Chase Burns^{#}	Reds	1
Jhoan Durán	Phillies	1
Foster Griffin^{[L]}	Nationals	1
Raisel Iglesias	Braves	1
Jesús Luzardo^{[C]}	Phillies	1
Max Meyer^{#}	Marlins	1
Mason Miller	Padres	2
Jacob Misiorowski^{#}	Brewers	2
Riley O'Brien^{[E]}	Cardinals	1
Eduardo Rodríguez	Diamondbacks	1
Chris Sale	Braves	10
Cristopher Sánchez	Phillies	2
Paul Skenes^{#}	Pirates	3
Logan Webb	Giants	3
Justin Wrobleski^{[K]}	Dodgers	1
Yoshinobu Yamamoto	Dodgers	2

† Denotes top vote-getter in each league
‡ Denotes player was a "Legend Pick" selected by the Commissioner of Baseball

==== Roster notes ====
1. Nick Kurtz was named starter in place of Vladimir Guerrero Jr. due to Guerrero electing not to play.
2. Willson Contreras was named as the roster replacement for Vladimir Guerrero Jr. due to Guerrero electing not to play.
3. Braxton Ashcraft was named as the roster replacement for Jacob Misiorowski due to injury.
4. Jesús Luzardo was named as the roster replacement for Max Meyer due to Meyer starting on Sunday.
5. Riley O'Brien was named as the roster replacement for Paul Skenes due to Skenes starting on Sunday.
6. Ceddanne Rafaela was named as the roster replacement for Aaron Judge due to injury.
7. Nick Martinez was named as the roster replacement for Ranger Suárez due to injury.
8. Iván Herrera was named as the roster replacement for Shohei Ohtani due to injury.
9. Munetaka Murakami was named as the roster replacement for Byron Buxton due to injury.
10. Tristan Peters was named as the roster replacement for Nick Kurtz due to injury.
11. Justin Wrobleski was named as the roster replacement for Chase Burns due to injury.
12. Foster Griffin was named as the roster replacement for Braxton Ashcraft due to Ashcraft electing not to pitch.

#: Indicates player would not play (replaced as per reference notes above).

== Game summary ==
=== Starting lineup ===
American League
Order	Player	Team	Position
1	Mike Trout	Angels	CF
2	Yordan Alvarez	Astros	DH
3	Shea Langeliers	Athletics	C
4	Junior Caminero	Rays	3B
5	Bobby Witt Jr.	Royals	SS
6	Cody Bellinger	Yankees	RF
7	Ben Rice	Yankees	1B
8	Riley Greene	Tigers	LF
9	Ernie Clement	Blue Jays	2B
—	Dylan Cease	Blue Jays	P

National League
Order	Player	Team	Position
1	Kyle Schwarber	Phillies	DH
2	Juan Soto	Mets	RF
3	Freddie Freeman	Dodgers	1B
4	CJ Abrams	Nationals	SS
5	Max Muncy	Dodgers	3B
6	Ozzie Albies	Braves	2B
7	Brandon Marsh	Phillies	LF
8	Andy Pages	Dodgers	CF
9	Drake Baldwin	Braves	C
—	Cristopher Sánchez	Phillies	P

=== Line score ===
July 14, 2026 8:20 pm (EDT) Citizens Bank Park in Philadelphia, Pennsylvania 88 °F (31 °C), Clear
Team	1	2	3	4	5	6	7	8	9	R	H	E
American League	3	0	0	0	0	0	0	1	0	4	7	0
National League	0	0	0	0	0	0	0	0	0	0	3	0
Starting pitchers: AL: Dylan Cease; NL: Cristopher Sánchez; WP: Dylan Cease (1–0) LP: Cristopher Sánchez (0–1); Home runs: AL: Miguel Vargas (1); NL: None; Attendance: 43,916 Time: 2:45; Umpires: HP – Alan Porter; 1B – Chris Conroy; 2B – Chad Whitson; 3B – Ryan Additon; LF – Adam Beck; RF – Edwin Moscoso; Replay Official – Vic Carapazza; Boxscore

Pop singer-songwriter Alexander Stewart sang the Canadian national anthem while legendary R&B singer and Philadelphia native Patti Labelle sang the American national anthem. R&B singer, actress, and television personality Jennifer Hudson sang "America the Beautiful" during the pre-game ceremony. Yordan Alvarez delivered the first base hit of the game at the top of the first inning. After two walks and an out, Cody Bellinger delivered a two-run RBI single to give the American League a 2–0 lead. Ben Rice later delivered an RBI and extended the lead to 3–0. With both Rice and Bellinger, this became the first time the Yankees had two players hit RBIs in an All-Star Game since 1964. During the top of the third, with a runner on first, Junior Caminero was hit in the hand by a pitch thrown by Riley O'Brien. X-ray images that were taken by doctors came back negative as announced during the bottom of the fourth. In the top of the eighth inning, Miguel Vargas hit a solo home run off Justin Wrobleski to extend the American League's lead to 4–0. Aroldis Chapman and Bryan Baker came in the ninth inning to finish the game, giving the American League a 4–0 victory and the first shutout in an All-Star Game since 2013.

Cody Bellinger of the New York Yankees was named the Major League Baseball All-Star Game Most Valuable Player, finishing the game 1–for-3 with two RBIs, and became the first Yankees Most Valuable Player since Giancarlo Stanton back in 2022. The game as a whole was dominated by pitching, with the National League striking out 15 times, with each of the pitchers on the AL team outside of Bryan Baker recording a strike out.

In the fifth inning, ten local youth baseball and softball players rode their bikes onto the field and were matched with one of the All-Stars. Fireworks were shot off and Ray Charles' version of America The Beautiful in a tribute to the move, The Sandlot and as a tribute to the United States Semiquincentennial. The tribute was widely praised as one of the best parts of the game.

== See also ==
- List of Major League Baseball All-Star Games
- All-Star Futures Game
- Home Run Derby
