= Shawn Green =

American baseball player (born 1972)

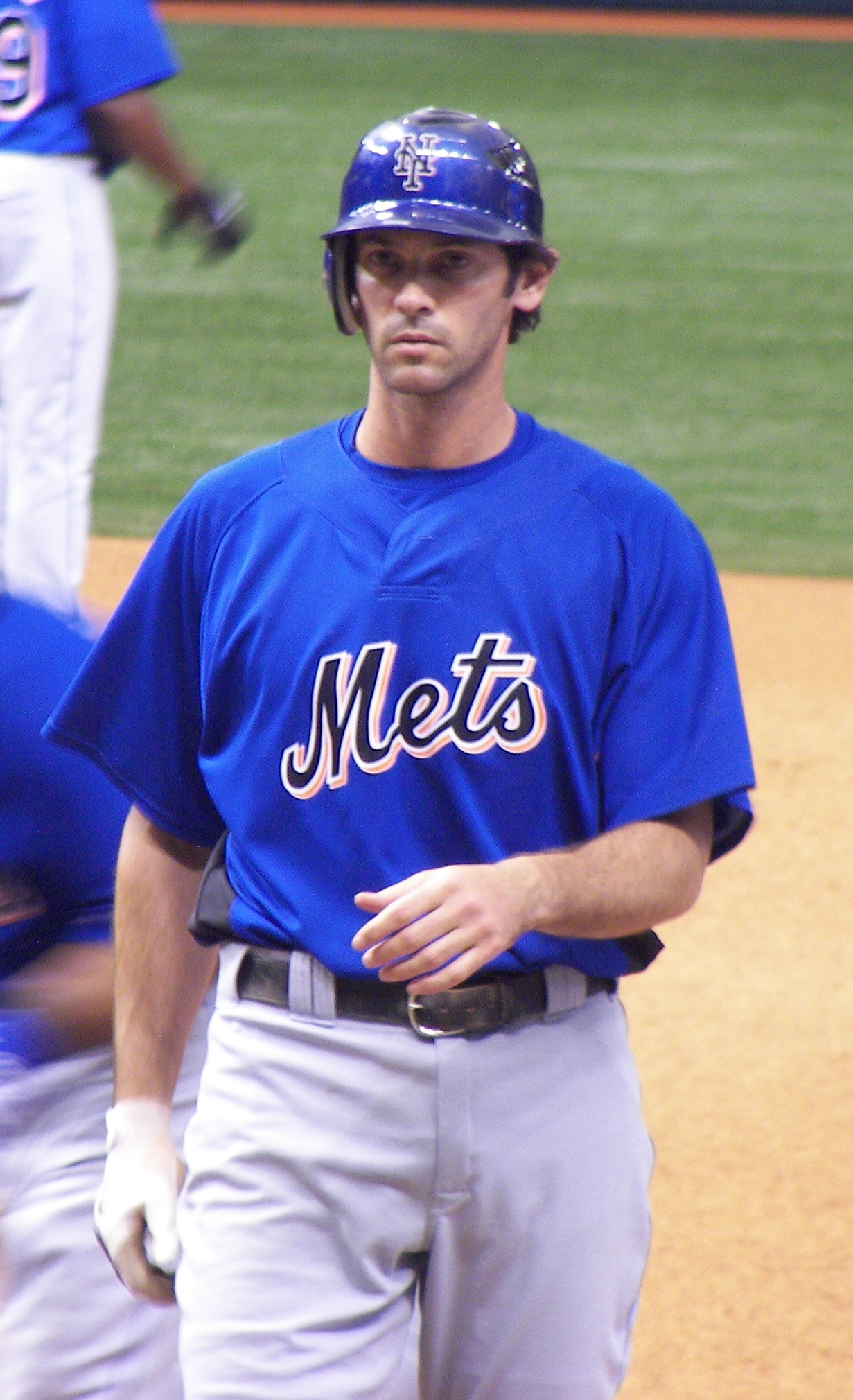
- Green with the New York Mets in 2007
- Right fielder
- Born: November 10, 1972 (age 54); Des Plaines, Illinois, U.S.
- Batted: Left Threw: Left

MLB debut
- September 28, 1993, for the Toronto Blue Jays

Last MLB appearance
- September 30, 2007, for the New York Mets

MLB statistics
- Batting average: .283
- Hits: 2,003
- Home runs: 328
- Runs batted in: 1,070
- Stats at Baseball Reference

Teams
- Toronto Blue Jays (1993–1999); Los Angeles Dodgers (2000–2004); Arizona Diamondbacks (2005–2006); New York Mets (2006–2007)

Career highlights and awards
- 2× All-Star (1999, 2002); Gold Glove Award (1999); Silver Slugger Award (1999); Hit four home runs in one game on May 23, 2002
Medals
Men's baseball
Representing United States
World Junior Baseball Championship
Bronze medal – third place	1990 Cuba	Team

Shawn David Green (born November 10, 1972) is an American former professional baseball right fielder who played for multiple teams in Major League Baseball (MLB). Green was a first-round draft pick and a two-time major league All-Star. He drove in 100 runs four times and scored 100 runs four times, hit 40 or more home runs three times, led the league in doubles, extra base hits, and total bases, won both a Gold Glove Award and a Silver Slugger Award, and set the Dodgers then single-season record in home runs. Green also set the MLB record for most total bases in a single game, with 19, on May 23, 2002 vs. the Milwaukee Brewers. Green was in the top five in the league in home runs, RBIs, intentional walks, and MVP voting multiple times throughout his career.

Besides having the most total bases in a game, Green holds or is tied for the following major league records: most home runs in a game (four), most extra base hits in a game (five), most runs scored in a game (six), most home runs in two consecutive games (five), most home runs in three consecutive games (seven), and most consecutive at bats in a game with a home run (four). Green broke the record of 18 total bases (four home runs and one double) set by Joe Adcock of the Milwaukee Braves (vs. Brooklyn Dodgers) in 1954. Athletics rookie Nick Kurtz matched Green’s 19 total bases (also four home runs, one double, and a single) against the Houston Astros on July 25, 2025.

At the time of his retirement, he was one of only fourteen players with at least 300 home runs, 1,000 runs and RBIs, 400 doubles, a .280 batting average, and 150 stolen bases; among the players in that club included Barry Bonds and George Brett.

== Early and personal life ==
Green was born in Des Plaines, Illinois, and is Jewish. His family moved to New Jersey when he was one year old, then to San Jose, California, and finally to Tustin, California, when he was 12 years old. His father, Ira, played basketball at DePaul University for the Blue Demons during the 1960s, graduating in 1966, and his mother is the former Judy Schneider.

Green was one of the best-known Jewish major league ballplayers, and the most prominent one with the New York Mets since Art Shamsky played right field for the 1969 World Series champion Mets. Of Jewish major leaguers, only Hank Greenberg, with 331 home runs and 1,276 RBIs, has more major league home runs and RBIs than Green.

Green opted to miss games on Yom Kippur, even when his team was in the middle of a playoff race.

While Green is often likened to Hank Greenberg, Green's grandfather in fact shortened the family name from Greenberg to Green, for "business reasons". Green was arguably the best Jewish baseball player since Sandy Koufax, although his stats (especially his home runs) declined in his last years. Green retired on February 28, 2008.

Green has a residence in the Orange County, California, city of Irvine. In 2002, he married Lindsay Bear in a mixed Jewish and Christian ceremony. They have two daughters.

== High school ==
He attended Tustin High School in Tustin, California, where he tied the California Interscholastic Federation record with 147 hits during his high school career. He was a first team selection to the 1991 USA Today All-USA high school team, while ranking third in his class academically.

== College and the baseball draft ==
In 1991, Green won a baseball scholarship to Stanford University, where he became a brother of the Delta Tau Delta International Fraternity.

Green was drafted by the Toronto Blue Jays as their first round pick (16th overall) in the 1991 amateur draft. The Blue Jays drafted him using a compensation pick from the San Francisco Giants, to whom they had lost Bud Black via free agency. Green ultimately struck a deal with the Blue Jays. They agreed that Green would play in the minor leagues during the summer, but go back to the university in the off-season.

Green received one of the highest signing bonuses at that time ($725,000; ($1,714,000 today)), a portion of which he donated to the Metropolitan Toronto Housing Authority Breakfast Club (which provides breakfast for kids who would otherwise go to school hungry).

== Minor league career ==
In 1992, Green played for the Dunedin Blue Jays of the Florida State League, and was selected to the league's all-star team.

Green spent most of 1993 and 1994 in the minors, where he compiled impressive numbers. In 1994, he hit .344—winning the International League batting title—while ranking third in runs, hits, and on-base percentage and hitting thirteen home runs with 61 RBIs for Toronto's AAA affiliate, the Syracuse Chiefs. He was an International League all-star, was voted the International League Rookie of the Year, and was also voted the International League's Best Batting Prospect, Best Outfield Arm, and Most Exciting Player in Baseball America's Tools of the Trade poll. In addition, he won the R. Howard Webster Award as the Chief's MVP, and was the Blue Jays' Minor League Player of the Year. Green then hit .306 in the 1994–1995 Venezuelan Winter League.

== Major league career ==
=== Toronto Blue Jays (1993–1999) ===
Green made his Major League debut on September 28 as the second-youngest player in the Major Leagues. Though he did not play in the 1993 World Series, he was awarded a World Series ring. He appeared in just seventeen games in 1993 and 1994.

In 1995, his full rookie season, Green started in 97 games, hitting fifteen home runs and batting .288. Green set Blue Jays rookie records in doubles (31), hit streak (14), extra base hits (50), and slugging percentage (.509). He came in fifth in voting for the American League Rookie of the Year.

His 1996 and 1997 seasons were similar, in that Green was given limited at-bats, wasn't trusted to hit left-handed pitching, and produced only sporadically. Green was, however, more aggressive on the base paths in 1997 than in any previous year, stealing 14 bases while being caught only three times.

In 1998, Green was granted an everyday spot in the line-up and he delivered by becoming the first Blue Jay to become a member of the 30–30 club, in which he hit over 30 home runs and stole 30 or more bases in the same season. He also became the tenth Major Leaguer to hit 35 or more home runs and steal 35 or more bases in a season, joining among others Willie Mays, Barry Bonds, and Alex Rodriguez. Green had never hit more than eighteen home runs in a season (major or minor leagues). He finished the season batting .278 with 35 home runs, 100 RBIs, and 35 stolen bases (a career best).

In 1999, Green proved his new-found power was no fluke. On April 22, he hit a 449-foot (137 m) home run into SkyDome's fifth deck, putting him in prestigious company with José Canseco, Mark McGwire, and Joe Carter. By the All-Star break, he had hit 25 home runs and knocked in 70 runs, earning him not only his first All-Star appearance, but also a chance to compete in the Home Run Derby at Fenway Park. Green hit only two home runs, however, and was eliminated in the first round. He finished the season batting .309 (a career best), with 42 home runs (5th in the league), 134 runs (2nd in the league, and a career best), 123 RBIs, and a .588 slugging percentage (fifth best in the league). Green also led the league in doubles (45), extra-base hits (87), and total bases (361). He hit a home run in every 14.6 at-bats. After the season, he was awarded a Gold Glove Award for his defense, and a Silver Slugger Award for his offense, and came in ninth in the voting for MVP.

In the off-season, Green expressed a desire to sign as a free agent with a team closer to his California roots after the 2000 season. The Blue Jays, facing the rising contract demands of Green and slugger teammate Carlos Delgado, decided not to leave the decision of which player to pursue until mid-way through the season. On November 8, 1999, Green was traded with Jorge Nuñez to the Los Angeles Dodgers for Pedro Borbón Jr. and Raúl Mondesí. Green quickly signed an extension with Los Angeles, agreeing to an $84 million ($157,000,000 today)/six-year deal that included a $4 million ($7,478,000 today) signing bonus.

=== Los Angeles Dodgers (2000–2004) ===
With a lot of pressure riding on his now well-paid shoulders, Green struggled at times in 2000, his first season with Los Angeles. Still, he led the league in games played (with 162), and was fifth in the league in doubles with 44 (the second-highest total in Dodgers history), while driving in 99 runs. He also had one of the longest consecutive games on-base streaks in baseball history, at 53; five behind Duke Snider's modern day National League (NL) record. He hit home runs in five straight games; the only other Dodgers to achieve this feat are Roy Campanella (1950), Matt Kemp (2010), Adrián González (2014–15), Joc Pederson (2015) and Shohei Ohtani (2025). He hit .329 in late innings of close games.

Green had a career year in 2001, batting .297 (.331 with runners in scoring position) with a .598 slugging percentage (a career best), 49 home runs (a career best), 121 runs (7th in the league), 125 RBIs (a career best), 370 total bases (5th in the league), and 20 stolen bases. His 49 home runs set a Dodgers single-season record (a record which stood until Shohei Ohtani hit his 50th home run of the season on September 19, 2024), but only tied for fourth in the league, behind Barry Bonds, Sammy Sosa, and Luis González. For the fourth straight year he stole 20 or more bases, and batted .331 with runners in scoring position. Green came in sixth in voting for league MVP.

"I felt like it was the right thing to do ... I didn't do this to gain approval. I thought it was the right example to set for Jewish kids, a lot of whom don't like to go to synagogue."

— Green, explaining why he sat out a game for the first time in 415 games

Green made headlines for two decisions that he made during the 2001 season. On September 26, he stood by his word and sat out a game for the first time in 415 games, to honor the most significant holiday on the Jewish calendar, Yom Kippur. He also made a second notable decision on September 26, donating his day's pay of $75,000 ($136,000 in 2025) to a charity for survivors of the New York 9/11 terrorist attacks.

Green started off slowly in 2002, but turned things around with a record-setting power display. On May 23, the turning point of his season, he had one of the best single game performances ever. He hit a Major League record-tying four home runs and a record-tying five extra-base hits (he hit a double in addition to the home runs) against the Milwaukee Brewers, and had 19 total bases, breaking Joe Adcock's 1954 Major League record by one, while matching the major league record of six runs scored in one game. This record has since been matched by Nick Kurtz in 2025. No other major league player had six hits, five runs, and as many as four extra-base hits in a game again until Ian Kinsler of the Texas Rangers in 2009. He hit a fifth home run during the following game to tie the Major League two-game home run record (five), and then hit two more the game after to break the Major League three-game record (seven). Green also broke the NL record with nine home runs in that calendar week. He was voted to the All-Star team, and finished the season with a .285 average, .385 On-base percentage (a career best), 42 home runs (third in the league), 114 RBIs (fourth in the league), 114 runs (fourth in the league), 93 walks (a career best), 22 intentional walks (fifth in the league), and 20 stolen bases. He hit .333 with runners in scoring position and two out. Green came in 5th in voting for league MVP.

In 2003, Green struggled with his power and RBI production. He had problems with tendinitis in his left shoulder, which limited him to a 19 home runs and 85 RBIs as he batted .280. Still, he was second in the league in doubles (with 49; a career best).

Green's power improved in 2004, as he hit 28 home runs and collected 86 RBIs, while batting .266, leading the Dodgers to the 2004 playoffs. Green moved to first base for much of the season. He hit three home runs in the post-season, in just 16 at bats.

Green was traded to the Arizona Diamondbacks on January 11, 2005. He waived his no-trade clause for a three-year extension from the team for $32 million. The trade was part of a three-team trade which sent Green and cash to the Diamondbacks, in exchange for catcher Dioner Navarro and three minor leaguers.

=== Arizona Diamondbacks (2005–06) ===
While Green's batting average in 2005 (.286) was his best in four years, he walked fewer times (62) than he had in the prior six years, and hit fewer home runs (22) and scored fewer runs (87) than he had in all but seven of his prior seasons. Green came to bat 398 times with the Diamondbacks before being traded in 2006, and while his batting average and on-base percentage were near his career averages, his slugging percentage (.425) was the lowest it had been since he broke into the Majors.

On August 22, 2006, Green was dealt, along with $6.5 million in cash, by the Arizona Diamondbacks to the New York Mets for Triple-A 23-year-old left-handed pitcher, Evan MacLane.

=== New York Mets (2006–07) ===
==== 2006 ====
Green's second at-bat as a Met was an RBI single off Cardinals' pitcher Jason Marquis, another Jewish ball player.

Overall, in 2006 Green had his worst offensive year in a decade. He hit only 15 home runs, with 66 RBI, four stolen bases, a .432 slugging percentage, and a .277 batting average. Green's fifteen home runs matched his second-lowest total since becoming a full-time player. His 73 runs scored was also a significant drop-off from the 134 runs he scored in his outstanding 1999 season with Toronto. One bright point was that his .799 OPS against lefties was the tenth-best in the league for lefty batters. Curiously, while he had the ninth-highest ground ball/fly ball ratio in the league (2.17), he also tied with Barry Bonds for the longest average home run in the NL in 2006 (407 ft). His 470-foot (140 m) home run against the Mets on April 11 was the ninth-longest in the NL for the year, and only two longer home runs were hit in the AL. He also had another bright point—he struck out only 15.5% of the time, his best career year through 2006. He faded as the season progressed, dropping 65 points—and batting .240—after the All Star break.

After the season ended, Green was 18th of all active players in doubles (and younger than all those ahead of him), and in the top thirty of all active players in home runs, runs, total bases, and extra base hits. He was also in the top 100 of all players ever lifetime in home runs.

2006 marked only the second post-season appearance of Green's career. In the 2006 playoffs, Green tied for the team lead with three doubles, and hit .313, second best on the team (as the Mets hit only .250).

==== 2007 ====
On February 13, 2007, the Mets declined a $10 million mutual option on Green's contract, that would have kept him in New York through the 2008 season. He got a $2 million buyout instead. The report came amid retirement rumors. Green commented on them, saying: "There's been no decision on the future at all as far as I'm concerned. I'm planning on playing and seeing how things go...."

In the fifth inning of the May 25, 2007, game against the Florida Marlins, Green suffered a chip fracture of the first metatarsal bone in his right foot when he fouled a ball off of it. Green at the time of the injury was batting .314, tenth-best in the NL, and .341 against right-handers, with five home runs, 22 RBIs, twelve doubles, and four stolen bases. On May 29, Green was placed on the 15-day disabled list; his first time on the DL in his career. The bone was expected to fully heal in six weeks, but he was activated well before then; on June 11 he was back in the lineup, though the bone was not completely healed, and went 2–for–4 with a run batted in and a stolen base. On June 24, Green started at first base for the first time since 2006, when he was a member of the Diamondbacks.

=== Retirement ===
After the 2007 season, Green became a free agent. He chose to retire before the start of the 2008 season as he wanted to be with his family. Green confirmed his retirement on February 28, 2008.

Among all-time Jewish major league baseball players—through 2010—he was second in career home runs and RBIs (behind Hank Greenberg), and tenth in batting average (behind Morrie Arnovich).

=== Fielding ===
In 1998, Green had 14 assists and five double plays from the outfield. Most of Green's innings in the field were in right field, where he was awarded a Gold Glove Award in 1999. In 2005, he did not commit an error in the outfield. Green also played over 100 games at first base (mostly in 2004 and 2006), and over 50 games each in center field and left field.

=== Accomplishments ===
- Toronto Blue Jays Minor League Player of the Year (1994)
- Fifth in AL Rookie of the Year voting (1995)
- Topps All-Star Rookie Team (1995)
- Member of the 30–30 club (1998)
- All-Star (1999, 2002)
- AL Total Bases leader (1999)
- AL Doubles leader (1999)
- AL Gold Glove Award (1999)
- AL Silver Slugger Award (1999)
- Ninth in AL MVP voting (1999)
- Toronto Blue Jays Player of the Year (1999)
- Held Dodgers record for most home runs in a season for 23 years, with 49 (2001)
- Sixth in NL MVP voting (2001)
- LA Dodgers Player of the Year (2001)
- Four home runs in a game (May 23, 2002)
- Holds record for total bases in a game, with 19 (May 23, 2002)
- Fifth in NL MVP voting (2002)
- 20-Home Run Seasons: seven (1998–2002, 2004 & 2005)
- 30-Home Run Seasons: four (1998, 1999, 2001 & 2002)
- 40-Home Run Seasons: three (1999, 2001 & 2002)
- 100 RBI Seasons: four (1998, 1999, 2001 & 2002)
- 100 Runs Scored Seasons: four (1998, 1999, 2001 & 2002)
- Only Major League player to ever hit seven home runs in a three-game span (May 23 (4), 24 (1), 25 (2), 2002)
- Recorded his 2,000th Major League hit (September 25, 2007)

=== Hall of Fame candidacy ===
Green became eligible for the National Baseball Hall of Fame in 2013. 75% of the vote was necessary for induction, and 5% was necessary to stay on the ballot. Of the 37 total candidates, Green received two votes (0.4%) and was eliminated from future BBWAA voting.

== Team Israel ==
Green played and coached for the Israeli national baseball team in the 2013 World Baseball Classic qualifier in September 2012. He was eligible to play for Israel because he is Jewish. Under the Classic's rules, non-Israeli citizens of Jewish heritage can play for the country. Israel lost to Spain in extra innings in the Pool Finals, missing out on a spot in the tournament. During the first game of the tournament Green was the designated hitter and batted fifth, going 2-for-5 with a run scored and a strike out. Green did not play in the second game. During the third and final game, Green went 1-for-4 with a run batted in while leaving seven men on base.

== Non-baseball career ==
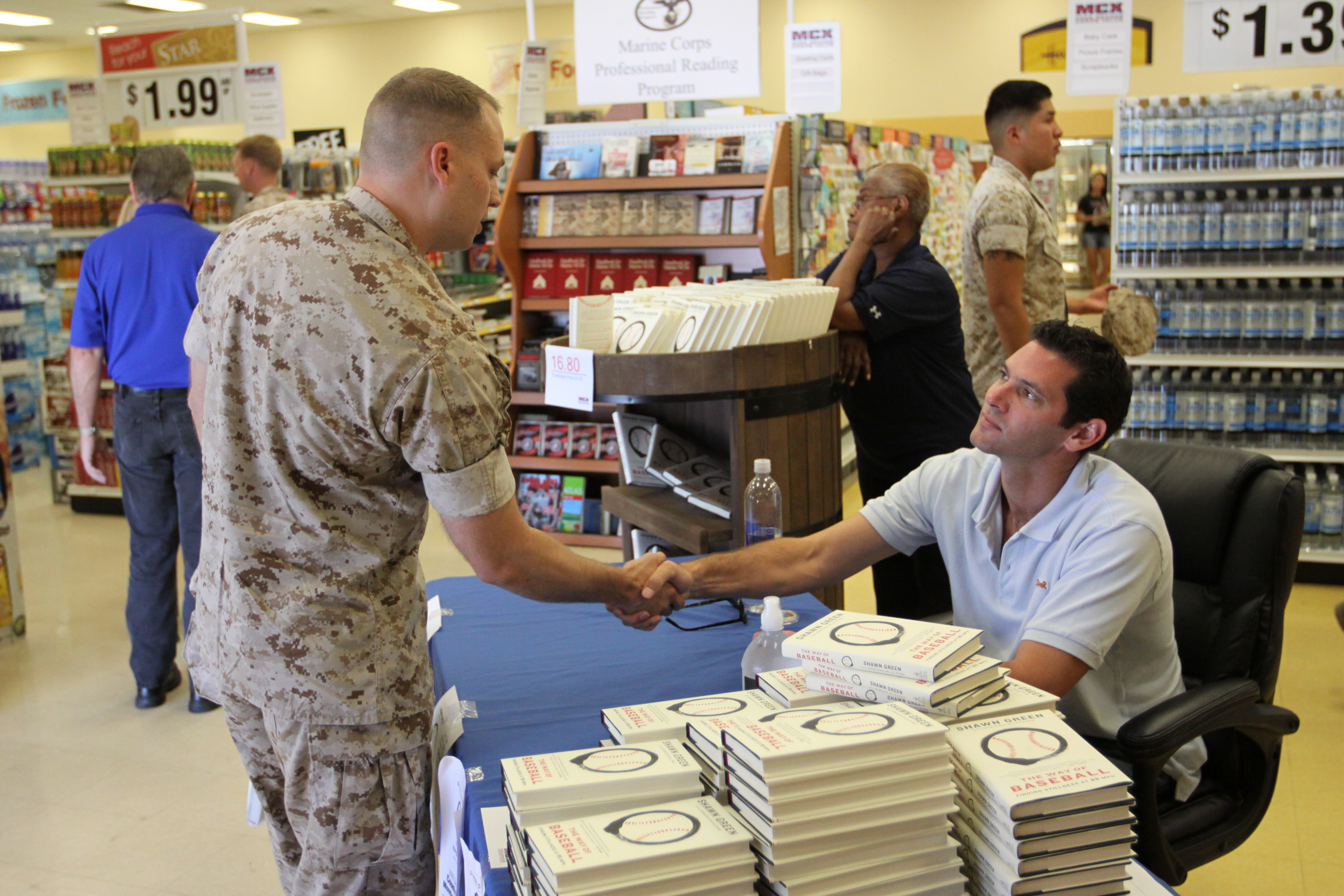
Green (right) at Camp Pendleton in 2011 to promote his book, The Way of Baseball

Green made a cameo appearance on the series premiere of the hit show Numb3rs (2005), while he was an active Los Angeles Dodgers player, in the film The Core (2003) and on The Nick Cannon Show (2002).

He founded Greenfly in 2014, a software company developing technology for sports and entertainment organizations and used by the Los Angeles Dodgers.

In 2011, Green, with co-author Gordon McAlpine, published The Way of Baseball, a memoir of his spiritual development through his baseball career.

== Charitable work ==
Green assists several charities, including the Juvenile Diabetes Research Foundation, Special Olympics, Parkinsons Foundation, and the United Jewish Federation. He donated $250,000 of his salary each year to the Dodgers' Dream Foundation ($1.5 million over siix years), supporting the development of 4 Dodger Dream Fields throughout LA and the purchase of books for local elementary schools and youth community programs. He also served as Spokesman for the Jewish Federation of Greater Los Angeles to promote literacy.

In 2007, Green pledged to donate $180—or 10 times chai—to the UJA-Federation of New York for every RBI. This was also matched by the New York Mets and Steiner Sports Collectibles. Chai, which means life in Hebrew, has a numerological value of 18 and the Jewish community often gives gifts in multiples of 18 as a result.

== Honors and awards ==
- Honored at the Baseball Assistance Team's annual Going to Bat for BAT fundraising dinner as the recipient of the Bart Giamatti Award for his off-the-field involvement in the community in 2000.
- Named Baseball Man of the Year at the Cedars-Sinai Sports Spectacular on June 29, 2003, an event that helped raise money for the hospital's genetic defects unit.
- Named a 2003 inductee into the Arizona Fall League Hall of Fame.
- Presented the Hank Greenberg Sportsmanship Award by the American Jewish Historical Society in 2004.
- Inducted into the Orange County Jewish Sports Hall of Fame at the Merage Jewish Community Center in Irvine, California.
- Inducted into the Jewish Sports Hall of Fame Northern California.
- Inducted into the Southern California Jewish Sports Hall of Fame (2001).
- Inducted into the National Jewish Sports Hall of Fame (2005).
- Inducted into the International Jewish Sports Hall of Fame (2014).

== Miscellaneous ==
- Green's walkup songs were "Be Yourself" by Audioslave and "Song 2" by Blur.
- Threw his batting gloves to children each time he hit a home run in his home ballpark.
- Has two bats in the National Baseball Hall of Fame—1: the bat he used on May 23, 2002, to hit four homers against the Milwaukee Brewers, and 2: the bat he used to hit a grand slam on May 21, 2000, one of a record six grand slams hit on that day.
- Shawn Green was also a playable character in Backyard Baseball 2001, Backyard Baseball 2003, and Backyard Baseball 2005, representing the Dodgers.

== See also ==
- List of Major League Baseball career hits leaders
- List of Major League Baseball career home run leaders
- List of Major League Baseball home run records
- List of Major League Baseball career doubles leaders
- List of Major League Baseball career runs scored leaders
- List of Major League Baseball career runs batted in leaders
- List of Major League Baseball annual doubles leaders
- List of Major League Baseball career stolen bases leaders
- List of Major League Baseball single-game home run leaders
- List of Major League Baseball single-game hits leaders
- List of Jewish Major League Baseball players

Awards and achievements
Preceded by Ryan Klesko, Raúl Mondesí, Manny Ramírez	Topps Rookie All-Star Outfielder; 1995	Succeeded by Jermaine Dye, Todd Hollandsworth, F.P. Santangelo
Preceded by Mike Cameron	Batters with 4 home runs in one game May 23, 2002	Succeeded by Carlos Delgado
