= Carlos Delgado =

Puerto Rican baseball player (born 1972)

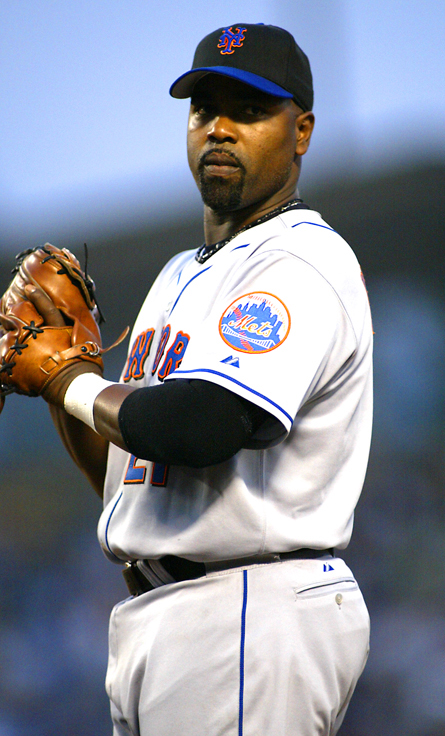
- Delgado with the New York Mets in 2008
- First baseman
- Born: June 25, 1972 (age 54); Aguadilla, Puerto Rico
- Batted: Left Threw: Right

MLB debut
- October 1, 1993, for the Toronto Blue Jays

Last MLB appearance
- May 10, 2009, for the New York Mets

MLB statistics
- Batting average: .280
- Hits: 2,038
- Home runs: 473
- Runs batted in: 1,512
- Stats at Baseball Reference

Teams
- Toronto Blue Jays (1993–2004); Florida Marlins (2005); New York Mets (2006–2009)

Career highlights and awards
- 2× All-Star (2000, 2003); 3× Silver Slugger Award (1999, 2000, 2003); AL Hank Aaron Award (2000); Roberto Clemente Award (2006); AL RBI leader (2003); Hit four home runs in one game on September 25, 2003; Toronto Blue Jays Hall of Excellence

Member of the Canadian

Baseball Hall of Fame
- Induction: 2015
Medals
Men's baseball
Representing Puerto Rico
World Baseball Classic
Silver medal – second place	2013 San Francisco	Team
Silver medal – second place	2017 Los Angeles	Team

Carlos Juan Delgado Hernández (born June 25, 1972) is a Puerto Rican former professional baseball player and coach. He played in Major League Baseball primarily as a first baseman, from 1993 to 2009, most prominently as a member of the Toronto Blue Jays, where he was a member of the 1993 World Series-winning team, won the 2000 American League (AL) Hank Aaron Award, and was the 2003 AL RBI leader. He was also a two-time AL All-Star player and a three-time Silver Slugger Award winner during his tenure with the Blue Jays.

Delgado holds the Major League Baseball record for career home runs by a Puerto Rican player with 473. He is one of only six players in Major League history to hit 30 home runs in ten consecutive seasons, becoming the fourth player to do so. During his 12 years with the Toronto Blue Jays, Delgado set many team records, including home runs (336), RBI (1,058), walks (827), slugging percentage (.556), on-base plus slugging (.949), runs (889), total bases (2,786), doubles (343), runs created (1,077), extra base hits (690), times on base (2,362), hit by pitch (122), intentional walks (128) and at bats per home run (14.9).

Delgado also played for the Florida Marlins and New York Mets. In 2006, he was named the recipient of the prestigious Roberto Clemente Award. On February 4, 2015, Delgado was elected to the Canadian Baseball Hall of Fame.

== Early life ==
Delgado was born in Aguadilla, Puerto Rico to Carlos "Cao" Delgado and Carmen Digna Hérnandez. He grew up in the El Prado section of Aguadilla. There, he attended elementary school alongside his three siblings. Both his father, "Don Cao", and his grandfather, Asdrúbal "Pingolo" Delgado, were well-known figures in the town. Delgado has said that this made him feel "protected," but that it also demanded that he had to behave properly.

Delgado attended Agustín Stahl Middle School and José de Diego High School, from which he graduated in 1989. Delgado has expressed his strong feelings of pride in being an Aguadillano, noting everything he holds dear is found in the municipality, and his off-season house is located there. He is friends with many people who live there, many of whom he played Little League baseball with.

== Professional career ==
=== Toronto Blue Jays ===
At the age of 16, several major league organizations including the Cincinnati Reds, Montreal Expos, New York Mets, Texas Rangers, and Toronto Blue Jays saw his potential and attempted to sign him. He signed with the Blue Jays in 1988, after being discovered by team scout Epy Guerrero. In 1992, Delgado played for the Dunedin Blue Jays of the Florida State League and produced 30 home runs and 100 RBI, leading the league in both categories, along with a .324 batting average. That season, he was named USA Today's Minor League Player of the Year. Before the 1993 season, he was named the number 4 prospect in the minor leagues by Baseball America and was promoted to the Double-A Knoxville Smokies. That year, he hit .303 with 25 home runs, 102 RBI, and 102 walks, winning the Southern League MVP Award.

Carlos Delgado is a member of the Toronto Blue Jays' Level of Excellence.

As a September call-up, he made his major league debut on October 1, 1993, drawing a walk in his first career plate appearance. Though he didn't play in the 1993 postseason, in which the Blue Jays won the World Series, he was awarded a World Series ring. Originally a catcher, Delgado played in left field for the Blue Jays in 1994 and 1995, before switching to first base, where he became one of the most productive sluggers in the major leagues. Starting in 1997, he hit at least 30 home runs in ten consecutive seasons. A two-time All-Star, in 2000 and 2003, Delgado holds several Blue Jays single-season and career records. He won the Hank Aaron and The Sporting News Player of the Year Awards in 2000, and the Silver Slugger Award in 1999, 2000, and 2003.

In 1999, Delgado hit a career-high 44 home runs, along with 134 RBI, and a .272 batting average. The next year, he batted a career-high .344, along with 41 home runs, 57 doubles, and 137 RBI. He finished fourth in the 2000 American League MVP voting.

In 2002, Delgado set an MLB record by reaching base safely in his first 10 plate appearances of the season. The record was tied in 2026 by Joey Wiemer of the Washington Nationals.

On September 25, 2003, in a game against the Tampa Bay Devil Rays, Delgado became the 15th major league player to hit four home runs in one game. He hit a three-run home run in the first inning off Jorge Sosa, then again off Sosa while leading off the fourth, then off Joe Kennedy while leading off in the sixth and then off Lance Carter leading off the eighth inning. Delgado is the only player to hit four home runs with only 4 at-bats in a game. In the 2003 season, Delgado hit 42 home runs and led the Majors with 145 RBI, while batting .302; he finished second to Alex Rodriguez for the AL MVP Award. He was named AL Player of the Week on September 30, 2003, and again on September 7, 2004.

Following the 2004 season, Delgado became a free agent, and was pursued by the Baltimore Orioles, Florida Marlins, New York Mets, Seattle Mariners and Texas Rangers. The Blue Jays were not interested in re-signing him, due to payroll constraints.

=== Florida Marlins ===
On January 25, 2005, Delgado chose to sign with the Florida Marlins, signing a four-year, $52 million contract. He made a successful transition to the National League, with a .301 batting average, .399 on-base percentage, 33 home runs, and 115 RBI in 2005. At the same time, he shared the major league lead in errors for a first baseman, with 14.

Following the 2005 season, the Marlins performed one of their periodic salary-cutting maneuvers, unloading some of their higher-paid players. On November 23, 2005, the Marlins sent Delgado and $7 million to the New York Mets for Mike Jacobs, Yusmeiro Petit, and Grant Psomas.

=== New York Mets ===
==== 2006 season ====
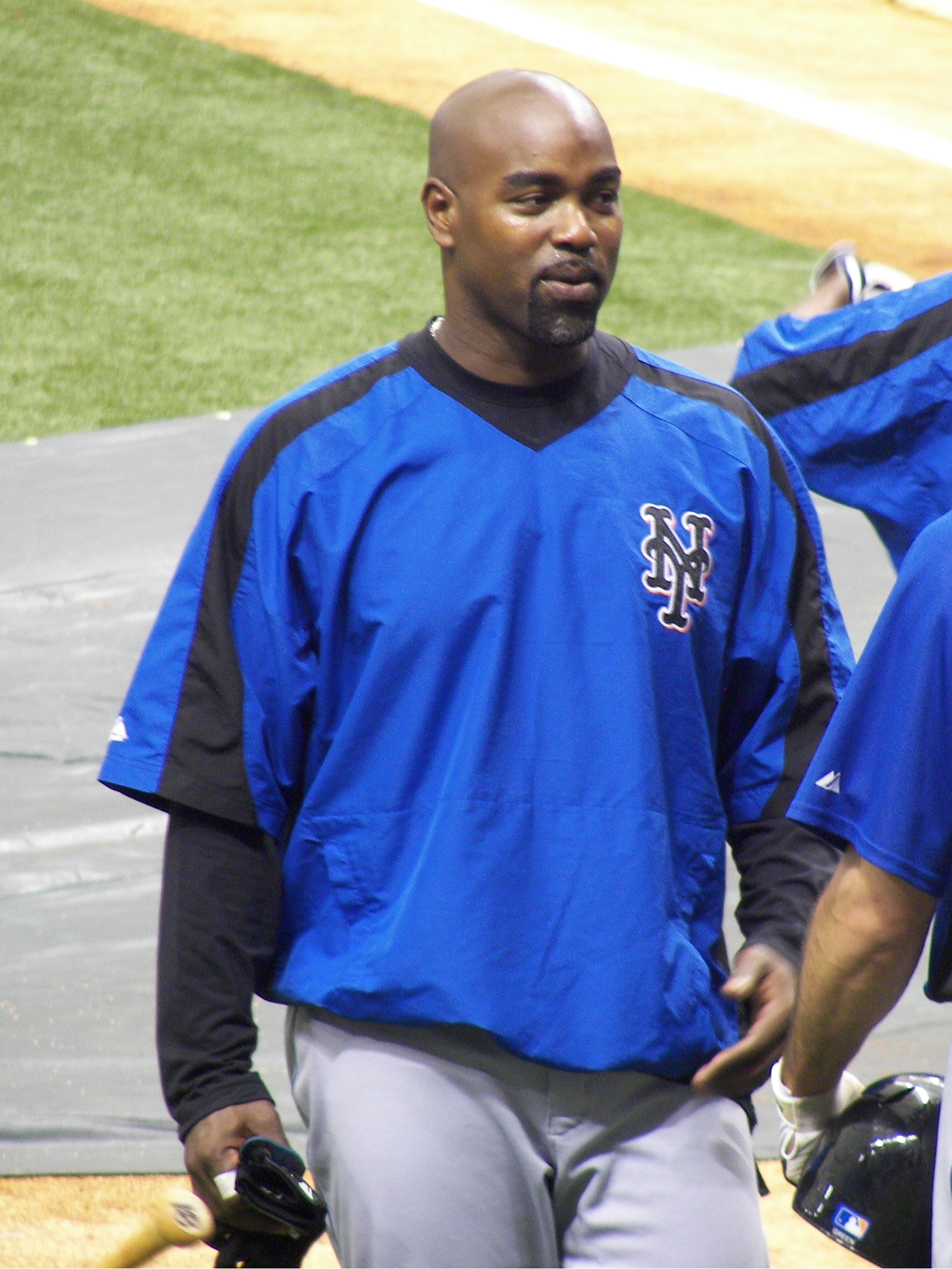
Carlos Delgado at 2007 spring training

Delgado responded well as the Mets' cleanup hitter, hitting 38 home runs and driving in 114 runs in 2006. With Delgado hitting between fellow Puerto Rican Carlos Beltrán and third baseman David Wright, the Mets had the best record in the National League in 2006 but lost to the St. Louis Cardinals in the National League Championship Series in seven games. At season's end, Delgado was tied with Duke Snider with 407 career home runs, 41st most in MLB history at the time. Through 2006, Delgado was the all-time leader for interleague play RBIs with 131, and second all-time in home runs with 43.

==== 2007 season ====
Carlos Delgado had early struggles in the 2007 season, with his batting average at .196 on May 3, but his numbers improved as the season progressed. On May 9, 2007, he hit a home run into McCovey Cove during a game against the San Francisco Giants, becoming the first visiting player to have hit three splash home runs at AT&T Park. Delgado ended the season tied with Cal Ripken Jr. for 37th place on the all-time career home run list with 431.

==== 2008 season ====
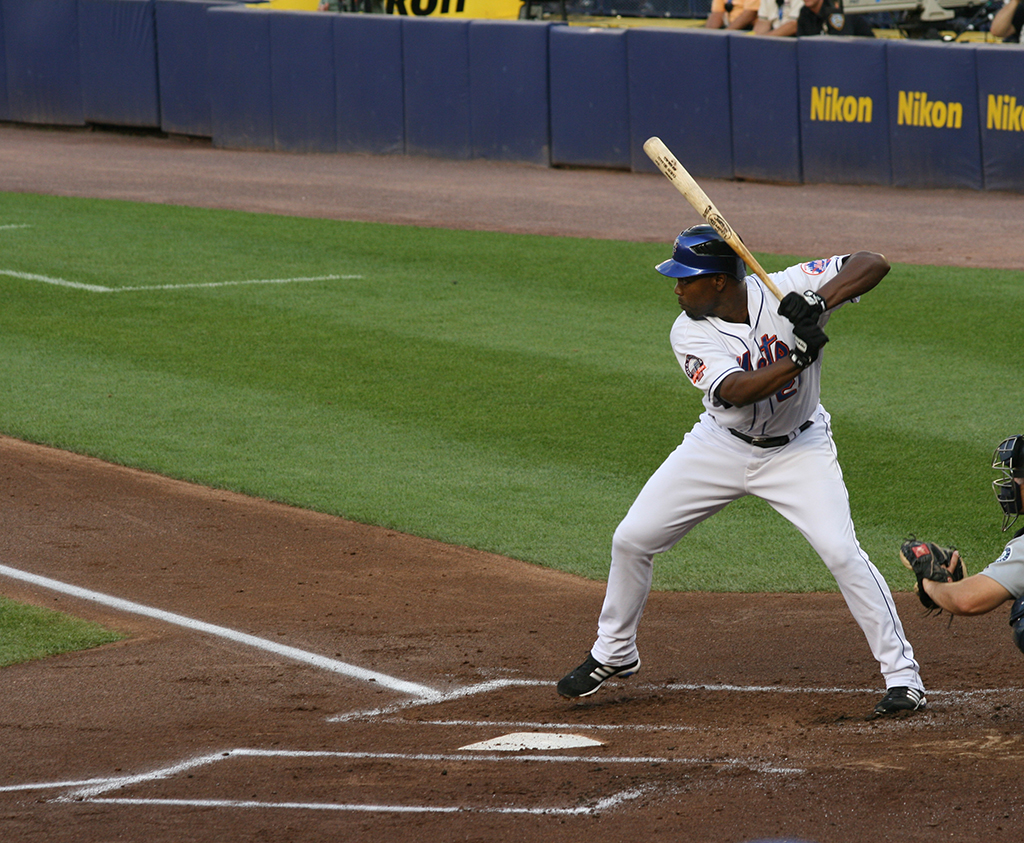
Delgado at bat for New York in 2008

During spring training 2008, Delgado was diagnosed with a hip impingement, but the Mets decided to keep him on the active roster. As in the previous year, Delgado began the season in an offensive slump with a .204 batting average in April, and hitting just three home runs, but once again his stats improved as the season continued. In May, his batting average increased to .235 with five home runs. On June 15, 2008, Delgado broke Juan González's record for most runs batted in by a Puerto Rican player. On June 27, Delgado set a new Mets record with 9 RBIs (hitting a two-run double, grand slam, and three-run home run) in an interleague game versus the New York Yankees, breaking Dave Kingman's club record of 8. In the final game before the All-Star break, Delgado hit his 17th home run of the season. Between June and July his batting average improved, rising to .260 with 19 home runs. Between July 23–31, Delgado hit four home runs.

On August 21, 2008, against the Atlanta Braves, Delgado went 5 for 5 with 3 singles, 3 RBIs, a double, and a walk-off single scoring David Wright in the ninth off the glove of left fielder Omar Infante. It was the first time he had gone 5 for 5 in 10 years. The Mets swept the three-game set. On August 25, 2008, against the Houston Astros, Delgado hit two 3-run homers to lead the Mets to a 9–1 victory in the finale of the series. On September 7 he became the third Mets player in history to have at least 65 RBIs in a 65-game stretch in a season. On September 9, he tied Dave Kingman's record of most multi-home run games during a season as a Met with 7. Delgado notched his 2,000th career hit on September 21, 2008, against the Atlanta Braves. On October 31 the Mets exercised Delgado's $12 million option. Delgado was ninth in the voting for the 2008 National League MVP Award, behind Albert Pujols, Ryan Howard, Ryan Braun, Manny Ramirez, Lance Berkman, CC Sabathia, David Wright and Brad Lidge.

==== 2009 season ====
Delgado was the first Major League player to hit a home run into the Pepsi Porch at Citi Field on April 8, 2009. He played his last major league game against the Pittsburgh Pirates on May 10, 2009. Eight days later on May 18, the Mets announced that Delgado had a bone spur and a torn labrum in his hip, and he would have to undergo surgery. The Mets reported the next day that the surgery was successful and Delgado would be out for approximately ten weeks, which would delay his quest for 500 home runs. However, he did not play again in 2009.

Delgado filed for free agency on November 5. Delgado made his return to the Puerto Rico Baseball League (PRBL) winter league, registering a batting average of .364 and one home run in his first three games. He had seven hits in eight games in the winter league season.

=== 2010 free agency ===
In February 2010, Delgado underwent another hip operation, this time to reconstruct the labrum on his right hip. He also underwent a micro-fracture procedure on his hip socket. Although Delgado had reportedly received interest from MLB clubs, including the Mets and Marlins, he felt pain in his hip and decided to undergo the second surgery to be better prepared for the coming season. According to his agent, David Sloane, Delgado "felt, despite the time it would take, it was a better option for him to be the Carlos Delgado of old instead of an old Carlos Delgado."

=== Pawtucket Red Sox ===
On August 7, 2010, the Boston Red Sox signed Delgado to a minor league contract. He played 5 games with the Triple-A Pawtucket Red Sox between August 9 and 15, collecting 3 singles in 13 at-bats with 2 RBI. This was the entire extent of Delgado's 2010 season after Delgado suffered a setback with his surgically repaired hip.

=== Retirement ===
On April 13, 2011, Delgado officially announced, while in San Juan, Puerto Rico, his retirement from professional baseball after 17 MLB seasons.

On December 7, 2012, the Blue Jays announced that Delgado would be the 10th person inducted to the club's Level of Excellence. The induction occurred on July 21, 2013, at Rogers Centre in Toronto. Delgado threw the ceremonial first pitch for that day's Blue Jays game.

=== Career statistics ===
In 2,035 games over 17 seasons, Delgado posted a .280 batting average with 1241 runs, 483 doubles, 18 triples, 473 home runs, 1,512 RBI, 1,109 walks, .383 on-base percentage and .546 slugging percentage. He finished his career with a .992 fielding percentage primarily as a first baseman. In ten postseason games, he hit .351 (13-for-37) with eight runs, three doubles, four home runs, 11 RBIs and six walks.

== International career ==
Delgado represented the Puerto Rico national team in international competition. In the 2006 World Baseball Classic, he singled in his only at-bat of the tournament. His role on the Puerto Rican squad was much more prominent at the 2009 World Baseball Classic, where he slashed .438/.625/.938 in 16 plate appearances. Delgado led the team with 7 walks and tied with Iván Rodríguez for the most home runs on the team with 2 apiece.

After his retirement, he was hitting coach for Puerto Rico in the 2013 World Baseball Classic. He reprised his role in the 2017 World Baseball Classic.

== Post-retirement career ==
After retiring, Delgado has continued to work in matters closely related to baseball. In February 2013, he was announced as the new member of the Board for the Development of the Puerto Rican Full-Time Athlete. This agency is directed by the Department of Sports and Recreation of Puerto Rico.

Also, in March 2013, he served as hitting coach for the Puerto Rico national baseball team that represented the island at the 2013 World Baseball Classic. The team finished second in the rankings. He reprised his role as hitting coach for Team Puerto Rico in the 2017 World Baseball Classic.

In his only appearance on the Baseball Hall of Fame BBWAA ballot in 2015, Delgado received just 3.8% of the vote, below the 5% minimum required to remain on future ballots. That same year, he was elected to the Canadian Baseball Hall of Fame. In 2025, it was announced that Delgado would appear on the Contemporary Baseball Era Committee ballot for the Baseball Hall of Fame. He received 9 out of 16 votes (56.25%), three votes below the threshold for induction.

== Personal life ==
Delgado lives in his hometown of Aguadilla, Puerto Rico. He is married to Betzaida García, who is also from Aguadilla. They have a son, Carlos Antonio, and in 2010 adopted a baby daughter, Mariana Isabel.

=== Social activism ===
Like his hero, Roberto Clemente, Delgado is a well-known peace activist, and has been open about his political beliefs. As part of the Navy-Vieques protests, Delgado was actively opposed to the use of the island of Vieques, Puerto Rico as a bombing target practice facility by the United States Department of Defense, until bombing was halted in 2003. He was also against the occupation of Iraq. In the 2004 season, Delgado protested the war by silently staying in the dugout during the playing of "God Bless America" during the seventh inning stretch. Delgado does not make a public show of his beliefs, and even his teammates were not aware of his views until a story was published in July 2004 in the Toronto Star. Delgado was quoted as saying "It's a very terrible thing that happened on September 11. It's (also) a terrible thing that happened in Afghanistan and Iraq, ... I just feel so sad for the families that lost relatives and loved ones in the war. But I think it's the stupidest war ever." The story was the subject of a media frenzy, mostly in New York, where on July 21, 2004, as was anticipated, Delgado was booed by Yankee fans for his passive protest during a game at Yankee Stadium. Delgado had explained that the playing of "God Bless America" had come to be equated with a war in which he didn't believe. In a New York Times interview, Delgado said this is what he believed in, and "It takes a man to stand up for what he believes." After being traded to the Mets, in a conciliatory measure, Delgado opted to stand during the singing of "God Bless America".

Among other charity work, Delgado is well known for his generous visits to hospitals in his hometown where, on Three Kings Day, he brings toys to hospitalized children. In 2006, he joined Puerto Rico's Senate President in co-sponsoring a Three Kings gift-giving effort in the town of Loíza. Delgado started his own non-profit organization, "Extra Bases", to assist island youth. In 2007, Delgado donated video conference equipment to allow his hometown's Buen Samaritano Hospital to establish a regular link with a hospital in Boston in order to allow for remote diagnoses through telemedicine.

Delgado has also contributed to improving Puerto Rico's public education system. In 2007, he participated in "Sapientis Week", an initiative sponsored by the non-profit Sapientis which brings distinguished public figures into classrooms in order to raise the public's awareness of the education crisis in Puerto Rico. Delgado taught a class on Athletic Mental Training and Health at the Ramon Power y Giralt School in the Luis Llorens Torres public housing complex.

For his efforts, Delgado was awarded the Roberto Clemente Award in 2006. The award goes to the player in baseball who best exemplifies humanitarianism and sportsmanship, and was named after Hall of Famer Roberto Clemente in 1973. Prior to the 2008 season of the Puerto Rico Baseball League, Delgado was involved in an initiative to provide economic help to the Indios de Mayagüez team.

== Awards and honors ==
- World Series champion (1993)
- 2-time All-Star (2000, 2003)
- 3-time AL Silver Slugger Award (1999, 2000, 2003)
- AL RBI leader (2003)
- 2000 AL Hank Aaron Award
- 2000 Sporting News Player of the Year Award
- 2006 Roberto Clemente Award
- Toronto Blue Jays Level of Excellence
- Member of the Canadian Baseball Hall of Fame

== See also ==
- List of Afro-Latinos
- List of Major League Baseball players from Puerto Rico
- List of Major League Baseball home run records
- List of Major League Baseball doubles records
- List of Major League Baseball career home run leaders
- List of Major League Baseball career doubles leaders
- List of Major League Baseball career runs scored leaders
- List of Major League Baseball career runs batted in leaders
- List of Major League Baseball career hits leaders
- List of Major League Baseball career total bases leaders
- List of Major League Baseball annual runs batted in leaders
- List of Major League Baseball annual doubles leaders
- MLB hitters with four home runs in one game

Achievements
Preceded by Shawn Green	Batters with 4 home runs in one game September 25, 2003	Succeeded by Josh Hamilton
