= Justin Wrobleski =

American baseball player (born 2000)

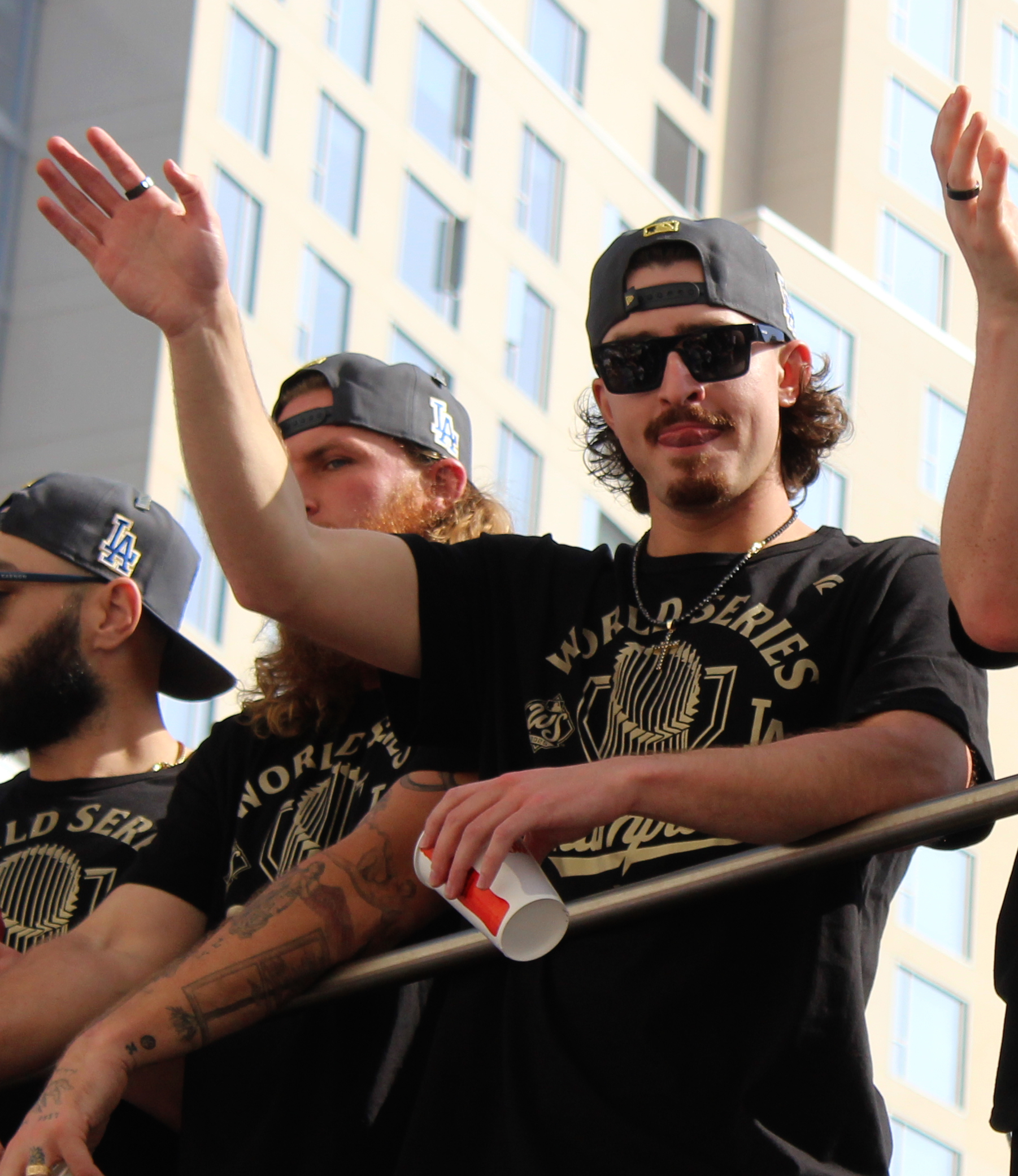
- Wrobleski at the 2025 Dodgers parade

Los Angeles Dodgers – No. 70
- Pitcher
- Born: July 14, 2000 (age 26); Hoffman Estates, Illinois, U.S.
- Bats: Left Throws: Left

MLB debut
- July 7, 2024, for the Los Angeles Dodgers

MLB statistics (through 2026 season)
- Win–loss record: 18–12
- Earned run average: 4.15
- Strikeouts: 220
- Stats at Baseball Reference

Teams
- Los Angeles Dodgers (2024–present)

Career highlights and awards
- All-Star (2026); World Series champion (2025)

Justin Michael Wrobleski (born July 14, 2000), nicknamed "the Shark", is an American professional baseball pitcher for the Los Angeles Dodgers of Major League Baseball (MLB). He made his MLB debut in 2024. Wrobleski was named to his first All-Star game in 2026.

== Career ==
=== Amateur career ===
Wrobleski attended Sequoyah High School in Canton, Georgia. He was selected by the Seattle Mariners in the 36th round of the 2018 Major League Baseball draft, but did not sign. He started his college baseball career at Clemson University before transferring to State College of Florida, Manatee–Sarasota and then Oklahoma State University. In 2019, he played collegiate summer baseball with the Falmouth Commodores of the Cape Cod Baseball League.

=== Los Angeles Dodgers ===
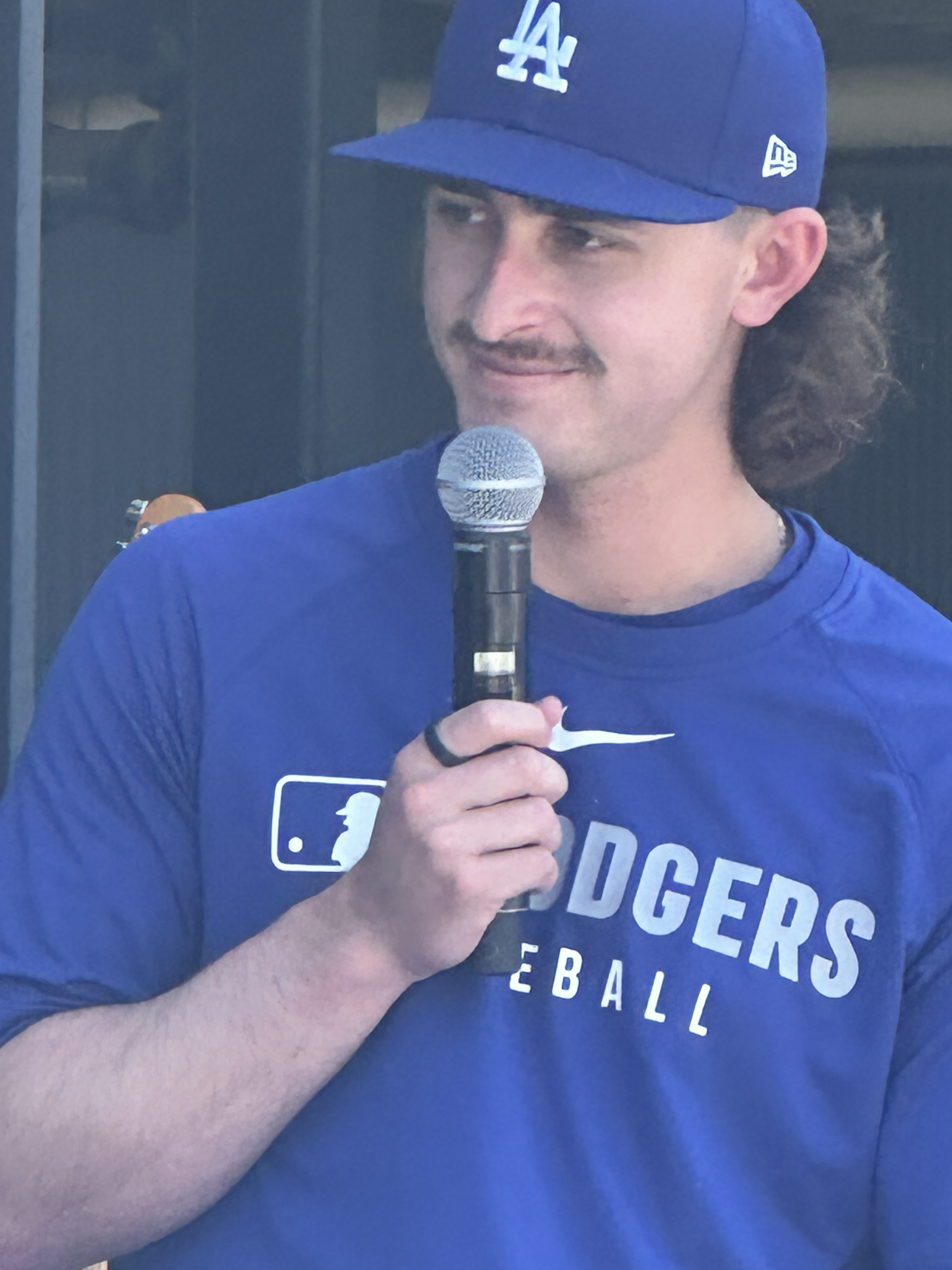
Wrobleski being interviewed during a game in 2024

Two months prior to the 2021 MLB draft, Wrobleski underwent Tommy John surgery to repair a tear in his UCL. Despite this, the Los Angeles Dodgers selected him in the 11th round of the draft, to which he signed with a $197,500 signing bonus. He made his professional debut in 2022 with the Arizona Complex League Dodgers and was later promoted to the Rancho Cucamonga Quakes, pitching a combined 21 2/3 innings over 13 games with a 2.91 ERA. He then made 23 starts for the 2023 Great Lakes Loons, with a 4–4 record and 2.90 ERA with 109 strikeouts.

Wrobleski started 2024 with the Tulsa Drillers of the Double-A Texas League and was promoted to the Triple-A Oklahoma City Baseball Club on June 22. On July 7, the Dodgers purchased his contract and called him up to the majors to make his MLB debut with a spot start against the Milwaukee Brewers. He allowed four runs in five innings in a loss, with four strikeouts, the first of which was of Willy Adames. On August 16, Wrobleski picked up his first major league win against the St. Louis Cardinals. On September 1, he allowed 10 runs in a game against the Arizona Diamondbacks, which tied a Los Angeles Dodgers team record for most earned runs allowed in a single game. On September 28, Wrobleski picked up his first career save against the Colorado Rockies after pitching four innings of relief. On the season, he made six starts and two relief appearances in the majors with a 5.70 ERA. Between Tulsa and Oklahoma City, he made 20 appearances (18 starts) for a 6–4 record and 3.76 ERA.

In 2025, he was on the Dodgers active roster for Opening Day, but was optioned to Oklahoma City the following day, without appearing in a game. He was called back up to make a spot start for the Dodgers on April 8 against the Washington Nationals. He made one more start on June 6 and then transitioned into a relief role for the rest of the season. He finished 5–5 with a 4.32 ERA in 24 games with 76 strikeouts. Wrobleski made the NL Wild Card roster against the Cincinnati Reds, but did not pitch. He was then left off of the NLDS roster (along with pitcher Edgardo Henriquez) in favor of pitchers Clayton Kershaw and Anthony Banda, but then was re-added to the roster after an injury to pitcher Tanner Scott. He pitched five scoreless innings across four games in the 2025 World Series, allowing four hits while striking out six. During Game 7 of the series, Wrobleski hit Andrés Giménez with a pitch, causing the benches to empty when Giménez took offense. Warnings were to be issued to both sides, but it ultimately did not factor into the rest of the game, as the Dodgers won 5–4 in extra innings, making Wrobleski a world champion.

In 2026, Wrobleski started the season as a reliever but transitioned to the starting rotation after an injury to left hander Blake Snell. By the All-Star break, he had accumulated a 10–2 record in 100 1/3 innings with a 2.69 ERA and 73 strikeouts. He was named to the 2026 All-Star roster on July 11 as a replacement for Cincinnati Reds pitcher Chase Burns. Wrobleski wound up on the injured list on August 16 due to left forearm inflammation and when he returned he was back in the bullpen. For the season, he appeared in 28 games (22 as a starter) with a 12–5 record, 3.66 ERA and 118 strikeouts.
