= Nick Kurtz =

American baseball player (born 2003)

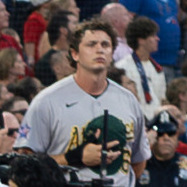
- Kurtz at the 2026 MLB All-Star Game

Athletics – No. 16
- First baseman
- Born: March 12, 2003 (age 23); Lancaster, Pennsylvania, U.S.
- Bats: Left Throws: Left

MLB debut
- April 23, 2025, for the Athletics

MLB statistics (through 2026 season)
- Batting average: .275
- Home runs: 57
- Runs batted in: 155
- Stats at Baseball Reference

Teams
- Athletics (2025–present)

Career highlights and awards
- All-Star (2026); AL Rookie of the Year (2025); Silver Slugger Award (2025); Hit four home runs in one game on July 25, 2025
Medals
Men's baseball
Representing United States
U-12 Baseball World Cup
Gold medal – first place	2015 Tainan	Team

Nicholas Jeffrey Kurtz (born March 12, 2003), nicknamed "Big Amish", is an American professional baseball first baseman for the Athletics of Major League Baseball (MLB). He played college baseball for the Wake Forest Demon Deacons and was selected by the Athletics in the first round of the 2024 MLB draft. He made his MLB debut in 2025. Kurtz was named to his first All-Star game in 2026.

== Amateur career ==
Kurtz played for the USA 12U National Team and won a gold medal at the 2015 World Cup. He spent his freshman year at Manheim Township High School, before transferring to the Baylor School in Chattanooga, Tennessee. Alongside baseball, he competed in basketball. He lettered all four years in baseball and three years in basketball. He committed to Wake Forest University to play college baseball during his sophomore year at Baylor.

As a freshman at Wake Forest in 2022, Kurtz was named a freshman All-American after hitting .338/.471/.637 with 15 home runs and 56 runs batted in (RBI) over 204 at-bats in 54 games. As a sophomore in 2023, he hit .353/.527/.784 with 24 home runs and 69 RBI over 190 at-bats in 56 games and was named a first team All-American by the American Baseball Coaches Association. As a junior in 2024, Kurtz was named team captain and slashed .306/.531/.763 with 22 home runs and 57 RBI. Kurtz left Wake Forest as the program's all-time leader in walks (189).

== Professional career ==
=== Athletics ===
==== 2024: Draft and minor leagues ====
Kurtz was a top prospect entering the 2024 Major League Baseball draft; the Oakland Athletics selected him in the first round, with the fourth overall selection. On July 22, 2024, Kurtz signed with Oakland, receiving a $7 million signing bonus. He split his first professional season between the Single-A Stockton Ports and Double-A Midland RockHounds. Kurtz was assigned to the Triple-A Las Vegas Aviators to begin the 2025 season.

==== 2025: Rookie of the year ====
On April 21, 2025, Kurtz was promoted to the major leagues for the first time, after just 32 total games in the minor leagues. He made his MLB debut two days later against the Texas Rangers, where he went 1-for-4 with an RBI single. On May 13, Kurtz hit his first career home run off of J. P. Feyereisen of the Los Angeles Dodgers. On June 16, Kurtz hit a two-run walk-off home run off Bryan Abreu of the Houston Astros to give the A's a 3–1 victory. It was the first walk-off home run of Kurtz’s Major League career, at a Statcast-projected 447-foot, making it the longest walk-off homer by an A’s player since Statcast began tracking in 2015.

On July 25, 2025, Kurtz became the first rookie in MLB history and the first Athletics player to hit four home runs in a game, overall getting six hits in six ABs for the game. The other two hits were a double and a single, thus tying Shawn Green's 23-year-old MLB record for total bases in a game with 19. The home runs came off of four different Houston Astros pitchers, including position player Cooper Hummel, in a 15–3 Athletics victory. Kurtz was named the American League Player of the Month for July after hitting .395/.480/.953 for the month, with 24 runs, 11 home runs, and 27 RBI. He was the first Athletic to win Player of the Month since Josh Donaldson in September 2013. On September 13, Kurtz hit a 493 foot grand slam off of Scott Barlow of the Cincinnati Reds which was both the longest homer ever by an Athletics hitter since Statcast was introduced in 2015 and tied with the longest homer in two years with Shohei Ohtani. Kurtz was named AL Rookie of the Year in 2025.

==== 2026: First All-Star appearance ====
In 2026, Kurtz started the season as the Opening Day first baseman for the Athletics. On May 25, Kurtz reached base for the 48th straight game which tied Mark McGwire in 1996 for the longest on-base streak in Athletics history. The streak began on April 3, with a walk against Cristian Javier, and ended on May 26 with Kurtz going 0-4 with three strikeouts in a 4-1 loss to the Seattle Mariners. Kurtz was subsequently named American League Player of the Month for the second time of his career, finishing the month of May with a .333 batting average, a 1.025 OPS, and five home runs to go along with his on-base streak.

On July 4, Kurtz was elected to his first All-Star game as an American League reserve. At the All-Star break, Kurtz had a slash line of .266/.405/.497 to go along with 20 home runs, 66 RBIs, and a league leading 76 base on balls. After Toronto Blue Jays first baseman, Vladimir Guerrero Jr., elected not to play in the game, Kurtz was named as his replacement to start at first base. However, on July 11, Kurtz announced that he would not be able to participate in the All-Star Game after the Athletics placed him on the 10-day IL with a right thumb strain. New York Yankees first-baseman, Ben Rice, was chosen to replace him in the starting lineup, with Chicago White Sox outfielder, Tristan Peters, taking his roster spot. On August 11, manager Mark Kotsay announced that Kurtz had received a platelet-rich plasma injection for the injury. He was transferred to the 60–day injured list on August 21.

== Personal life ==
Kurtz was born on March 12, 2003, to Marie and Jeff Kurtz. He has two brothers and one sister; his older brother Logan played collegiate baseball at Penn State Berks from 2012 to 2013. His father works in real estate. Kurtz's parents enrolled him in tee-ball when he was four years old.

While on the Athletics, his teammates gave Kurtz the nickname "Big Amish", a jocular reference to his stature at 6 ft 5 in (1.96 m), 240 lb (110 kg) and his hometown of Lancaster, Pennsylvania, which has a large Amish community. After a home run, Kurtz began celebrating by twirling his hands in a circular motion, in homage to the Amish tradition of churning butter. Kurtz himself is not Amish.

Kurtz grew up a fan of the Philadelphia Phillies.

== See also ==
- Athletics award winners and league leaders
- List of Major League Baseball home run records
- List of Major League Baseball single-game hits leaders
- List of Major League Baseball single-game home run leaders
- List of Major League Baseball single-game runs scored leaders

Awards
Preceded by Jacob Wilson; Himself	American League Rookie of the Month; June 2025; July 2025	Succeeded by Himself; Roman Anthony
Preceded by Eugenio Suárez	Batters with four home runs in one game July 25, 2025	Succeeded by Kyle Schwarber
Preceded by Cal Raleigh; Yordan Alvarez	American League Player of the Month; July 2025; May 2026	Succeeded by Shea Langeliers; Junior Caminero
