= Total bases =

Number of bases a baseball player has gained with hits

In baseball statistics, total bases is the number of bases a player gains with hits. It is a weighted sum with values of 1 for a single, 2 for a double, 3 for a triple and 4 for a home run. For example, three singles is three total bases, while a double and a home run is six total bases.

Only bases attained from hits count toward this total. Reaching base by other means (such as a base on balls) or advancing further after the hit (such as a stolen base) does not increase the player's total bases. In box scores and other statistical summaries, total bases is often denoted by the abbreviation TB.

The total bases divided by the number of at bats is the player's slugging percentage.

Reaching 400 total bases in a season puts one into one of baseball's most exclusive clubs, one with only nineteen members. The most recent player to achieve this mark was Shohei Ohtani, with 411 in 2024.

== Records ==
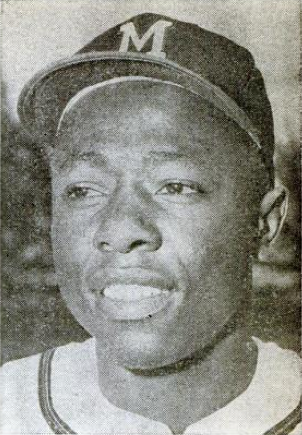
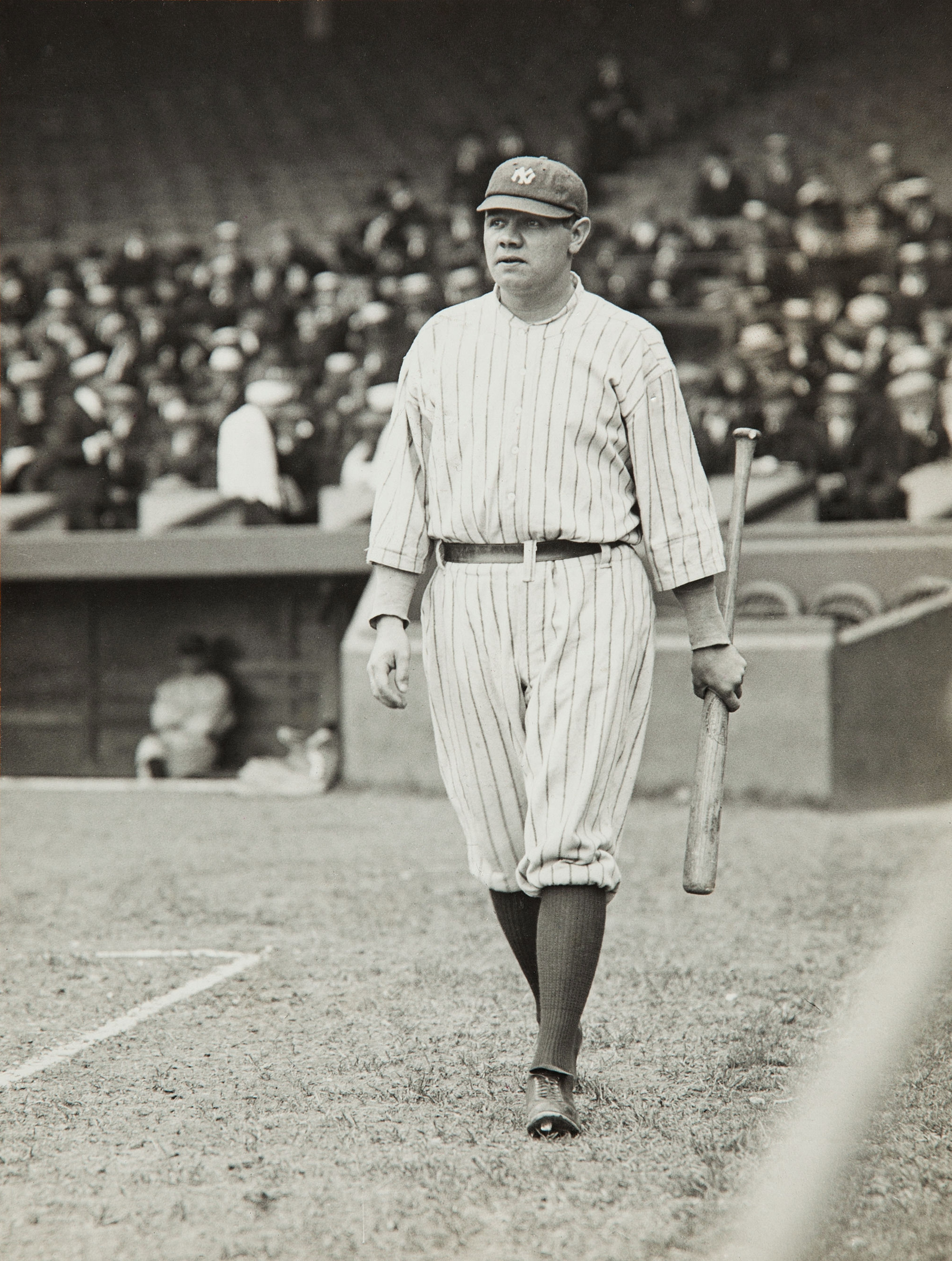
Hank Aaron (left) and Babe Ruth hold the MLB records for total bases in a career and in a single season, 6,856 and 457, respectively.
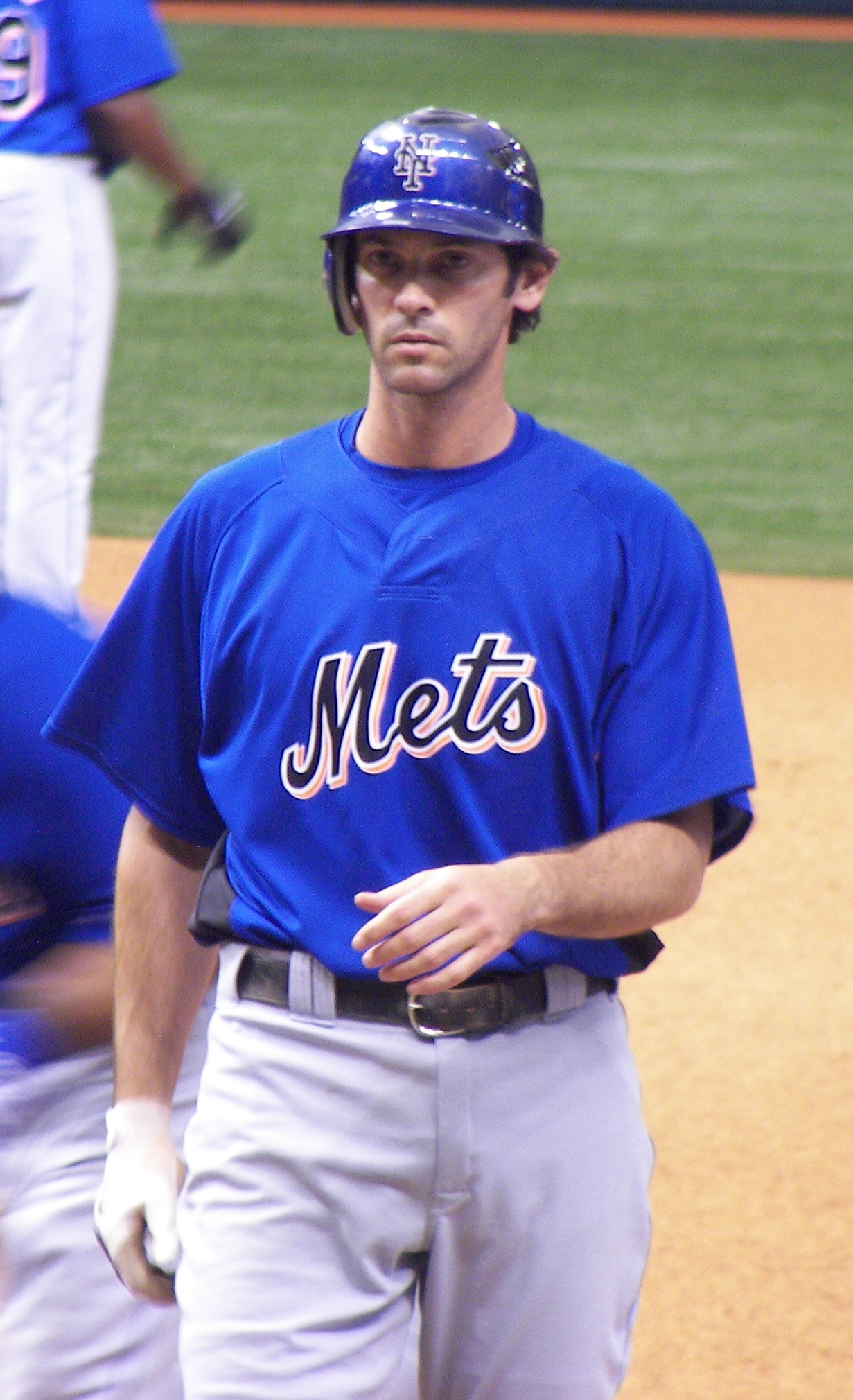
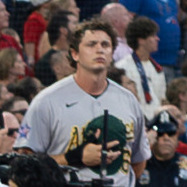
Shawn Green (pictured) and Nick Kurtz hold the records for total bases in a single game for the National League and American League, both hitting 19.

Hank Aaron's 6,856 career total bases make him the all-time MLB record holder. Having spent the majority of his career playing in the National League, he also holds that league's record with 6,591 total bases. Aaron hit for 300 or more total bases in a record 15 different seasons. Aaron regarded this record as his proudest accomplishment, over his career home run record, because he felt it better reflected his performance as a team player. Ty Cobb's 5,854 total bases constitute the American League record. Freddie Freeman is the active leader and 110th all-time with 3,866 total bases, as of the 2024 MLB season.

The single season MLB and American League records are held by Babe Ruth, who hit for 457 TB in the 1921 season. The following season saw Rogers Hornsby set the National League record when he hit for 450 total bases. So far, the most recent player to have 400 bases in a single season is Shohei Ohtani, who had 411 bases in the 2024 season.

Shawn Green and Nick Kurtz hold the single game total bases record of 19 TB. Green hit four home runs, a single and a double for the Los Angeles Dodgers against the Milwaukee Brewers on May 23, 2002 (this topped the previous record held by Joe Adcock, who had 18 total bases for the Milwaukee Braves on July 31, 1954). Kurtz hit four home runs, a single and a double for the Athletics on July 25, 2025, in a game versus the Houston Astros.

The record for interleague game is jointly held by Dustin Pedroia, Kyle Schwarber, and Shea Langeliers, who all had 15 total bases on three home runs, a single, and a double; Pedroia recorded his on June 24, 2010, while Schwarber recorded his on September 3, 2024 and Langeliers recorded his on August 5, 2025.

The 2003 Boston Red Sox and 2019 Minnesota Twins jointly hold the American League single season team record with 2,832 total bases; the National League record is held by the 2001 Colorado Rockies (2,748 TB). The Red Sox also have the record for most total bases by a team in one game: they hit for 60 TB in a 29–4 victory over the St. Louis Browns on June 8, 1950.

Among major league pitchers, Phil Niekro gave up the most total bases in a career (7,473), while Robin Roberts (555 TB allowed in 1956) holds the single season record. The record number of total bases allowed in a single game by one pitcher is 42, by Allan Travers of the Detroit Tigers.

=== Postseason ===
Two players have hit for 14 total bases in a postseason game. Albert Pujols is the only player to accomplish this in the World Series, doing so for the St. Louis Cardinals in Game 3 of the 2011 World Series, when he had two singles and three home runs. Bob Robertson also achieved the feat while playing for the Pittsburgh Pirates in Game 2 of the 1971 National League Championship Series, with a double and three home runs. Randy Arozarena holds the record for a single postseason, with 64 total bases during the 2020 playoffs for the Tampa Bay Rays, while Derek Jeter has the career postseason record of 302 total bases, all with the New York Yankees.

The Boston Red Sox hit for 45 total bases in their 23–7 victory over the Cleveland Indians in Game 4 of the 1999 American League Division Series, a postseason record. The most total bases by a team in a World Series game is 34, by the Atlanta Braves in Game 5 of the 1991 World Series, when they beat the Minnesota Twins by a score of 14–5.

=== All-Star Games ===
Ted Williams hit for a record 10 total bases (two singles and two home runs) in the All-Star Game when representing the American League in the 1946 edition. The 1954 edition, when the American League had 29 and the National League had 23, produced the most total bases in a single All-Star Game, 52. The most total bases by one team in an All-Star Game is 29, achieved by the American League in both the 1954 and 1992 editions. The National League had a high of 25 total bases in the 1951 game.
