= Marcell Ozuna =

Dominican baseball player (born 1990)

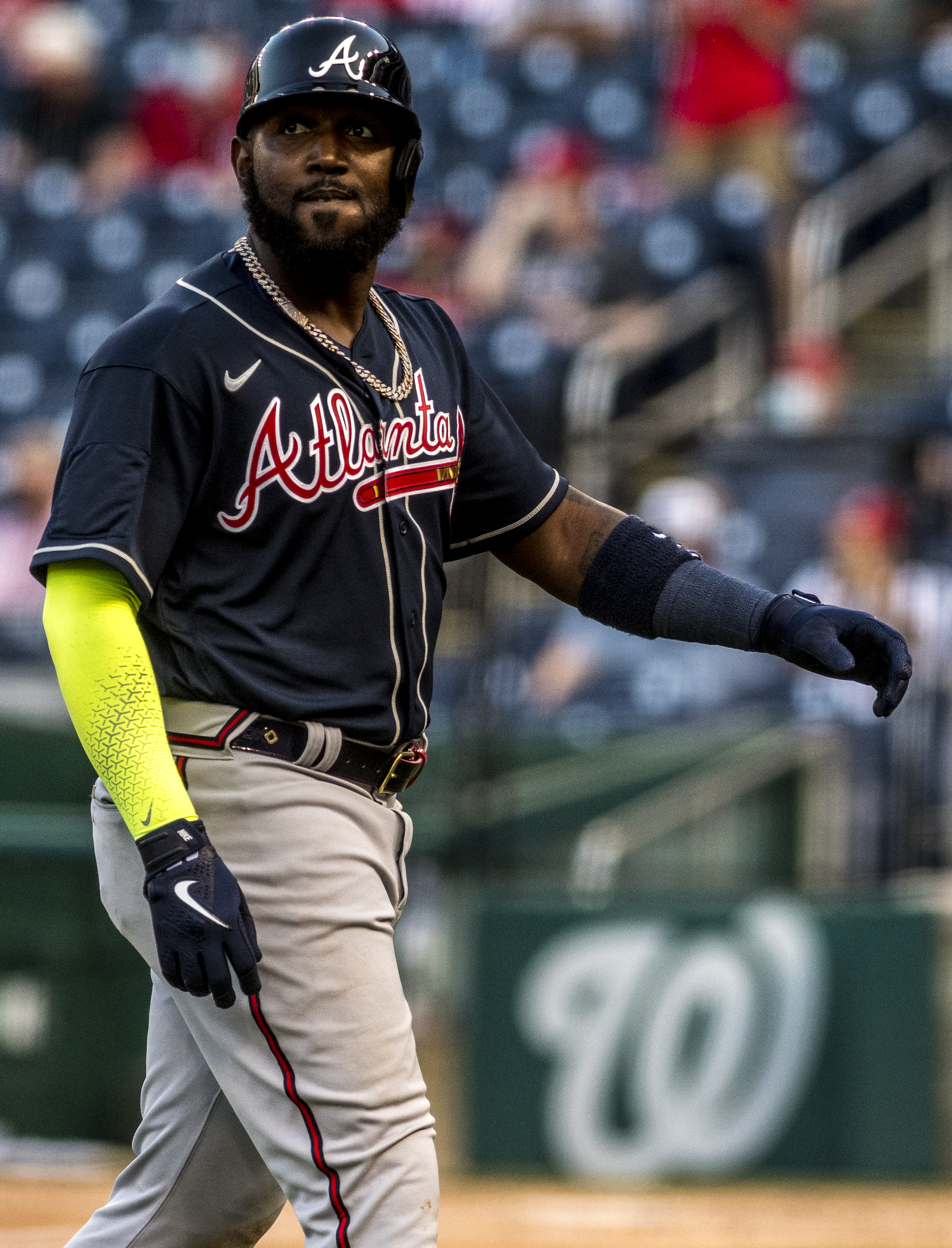
- Ozuna with the Atlanta Braves in 2021

Free agent
- Designated hitter / Outfielder
- Born: November 12, 1990 (age 36); Santo Domingo, Dominican Republic
- Bats: Right Throws: Right

MLB debut
- April 30, 2013, for the Miami Marlins

MLB statistics (through 2026 season)
- Batting average: .267
- Hits: 1,678
- Home runs: 304
- Runs batted in: 977
- Stats at Baseball Reference

Teams
- Miami Marlins (2013–2017); St. Louis Cardinals (2018–2019); Atlanta Braves (2020–2025); Pittsburgh Pirates (2026)

Career highlights and awards
- 3× All-Star (2016, 2017, 2024); All-MLB First Team (2020); Gold Glove Award (2017); 2× Silver Slugger Award (2017, 2020); NL home run leader (2020); NL RBI leader (2020)

Marcell Ozuna Idelfonso (born November 12, 1990), nicknamed "the Big Bear", is a Dominican professional baseball designated hitter and outfielder who is a free agent. He has previously played in Major League Baseball (MLB) for the Miami Marlins, St. Louis Cardinals, Atlanta Braves, and Pittsburgh Pirates. He made his MLB debut in 2013 with the Marlins.

Ozuna was signed by the Marlins as an amateur free agent in 2008. He is a three-time MLB All-Star (2016, 2017, 2024), a two-time Silver Slugger (2017, 2020) and Gold Glove winner in 2017, his breakout season. That year, he finished fourth in the National League (NL) in batting average (.312), and third in home runs (37) and runs batted in (124). Following the 2017 season, the Marlins traded Ozuna to the St. Louis Cardinals. In 2020 he led the NL in both home runs and RBI.

== Early life and family ==
Marcell Ozuna Idelfonso was born in Santo Domingo, Dominican Republic. His father is a former painter, and his mother is a housekeeper. He has one brother and two sisters. He is a cousin of former MLB player Pablo Ozuna.

== Professional career ==
=== Minor leagues ===
On February 15, 2008, the Florida Marlins signed Ozuna as an international free agent with a $49,000 bonus. He played for the Dominican Summer League (DSL) Marlins that year, where in 63 games, he hit .279 with six home runs and 43 runs batted in (RBI) and eight stolen bases. In 2009, he played for the Gulf Coast League Marlins, where in 55 games, he hit .313 with five home runs and 39 RBI.

Ozuna began 2010 with the Greensboro Grasshoppers of the Single–A South Atlantic League, but was sidelined after six appearances with an injured wrist. He returned in June with Short Season Jamestown, where he finished the season. In 74 total games, he hit .258 with 22 home runs and 62 RBI. Ozuna spent 2011 with Greensboro, where he hit .266 with 23 home runs, 71 RBI, and 17 stolen bases over 131 games.

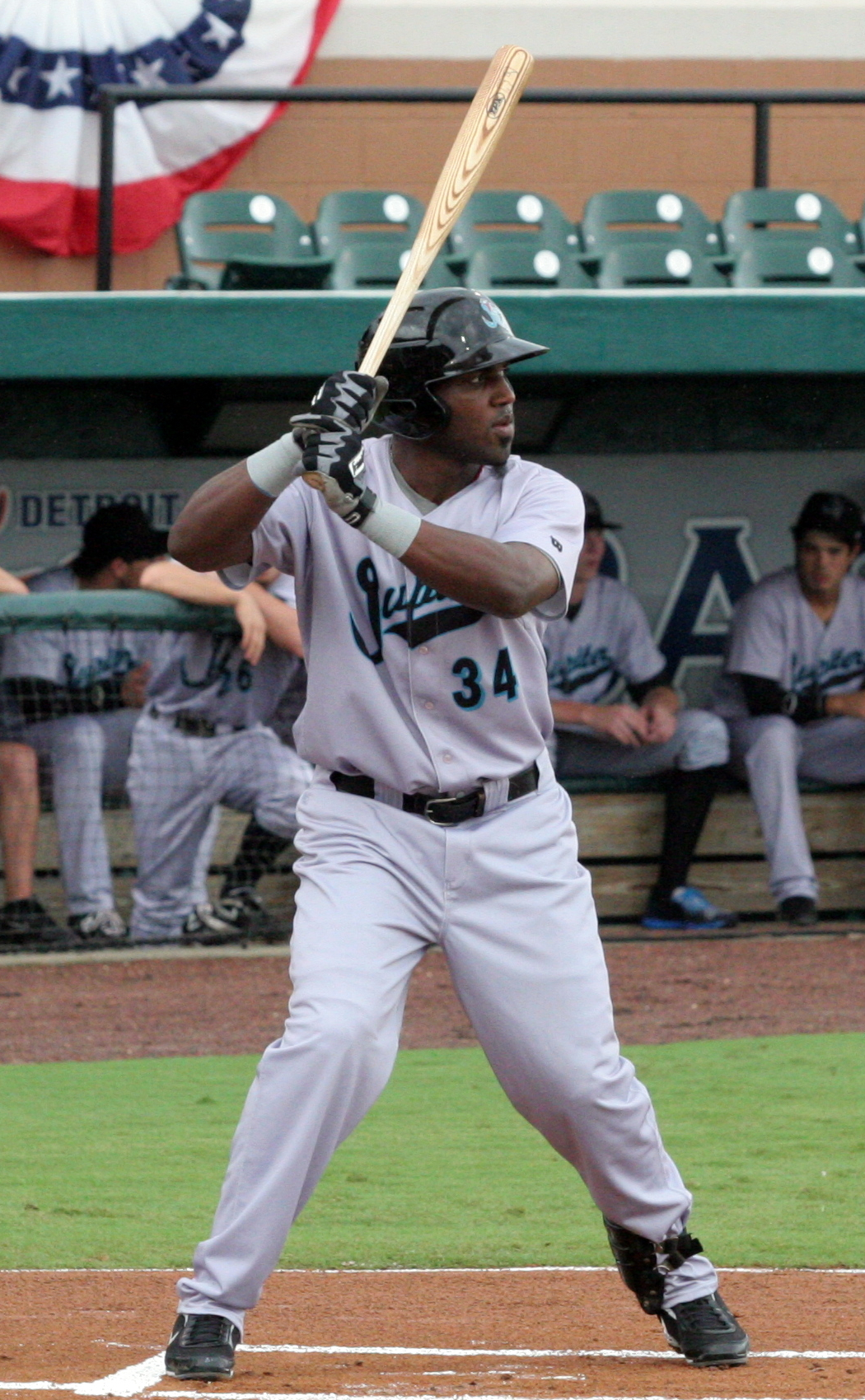
Ozuna with the Jupiter Hammerheads in 2012

Ozuna was promoted to Jupiter Hammerheads of the High–A Florida State League for the 2012 season, where in 129 games, he hit .266 with 24 home runs and 95 RBI. That year, he led the Florida State League in home runs, RBI, runs scored, and total bases. Ozuna was added to the Marlins' 40-man roster on November 20, 2012. Baseball America rated Ozuna the 75th-best prospect in baseball prior to the 2013 season.

Ozuna opened 2013 with Jupiter, but after four games, he was promoted to the Jacksonville Suns of the Double–A Southern League. Ozuna was named the league's player of the week on April 29, 2013. That same day, the Marlins promoted Ozuna to the major leagues following an injury to Giancarlo Stanton.

=== Miami Marlins (2013–2017) ===
On April 30, 2013, Ozuna made his major league debut, and recorded his first career hit, a single off Jeremy Hefner of the New York Mets. He hit his first career home run (as well as his first RBI and run scored), a solo home run, off Cole Hamels of the Philadelphia Phillies, in his fifth game. Ozuna was used as the starting right fielder in Stanton's absence. When Stanton returned, Ozuna became the starting center fielder. On July 22, Ozuna was optioned back to Jacksonville. Instead of joining Jacksonville, Ozuna was placed on the 15-day disabled list due to a ligament tear and avulsion fracture in his left thumb, which he injured while making a diving catch. On July 26, he underwent season-ending thumb surgery.

In 2014, Ozuna played a total of 153 games for the Marlins, batting .269 with 23 home runs and 85 RBI. On September 11, 2014, he tied a franchise record with home runs in four consecutive games.

On July 5, 2015, Ozuna was sent down to Triple–A after going hitless in nine of ten games, dipping his average to .249 on the season. After playing 33 games and batting .333 with five home runs and 11 RBI, he returned to the Marlins to complete the 2015 season, batting .278 with six home runs and 18 RBI.

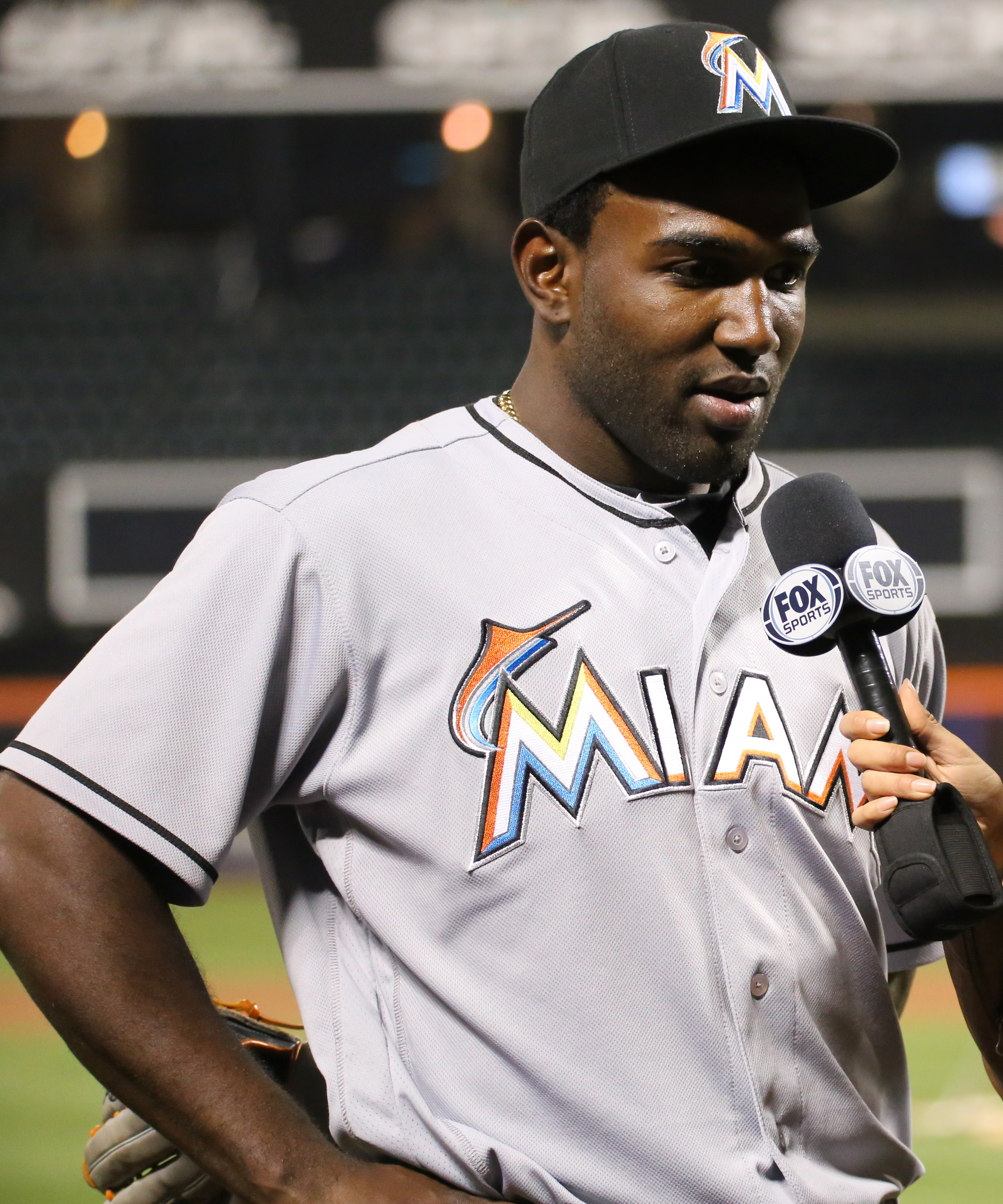
Ozuna with the Miami Marlins in 2016.

During the offseason, the Marlins received several offers for Ozuna from other teams, but he was back on the roster for the 2016 season and inserted in the number-two spot in the lineup.

In 2017, Ozuna was named NL Player of the Week for the week of April 10–16 after batting .435 with four home runs, 12 RBI, and a 1.481 OPS.

Ozuna was named a starter for the NL in the 2017 MLB All-Star Game. Of the NL All-Star selections, he was one of eight to hit at least 35 home runs, but Ozuna was one of just four to walk at a rate of at least nine percent while striking out less than 22 percent. He established career highs in numerous categories, including batting .312 with 37 home runs and 124 RBI. He was named the NL Player of the Week along with teammate Giancarlo Stanton once again for the week of September 18–24 after batting .500 (10–20) with three home runs, seven RBI, and six runs scored.

=== St. Louis Cardinals (2018–2019) ===
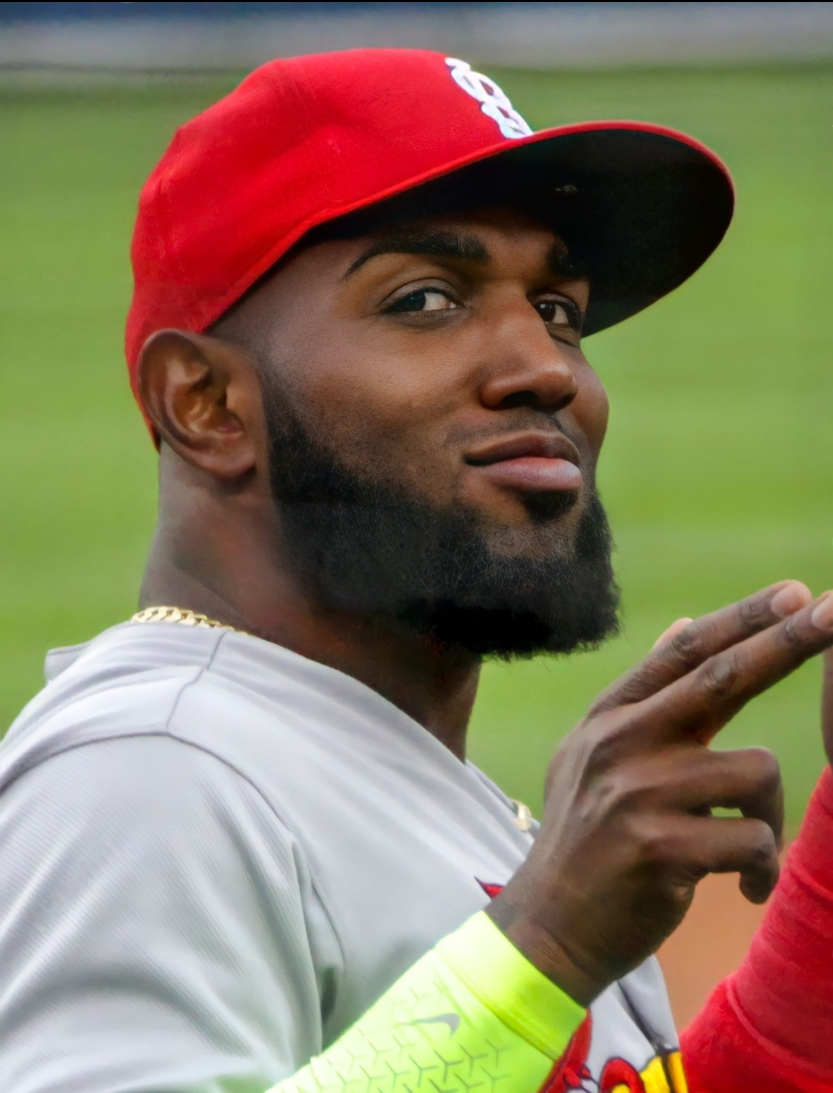
Ozuna with the St. Louis Cardinals in 2018

On December 14, 2017, the Marlins traded Ozuna to the St. Louis Cardinals in exchange for Sandy Alcántara, Magneuris Sierra, Zac Gallen, and Daniel Castano. On January 12, 2018, it was announced that the Cardinals and Ozuna reached agreement on a one-year, $9 million contract. Prior to the 2018 season, Mike Petriello of MLB.com rated Ozuna the best left fielder in the major leagues, opining him as "a strong fielder," and averaging the 12th-highest exit velocity [91 miles per hour (146 km/h)] over the prior three seasons of all hitters with at least 1,000 plate appearances.

On June 2, 2018, Ozuna hit his 100th career home run, off Chad Kuhl, in a 3–2 victory over the Pittsburgh Pirates, and first home run at Busch Stadium as a member of the Cardinals. The following day, he hit a grand slam in a 5–0 win against the Pirates.

Ozuna was named NL Player of the Week for the week of June 11–17, hitting .455/.478/1.000 (10-for-22, 1.478 OPS), with four home runs and eight RBI in six games. This was his third Player of the Week award after winning it twice with the Miami Marlins during the 2017 season, in mid-April and early September. On July 30, at Busch Stadium versus the Colorado Rockies, Ozuna hit his first walk-off home run, a solo shot in the 10th inning, helping St. Louis defeat the Rockies 5–4. Ozuna finished his first season in St. Louis batting .280 with 23 home runs and 88 RBI in 148 games.

Ozuna was placed on the injured list on June 29, 2019, with a finger fracture, and was activated on August 3. Over 130 regular season games and 485 at bats, Ozuna slashed .243/.330/.804 with 29 home runs and 89 RBI.

With the Cardinals reaching the 2019 National League Division Series, Ozuna played in his first career postseason series. In the five games against the Atlanta Braves, Ozuna hit .429 with nine hits and five RBI.

=== Atlanta Braves (2020–2025) ===
On January 21, 2020, Ozuna signed a one-year contract worth $18 million with the Atlanta Braves. On July 24, Ozuna was the starting left fielder, making his Braves debut on the pandemic-shortened season's Opening Day. On September 1, he became the first National League player to hit three home runs in one game at Fenway Park, and also reached 1,000 MLB career hits. When Adam Duvall hit three home runs in the next game, also against the Boston Red Sox, Ozuna and Duvall became the first teammates in Major League Baseball history to have hit three home runs each in consecutive games.

In 2020, Ozuna batted .338/.431/.636 (each third in the NL) with an NL-leading 18 home runs, 56 RBI, and 145 total bases during the shortened 60-game season. Ozuna won his second Silver Slugger Award after the 2020 season; it was the first-ever Silver Slugger for designated hitter in the National League as a result of the universal DH rule implemented league-wide during the COVID-19 pandemic-shortened 2020 season.

On February 5, 2021, Ozuna re-signed with the Braves with a four-year, $64 million contract. On September 9, he was put on administrative leave due to domestic violence against his wife. He did not play for the remainder of the season. The Braves finished with an 88–73 record, clinching the NL East, and eventually won the 2021 World Series, their first title since 1995. In 2021 he batted .213/.288/.356.

In the 2022 season, he played 124 games and hit 23 home runs while striking out 122 times to bat .226/.274/.413 in 470 at-bats. Ozuna hit two home runs in the 2023 regular-season finale to finish with a career-high 40 home runs. His two October 1 homers also helped the 2023 Braves tie the 2019 Minnesota Twins for most home runs hit in a season. During the 2024 season, Ozuna was one of the few bright spots in Atlanta's injury-plagued lineup. He finished the season batting .302 with 39 home runs, 104 RBI, and a .925 OPS. Ozuna also finished fourth in NL MVP voting. In the 2025 season, he hit .232 with 21 homers and 68 RBI in 145 games.

=== Pittsburgh Pirates (2026) ===
On February 16, 2026, Ozuna signed a one-year contract with the Pittsburgh Pirates. He made 70 appearances for the Pirates and posted a career-low offensive slump. Slashing .203/.286/.327 with eight home runs and 29 RBI. Ozuna was released by Pittsburgh on August 5.

== Personal life ==
Ozuna is married to Genesis Guzman. As of May 2017, the couple have three children.

=== Incidents ===
On May 29, 2021, Ozuna was arrested and charged with aggravated assault by strangulation and battery after Sandy Springs Police claimed to witness him grabbing his wife by the neck and throwing her against a wall. The charges were later withdrawn after completion of a diversion program. This resulted in Ozuna receiving a 20-game suspension which he served retroactively during the 2021 season.

This followed another incident that occurred almost a year prior when Guzman was arrested on her own domestic battery charge against her husband, hitting him with a soap dish which caused a small laceration on his face.

At 4 a.m. on August 19, 2022, Ozuna was once again arrested, but this time, he was charged with driving under the influence after Norcross Police noticed his inability to stay in his lane. Ozuna was taken into custody on Beaver Ruin Road and booked into the Gwinnett County jail shortly after 4:30 a.m., a Norcross police spokesman told The Atlanta Journal-Constitution. According to an incident report, Ozuna told the arresting officer who pulled him over that he had drunk “three or four” beers earlier in the night. Ozuna was placed under arrest when he refused a breath test.

== See also ==
- Atlanta Braves award winners and league leaders
- List of Major League Baseball players from the Dominican Republic
- List of Major League Baseball career home run leaders
- List of Major League Baseball career strikeouts by batters leaders
- Miami Marlins award winners and league leaders
