= List of Miami Marlins team records =

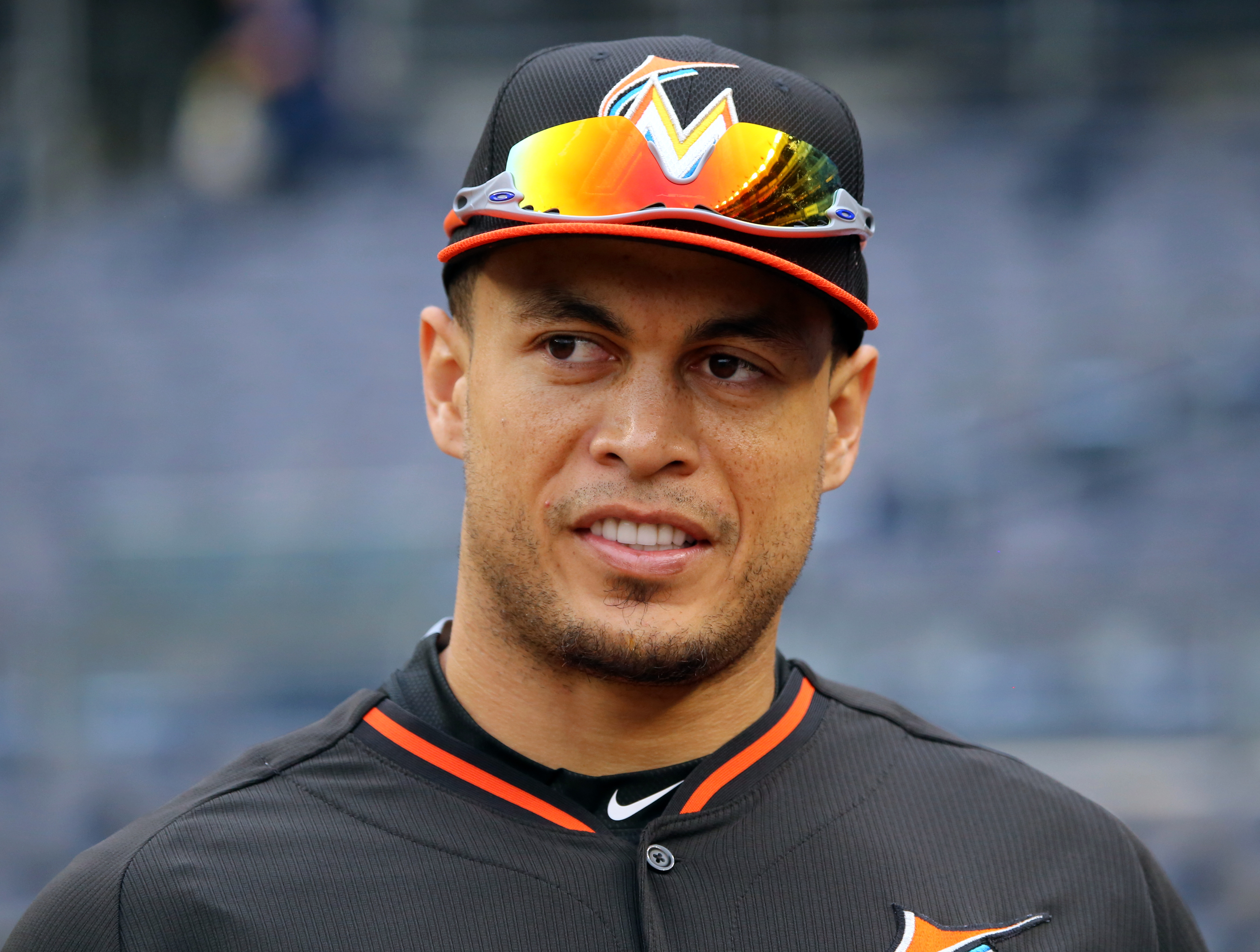
Giancarlo Stanton holds 10 records for the Marlins franchise, the most of any Marlins player.

The Miami Marlins are a Major League Baseball (MLB) franchise based in the U.S. state of Florida. The Marlins became members of MLB as an expansion team in the 1993 season. Through 2017, they have played 3,981 games, winning 1,870 and losing 2,111 for a winning percentage of .470. This list documents the superlative records and accomplishments of team members during their tenures as Marlins in MLB's National League East.

Giancarlo Stanton holds the most franchise records as of the end of the 2018 season, with ten records, including both the most career and single-season home runs, RBI, slugging percentage, and total bases records.

No Marlin holds a Major League or National League record for any of the below statistics. However, the Marlins are tied with the Los Angeles Angels of Anaheim and the Houston Astros for the shortest franchise record losing streak, recording 11 straight losses twice in 1998 and once in June 2011.

== Individual career records ==
Batting statistics; pitching statistics

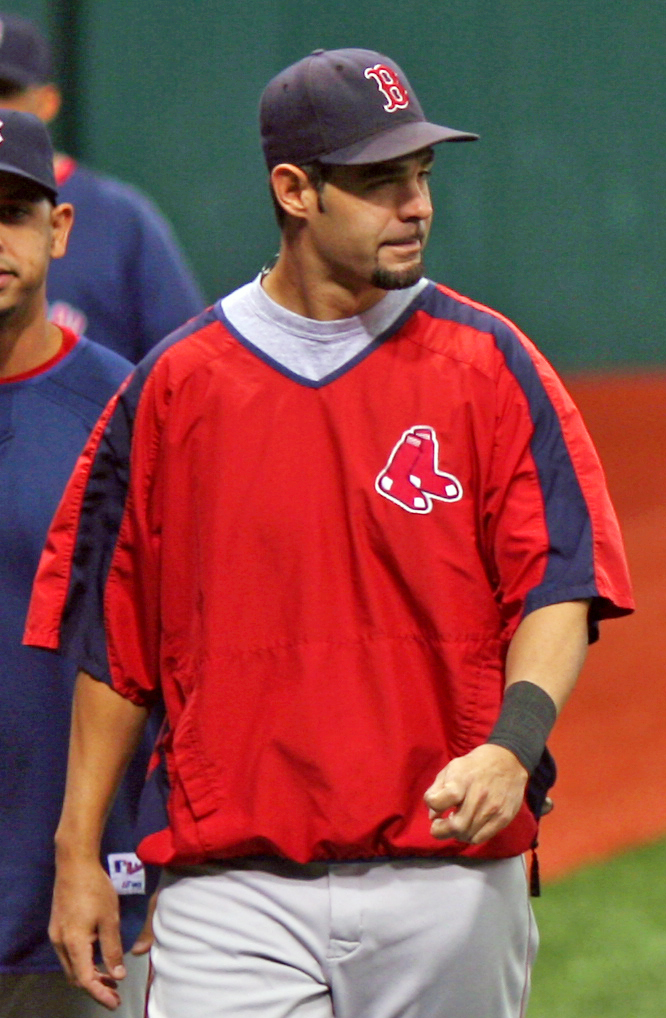
Mike Lowell holds the Marlins' career doubles record

Career batting records
Statistic	Player	Record	Marlins career	Ref
Batting average	Miguel Cabrera	.313	2003-2007	
On-base percentage	Gary Sheffield	.426	1993-1998	
Slugging percentage	Giancarlo Stanton	.554	2010-2017	
OPS	Gary Sheffield	.970	1993-1998	
Hits	Luis Castillo	1,273	1996-2005	
Runs	Luis Castillo	675	1996-2005	
Total bases	Giancarlo Stanton	1,983	2010-2017	
Singles	Luis Castillo	1,081	1996-2005	
Doubles	Mike Lowell	241	1999-2005	
Triples	Luis Castillo	42	1996-2005	
Home runs	Giancarlo Stanton	267	2010-2017	
RBI	Giancarlo Stanton	672	2010-2017	
Bases on balls	Luis Castillo	533	1996-2005	
Strikeouts	Giancarlo Stanton	1,140	2010-2017	
Stolen bases	Luis Castillo	281	1996-2005	

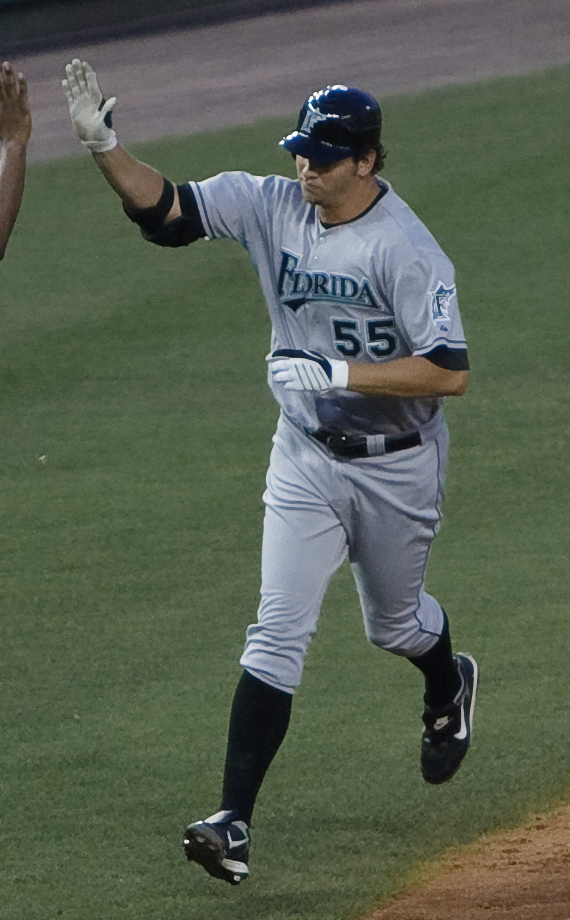
Josh Johnson is the holder of two career records for the Marlins.

Career pitching records
Statistic	Player	Record	Marlins career	Ref
Wins	Ricky Nolasco	81	2006-2013	
Losses	Ricky Nolasco	72	2006-2013	
Win–loss percentage	José Fernández	.691	2013-2016	
ERA	Josh Johnson	3.15	2005-2012	
Saves	Robb Nen	108	1993-1997	
Strikeouts	Sandy Alcantara	1,002	2018–2023 -2025–present	
Shutouts	A. J. Burnett	8*	1999-2005	
Shutouts	Dontrelle Willis	8*	2003-2007	
Games	Mike Dunn	405	2010-2016	
Innings	Ricky Nolasco	1,225 2/3	2006-2013	
Games started	Ricky Nolasco	197	2006-2013	
Complete games	Dontrelle Willis	15	2003-2007	
Walks	Ryan Dempster	395	1998-2002	
Hits allowed	Ricky Nolasco	1,302	2006-2013	
Wild pitches	A. J. Burnett	44	1999-2005	
Hit batsmen	Dontrelle Willis	52	2003-2007	

== Individual single-season records ==
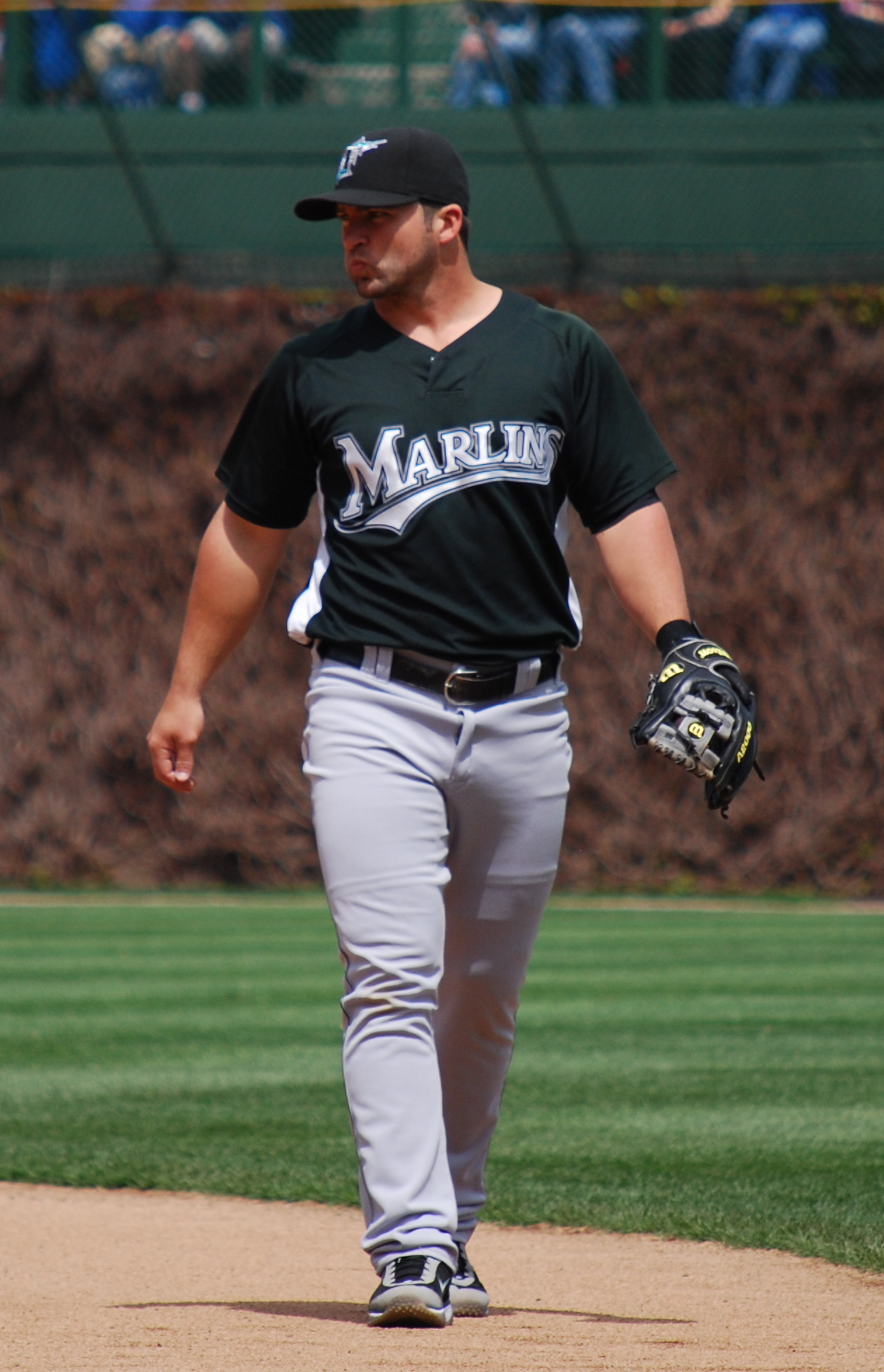
Dan Uggla is the co-holder of the single-season extra-base hits record.

Batting statistics; pitching statistics

Single-season batting records
Statistic	Player	Record	Season	Ref
Batting average	Hanley Ramírez	.342	2009	
Home runs	Giancarlo Stanton	59	2017	
RBI	Giancarlo Stanton	132	2017	
Runs	Hanley Ramírez	125*	2007; 2008	
Hits	Juan Pierre	221	2004	
Singles	Juan Pierre	184	2004	
Doubles	Miguel Cabrera	50	2006	
Triples	Juan Pierre	13	2005	
Stolen bases	Juan Pierre	65	2003	
At bats	Juan Pierre	678	2004	
Slugging percentage	Giancarlo Stanton	.631	2017	
Extra-base hits	Giancarlo Stanton	91	2017	
Total bases	Giancarlo Stanton	377	2017	
On-base percentage	Gary Sheffield	.465	1996	
OPS	Gary Sheffield	1.090	1996	
Walks	Gary Sheffield	142	1996	
Strikeouts	Preston Wilson	187	2000	

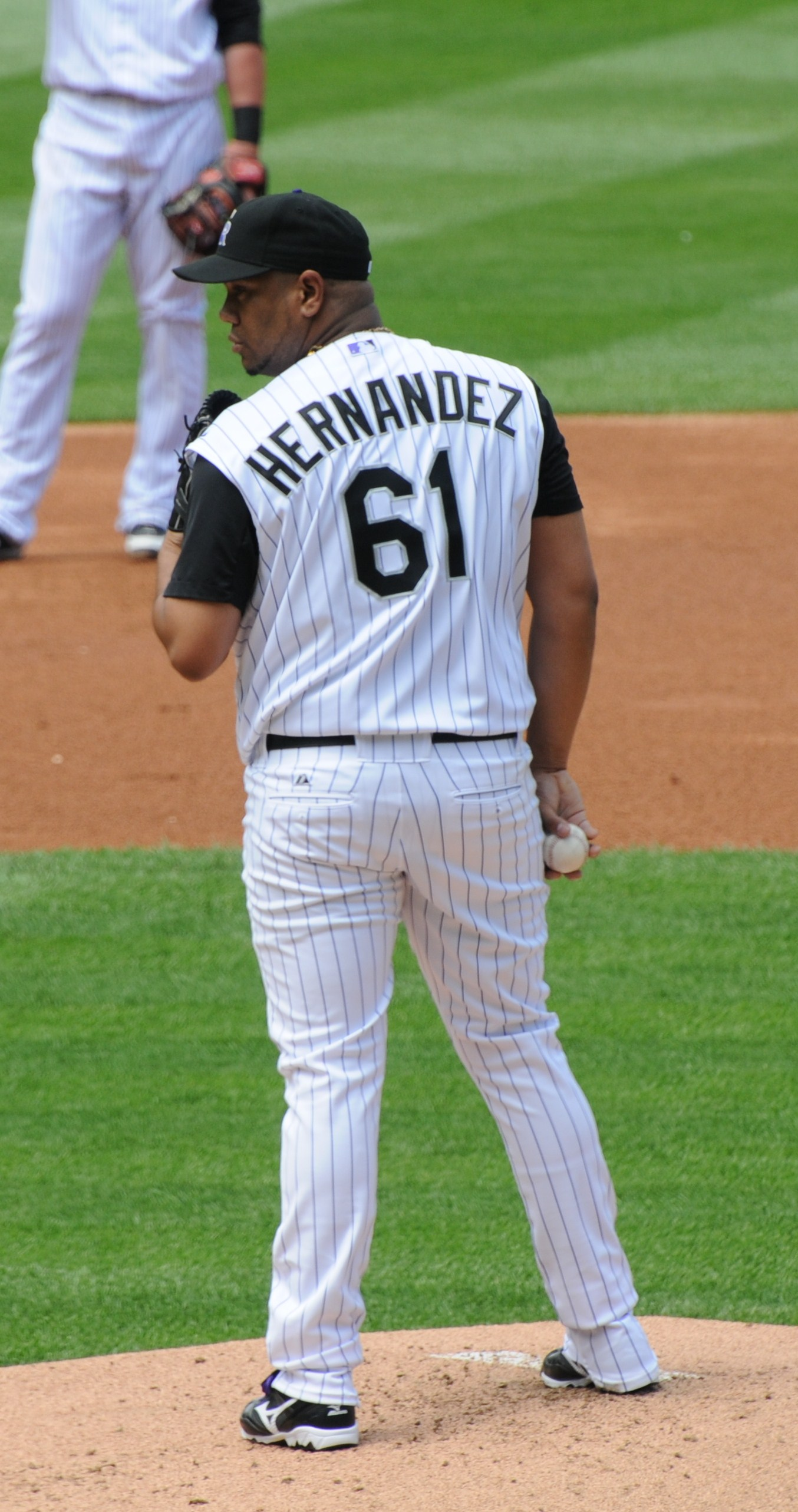
Liván Hernández holds three single-season records for the Florida Marlins

Single-season pitching records
Statistic	Player	Record	Season	Ref
Wins	Dontrelle Willis	22	2005	
Losses	Jack Armstrong	17	1993	
Strikeouts	José Fernández	253	2016	
ERA	Kevin Brown	1.89	1996	
Earned runs allowed	Liván Hernández	123	1998	
Hits allowed	Liván Hernández	265	1998	
Shutouts	A. J. Burnett	5*	2002	
Shutouts	Dontrelle Willis	5*	2005	
Saves	Armando Benítez	47	2004	
Games	Braden Looper	78	2002	
Starts	Dontrelle Willis	35	2007	
Complete games	Liván Hernández	9	1998	
Innings	Kevin Brown	237 1/3	1997	

== Team single-game records ==
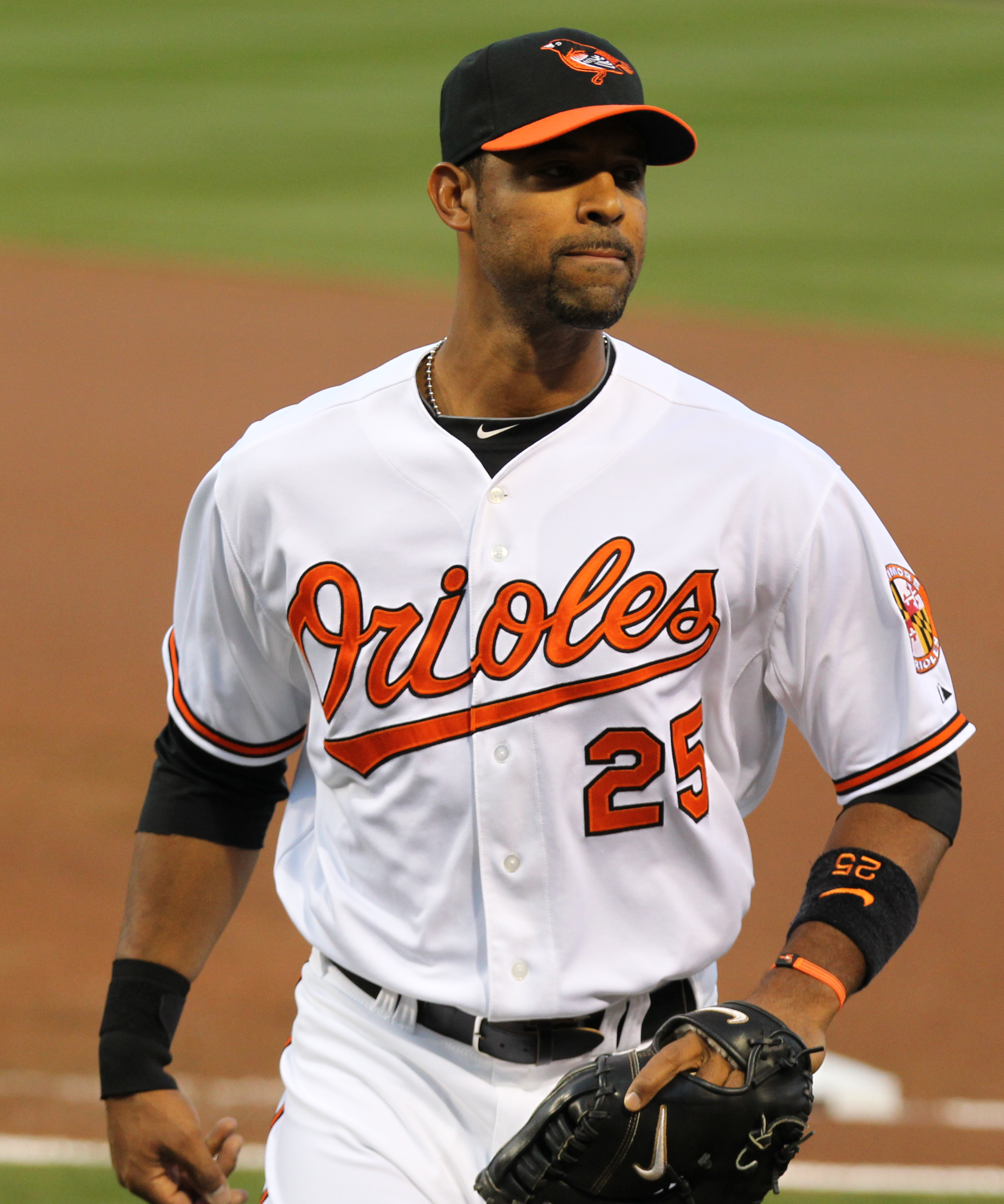
Derrek Lee, the starting first baseman for the Marlins on the record-setting July 1, 2003 game against the Atlanta Braves.

Single-game batting records
Statistic	Record	Opponent	Date
Home runs hit	5	New York Mets	September 11, 2006
Runs scored	22	Texas Rangers	July 26, 2017
Hits	25	Atlanta Braves	July 1, 2003
Triples	4	San Francisco Giants	July 25, 1995
Total bases	46	Texas Rangers	July 26, 2017
Strikeouts	21	Arizona Diamondbacks	September 10, 2000
Stolen bases	10	San Diego Padres	May 18, 2000

Single-game pitching records
Statistic	Record	Opponent	Date
Hits allowed	28	Boston Red Sox	June 27, 2003
Runs allowed	25	Boston Red Sox	June 27, 2003
Home runs allowed	6	Boston Red Sox	June 27, 2003
Base on balls	17	Houston Astros	October 5, 2001
Strikeouts	22	Milwaukee Brewers	June 6, 2005

== Team season records ==
Batting statistics; pitching statistics

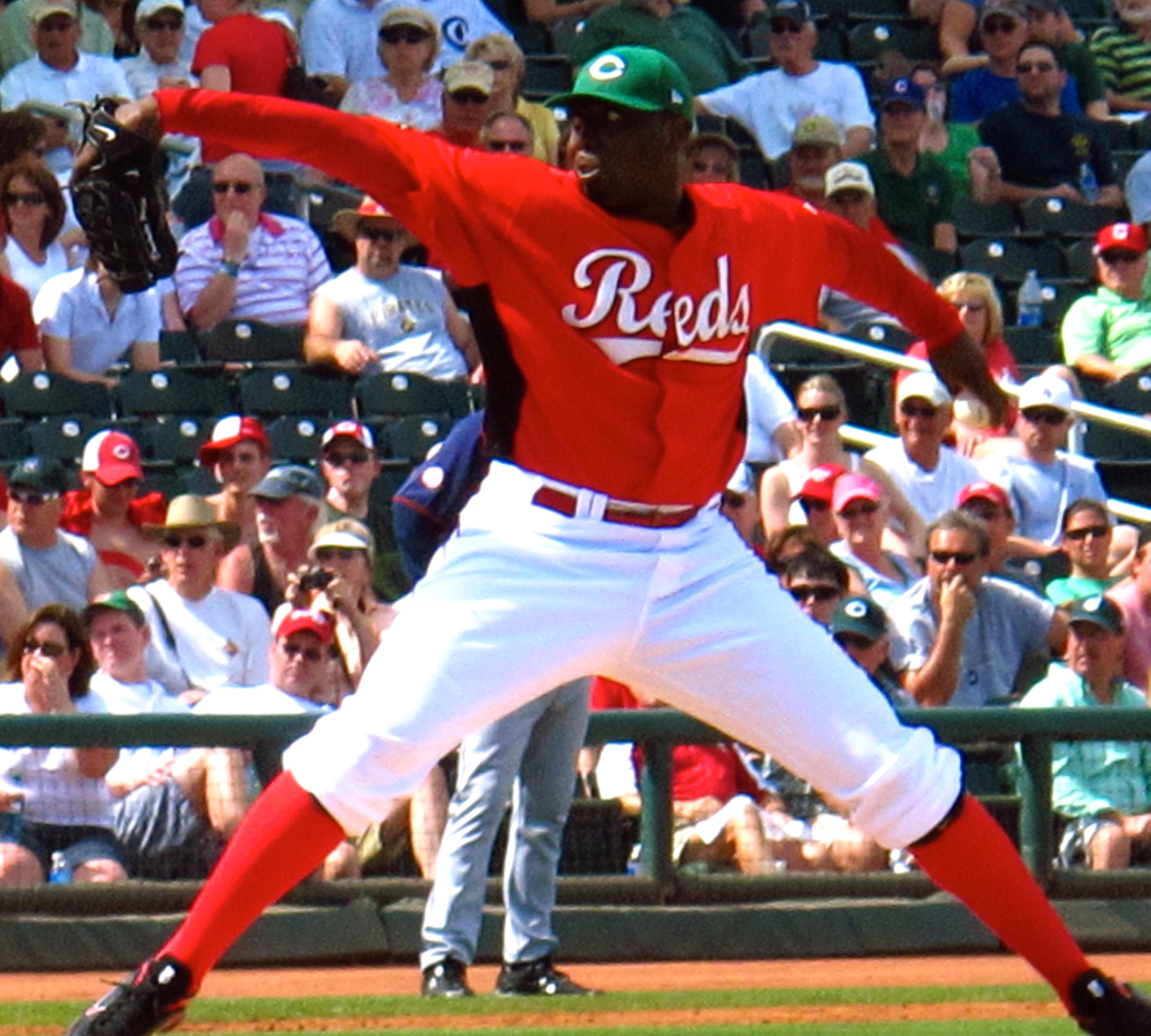
Dontrelle Willis holds 6 franchise records for the Marlins franchise.

Team season batting records
Statistic	Record	Season
Home runs	208	2008
Runs	790	2007
Hits	1,504	2007
Batting average	.272	2005
Walks	686	1997
Strikeouts	1,419	2014
OPS	.784	2007

Team season pitching records
Statistic	Record	Season
Hits allowed	1,617	2007; 1998
Runs allowed	923	1998
Home runs allowed	193	2017
Strikeouts	1,379	2016
ERA	3.71	2013

== See also ==
- Baseball statistics
- Miami Marlins award winners and league leaders
