= Adam Duvall =

American baseball player (born 1988)

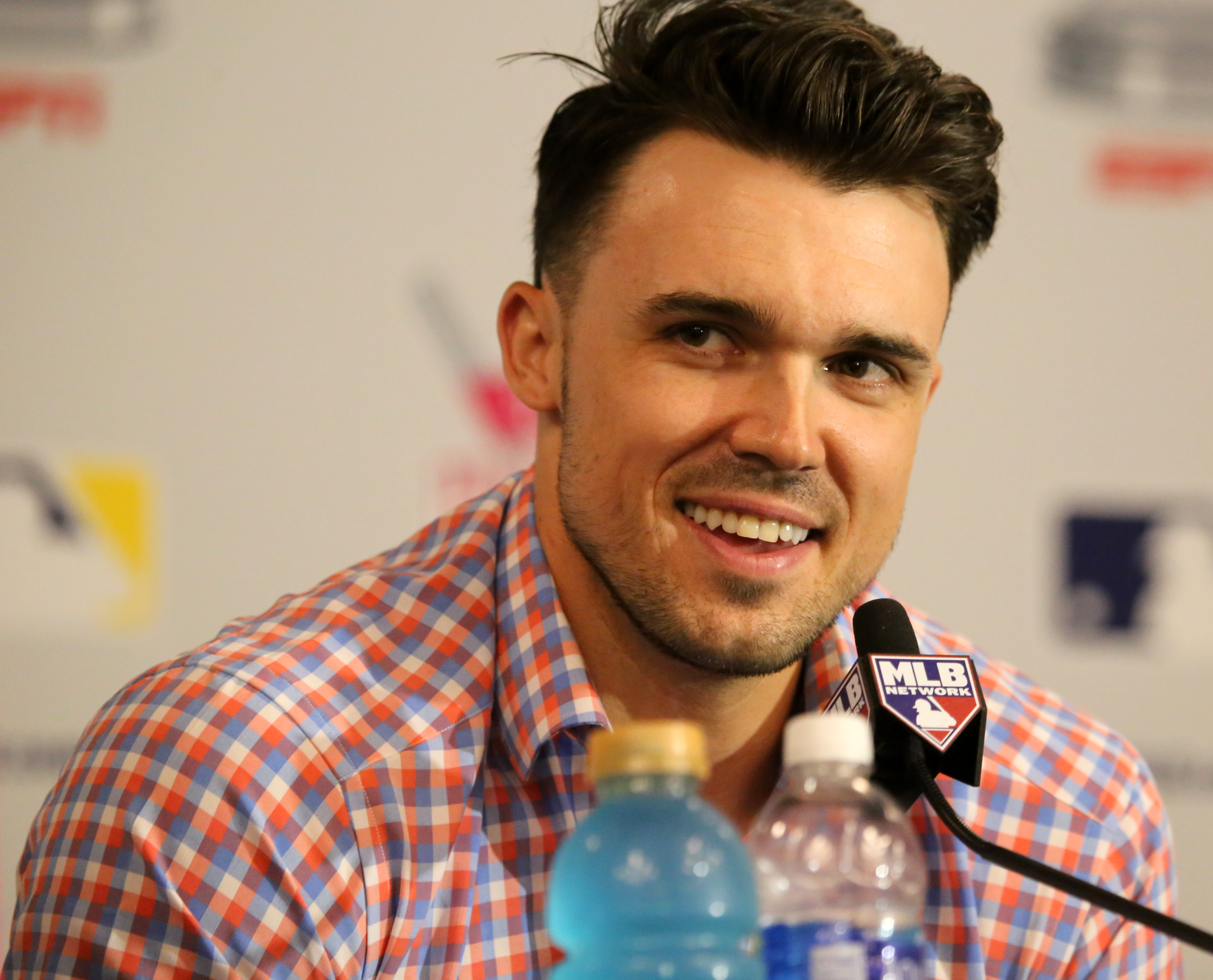
- Duvall in 2016
- Outfielder
- Born: September 4, 1988 (age 38); Louisville, Kentucky, U.S.
- Batted: Right Threw: Right

MLB debut
- June 26, 2014, for the San Francisco Giants

Last MLB appearance
- September 19, 2024, for the Atlanta Braves

MLB statistics
- Batting average: .227
- Home runs: 195
- Runs batted in: 566
- Stats at Baseball Reference

Teams
- San Francisco Giants (2014); Cincinnati Reds (2015–2018); Atlanta Braves (2018–2020); Miami Marlins (2021); Atlanta Braves (2021–2022); Boston Red Sox (2023); Atlanta Braves (2024)

Career highlights and awards
- All-Star (2016); World Series champion (2021); Gold Glove Award (2021); NL RBI leader (2021)

Adam Lynn Duvall (born September 4, 1988) is an American former professional baseball outfielder. He has previously played in Major League Baseball (MLB) for the San Francisco Giants, Cincinnati Reds, Atlanta Braves, Miami Marlins, and Boston Red Sox. Duvall played college baseball at the University of Louisville. Duvall was drafted by the San Francisco Giants in the 11th round of the 2010 MLB draft. He made his MLB debut in 2014. He was an All-Star in 2016.

== Early life ==
Adam Lynne Duvall was born on September 4, 1988, in Louisville, Kentucky, to parents Jeana and Alvin. He has a brother, Austin. Duvall was raised in Louisville, Kentucky, and played baseball at Butler High School. In his junior high school season, he sustained a cracked vertebra. A subsequent surgery prevented him from playing during his senior year of high school.

== College career ==
Duvall played college baseball at Western Kentucky University, Chipola College, and the University of Louisville. He was a business finance major.

== Professional career ==
=== Draft and minor leagues ===
Duvall was drafted by the San Francisco Giants in the 11th round of the 2010 Major League Baseball draft. He signed and made his professional debut that season for the Salem-Keizer Volcanoes. In 54 games, he batted .245 with four home runs and 18 RBIs. He spent 2011 with the Augusta GreenJackets where he slashed .285/.385/.527 with 22 home runs and 87 RBIs in 116 games.

In 2012, he played for the San Jose Giants where he batted .258 and led all Class A players with 30 home runs along with 100 RBIs.

Duvall spent the 2013 season with the Richmond Flying Squirrels, tallying a .252 average, 17 home runs, and 58 RBIs over 105 games. He was out of the lineup for part of April and May after sustaining an injury to his left thumb. Following the season, Duvall was added to the 40-man roster on November 20, 2013. He started the 2014 season with the Triple-A Fresno Grizzlies.

=== San Francisco Giants (2014) ===
The Giants promoted Duvall to the Major Leagues on June 25, 2014. In his first MLB game, Duvall hit a home run off Cincinnati Reds pitcher Mike Leake. He was sent back down to the Grizzlies on July 4 due to the return of Brandon Belt from the disabled list (DL). When Belt was sent back to the DL due to lingering concussion symptoms, Duvall was called back up to the Giants to play first base, alongside Travis Ishikawa, Buster Posey, and Michael Morse. On September 28, Duvall homered off San Diego Padres pitcher Tim Stauffer for his first career pinch-hit home run. Over the course of 2014, Duvall played in 28 games with the Giants, finishing with a .192 batting average, three home runs, and five RBIs. The Giants earned a wild card spot with an 88–74 record and eventually won the 2014 World Series over the Kansas City Royals. Duvall, however, did not make any appearances in the postseason. He began 2015 with the Sacramento River Cats.

=== Cincinnati Reds (2015–2018) ===
On July 30, 2015, the Giants traded Duvall and Keury Mella to the Reds for Mike Leake (the pitcher Duvall had hit his first major league home run off of). Following the trade, Duvall joined the Louisville Bats. On August 31, Duvall was recalled by the Reds to replace an injured Brennan Boesch. As a pinch-hitter, Duvall homered in his first at bat with the Reds. Splitting time between Louisville and Cincinnati, Duvall played in 27 games with the Reds. He posted a .219 batting average, five home runs, and nine RBIs for the Reds.

In 2016, Duvall was included on the Reds' opening day roster. By June, he led the NL in slugging percentage and was tied for first in MLB in home runs. He was selected to the 2016 Major League Baseball All-Star Game as a reserve. Duvall was the first University of Louisville alumnus to become an MLB All-Star. He also participated in the 2016 MLB Home Run Derby, losing to 2015 derby champion Todd Frazier in the semifinals. In his first full season in the majors, Duvall played in 150 games and posted a .241 batting average, 33 home runs, and 103 RBIs.

On April 18, 2017, Duvall hit his first career grand slam off of Kevin Gausman as the Reds won 9–3 over the Baltimore Orioles. On July 14, with the bases loaded, Duvall hit his first career walk-off in the 11th inning off of T. J. McFarland of the Diamondbacks to give Cincinnati a 4–3 victory. Duvall finished 2017 with a .249/.301/.480 slash line to go along with 31 home runs and 99 runs batted in. On May 9, 2018, Duvall hit his first career walk-off home run off A. J. Ramos against the New York Mets to give the Reds a 2–1 victory.

=== Atlanta Braves (2018–2020) ===
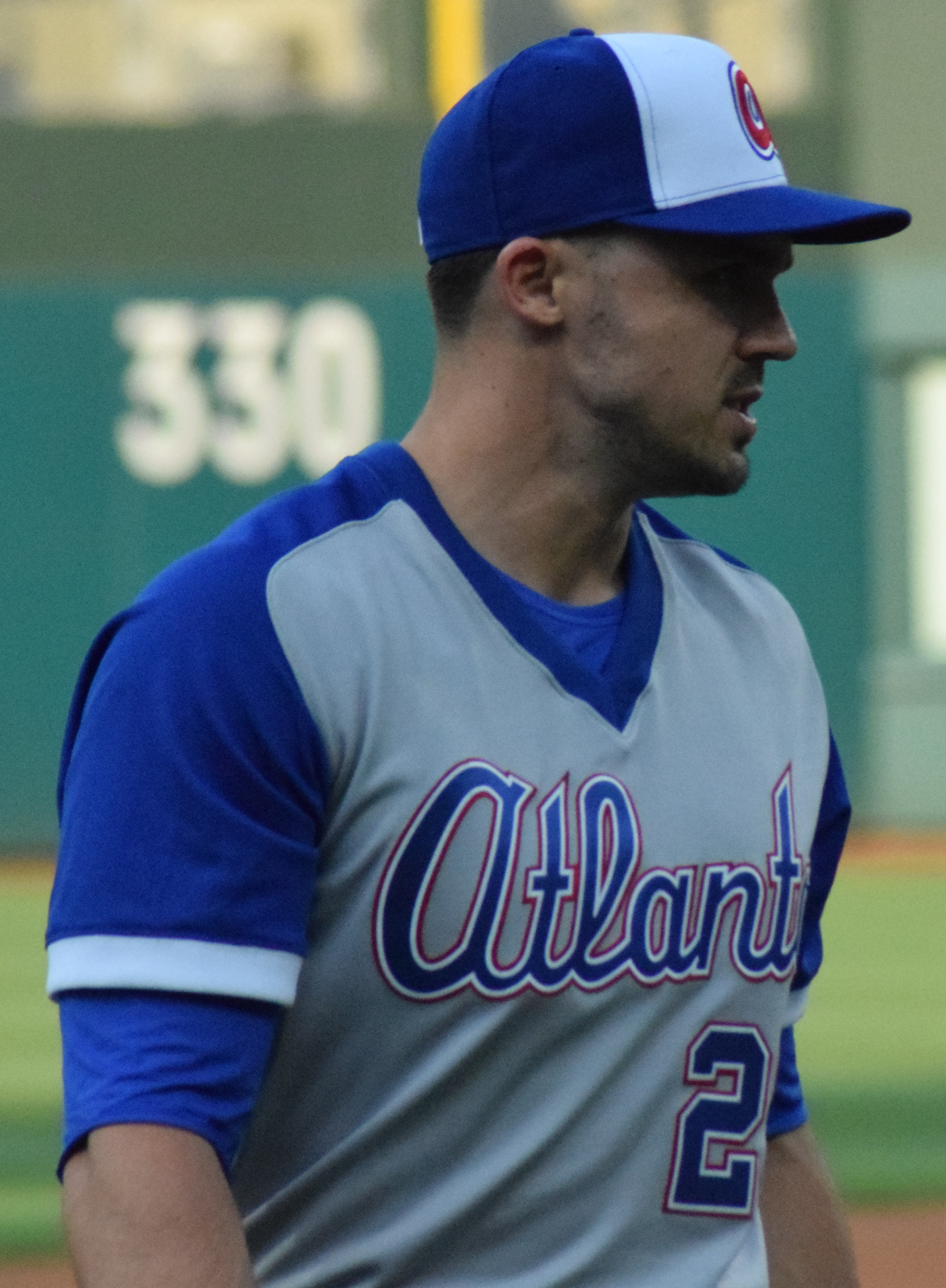
Duvall with the Braves in 2018

On July 30, 2018, Duvall was traded to the Atlanta Braves in exchange for Lucas Sims, Matt Wisler, and Preston Tucker. Duvall struggled in 2018 with the Braves, batting .132 with no home runs or RBIs. In both Atlanta and Cincinnati, Duvall batted just .195 with 15 homers and 61 RBIs.

In 2019, Duvall hit .267/.315/.567 with 10 home runs and 19 RBIs in 120 at bats in 41 games for Atlanta.

Duvall and Marcell Ozuna became the first teammates in MLB history to hit three home runs in consecutive games, when Duvall did so against the Boston Red Sox on September 2, 2020. Ozuna's equivalent feat the previous day was the first time a National League player had hit three home runs in a game at Fenway Park. On September 9, Duvall hit three home runs in a game for the second time, while facing the Miami Marlins. He became the first player in franchise history to have hit three home runs in a game twice. He drove in nine runs, on a two-run home run followed by a three-run home run, then a grand slam. In doing so, Duvall was the first player in MLB history to hit those home runs in such an order.

In 2020 he batted .237/.301/.532 with 34 runs, 16 home runs (3rd in the NL), and 33 RBIs in 190 at bats, and was third in the NL in at bats per home run (11.9). On December 2, Duvall was nontendered by the Braves.

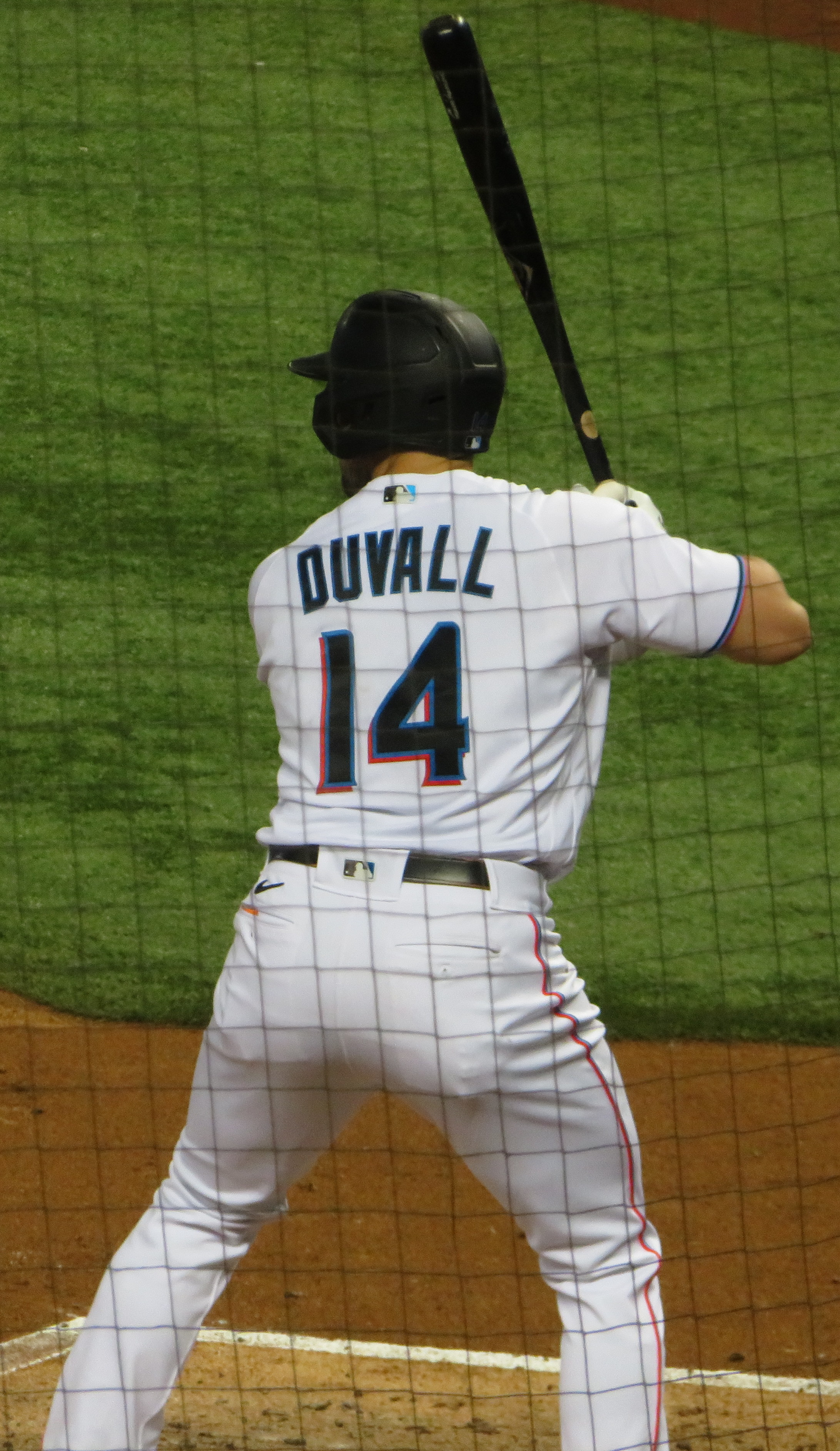
Duvall with the Miami Marlins in 2021

=== Miami Marlins (2021) ===
On February 9, 2021, Duvall signed a one-year, $2 million contract with the Miami Marlins. On May 16 of the same year, he was responsible for securing the victory in the series finale facing the Dodgers, scoring three home runs for the team and hanging on with a score of 3–2.

Duvall had 22 homers and 68 RBIs in 91 games with the team before the Atlanta Braves reacquired him.

=== Second stint with Atlanta Braves (2021–2022) ===
On July 30, 2021, Duvall was traded to the Atlanta Braves in exchange for Alex Jackson. Following the completion of a suspended game against the Braves and San Diego Padres on September 24, 2021, Duvall and Daniel Hudson became the first players in MLB history to play in two games for four different teams on the same day. Duvall and Hudson were members of the Miami Marlins and Washington Nationals, respectively, when the teams faced each other on July 21, 2021. The Braves–Padres game on that same day had been suspended, and by the time it resumed on September 24, 2021, Hudson had joined the Padres and Duvall the Braves.

In 2021, Duvall batted .228/.281/.491 with 38 home runs and 174 strikeouts and led the National League with 113 runs batted in. He had the highest fly ball percentage in the major leagues, at 52.69%.

In Game 5 of the 2021 World Series, he hit a two-out, first-inning grand slam on the first pitch from starting pitcher Framber Valdez, giving the Braves a 4–0 lead. Despite his efforts, the Braves lost 9–5, sending the series to Game 6. Nevertheless, the Braves won Game 6, giving the Braves their first title since 1995 and Duvall's first career World Series championship. At the end of the season, Duvall won the National League Gold Glove Award for right field.

The Braves tendered Duvall a contract in December 2021. His salary for the 2022 season was decided by the arbitration process. He asked for $10.275 million, but received the team's submitted offer $9.275 million when the arbitrator ruled in the Braves' favor. While pursuing a foul ball during a game against the Los Angeles Angels on July 23, Duvall tore the tendon sheath in his left wrist. The injury required surgery, which ended his season.

=== Boston Red Sox (2023) ===
On January 24, 2023, Duvall signed a one-year contract with the Boston Red Sox, reportedly worth $7 million with an additional $3 million possible via potential bonuses. Duvall got off to a hot start in 2023, hitting three home runs (including a walk-off) and driving in 12 runs over his first seven games with the club, the latter of which was a Red Sox record. He was recognized as AL Player of the Week for the first week of the season. However, this success was short lived, as he was placed on the injured list on April 10 due to a distal radius fracture of his left wrist suffered while trying to make a catch in the prior day's game. On May 6, he was transferred to the 60-day injured list. He returned to the team on June 9. For the week of August 21–27, Duvall was again recognized as AL Player of the Week, having hit 14-for-29 with five home runs and 12 RBIs. He became a free agent following the season.

=== Third stint with Atlanta Braves (2024) ===
On March 14, 2024, Duvall signed a one-year, $3 million contract with the Atlanta Braves.

== Personal life ==
Duvall was diagnosed with type 1 diabetes in 2012. He married his wife, Michelle in 2017. They have two sons. They reside in both Nashville and Pinecrest, Florida. On June 20, 2023, he teamed up with Eli Lilly and Company and the American Diabetes Association to launch a nationwide campaign, "Tap the Cap" to increase awareness of insulin affordability solutions for all people living with diabetes. Duvall has been an advocate for the importance of diabetes education.
