= 2016 Major League Baseball Home Run Derby =

Baseball competition

- Date: July 11, 2016
- Venue: Petco Park
- City: San Diego, California
- Winner: Giancarlo Stanton
- Score: 20–13

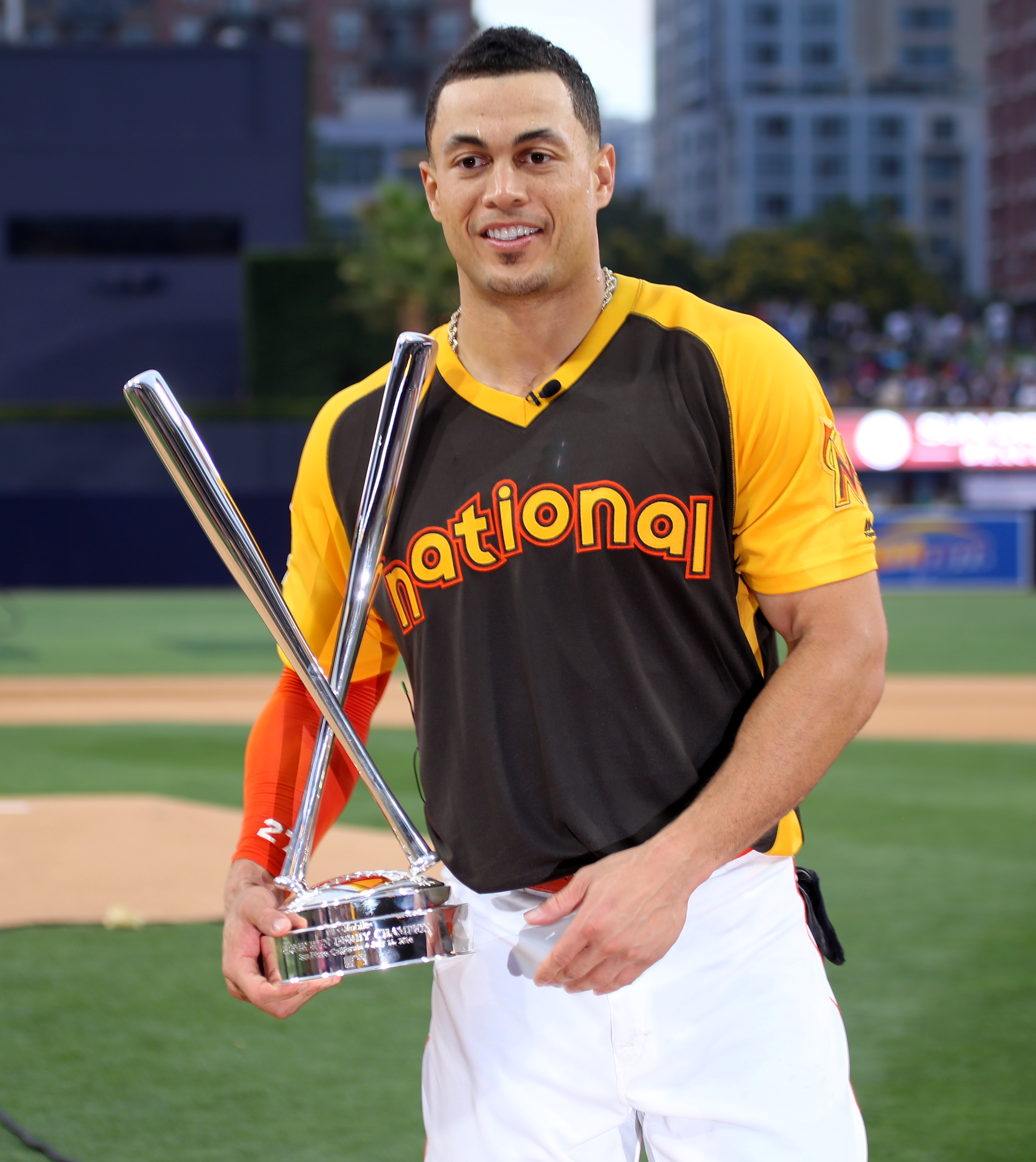
Giancarlo Stanton poses with the trophy after his victory

The 2016 Major League Baseball Home Run Derby (known through sponsorship as the T-Mobile Home Run Derby) was a home run hitting contest between eight batters from Major League Baseball (MLB). The derby was held on July 11, 2016, at Petco Park in San Diego, California, the site of the 2016 MLB All-Star Game. On July 8, the participants that were eligible to participate in the Home Run Derby were announced. Giancarlo Stanton won the Home Run Derby by defeating defending champion Todd Frazier 20–13.

== Rules ==
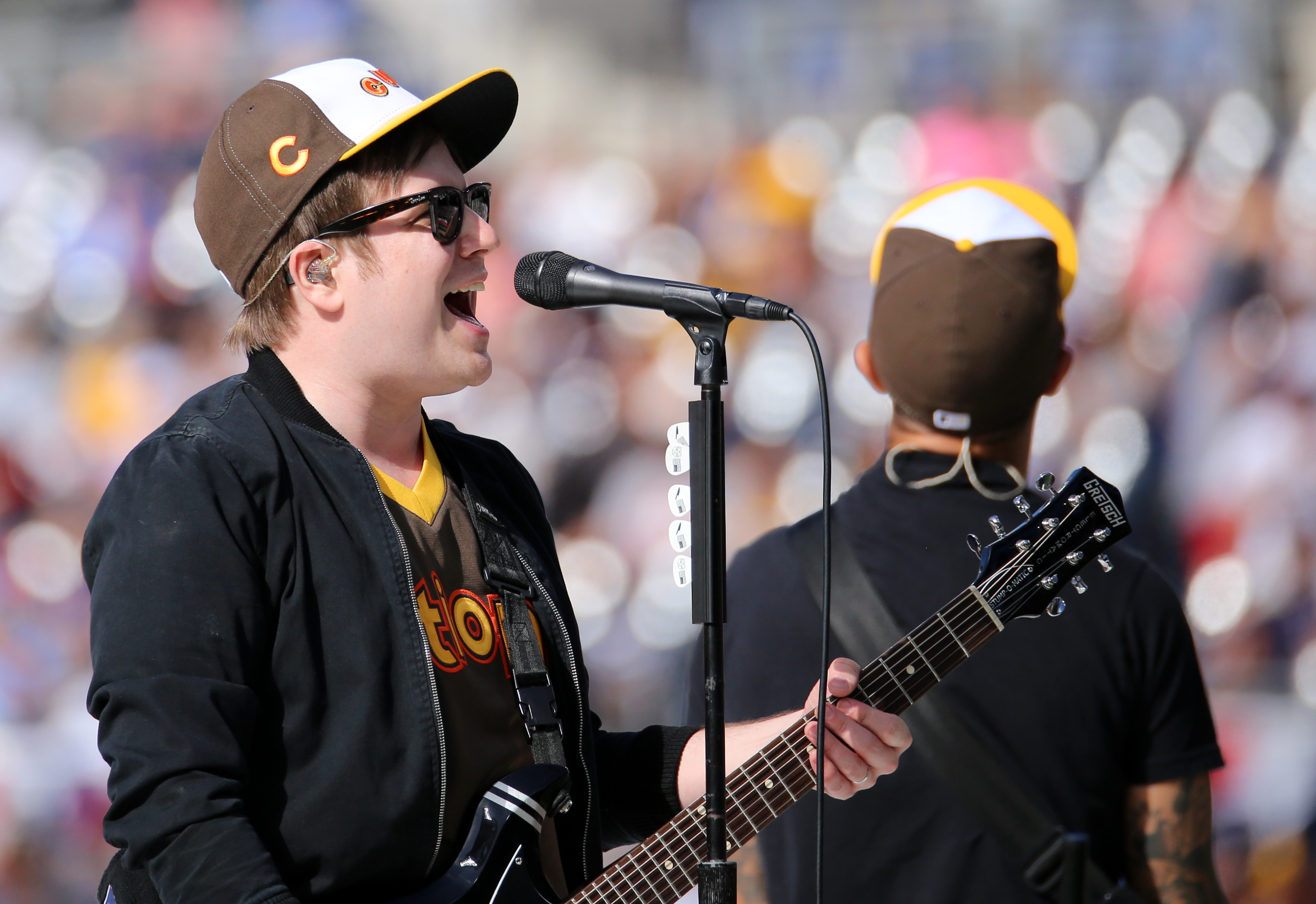
Fall Out Boy performing before the derby

Eight players participated in the derby in a bracket-style, single-elimination timed event. Each player had four minutes to hit as many home runs as possible. Hitters were awarded an additional 30 seconds if they hit two home runs over 440 feet (130 m). Hitters were also allowed one 45 second timeout to stop the clock (two in the finals). Homers hit off a T-Mobile Ball during the final minute resulted in a $10,000 donation to charity by T-Mobile & MLB, to the Boys & Girls Clubs of America.

The eight competing players were seeded 1-8 based on their home run totals. The higher seed hit second in any round, and the round ended if the higher seed surpassed the total of the first hitter. In the event of a tie, the two hitters competed in a one-minute swing-off (with no timeouts nor bonus time awarded). If there remained a tie, each player got three swings; whoever hit more home runs in the three swings would be declared the winner; thereafter, sudden death swings would occur until the tie was broken.

== Results ==
Quarterfinals
1	Mark Trumbo (BAL)	16
8	Corey Seager (LAD)	15
4	Robinson Canó (SEA)	7
5	Giancarlo Stanton (MIA)	24
3	Adam Duvall (CIN)	11
6	Wil Myers (SD)	10
2	Todd Frazier (CWS)	13
7	Carlos González (COL)	12

Semifinals
1	Mark Trumbo	14
5	Giancarlo Stanton	17
3	Adam Duvall	15
2	Todd Frazier	16

Finals
5	Giancarlo Stanton	20
2	Todd Frazier	13
