= Giancarlo Stanton =

American baseball player (born 1989)

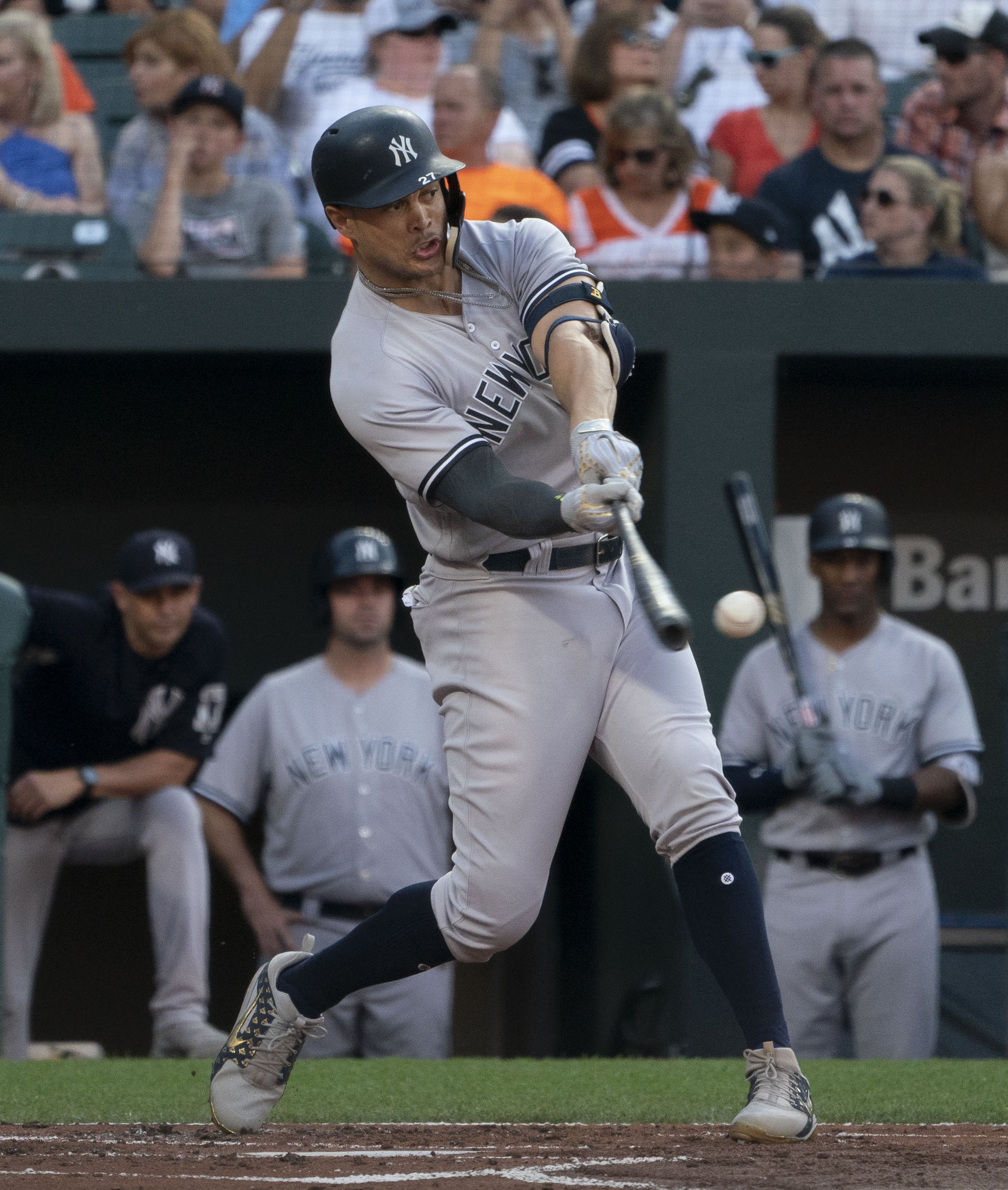
- Stanton with the New York Yankees in 2018

New York Yankees – No. 27
- Designated hitter / Outfielder
- Born: November 8, 1989 (age 37); Panorama City, California, U.S.
- Bats: Right Throws: Right

MLB debut
- June 8, 2010, for the Florida Marlins

MLB statistics (through 2026 season)
- Batting average: .258
- Home runs: 456
- Runs batted in: 1,182
- Stats at Baseball Reference

Teams
- Florida / Miami Marlins (2010–2017); New York Yankees (2018–present)

Career highlights and awards
- 5× All-Star (2012, 2014, 2015, 2017, 2022); NL MVP (2017); ALCS MVP (2024); 2× Silver Slugger Award (2014, 2017); 2× NL Hank Aaron Award (2014, 2017); 2× NL home run leader (2014, 2017); NL RBI leader (2017)
Medals
Men's baseball
Representing United States
World Baseball Classic
Gold medal – first place	2017 Los Angeles	Team

Giancarlo Cruz-Michael Stanton (born November 8, 1989), previously known professionally as Mike Stanton until 2012, is an American professional baseball designated hitter and outfielder for the New York Yankees of Major League Baseball (MLB). He has previously played in MLB for the Florida / Miami Marlins. Stanton stands 6 feet 6 inches (1.98 m) tall and weighs 245 pounds (111 kg). He bats and throws right handed. Stanton is the Marlins' all-time home run leader and the only active player with over 450 home runs. Internationally, Stanton has represented the United States.

Stanton is originally from the Greater Los Angeles region. He graduated from Notre Dame High School in Sherman Oaks, Los Angeles, before the Marlins selected him in the second round of the 2007 MLB draft. He made his MLB debut with the Marlins in 2010. Stanton led the National League in home runs in 2014. In November 2014, the Marlins signed Stanton to the richest total dollar value contract in team sports history at the time of the signing; the contract is worth $325 million over 13 years.

In 2017, Stanton led MLB in home runs (59), runs batted in (RBIs) (132), and slugging percentage (.631), winning the National League Most Valuable Player (MVP) Award. Following the 2017 season, Stanton was traded to the Yankees. A five-time MLB All-Star, Stanton has twice won both the NL Hank Aaron Award and outfield Silver Slugger Award after leading the league in home runs. In 2024, he earned American League Championship Series MVP honors to lift the Yankees to their first American League pennant since 2009.

== Early life ==
Giancarlo Cruz-Michael Stanton was born in Panorama City, California. Stanton's father Mike Stanton is of Irish descent and his mother Jacinta Garay is African-American with some Puerto Rican descent. Stanton's maternal great-great-great-grandmother was Puerto Rican. Stanton's parents have been divorced since Stanton was eight years old. Stanton has a brother, Egidio "E.G." Moacir Garay, and a sister, Kyrice Valivia Stanton. He was raised in the Tujunga area of Los Angeles, and grew up a Los Angeles Dodgers fan. His mother named him after the actors Giancarlo Giannini and Giancarlo Esposito.

Stanton attended Verdugo Hills High School in Tujunga for two years. He transferred to Notre Dame High School in Sherman Oaks where he was a three-sport athlete. In addition to baseball and basketball, Stanton played wide receiver and cornerback for the football team. He had accepted a scholarship to play baseball for USC, and received offers from UCLA and UNLV to play football.

== Professional career ==
=== Draft and the minor leagues ===
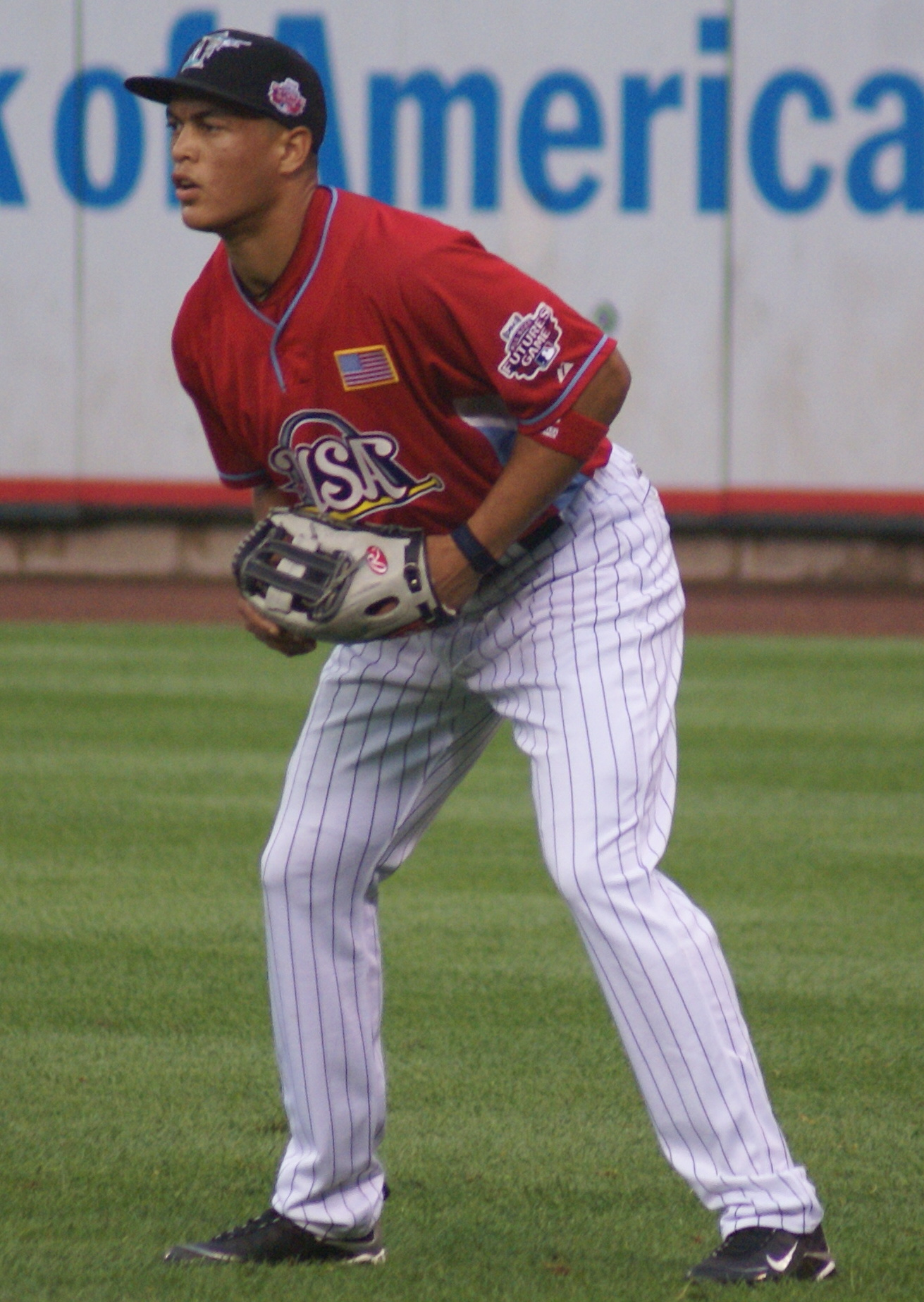
Stanton at the 2009 All-Star Futures Game

The Florida Marlins selected Stanton in the second round, with the 76th overall selection, in the 2007 MLB draft. Rather than enroll in college, Stanton signed with the Marlins, receiving a $475,000 signing bonus.

Stanton began his professional career for the Gulf Coast League Marlins of the Rookie-level Gulf Coast League, but quickly advanced to the Jamestown Jammers of the Low-A New York–Penn League. After playing nine games for the Jammers, for whom he batted .067 on 2-for-30 hitting, he was promoted to the Greensboro Grasshoppers of the Single-A South Atlantic League. With Greensboro, Stanton hit 39 home runs, on a .293 batting average with 97 RBI and a .993 OPS. Stanton received an invitation to the 2009 Marlins' spring training. He won numerous post-season awards for his performance in the 2008 minor league season, and was placed at number 16 on Baseball America's top 100 prospects list.

Stanton began the 2009 season with the Jupiter Hammerheads of the High-A Florida State League, where he batted .294 with 12 home runs and 39 RBIs. This performance led to a promotion to the Jacksonville Suns of the Double-A Southern League. He was selected for the All-Star Futures Game. In the off-season, he was sent to the Arizona Fall League, for top MLB prospects. Before going down with an injury, he led the league with a .478 batting average. Baseball America declared him the number one prospect in the Marlins system, as well as being number 3 on John Manuel's of Baseball America, top 20 prospects in the minors.

In 52 games with the Suns in 2010, Stanton batted .311 with 21 home runs, 52 RBIs, and a 1.167 OPS. He struck out just nine more times than he walked (44). After a series against the Mississippi Braves in early May, Mississippi manager Phil Wellman told The Florida Times Union: "He looks like a 15-year-old playing on an 8-year-old's Little League team." On May 6, 2010, Stanton hit a home run against the Montgomery Biscuits that cleared the scoreboard in center field and traveled an estimated 500 to 550 feet (150 to 170 m).

=== Florida / Miami Marlins (2010–2017) ===
==== 2010: Rookie season ====
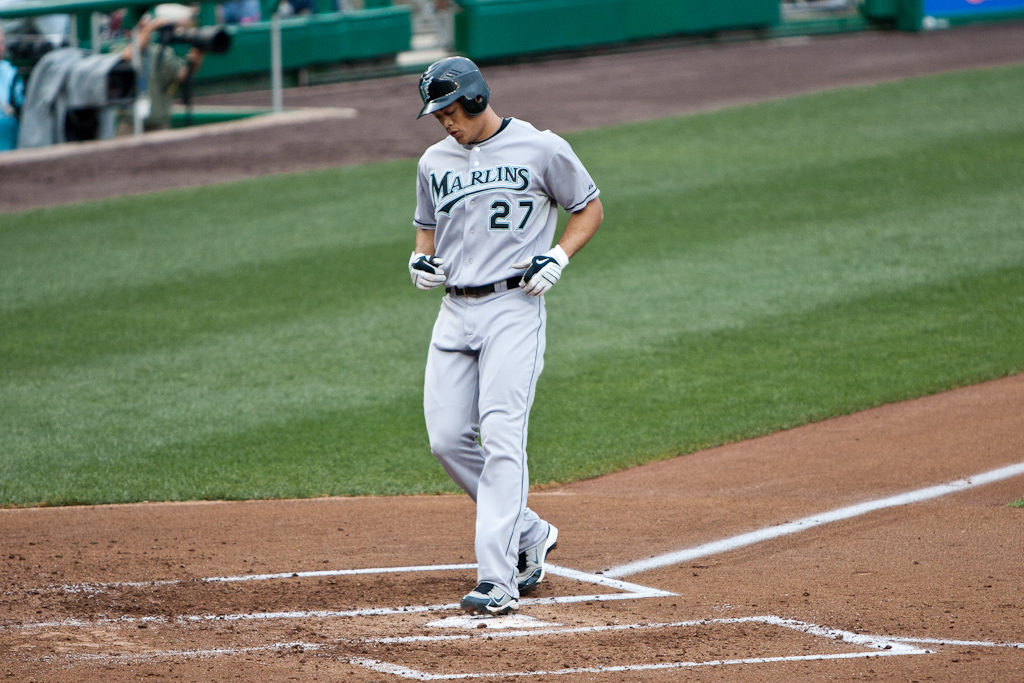
Stanton with the Marlins in 2010

On June 6, 2010, the Florida Marlins announced that Stanton would be called up to MLB, making his MLB debut on June 8. At 20 years, 212 days, he became the third youngest player in Marlins history, behind Édgar Rentería (19 years, 276 days) and Miguel Cabrera (20 years, 67 days). Stanton went 3-for-5 with two infield singles and scored twice in the debut.

Stanton's first MLB home run was a grand slam off of Tampa Bay Rays pitcher Matt Garza. He joined Jeff Conine, Chuck Carr, Quilvio Veras, Craig Counsell and Jeremy Hermida on the list of Marlins whose first homer came with the bases loaded. In addition, Stanton became the fourth player in the past 25 years to hit his first career grand slam before his 21st birthday along with Jose Reyes (2003), Andruw Jones (1997) and Alex Rodriguez (1996). On August 11, 2010, against the Washington Nationals, Stanton went 5-for-5 with four RBIs, two doubles and a home run. He became the second youngest player to collect five hits and four RBIs in a game, and the youngest to do it since 1935 (Phil Cavarretta, who was 19 years and 33 days old with the Chicago Cubs on August 21, 1935). Stanton also is just the second Marlin with five hits and four RBIs in the same game, joining Gary Sheffield, who did it on September 17, 1995, at Colorado.

Stanton's favorite MLB at-bat came on September 6, 2010, against Roy Oswalt in Philadelphia. Stanton thought he had struck out on a foul tip, but the catcher dropped the ball. On the next pitch, he hit a 435-foot home run. "That (home run) I really liked, because that's what made me grow," Stanton said. "I thought I struck out; I was a little flustered. You learn that when something's over with, you move on. I did that pretty quick right there."

For his rookie season, Stanton's home runs averaged a distance of 399.6 feet with average speed of 104.3 mph.

He was named an outfielder on Baseball America's 2010 All-Rookie Team. He was also named an outfielder on the 2010 Topps Major League Rookie All-Star Team.

==== 2011 ====
In 2011, Stanton battled through leg and eye injuries which kept him from being a consistent hitting threat in the Marlins lineup. He hit his first walk-off home run on July 6, 2011, against the Philadelphia Phillies. Stanton finished the 2011 season batting .262 with 34 home runs and 87 RBIs in 516 at-bats. According to HitTrackerOnline, Stanton belted 15 home runs, the most in the National League and second most in the major leagues behind José Bautista's 18. Stanton hit the longest home runs of the season by any player in 2011 at Citi Field (465 feet), Nationals Park (455 feet), Coors Field (475 feet), and Sun Life Stadium (466 feet). His average distance (416.6 feet) and off-bat speed (107.4 mph) made significant improvement in his sophomore season. Stanton finished 23rd in the National league MVP.

At the end of the season, Stanton had 56 career home runs before his 22nd birthday (which was in November), which matched Alex Rodriguez and was behind only Ken Griffey Jr. among players in the past 40 seasons.

==== 2012: All-Star season ====
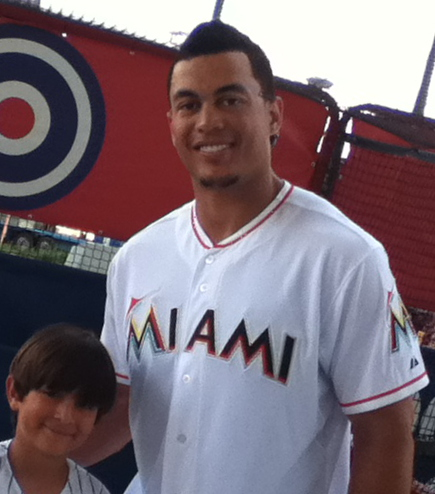
Stanton with a fan in 2012

On May 21, 2012, Stanton hit a grand slam off Jamie Moyer that traveled 462 feet (141 m) with an exit velocity of 122.4 miles per hour (197.0 km/h), the fastest since ESPN's Home Run Tracker began tracking. The ball made contact with a scoreboard in the outfield which resulted in the panels hit getting knocked out momentarily. Moyer had not given up a grand slam since 2004.

On June 28, 2012, Stanton confirmed that he would play in the 2012 MLB All-Star Game and participate in the Home Run Derby. However, On July 7, Stanton left the game against the St. Louis Cardinals after experiencing knee soreness. The next day, Stanton had surgery on his knee and later missed both of the events. He was placed on the 15-day disabled list on July 14. On August 17, Stanton hit a 494-foot home run at Coors Field. The home run was his sixth home run at Coors Field, in as many games, dating back to 2011. The home run was the longest in MLB since 2009.

Stanton finished the 2012 season with career highs in home runs (37; second in the National League, behind only Ryan Braun), batting average (.290), on-base percentage (.361), and slugging percentage (.608) which led all of MLB. He was third in the NL in on-base plus slugging percentage (.969; behind Braun and Joey Votto).

According to HitTrackerOnline, Stanton belted 11 no-doubt home runs, the most in the National League and sixth most in the major leagues. Stanton hit the longest home runs of the season at Coors Field (494 feet) for 2nd straight season, and Marlins Park (462 feet). His average distance (413 feet) and off-bat speed (107.2 mph) remained on-par with his 2011 campaign.

==== 2013: Injury season ====
After having a career-best .290 batting average, 37 home runs, and a .608 slugging percentage, Stanton had a good feeling coming into the 2013 season from spring training and participating in the WBC team USA. On April 27, 2013, Stanton opened up with his first homer of the season, putting it over the scoreboard he hit last season off Jamie Moyer, and traveling an estimated 472 feet. Stanton was put on the 15-day disabled list three days later due to a grade 2 hamstring injury. He was re-activated on June 10, 2013.

Missing six weeks, about 1/4 of the season, Stanton worked hard to regain his form. With only 116 games played he was not able to put up equivalent numbers: for 425 at-bats he had a .249 average with 106 hits, 62 RBIs, and 24 home runs by season's end. Stanton was able to hit a milestone marker in his career. In a June 17, 2013, victory, Stanton hit two long home runs, one off former closer Heath Bell to take the lead. They were his 99th and 100th career home runs, making him the 9th fastest player to hit 100 career home runs. On the last day of the regular season against the Detroit Tigers, Stanton scored the winning run on a wild pitch to complete Henderson Álvarez's no-hitter.

Stanton again displayed home run power but fell short of expectations due to his injury.

==== 2014: All-Star season; contract extension ====
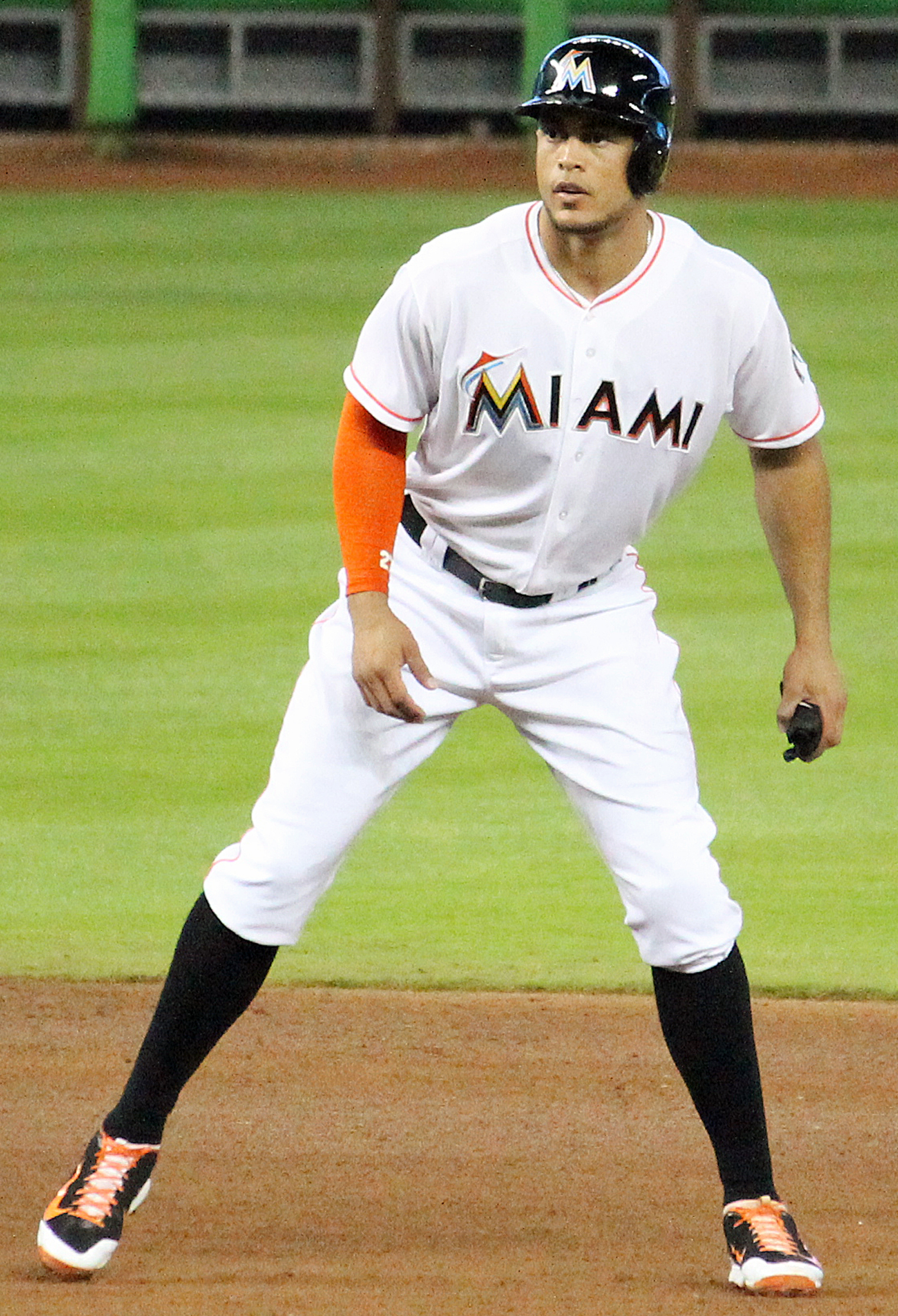
Stanton with the Marlins in 2014

On April 18, Stanton hit a walk-off grand slam home run against the Seattle Mariners. Against the San Diego Padres, Stanton hit what was estimated to be the longest home run in Marlins Park history. Stanton hit his 154th career home run with the Marlins, tying the franchise career record with Dan Uggla. On September 11, Stanton was hit by a pitch in the face by Milwaukee Brewers pitcher Mike Fiers, and was at first expected to resume play, but subsequent examination determined the injury was more serious. The impact resulted in multiple facial fractures, lacerations, and dental damage. On September 17, the Marlins announced that Stanton would shut down the rest of the 2014 season. In 145 games, Stanton batted .288 with 37 home runs, 105 RBIs, 94 walks (24 intentional), a .555 slugging percentage, and a .950 OPS. He finished second in MVP voting to winner Clayton Kershaw.

On November 17, 2014, the Marlins and Stanton agreed to a 13-year, $325 million extension, then the most lucrative contract in sports history. The deal included a no-trade clause, and Stanton would be able to opt out of the contract after he turned 30.

==== 2015: All-Star, injury-shortened season ====
On April 16, Stanton hit his 155th career home run, surpassing Dan Uggla to become the Marlins all-time home run leader. On May 12, Stanton hit a 467-foot home run which cleared the left-field stands at Dodger Stadium. It was the third-longest home run of the season at that point and the fifth ever hit out of Dodger Stadium. On May 15, 2015, Stanton hit a 474-foot line drive to center field which landed in the camera well in Marlins Park. It was the second-longest home run of the season at that time, pushing his out-of-the-stadium homer to number 4. On May 30, Stanton hit a 466-foot home run, the longest in Citi Field history. In June he had a strong batting average, but on June 26, he broke the hamate bone in his left wrist in a ninth-inning at-bat.

At the time of his season-ending hand injury in June, Stanton had played only 74 games but hit 27 home runs, with a batting average of .265. His batted balls had the highest average exit velocity of the season in the major leagues, at 96.0 miles per hour. He also hit the ball with the highest exit velocity in the major league all season, at 120.3 miles per hour.

==== 2016 ====
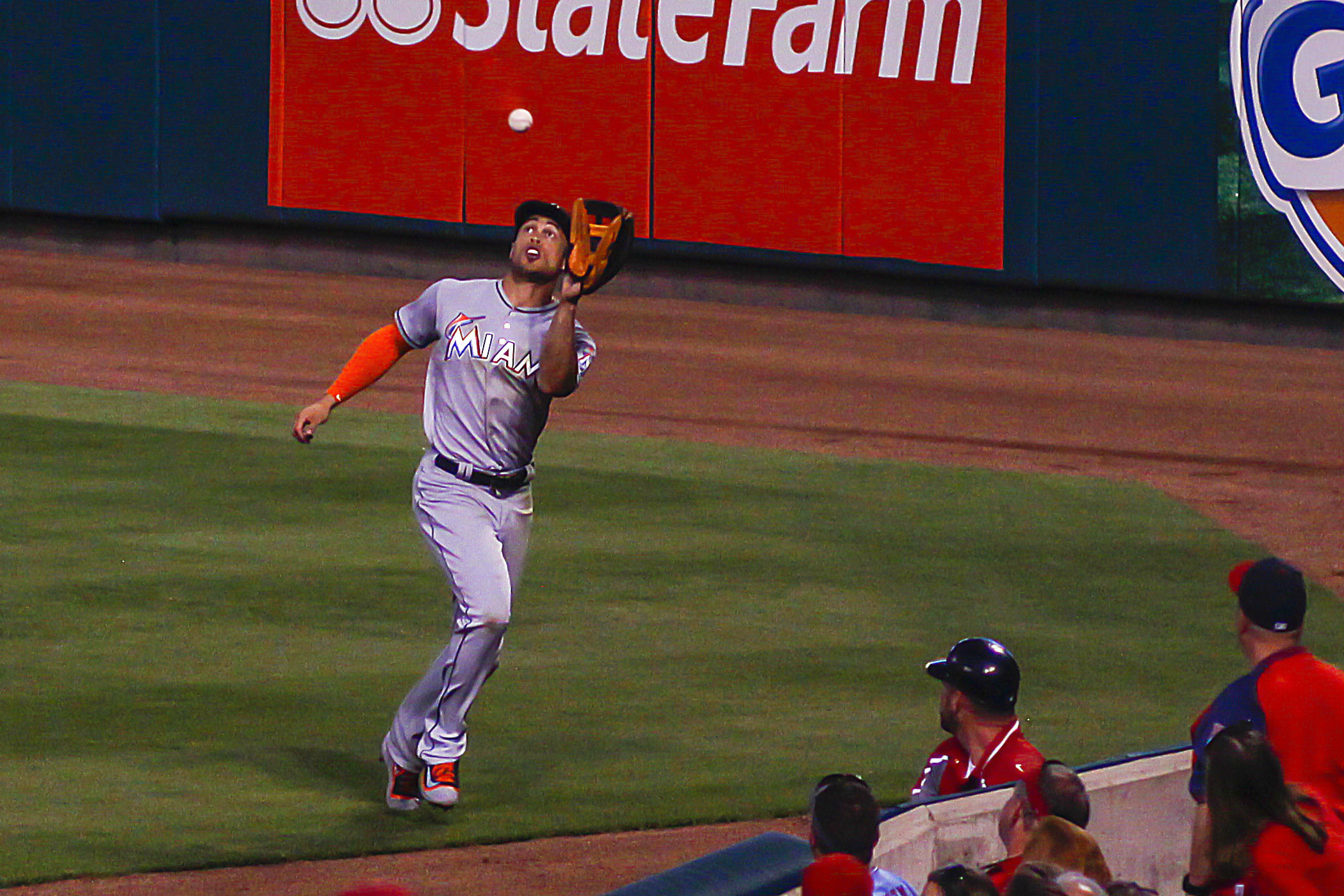
Stanton makes a catch during a game against the St. Louis Cardinals in 2016.

On April 26, Stanton hit a three-run home run off of Dodgers ace Clayton Kershaw. It was the first three-run homer Kershaw had allowed in 844 innings. From July 5–6, Stanton hit four home runs in four consecutive at-bats at Citi Field.

Despite not being selected to the 2016 Major League Baseball All-Star Game, Stanton was among those representing the National League in the 2016 version of the Home Run Derby. Stanton won the Derby with 61 total home runs, setting a new record for most home runs in a single Derby. Stanton hit the 10 longest home runs and 18 of the 19 longest among the eight competitors. In 119 games of 2016, Stanton batted .240 with 27 home runs and 74 RBIs. He again hit the ball with the highest exit velocity in the major league all season, at 120.1 miles per hour. He also hit the longest home run of the season in the major leagues, a 504-foot home run. He missed 22 games in August and September after suffering a grade 2 hamstring strain, originally thought to be season-ending.

==== 2017: MVP season ====
On April 12, 2017, Stanton hit two home runs, the second one landing in a pool behind the left-center field, prompting a fan to dive in to retrieve the ball. The Marlins would lose 5–4 to the Braves. On May 21, while at Dodger Stadium, Stanton attempted to snag a fly ball that was heading for the visiting teams' bullpen by leaping up on the door, but the door was left unlocked, causing it to slide open while Stanton was hanging on it. Stanton was selected to the National League team in the All-Star Game, his fourth selection, played at Marlins Park. At the time, he led the NL with 26 home runs and batted .277/.360/.572 (avg/on base/slugging). He also participated in the Home Run Derby but lost by one home run in the first round to New York Yankees catcher and future teammate Gary Sánchez.

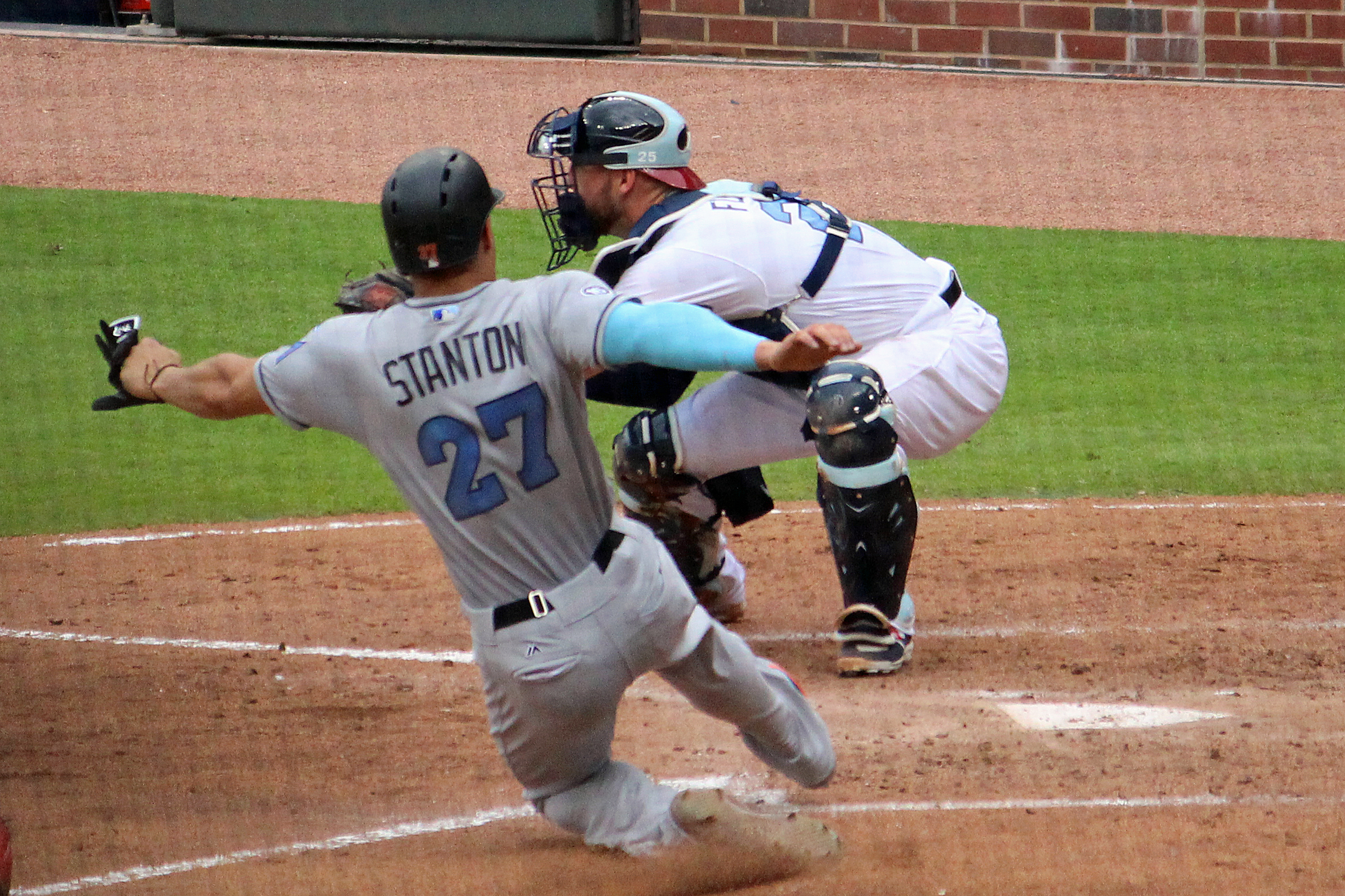
Stanton in 2017 sliding at home plate in the Father’s Day-themed MLB uniforms

Named NL Player of the Week on August 13, Stanton had hit his 250th career home run earlier in the day versus the Colorado Rockies. For the week, he generated a major league-leading six home runs and 11 RBIs and averaged 1.037 SLG and 1.416 OPS. While playing the San Francisco Giants on August 14, Stanton hit his 43rd home run, setting the Marlins franchise record for most home runs in a season, which surpassed Gary Sheffield's mark of 42 set in 1996. Stanton hit the home run versus Ty Blach and had homered in five consecutive games, setting another franchise record. Over a span of 35 games through August 15, Stanton erupted for 23 home runs, including in six games in a row. Only Sammy Sosa (1998) and Barry Bonds (2001) had hit more in a 35-game span.

On August 27, Stanton became the first player since Chris Davis in 2013 to hit 50 home runs in one season. Stanton also became the sixth player in MLB history to reach 50 home runs before the end of August. During the August 29 game versus the Washington Nationals, he hit his 18th home run of the month, tying Rudy York for the most home runs in August, set in 1937. Stanton won the NL Player of the Month Award for August, leading the major league with 18 home runs, 37 RBIs, 28 runs scored and .899 slugging percentage. Stanton hit his 57th home run and drove in four runs on September 23 versus Arizona, giving him 125 RBIs on the season, and passing Preston Wilson's franchise record of 121 set in 2000. Enhancing the cachet of Stanton's historic season, ESPN ranked Marlins Park as one of the six most difficult stadiums in which to hit a home run in 2017.

He finished the season with 59 home runs and 132 RBIs and batted .281. He yet again hit the ball with the highest exit velocity in the major league all season, at 120.1 miles per hour. He also had the highest ISO (Isolated Power) of all MLB players in 2017, at .350. He was also the first player in the National League since Prince Fielder in 2007 to hit 50 or more home runs in a season.

Before Game 2 of the World Series, Stanton was presented with the Hank Aaron Award, the second of his career, as the "most outstanding offensive performer" in the National League. On November 16, Stanton was named the National League's Most Valuable Player, beating out Cincinnati Reds' first baseman Joey Votto by two voting points. At the end of his MVP season, Stanton was the holder of 10 Marlins records including most career home runs (267), RBIs (672), slugging percentage (.554), total bases (1,983), strikeouts (1,140), and single-season records for home runs (59), RBIs (132), slugging percentage (.631), extra-base hits (91), and total bases (377).

In the offseason, the new Marlins ownership sought to trade Stanton in order to shed his large contract from the payroll; on December 8, the Marlins agreed to trade Stanton to the Cardinals, but Stanton exercised his no-trade clause to formally reject the deal. Hours later, the Marlins finalized a trade with the Giants, but Stanton again used his no-trade clause to veto the offer.

=== New York Yankees (2018–present) ===
On December 11, 2017, the New York Yankees acquired Stanton and cash considerations from the Marlins for Starlin Castro and minor leaguers Jorge Guzmán and José Devers. He is the second player in Major League history to be traded after a 50-homer season, Greg Vaughn being the first. He is also the first reigning MVP to change teams since his former hitting coach Barry Bonds did so in 1992-1993.

==== 2018 ====
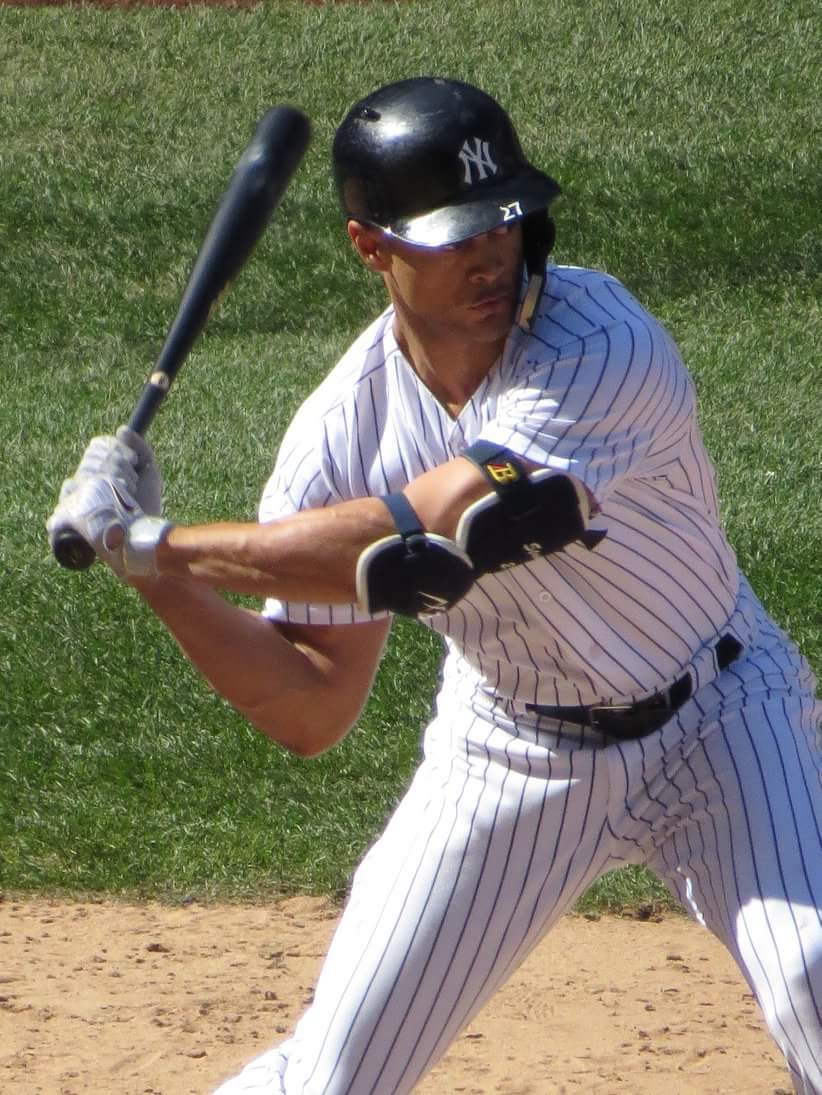
Stanton batting in April 2018, his first season with the Yankees

Stanton hit two home runs in his debut with the Yankees, including on his first at-bat, on Opening Day 2018. He was the first Yankee since Joe Pepitone to have a multi home run game on Opening Day. On May 15, Stanton collected his 1,000th hit. On June 4, while playing the Detroit Tigers, pitcher Mike Fiers, who hit Stanton in the face in 2014, hit him again, angering Stanton. In his next at-bat, he hit a home run to left field, pointing at Fiers as he crossed home plate. On August 30, Stanton hit his 300th home run, off Francisco Liriano, becoming the 147th player in MLB history to do so.

Stanton played 158 games in 2018, finishing the year with a .266 batting average, 38 home runs, 34 doubles, and 100 RBIs. He also struck out 211 times, breaking the Yankees record previously set by Aaron Judge. For the fourth consecutive year, he hit the ball with the highest exit velocity of the season in the major leagues, which was 121.7 miles per hour. He also tied for the major league lead in sacrifice flies (10).

The Yankees finished the season at 100–62, eight games behind the Boston Red Sox, clinching a wild card spot. In the 2018 AL Wild Card Game against the Oakland Athletics, Stanton hit his first career postseason home run off of Blake Treinen. The Yankees won 7–2 but were eliminated 3–1 in the ALDS by the Red Sox.

==== 2019 ====
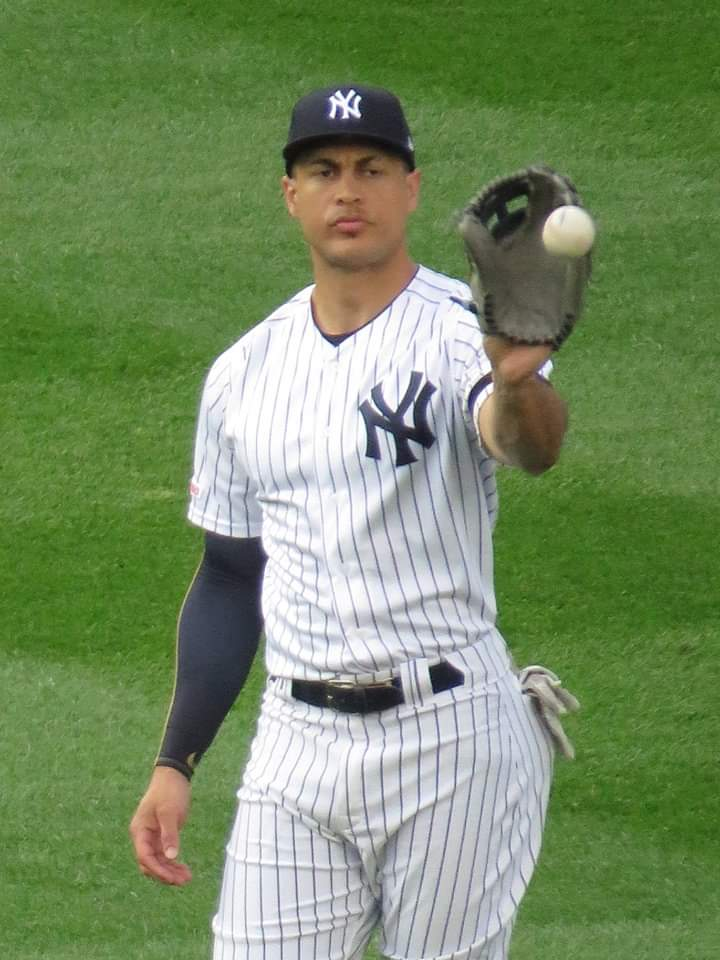
Stanton with the Yankees in 2019

On April 1, Stanton was placed on the 10-day injured list due to a Grade 1 left biceps strain. On April 22 he received a cortisone injection in his left shoulder that was administered to address a preexisting injury. On May 20, he was optioned to Class-A Advanced Tampa for a rehab assignment. He made his return on June 20 as a right fielder against Tampa Bay Rays. On June 27, he returned to IL with a knee injury, thus missing the London series against Boston Red Sox. He was replaced by fellow outfielder, Mike Tauchman. On August 11, he was transferred to the 60-day injured list. In 2019 with the Yankees, he batted .288/.403/.492 with three home runs in 59 at-bats.

==== 2020 ====
On July 23, Stanton opened the COVID-19 pandemic-delayed 2020 season with the first home run in MLB for the year, hit in the first inning of the Yankees' Opening Day game against the Washington Nationals off of Max Scherzer.

Stanton suffered a hamstring injury in August, and was limited to just 23 games. He finished the regular season hitting .250 with four home runs and 11 RBIs.

In Game 1 of the 2020 American League Division Series on October 5, Stanton hit a grand slam in the ninth inning to propel the Yankees to a 9–3 win over the Tampa Bay Rays. Stanton stayed hot throughout the series, launching two home runs in Game 2 and another in Game 3, making it five straight games with a home run dating back to the Wild Card Series — six total during that stretch. Despite his dominant run, the Yankees were eliminated by the Rays in a winner-take-all Game 5. Across seven postseason games in 2020, Stanton hit six home runs, drove in 13 runs, and put up a .308 batting average with a 1.426 OPS.

==== 2021 ====
On May 14, he was placed on the 10-day injured list with a strained left quadriceps muscle. He missed 13 games.

On July 30, he returned to the outfield after a long absence, playing left field against the Marlins. He didn't see any action in the outfield in the pandemic-shortened 2020 season, and played there only 13 games in 2019 and 73 games in 2018 as he moved into the designated-hitter role. Stanton had a bounce-back 2021 season after two years of injury-riddled seasons, batting .273/.354/.516 with 35 home runs and 97 RBIs. Stanton went 3-for-4 with a home run and two long singles that hit off the top of the Green Monster in the Yankees' 6–2 loss to the Red Sox in the American League Wild Card Game.

==== 2022: All-Star Game MVP ====
On June 17, Stanton hit his 361st home run during a game against the Toronto Blue Jays, tying Joe DiMaggio's career record as the 84th player on the all-time list. However, it took Stanton 1,800 fewer at-bats to achieve this feat. On June 25, Stanton hit a ground ball for the final out of a Houston Astros combined no-hitter, the first no-hitter pitched against the Yankees in 19 years.

On July 8, Stanton was elected to start the All-Star Game in the outfield. It was his 5th career selection, the first all-star game selection since 2017, and his first selection with the Yankees. Stanton hit a two-run home run in the 4th inning off Tony Gonsolin, which was immediately followed by Byron Buxton's go-ahead home run. Stanton was named the 2022 All-Star Game MVP.

On September 20 at Yankee Stadium, in a 9–8 win over the Pittsburgh Pirates, Stanton hit his third career walk-off grand slam.

In 2022, he batted .211/.297/.462 (all career lows) in 398 at-bats, with 31 home runs and 78 RBIs. He slumped especially in the second half of the season, batting .151/.246/.336, and against power pitchers, batting .156/.248/.313. He had the slowest sprint speed of all Yankees, at 24.5 feet per second.

On October 18, Stanton hit a three-run home run in the deciding Game 5 of the ALDS against the Cleveland Guardians, helping propel the Yankees to the ALCS.

==== 2023 ====
During a game against the Colorado Rockies on July 15, Stanton recorded his 1,000th RBI, going 1-for-3 with a three-run home run off Connor Seabold and 4 RBIs. Stanton became the second-fastest player to reach 1,000 career RBIs among those who debuted after 2009, doing so in just 1,476 games — trailing only after Nolan Arenado (1,426). He reached the milestone faster than Paul Goldschmidt (1,561), Freddie Freeman (1,655), and Andrew McCutchen (1,888).

On September 5, Stanton hit his 400th career home run (a 451-foot, two-run blast) during a game against the Detroit Tigers off pitcher José Cisnero. He became the 58th MLB player to hit his 400th career home run and the fourth quickest player (1,520 games) behind Mark McGwire (1,412), Babe Ruth (1,475), and Alex Rodriguez (1,489), and surpassing Albert Pujols (1,523 games). He also became the tenth Yankees player in team history to accomplish the feat, receiving a standing ovation from the Yankees crowd.

Stanton had a career-worst season in 2023. His batting average (.191), On-base Percentage (.275), Slugging Percentage (.420), and OPS (.695) were all career lows.

==== 2024: ALCS MVP ====
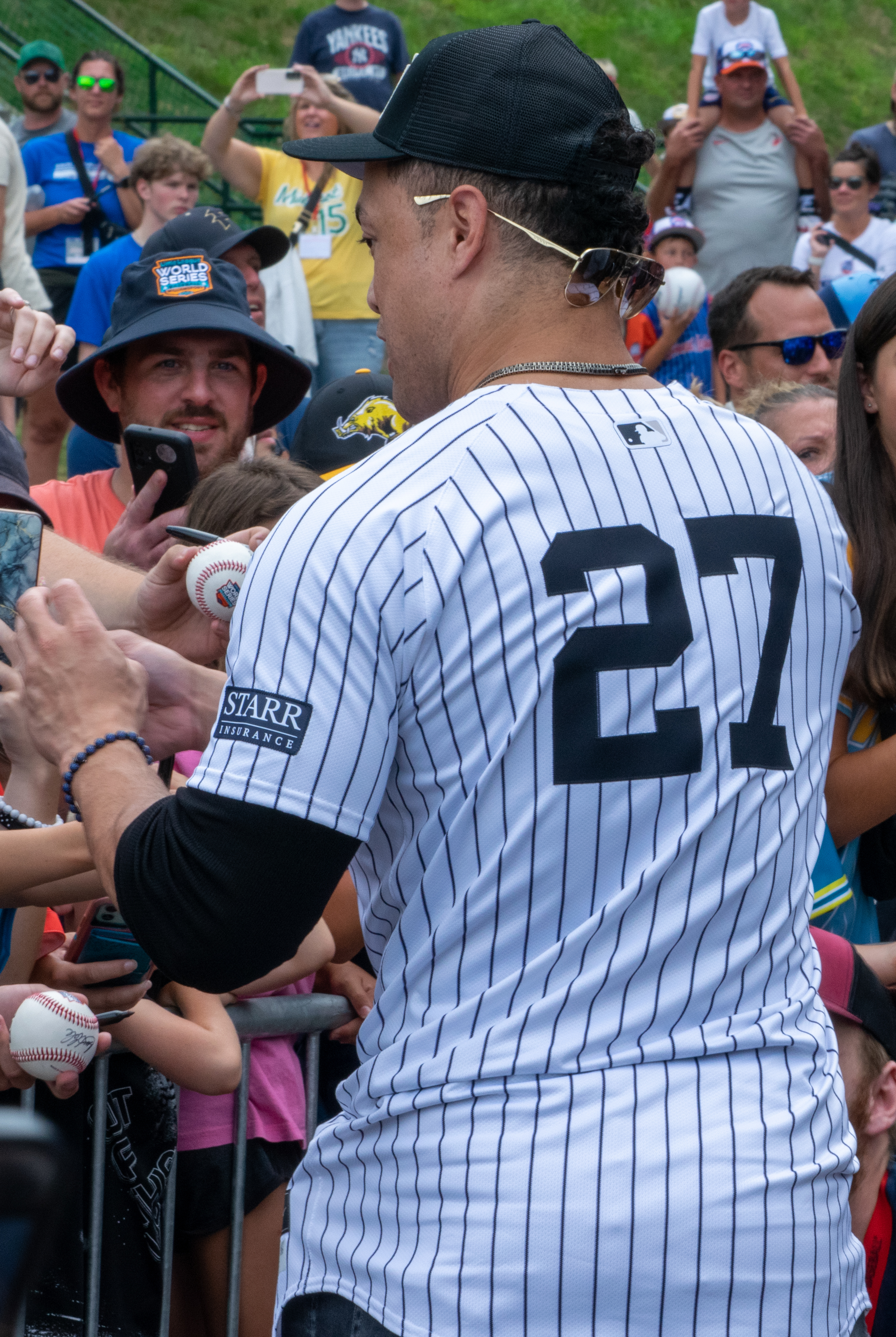
Stanton with the Yankees in 2024

Prior to the 2024 season, Stanton made adjustments to his hitting mechanics and improved his athletic capacities. He also started using a torpedo bat and led the majors with an average bat velocity of 81.2 mph. On June 4, 2024, Stanton hit his 150th Yankee home run off Caleb Thielbar of the Minnesota Twins. Stanton injured his left hamstring against the Atlanta Braves and was placed on the injured list on June 23. He was activated from the IL and made his return for the Yankees against the Philadelphia Phillies on July 29.

Stanton had a bit of a bounce-back season in 2024, batting .233/ .298/.476, with an OPS of .774, while also hitting 27 home runs and 72 RBIs.

In the ALCS against the Cleveland Guardians, Stanton hit four home runs and had an OPS of 1.222 in five games, winning the LCS MVP Award as the Yankees advanced to the 2024 World Series. Stanton slugged two home runs in the World Series in a losing effort, falling to the Los Angeles Dodgers in five games. Stanton's seven home runs in the 2024 Postseason are tied for the third most of all time in a single postseason. Stanton also became the second player (the other being Steve Garvey) in Major League history to win an All-Star Game MVP (2022), a League MVP (2017, NL), and a Championship Series MVP in a career. Stanton's 18 career postseason home runs with the Yankees are tied with Mickey Mantle for the third-most in franchise history, and combined with his impressive stats and clutch moments, have solidified his place in the eyes of many as one of the best playoff performers in Yankees history.

In 2024, Stanton became the last active player on an MLB roster who had played for the Florida Marlins.

==== 2025 ====
Stanton began the 2025 season on the injured list due to "severe" injuries in both of his elbows, later specified as epicondylitis. He was transferred to the 60-day injured list on May 1, 2025. On June 16, Stanton was activated to make his season debut. On September 20, Stanton hit his 450th career home run against the Baltimore Orioles when he hit a three-run homer in the first inning. He became the 42nd player to reach 450 home runs in his career. In 77 games, Stanton hit .273/.350/.594 while slugging 24 home runs and 66 RBI.

==== 2026 ====
In late April, Stanton went on the injured list due to a right calf strain. He aggravated his right calf two months later, extending his stay on the injured list. On August 22, Stanton strained his left calf running the bases during a rehab stint, putting his return for 2026 in jeopardy. He was then transferred to the 60-day injured list on August 25.

== International career ==
Stanton has represented the United States internationally, including the World Baseball Classic in 2013 and 2017. Team Puerto Rico had previously investigated whether Stanton could play for them or not. However, it was discovered that his connection with Puerto Rico was too far back on his mother's family tree for him to be eligible to represent the island.

In an elimination game against the Dominican Republic at the 2017 World Baseball Classic, Stanton launched a go-ahead two-run home run off of Ervin Santana in the fourth inning, helping secure a crucial win for Team USA. The ball clocked in at 117.3 mph, traveled 424 feet, and hit off of the Western Metal Supply Co. building at Petco Park. Team USA would go on to win in the championship game against Puerto Rico and earn their first World Baseball Classic title.

== Awards and honors ==
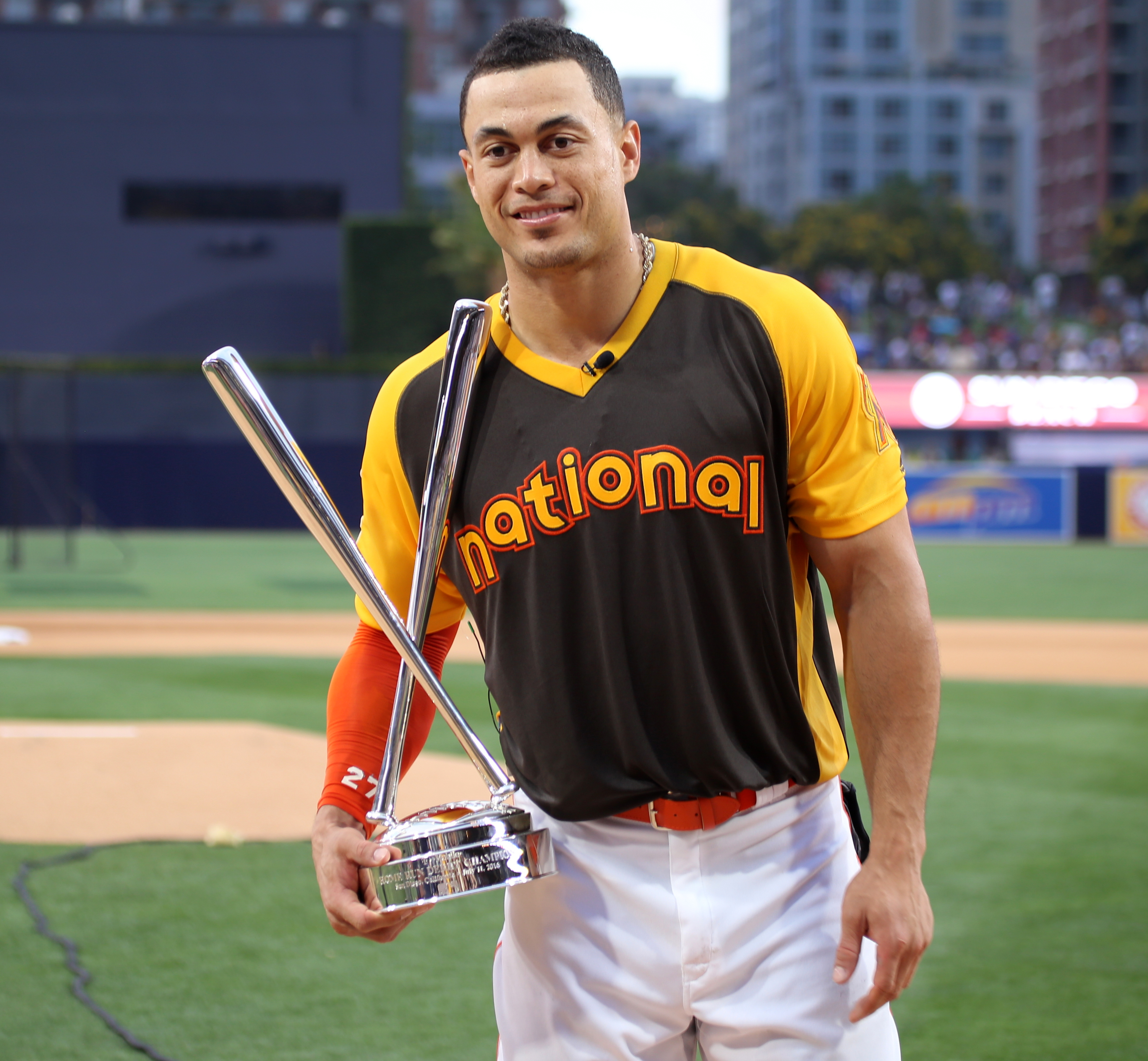
Stanton posing with the 2016 Home Run Derby trophy

MLB

- 5× All-Star (2012, 2014, 2015, 2017, 2022)
- NL MVP (2017)
- ALCS MVP (2024)
- All-Star Game MVP (2022)
- Home Run Derby champion (2016)
- 2× Silver Slugger Award (2014, 2017)
- 2× NL Hank Aaron Award (2014, 2017)
- 2× NL home run leader (2014, 2017)
- NL RBI leader (2017)
- Wilson Defensive Player of the Year Award (2012)
- 50 Home Run Club (2017)
- 8× National League Player of the Week (August 15–21, 2010, August 26 – September 1, 2012, June 14–20, 2015, July 10–16, 2016, August 13–19, 2017, August 27 – September 2, 2017, September 24–30, 2017)
- American League Player of the Week (September 26 – October 2, 2021)
- 3× National League Player of the Month (May 2012, June 2015, August 2017)

International

- World Baseball Classic champion (2017)

== Personal life ==
Stanton's mother calls him "Cruz" (his other middle name), but his father and other relatives call him "Mike" or "Mikey". As a child, he was known as Giancarlo but switched to Mike in sixth grade because he was tired of being mocked for his original name and having it mispronounced. He was known as "Mike Stanton" throughout his high school and minor league careers and for his first two years as a major leaguer. After a trip to Europe in the 2011–12 offseason (during which he frequently heard names like Gianpiero, Gianpaolo, and Gianluigi) he made it known before the 2012 season that he preferred to be called Giancarlo.

When asked by the New York Post in May 2021 how he liked "being one of New York’s most eligible bachelors", he said, "It’s nice, and it also allows me to focus on being the best baseball player I can be."

== See also ==
- 50 home run club
- List of largest sports contracts
- List of Major League Baseball annual home run leaders
- List of Major League Baseball annual runs batted in leaders
- List of Major League Baseball career OPS leaders
- List of Major League Baseball career putouts as a right fielder leaders
- List of Major League Baseball career slugging percentage leaders
- List of Major League Baseball career home run leaders
- List of Major League Baseball career runs batted in leaders
- List of Major League Baseball ultimate grand slams
- List of Miami Marlins team records
- Major League Baseball Most Valuable Player Award
- Miami Marlins award winners and league leaders
- New York Yankees award winners and league leaders

Awards
Preceded by Matt Kemp	National League Player of the Month; May 2012	Succeeded by Andrew McCutchen
Achievements
Previous: Alex Rodriguez	Largest sports contract signatory November 17, 2014 – March 20, 2019	Next: Mike Trout
