= Miami Marlins award winners and league leaders =

The Miami Marlins are a professional baseball team that has played in the National League since the team's founding in 1993. Major League Baseball offers several awards at the end of each season to commemorate the achievement of individual players. The Most Valuable Player award is generally given to the player who had the greatest impact on the success of his team, whether that be in the regular season, the postseason, or the All-Star game. The Cy Young Award is a prize awarded to the pitcher who is perceived to have had the best regular season. The Gold Glove Awards are presented to players who are recognized as being the best at fielding their respective positions during the regular season, while their counterparts the Silver Slugger is awarded to the best hitter at each respective position. The Rookie of the year is presented to the player recognized as the best newcomer to the league, while the Manager of the Year is given to the coach perceived to have had the greatest impact on his team's success.

== Awards ==
=== Most Valuable Player (NL) ===
- Giancarlo Stanton (2017)

=== Cy Young Award (NL) ===
- Sandy Alcántara (2022)

=== Rookie of the Year ===
- Dontrelle Willis (2003)
- Hanley Ramírez (2006)
- Chris Coghlan (2009)
- José Fernández (2013)

=== Manager of the Year ===
See footnote

- Jack McKeon (2003)
- Joe Girardi (2006)
- Don Mattingly (2020)
- Skip Schumaker (2023)

=== Gold Glove ===
- Charles Johnson, C (1995, 1996, 1997)
- Luis Castillo, 2B (2003, 2004, 2005)
- Derrek Lee, 1B (2003)
- Mike Lowell, 3B (2005)
- Mark Buehrle, P (2012)
- Christian Yelich, LF (2014)
- Dee Gordon, 2B (2015)
- Marcell Ozuna, LF (2017)
- Javier Sanoja, UT (2025)

=== Silver Slugger ===
- Gary Sheffield, OF (1996)
- Mike Lowell, 3B (2003)
- Miguel Cabrera, OF/3B (2005, 2006)
- Hanley Ramírez, SS (2008, 2009)
- Dan Uggla, 2B (2010)
- Giancarlo Stanton, OF (2014, 2017)
- Dee Gordon, 2B (2015)
- Christian Yelich, OF (2016)
- Marcell Ozuna, OF (2017)
- J. T. Realmuto, C (2018)
- Luis Arráez, 2B (2023)

=== Wilson Defensive Player of the Year Award ===
See explanatory note at Atlanta Braves award winners and league leaders
Team (at all positions)

- Giancarlo Stanton, (2012)
- Donovan Solano, (2013)

Second base (in MLB)

- Dee Gordon, (2015)

=== Hank Aaron Award ===
- Giancarlo Stanton, RF (2014, 2017)

=== MLB Comeback Player of the Year (NL) ===
- Casey McGehee, 3B (2014)
- Jose Fernandez, P (2016)

=== Relief Man of the Year ===
See footnote

- Antonio Alfonseca (2000)

=== World Series MVP ===
- Liván Hernández (1997)
- Josh Beckett (2003)

=== NLCS MVP ===
See: National League Championship Series

- Liván Hernández (1997)
- Iván Rodríguez (2003)

=== All-Star Game MVP ===
- Jeff Conine (1995)

=== DHL Hometown Heroes (2006) ===
- Dontrelle Willis — voted by MLB fans as the most outstanding player in the history of the franchise, based on on-field performance, leadership quality and character value

=== Baseball America Manager of the Year ===
See: Baseball America#Baseball America Manager of the Year

- Jack McKeon (2003)
- Joe Girardi (2006)

== Team award ==
- 1997 – Warren C. Giles Trophy (National League champion)
- 1997 – Commissioner's Trophy (World Series)
- 2003 – Warren C. Giles Trophy (National League champion)
- 2003 – Commissioner's Trophy (World Series)
- 2003 – Baseball America Organization of the Year

== Other achievements ==
=== National Baseball Hall of Fame ===
See: Miami Marlins#Baseball Hall of Famers

=== Retired numbers ===
See: Miami Marlins#Retired numbers

=== United States Sports Academy "Carl Maddox Sport Management Award" ===
- 1993 – Wayne Huizenga

== National League leaders ==
=== Hitting ===
==== Batting champions ====
- 2009 – Hanley Ramírez (.342)
- 2015 – Dee Strange-Gordon (.333)
- 2023 – Luis Arráez (.354)
- 2024 – Luis Arráez (.314)

==== Triples ====
- 2004 – Juan Pierre (12)

==== Home runs ====
- 2014 – Giancarlo Stanton (37)
- 2017 – Giancarlo Stanton (59)

==== Runs batted in ====
- 2017 – Giancarlo Stanton (132)

==== Runs scored ====
- 2008 – Hanley Ramírez (125)

==== Stolen bases ====
- 1993 – Chuck Carr (58)
- 1995 – Quilvio Veras (56)
- 2000 – Luis Castillo (62)
- 2002 – Luis Castillo (48)
- 2003 – Juan Pierre (65)
- 2015 – Dee Strange-Gordon (58)
- 2017 – Dee Strange-Gordon (60)
- 2022 – Jon Berti (41)

=== Pitching ===
==== Wins ====
- 2005 – Dontrelle Willis (22)

==== Saves ====
- 2000 – Antonio Alfonseca (45)
- 2004 – Armando Benítez (47)

==== Earned run average ====
- 1996 – Kevin Brown (1.89)
- 2010 – Josh Johnson (2.30)

== See also ==
- Baseball awards
- List of Major League Baseball awards

== Footnotes ==
Achievements
Preceded by New York Yankees	World Series Champions; 1997	Succeeded by New York Yankees
Preceded by Anaheim Angels	World Series Champions; 2003	Succeeded by Boston Red Sox
Preceded by Atlanta Braves	National League Champions; 1997	Succeeded by San Diego Padres
Preceded by San Francisco Giants	National League Champions; 2003	Succeeded by St. Louis Cardinals
Preceded by San Francisco Giants	National League Wild Card Winners; 2003	Succeeded by Houston Astros
Preceded by Los Angeles Dodgers	National League Wild Card Winners; 1997	Succeeded by Chicago Cubs
