= Home Run Derby =

Major League Baseball annual home run hitting contest

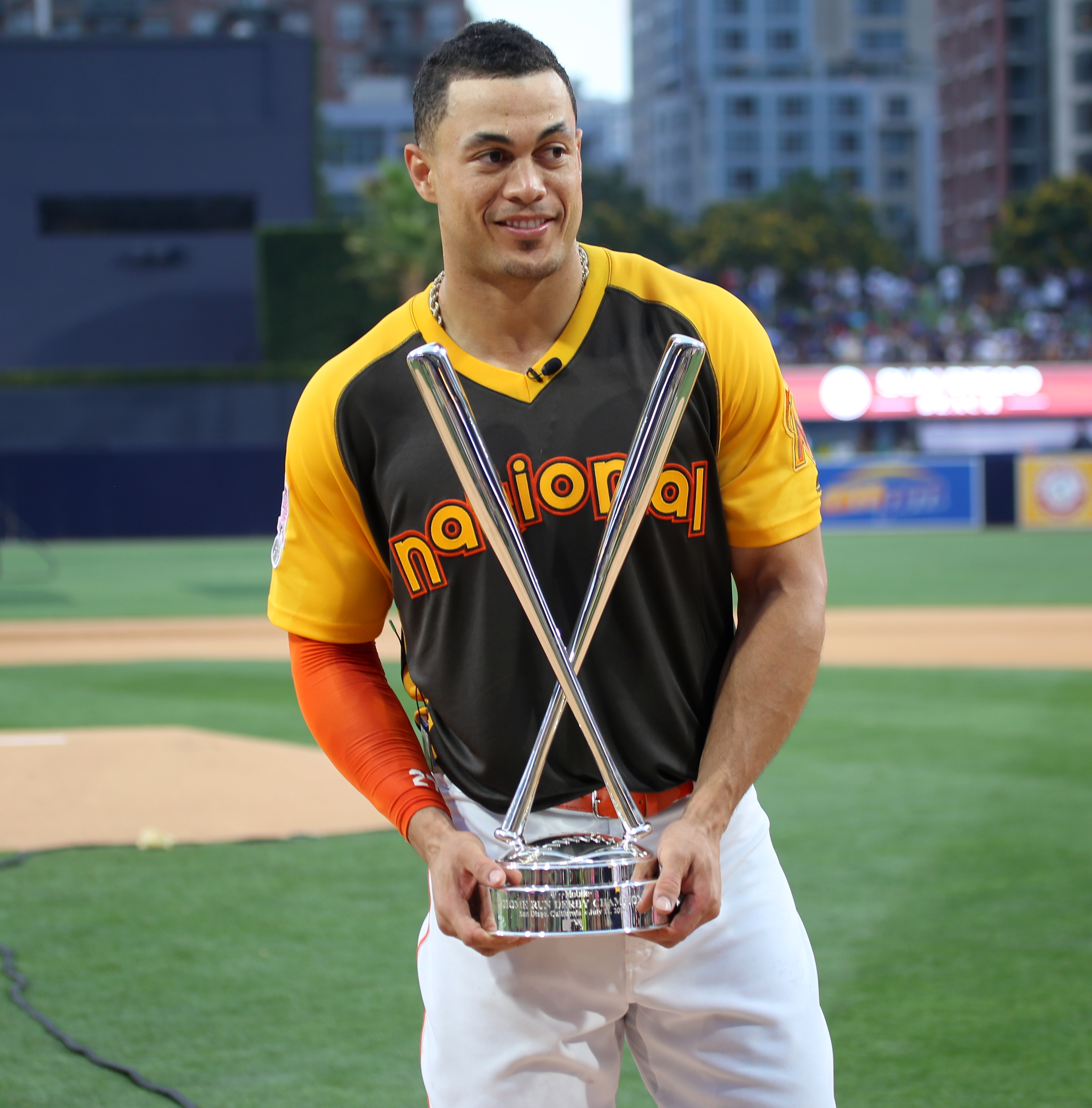
- Giancarlo Stanton poses with the trophy for winning the 2016 Home Run Derby.
- Frequency: Annual
- Location: Varies (site of MLB All-Star Game)
- Inaugurated: 1985
- Most recent: July 13, 2026 (Citizens Bank Park, Philadelphia, Pennsylvania)
- Next event: July 14, 2027 (Wrigley Field, Chicago, Illinois)
- Current champion: Jordan Walker
- Current runner-up: Kyle Schwarber
- Participants: American League and National League baseball players
- Organized by: Major League Baseball

The Home Run Derby, officially known as the T-Mobile Home Run Derby, is an annual home run hitting competition in Major League Baseball (MLB) customarily held the day before the MLB All-Star Game, which places the contest on a Monday in July. In the context of the competition a "home run" consists of hitting a baseball in fair territory out of the playing field on the fly. It differs from a home run hit during legal gameplay in that the batter is not competing against a pitcher and a defensive team attempting to make an out. In the Home Run Derby, all pitches are purposefully thrown slowly and at a closer range than the official 60 feet 6 inches (18.44 m) distance, usually by a coach behind a pitching screen. In addition, like batting practice, the batter remains in the batter's box after each swing and does not run, nor circle the bases to score a run. In 2023, Julio Rodríguez set the single-round home run record with 41 homers, topping Vladimir Guerrero Jr.'s 40 home runs in 2019.

The batter also does not have to conform to the usual league uniform standards, and as all pitches are tossed in the strike zone without any threat of beanballs, may choose to wear a regular baseball cap instead of a batting helmet. As the event traditionally takes place at sunset where the sun is of no factor to the batter, they can choose to wear their hat casually and backwards.

Since the inaugural derby in 1985, the event has seen several rule changes, evolving from a short-outs-based competition to multiple rounds, and eventually a bracket-style timed event.

T-Mobile has been the title sponsor of the Home Run Derby since 2016.

== History ==
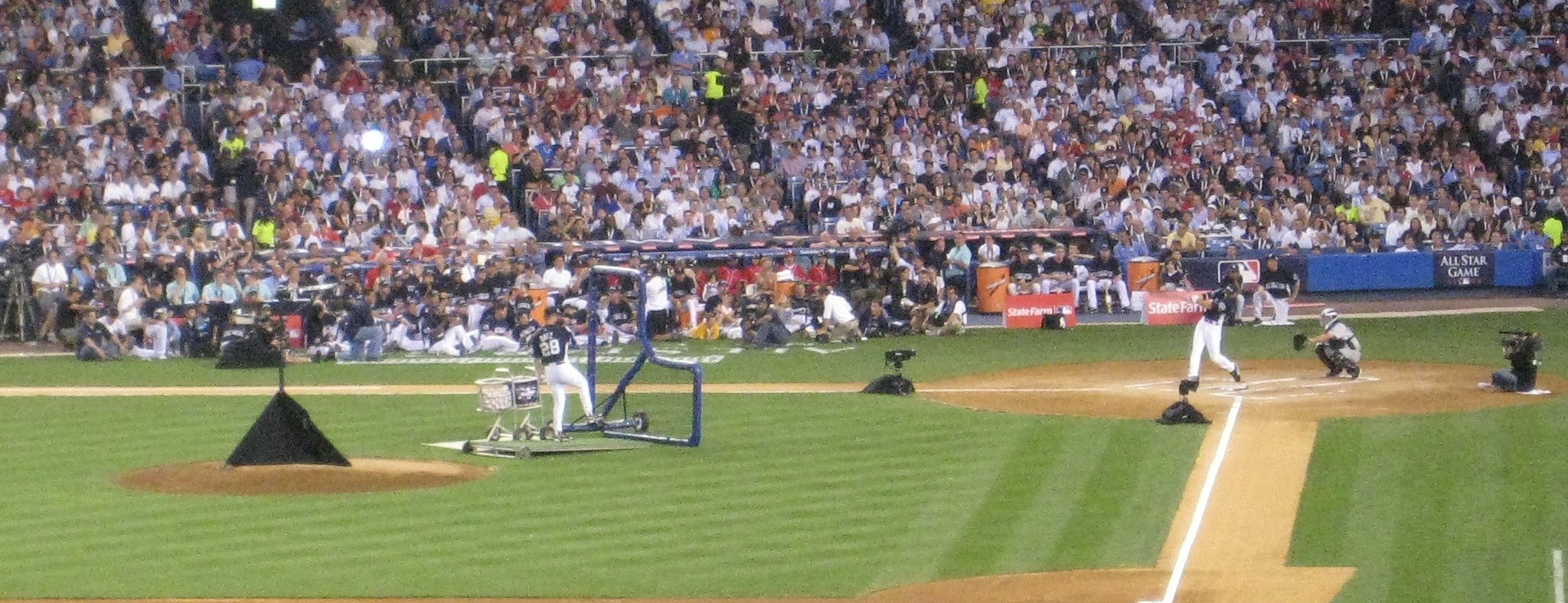
Josh Hamilton participating in the 2008 Derby, where he would ultimately finish second.

The inspiration for the event was a 1960 TV series called Home Run Derby. The televised event included baseball legends Hank Aaron, Mickey Mantle, and Willie Mays. The show ran for 26 episodes with the winner receiving $2,000.

The event has grown significantly from its roots in the 1980s, when it was not televised. Prior to 1991, the Home Run Derby was structured as a two-inning event with each player receiving five outs per inning, allowing for the possibility of ties. It is now one of the most-watched events broadcast on ESPN.

In 2000, a "match play"-style format was instituted for the second round. The player with the most home runs in the first round faced the player with the least among the four qualifying players, as did the players with the second- and third-most totals. The contestant who won each matchup advanced to the finals. This format was discontinued after the 2003 competition.

The field of players selected currently consists of four American League players and four National League players. The first Derby in 1985 featured five from each league, and the 1986 and 1987 events featured three and two players from each league, respectively. In 1996, the field was again expanded to ten players, with five from each league (though in 1997, the AL had six contestants to the NL's four).

In 2000, the field reverted to the current four-player-per-league format. The only exception was in 2005, when Major League Baseball changed the selection criteria so that eight players represented their home countries instead of their respective leagues. The change was believed to be in promotion of the inaugural World Baseball Classic, played in March 2006. In 2006, the selection of four players from each league resumed. In 2011, the format was revised so that team captains selected the individual sides.

For the first time in Derby history, Shohei Ohtani became both the first pitcher and the first Japanese player to participate in 2021.

Some notable performances in the Derby include Bobby Abreu in 2005, who won the Derby with a then-record 41 homers, including a then-record 24 in the first round. In 2008, Josh Hamilton broke the record for most home runs in a single round, with 28. This included 13 consecutive home runs and 7 that traveled over 500 feet. Vladimir Guerrero Jr. broke the first-round record in 2019 with 29 home runs. He broke that record in the following round, hitting 40 home runs in 2 tiebreakers. The previous overall record was set in 2016 by Giancarlo Stanton, who finished with a total of 61 home runs, defeating Todd Frazier in the final round. The current overall record is held by Guerrero Jr. at a mark of 91, set in 2019. Only three participants, Yoenis Céspedes, Stanton, and Pete Alonso, have won the Home Run Derby without being selected to the All-Star Game. Alonso broke Guerrero's first-round record in 2021 with 35 homers on his way to his second straight Derby Title (the first being in 2019 with a final round win over Guerrero).

With his win in 2023, Guerrero Jr. joined his father Vladimir Guerrero (the 2007 winner) to become the first father-son duo to win the Derby.

== Overview ==
=== Format ===
Eight players duel in a home run challenge.

==== 1985–1990 ====
In the early years of the Home Run Derby, 4–10 players from both the AL and NL were selected to participate. Each player was given two "innings" to hit as many home runs as possible before reaching five outs. For the derby, an out is defined as any swing that is not a home run. The winner of the contest was the player with the most total home runs in the two innings.

==== 1991–2005 ====
Beginning in 1991, the format changed to a 3-round contest. From 1991 to 2006, 8–10 players were selected and hit as many home runs as possible before reaching 10 outs in each round. The tally reset for each round, with the top four advancing to the second round, and the top two advancing to the final.

In honor of the World Baseball Classic, the 2005 contest featured eight players from different countries. The format remained the same.

==== 2006–2013 ====
The format changed slightly in 2006. Instead of the tally resetting for each round, it was only reset before the final round. Therefore, the players with the four highest totals after Round 1 advanced to Round 2, and the players with the two highest sums of Round 1 and 2 advanced to the finals.

==== 2014 ====
The Home Run Derby format was changed significantly in 2014, as MLB sought to speed up the contest and increase the drama. In the new bracket format, five players from each league faced the other players in their league in Round 1, with each players having seven "outs". The player in each league with the highest Round 1 total received a second-round bye, and the players with the second- and third-highest Round 1 totals from each league faced off. The Round 2 winner from each league faced the Round 1 winner, and the Round 3 winner crowned the league winner. The final featured the winner of each league. Each round stands alone, with the score reset for each round. Ties in any round are broken by a 3-swing swing-off. If the players remain tied, the players engage in a sudden-death swing-off until one player homers.

==== 2015–2019, 2021–2023 ====
The format was changed once again in 2015. The most significant change was the elimination of "outs", which was replaced by a time limit. Eight players are seeded based on their season home run totals and are given five minutes to hit as many home runs as possible. The winner of each head-to-head matchup advances, until a final winner is determined. If a tie occurs in any match-up, two sets of tiebreakers are employed: first, a 1-minute swing-off decides the winner; thereafter, multiple swingoffs of 3 swings until a winner is determined. Further, a player can get "bonus time" in the last minute of each round. During that time, the clock would stop for each home run, and would not restart until a swing does not result in a home run. Additional bonus time could be earned for distance. Players who hit at least two home runs measuring at least 420 feet (128.0 m) are given an extra minute of bonus time. An additional 30 seconds of bonus time is granted if at least one home run measures over 475 feet (144.8 m).

Weather concerns in 2015 led to a reduction in time from five minutes per round to four minutes. The clock was not stopped in the final minute, and one minute of bonus time was granted only for hitting two home runs of at least 425 feet (129.5 m).

The four-minute round length was made permanent in 2016, while the minute of bonus time was reduced to 30 seconds and required two home runs of at least 440 feet (134.1 m). The additional time was removed. Each batter is allowed one time-out during each round, and two in the finals.

For 2017 and 2018, the first tie-breaker was increased from a 1-minute swing off to 1 1/2 minutes. However, it was not needed in either of these years. The swing-off reverted to one minute in 2019, the first year in which it was used.

In 2021, the time limit was changed to three minutes plus a bonus of thirty seconds, with an additional thirty seconds of bonus time (for a total of one minute) added if a player hit a home run over 475 feet during regulation. In case of a tie, the contestants get one additional minute. If there still is a tie, each contestant gets three swings and repeats on ties thereafter. In the final round, the finalists get two minutes.

In 2022, the additional bonus time requirements reverted back to two home runs of at least 440 feet. Separate from the regular home run derby, if the 2022 All-Star Game itself had been tied after nine innings, a second home run derby would have been held to determine the winner. This derby would have been under somewhat different rules. It would not be timed, and each manager would pick three players to make three swings each to hit as many home runs as possible. If the tie persisted, extra players would have had triple-swing rounds until one team outslugged the other, with the winner getting a run and hit credited. A similar format would have been used in 2023 if the All-Star Game was tied after nine innings.

==== 2024–2025 ====
The format was revised prior to the 2024 event. The first round has reverted back to an open round, where the top four competitors advance. They now have three minutes, or 40 pitches, to hit as many home runs as possible. During this run, the hitters are entitled to one 30-second timeout. After their initial run ends, the hitters go into a new, un-timed "bonus period", where they attempt to hit as many home runs as possible before making three outs (any swing that is not a home run). During this period, if a competitor hits a home run that travels over 425 feet (129.5 m), they earn an additional out to work with. Ties are broken by the distance of the longest home run; otherwise, if both players tie, a one-minute playoff, and if needed, multiple three-swing rounds to decide it.

The second round is a bracket-style round, where the competitors are seeded based on their performance in the previous round. The winners of their respective head-to-head matchup advance to the finals. The rules for the round remain the same, with the tiebreaker rules from the previous format remaining as well.

The final round remains largely the same, except for the time limit reducing to two minutes and the pitch limit reducing to 27 pitches. Whoever hits the most home runs in the round is declared champion; otherwise, players go into a one-minute playoff, and if needed, multiple three-swing rounds to decide it.

==== 2026–present ====
In 2026, the format was changed to do away with the time-based system. Now, hitters receive 20 "swings" in the first round, and 15 in the semifinal and final rounds. If a player is down to their last swing and hits a home run, they may continue hitting until they fail to hit a home run.

=== Gold balls ===
From 2005 to 2013, a gold ball was used once a player reached nine outs (in 2014 when the T-Mobile Ball came into play, six; since 2015, during the final minute). If a batter hit a home run using the golden ball, Century 21 Real Estate and Major League Baseball would donate $21,000 (a reference to the "21" in "Century 21") per home run to charity (MLB donated to the Boys & Girls Clubs of America, and Century 21 donated to Easterseals). In both 2005 and 2006, $294,000 was raised for the charities, equaling 14 golden ball home runs per year. State Farm continued this in 2007 as they designated $17,000 per home run (one dollar for each of State Farm's agencies), to the Boys & Girls Clubs of America. In the 2007 event, 15 golden balls were hit for a donation of $255,000, and 10 ($170,000) were hit in the 2008 event. For 2009, State Farm added $5,000 for all non-Gold Ball homers, and $517,000 was collected. For 2010, the non-Gold Ball homer was reduced to $3,000 per home run and a total of $453,000 was collected. Since 2014 any homer hit off a magenta T-Mobile Ball resulted in a $10,000 donation to charity by T-Mobile and MLB, to Team Rubicon.

== Television coverage ==
=== TBS ===
On July 11, 1988, the day before the Major League Baseball All-Star Game from Cincinnati, TBS televised the annual All-Star Gala from the Cincinnati Zoo. Larry King hosted the broadcast with Craig Sager and Pete Van Wieren handling interviews. The broadcast's big draw would have been the Home Run Derby, which TBS intended on taping during the afternoon, and later airing it in prime time during the Gala coverage. Unfortunately, the derby and a skills competition were canceled due to rain.

=== ESPN ===
The derby was first officially nationally televised by ESPN in 1993 on a same-day delayed basis, with the first live telecast in 1998. Although two hours are scheduled in programming listings for the telecast, it has rarely ever been contained to the timeslot and consistently runs three to four hours. Chris Berman gained notoriety for his annual hosting duties on ESPN, including his catchphrase, "Back back back...Gone!".

Because of the game's TV popularity, invited players have felt pressure to participate. Notably, Ken Griffey Jr. initially quietly declined to take part in 1998, partly due to ESPN scheduling the Mariners in their late Sunday game the night before. After a discussion with ESPN's Joe Morgan and another with Hall of Famer Frank Robinson, Griffey changed his mind, and then won the Derby at Coors Field.

In Spanish, the event was televised on Spanish language network ESPN Deportes. An alternate broadcast featuring live Statcast analytics has been carried on ESPN2 since the 2019 edition.

ESPN Radio continues to carry the event annually, but the final Derby to air on ESPN in 2025.

=== Netflix ===
The Home Run Derby moved to Netflix beginning in 2026. The inaugural edition in 2026 drew 5.3 million viewers, the lowest since 2003. The audience on Netflix was also younger compared to previous editions.

=== Most watched Home Run Derbies ===
Rank	Year	Winner	Ballpark	Viewers (millions)
1	2008	Justin Morneau	Yankee Stadium	9.1
2	2017	Aaron Judge	Marlins Park	8.6
3	2009	Prince Fielder	Busch Stadium	8.3
4	2004	Miguel Tejada	Minute Maid Park	7.7
5	2002	Jason Giambi	Miller Park	7.7
6	2021	Pete Alonso	Coors Field	7.1
7	2015	Todd Frazier	Great American Ball Park	7.1
8	2012	Prince Fielder	Kauffman Stadium	6.9
9	2007	Vladimir Guerrero Sr.	AT&T Park	6.8
10	2006	Ryan Howard	PNC Park	6.8

== Winners ==
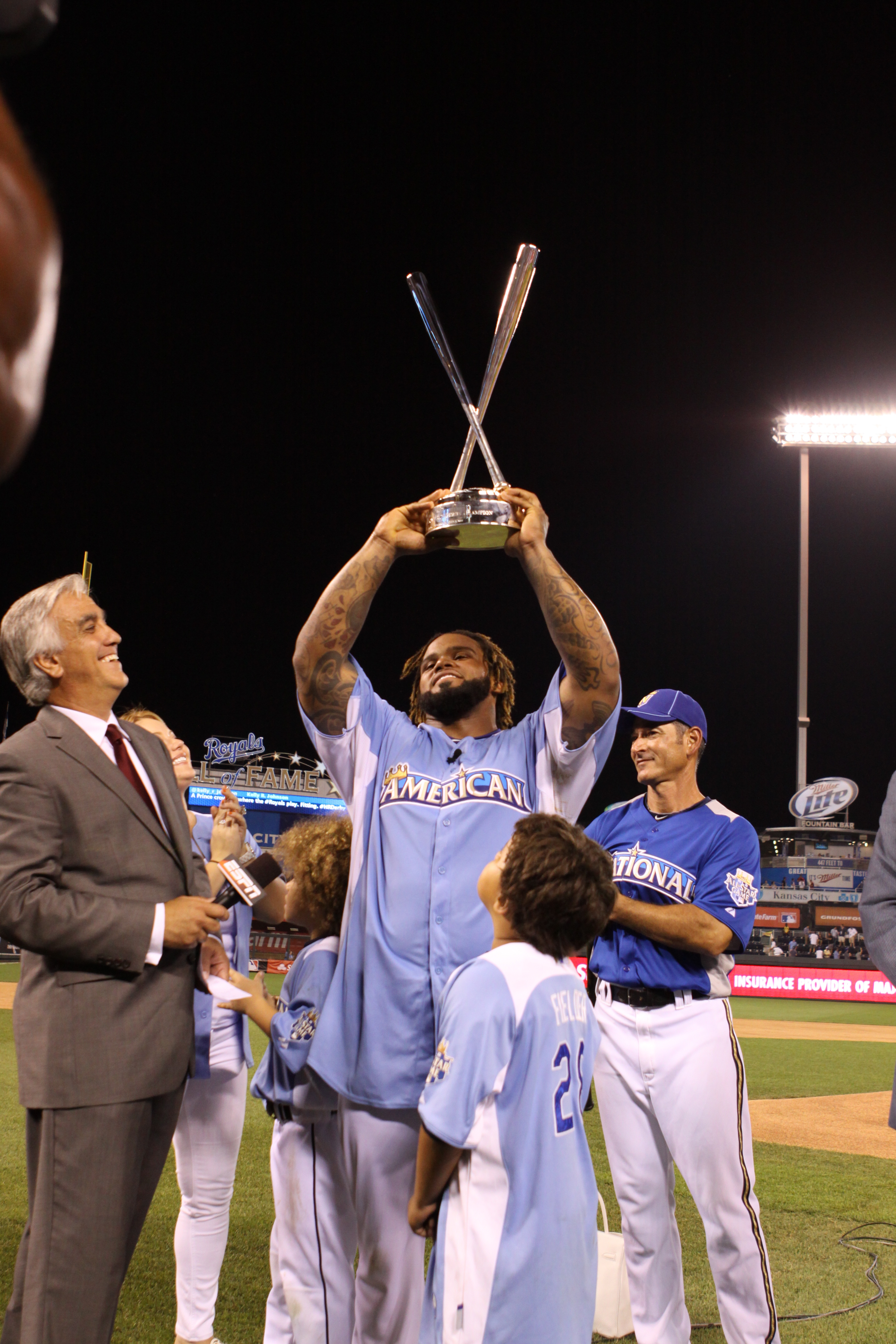
Prince Fielder accepting his second trophy in 2012

Key
^	Indicates multiple winners in the same year
†	Member of the Baseball Hall of Fame
*	Player not selected for the MLB All-Star Game

Year	Winner	Team	League	Stadium (host team)
1985	Dave Parker^{†}	Cincinnati Reds	NL	Hubert H. Humphrey Metrodome (MIN)
1986^	Wally Joyner	California Angels	AL	Astrodome (HOU)
1986^	Darryl Strawberry	New York Mets	NL	Astrodome (HOU)
1987	Andre Dawson^{†}	Chicago Cubs	NL	Oakland–Alameda County Coliseum (OAK)
1988	Cancelled			
1989^	Eric Davis	Cincinnati Reds	NL	Anaheim Stadium (CAL)
1989^	Rubén Sierra	Texas Rangers	AL	Anaheim Stadium (CAL)
1990	Ryne Sandberg^{†}	Chicago Cubs	NL	Wrigley Field (CHC)
1991	Cal Ripken Jr.^{†}	Baltimore Orioles	AL	SkyDome (TOR)
1992	Mark McGwire	Oakland Athletics	AL	Jack Murphy Stadium (SD)
1993	Juan González	Texas Rangers	AL	Oriole Park at Camden Yards (BAL)
1994	Ken Griffey Jr.^{†} (1)	Seattle Mariners	AL	Three Rivers Stadium (PIT)
1995	Frank Thomas^{†}	Chicago White Sox	AL	The Ballpark in Arlington (TEX)
1996	Barry Bonds	San Francisco Giants	NL	Veterans Stadium (PHI)
1997	Tino Martinez	New York Yankees	AL	Jacobs Field (CLE)
1998	Ken Griffey Jr.^{†} (2)	Seattle Mariners	AL	Coors Field (COL)
1999	Ken Griffey Jr.^{†} (3)	Seattle Mariners	AL	Fenway Park (BOS)
2000	Sammy Sosa	Chicago Cubs	NL	Turner Field (ATL)
2001	Luis Gonzalez	Arizona Diamondbacks	NL	Safeco Field (SEA)
2002	Jason Giambi	New York Yankees	AL	Miller Park (MIL)
2003	Garret Anderson	Anaheim Angels	AL	U.S. Cellular Field (CWS)
2004	Miguel Tejada	Baltimore Orioles	AL	Minute Maid Park (HOU)
2005	Bobby Abreu	Philadelphia Phillies	NL	Comerica Park (DET)
2006	Ryan Howard	Philadelphia Phillies	NL	PNC Park (PIT)
2007	Vladimir Guerrero^{†}	Los Angeles Angels of Anaheim	AL	AT&T Park (SF)
2008	Justin Morneau	Minnesota Twins	AL	Yankee Stadium (NYY)
2009	Prince Fielder (1)	Milwaukee Brewers	NL	Busch Stadium (STL)
2010	David Ortiz^{†}	Boston Red Sox	AL	Angel Stadium (LAA)
2011	Robinson Canó	New York Yankees	AL	Chase Field (AZ)
2012	Prince Fielder (2)	Detroit Tigers	AL	Kauffman Stadium (KC)
2013	Yoenis Céspedes (1)*	Oakland Athletics	AL	Citi Field (NYM)
2014	Yoenis Céspedes (2)	Oakland Athletics	AL	Target Field (MIN)
2015	Todd Frazier	Cincinnati Reds	NL	Great American Ball Park (CIN)
2016	Giancarlo Stanton*	Miami Marlins	NL	Petco Park (SD)
2017	Aaron Judge	New York Yankees	AL	Marlins Park (MIA)
2018	Bryce Harper	Washington Nationals	NL	Nationals Park (WSH)
2019	Pete Alonso (1)	New York Mets	NL	Progressive Field (CLE)
2020	Cancelled			
2021	Pete Alonso (2)*	New York Mets	NL	Coors Field (COL)
2022	Juan Soto	Washington Nationals	NL	Dodger Stadium (LAD)
2023	Vladimir Guerrero Jr.	Toronto Blue Jays	AL	T-Mobile Park (SEA)
2024	Teoscar Hernández	Los Angeles Dodgers	NL	Globe Life Field (TEX)
2025	Cal Raleigh	Seattle Mariners	AL	Truist Park (ATL)
2026	Jordan Walker	St. Louis Cardinals	NL	Citizens Bank Park (PHI)

== Records ==
=== Most home runs in a single round ===
Note: these numbers include swingoffs.

Rank	Player	Team	Round	Total
1	Julio Rodríguez	Seattle Mariners	2023 First Round	41
2	Vladimir Guerrero Jr.	Toronto Blue Jays	2019 Second Round	40
3	Joc Pederson	Los Angeles Dodgers	2019 Second Round	39
4	Pete Alonso	New York Mets	2021 First Round	35
4	Randy Arozarena	Tampa Bay Rays	2023 Second Round	35
5	Julio Rodríguez	Seattle Mariners	2022 First Round	32

=== Most single-derby home runs ===
Note: these numbers include swingoffs.

Rank	Player	Team	Year	Total
1	Vladimir Guerrero Jr.	Toronto Blue Jays	2019	91
2	Randy Arozarena	Tampa Bay Rays	2023	82
3	Julio Rodríguez	Seattle Mariners	2022	81
4	Pete Alonso	New York Mets	2021	74
5	Vladimir Guerrero Jr.	Toronto Blue Jays	2023	72
6	Julio Rodríguez	Seattle Mariners	2023	61
6	Giancarlo Stanton	Miami Marlins	2016	61
8	Joc Pederson	Los Angeles Dodgers	2019	60
9	Trey Mancini	Baltimore Orioles	2021	59
10	Pete Alonso	New York Mets	2019	57

=== Most all-time home runs ===
Note: these numbers include swingoffs.

Rank	Player	Team(s)	Year(s)	Total
1	Pete Alonso	New York Mets	5 - 2019, 2021–2024	207
2	Vladimir Guerrero Jr.	Toronto Blue Jays	2 - 2019, 2023	163
3	Julio Rodríguez	Seattle Mariners	2 - 2022–2023	142
4	Albert Pujols	St. Louis Cardinals, Los Angeles Angels	5 - 2003, 2007, 2009, 2015, 2022	106
5	Joc Pederson	Los Angeles Dodgers	2 - 2015, 2019	99
5	Juan Soto	Washington Nationals	2 - 2021–2022	99
7	Todd Frazier	Cincinnati Reds, Chicago White Sox	3 - 2014–2016	91
8	Giancarlo Stanton	Miami Marlins	3 - 2014, 2016–2017	83
9	Randy Arozarena	Tampa Bay Rays	1 - 2023	82
10	Prince Fielder	Milwaukee Brewers, Detroit Tigers	2 - 2009, 2012	81

=== Wins by team ===
Rank	Team	Wins	Years
1	New York Yankees	4	1997, 2002, 2011, 2017
1	Seattle Mariners	4	1994, 1998, 1999, 2025
2	Los Angeles Angels	3	1986*, 2003, 2007
2	Oakland Athletics	3	1992, 2013, 2014
2	Chicago Cubs	3	1987, 1990, 2000
2	Cincinnati Reds	3	1985, 1989*, 2015
2	New York Mets	3	1986*, 2019, 2021
8	Baltimore Orioles	2	1991, 2004
8	Philadelphia Phillies	2	2005, 2006
8	Texas Rangers	2	1989*, 1993
8	Washington Nationals	2	2018, 2022
12	Chicago White Sox	1	1995
12	San Francisco Giants	1	1996
12	Arizona Diamondbacks	1	2001
12	Minnesota Twins	1	2008
12	Milwaukee Brewers	1	2009
12	Boston Red Sox	1	2010
12	Detroit Tigers	1	2012
12	Miami Marlins	1	2016
12	Toronto Blue Jays	1	2023
12	Los Angeles Dodgers	1	2024
12	St. Louis Cardinals	1	2026

*In 1986, Wally Joyner of the California Angels and Darryl Strawberry of the New York Mets were declared co-champions.
*In 1989, Eric Davis of the Cincinnati Reds and Ruben Sierra of the Texas Rangers were declared co-champions.

=== Wins by Position ===
Position	Wins
1B	12
RF	12
CF	7
LF	4
2B	2
SS	2
C	1
3B	1
DH	1

== Complete scoreboard ==
Key
†	Member of the Baseball Hall of Fame

=== 1980s ===
==== 1985 ====
The Metrodome, Minneapolis—A.L. 17, N.L. 16
Player	Team	Home runs
American League
Jim Rice^{†}	Boston	4
Eddie Murray^{†}	Baltimore	4
Carlton Fisk^{†}	Chicago	4
Tom Brunansky	Minnesota	4
Cal Ripken Jr.^{†}	Baltimore	1
National League
Dave Parker^{†}	Cincinnati	6
Dale Murphy	Atlanta	4
Steve Garvey	San Diego	2
Ryne Sandberg^{†}	Chicago	2
Jack Clark	St. Louis	2

==== 1986 ====
Astrodome, Houston—N.L. 8, A.L. 7
Player	Team	Home runs
American League
Wally Joyner	California	4
Jesse Barfield	Toronto	2
Jose Canseco	Oakland	1
National League
Darryl Strawberry	New York	4
Dave Parker^{†}	Cincinnati	3
Hubie Brooks	Montreal	1

==== 1987 ====
Oakland Coliseum, Oakland—N.L. 6, A.L. 2
Player	Team	Home runs
American League
George Bell	Toronto	1
Mark McGwire	Oakland	1
National League
Andre Dawson^{†}	Chicago	4
Ozzie Virgil Jr.	Atlanta	2

==== 1988 ====
Home Run Derby canceled due to rain.

==== 1989 ====
Anaheim Stadium, Anaheim—N.L. 9, A.L. 5
Player	Team	Home runs
American League
Rubén Sierra	Texas	3
Mickey Tettleton	Baltimore	1
Bo Jackson	Kansas City	1
Gary Gaetti	Minnesota	0
National League
Eric Davis	Cincinnati	3
Glenn Davis	Houston	2
Howard Johnson	New York	2
Kevin Mitchell	San Francisco	2

=== 1990s ===
==== 1990 ====
Wrigley Field, Chicago—N.L. 4, A.L. 1
Player	Team	Home runs
American League
Mark McGwire	Oakland	1
Ken Griffey Jr.^{†}	Seattle	0
Jose Canseco	Oakland	0
Cecil Fielder	Detroit	0
National League
Ryne Sandberg^{†}	Chicago	3
Matt Williams	San Francisco	1
Bobby Bonilla	Pittsburgh	0
Darryl Strawberry	New York	0

==== 1991 ====
SkyDome, Toronto—A.L. 20, N.L. 7
Player	Team	Home runs
American League
Cal Ripken Jr.^{†}	Baltimore	12
Cecil Fielder	Detroit	4
Joe Carter	Toronto	2
Danny Tartabull	Kansas City	2
National League
Paul O'Neill	Cincinnati	5
George Bell	Chicago	2
Chris Sabo	Cincinnati	0
Howard Johnson	New York	0

==== 1992 ====
Jack Murphy Stadium, San Diego—A.L. 27, N.L. 13
Player	Team	Home runs
American League
Mark McGwire	Oakland	12
Ken Griffey Jr.^{†}	Seattle	7
Joe Carter	Toronto	4
Cal Ripken Jr.^{†}	Baltimore	4
National League
Larry Walker^{†}	Montreal	4
Gary Sheffield	San Diego	4
Fred McGriff^{†}	San Diego	3
Barry Bonds	Pittsburgh	2

==== 1993 ====
Camden Yards, Baltimore—A.L. 20, N.L. 12
Player	Team	Home runs
American League
Juan González	Texas	7
Ken Griffey Jr.^{†}	Seattle	7 *
Cecil Fielder	Detroit	4
Albert Belle	Cleveland	3
National League
Barry Bonds	San Francisco	5
Bobby Bonilla	New York	5
David Justice	Atlanta	2
Mike Piazza^{†}	Los Angeles	0

* Lost in playoff to Gonzalez

==== 1994 ====
Three Rivers Stadium, Pittsburgh—A.L. 17, N.L. 11
Player	Team	Home runs
American League
Ken Griffey Jr.^{†}	Seattle	7
Rubén Sierra	Oakland	4
Frank Thomas^{†}	Chicago	4
Albert Belle	Cleveland	2
National League
Fred McGriff^{†}	Atlanta	5
Jeff Bagwell^{†}	Houston	3
Dante Bichette	Colorado	3
Mike Piazza^{†}	Los Angeles	0

==== 1995 ====
The Ballpark in Arlington, Arlington—A.L. 40, N.L. 12
Player	Team	Home runs
American League
Frank Thomas^{†}	Chicago	15 *
Albert Belle	Cleveland	16
Mo Vaughn	Boston	6
Manny Ramirez	Cleveland	3
National League
Ron Gant	Cincinnati	6
Sammy Sosa	Chicago	2
Reggie Sanders	Cincinnati	2
Raúl Mondesí	Los Angeles	2

* Beat Belle in finals

==== 1996 ====
Veterans Stadium, Philadelphia—A.L. 36, N.L. 23
Player	Team	Home runs
American League
Mark McGwire	Oakland	15
Brady Anderson	Baltimore	11
Jay Buhner	Seattle	8
Joe Carter	Toronto	2
Greg Vaughn	Milwaukee	0
National League
Barry Bonds	San Francisco	17
Henry Rodríguez	Montreal	3
Jeff Bagwell^{†}	Houston	2
Ellis Burks	Colorado	1
Gary Sheffield	Florida	0

==== 1997 ====
Jacobs Field, Cleveland—A.L. 32, N.L. 29
Player	Team	Home runs
American League
Tino Martinez	New York	16 *
Mark McGwire	Oakland	7
Brady Anderson	Baltimore	4
Ken Griffey Jr.^{†}	Seattle	3
Nomar Garciaparra	Boston	0
Jim Thome^{†}	Cleveland	0
National League
Larry Walker^{†}	Colorado	19
Jeff Bagwell^{†}	Houston	5
Chipper Jones^{†}	Atlanta	3
Ray Lankford	St. Louis	2

* Beat Walker in finals

==== 1998 ====
Coors Field, Denver—A.L. 53, N.L. 29
Player	Team	Home runs
American League
Ken Griffey Jr.^{†}	Seattle	19
Rafael Palmeiro	Baltimore	10
Jim Thome^{†}	Cleveland	17
Alex Rodriguez	Seattle	5
Damion Easley	Detroit	2
National League
Vinny Castilla	Colorado	12
Moisés Alou	Houston	7
Javy López	Atlanta	5
Mark McGwire	St. Louis	4
Chipper Jones^{†}	Atlanta	1

==== 1999 ====
Fenway Park, Boston—N.L. 39, A.L. 23
Player	Team	Home runs
American League
Ken Griffey Jr.^{†}	Seattle	16
Nomar Garciaparra	Boston	2
B. J. Surhoff	Baltimore	2
Shawn Green	Toronto	2
John Jaha	Oakland	1
National League
Jeromy Burnitz	Milwaukee	14
Mark McGwire	St. Louis	16 *
Jeff Bagwell^{†}	Houston	6
Larry Walker^{†}	Colorado	2
Sammy Sosa	Chicago	1

* Lost to Burnitz in round 2

=== 2000s ===
==== 2000 ====
Turner Field, Atlanta—N.L. 41, A.L. 21
Player	Team	Round 1	Semis	Finals	Total
Sammy Sosa	Cubs	6	11	9	26
Ken Griffey Jr.^{†}	Reds	6	3	2	11
Carl Everett	Red Sox	6	6	–	12
Carlos Delgado	Blue Jays	5	1	–	6
Edgar Martínez^{†}	Mariners	2	–	–	2
Chipper Jones^{†}	Braves	2	–	–	2
Vladimir Guerrero^{†}	Expos	2	–	–	2
Iván Rodríguez^{†}	Rangers	1	–	–	1

Semifinals
1	Ken Griffey Jr.^{†}	3
4	Carlos Delgado	1
2	Carl Everett	6
3	Sammy Sosa	11

Finals
1	Ken Griffey Jr.^{†}	2
3	Sammy Sosa	9

==== 2001 ====
Safeco Field, Seattle—N.L. 41, A.L. 25
Player	Team	Round 1	Semis	Finals	Totals
Luis Gonzalez	Diamondbacks	5	5	6	16
Sammy Sosa	Cubs	3	8	2	13
Jason Giambi	Athletics	14	6	–	20
Barry Bonds	Giants	7	3	–	10
Bret Boone	Mariners	3	–	–	3
Todd Helton	Rockies	2	–	–	2
Alex Rodriguez	Rangers	2	–	–	2
Troy Glaus	Angels	0	–	–	0

Semifinals
1	Jason Giambi	6
4	Sammy Sosa	8
2	Barry Bonds	3
3	Luis Gonzalez	5

Finals
4	Sammy Sosa	2
3	Luis Gonzalez	6

==== 2002 ====
Miller Park, Milwaukee—A.L. 42, N.L. 31
Player	Team	Round 1	Semis	Finals	Totals
Jason Giambi	Yankees	11	6	7	24
Sammy Sosa	Cubs	12	5	1	18
Paul Konerko	White Sox	6	6	–	12
Richie Sexson	Brewers	6	4	–	10
Torii Hunter	Twins	3	–	–	3
Barry Bonds	Giants	2	–	–	2
Alex Rodriguez	Rangers	2	–	–	2
Lance Berkman	Astros	1	–	–	1

Semifinals
1	Sammy Sosa	5
4	Richie Sexson	4
2	Jason Giambi	7
3	Paul Konerko	6

Finals
1	Jason Giambi	7
2	Sammy Sosa	1

* Giambi defeated Konerko in a swing off

==== 2003 ====
U.S. Cellular Field, Chicago—A.L. 47, N.L. 39
Player	Team	Round 1	Semis	Finals	Total
Garret Anderson	Angels	7	6	9	22
Albert Pujols	Cardinals	4	14	8	26
Jason Giambi	Yankees	12	11	–	23
Jim Edmonds	Cardinals	4	4	–	8
Gary Sheffield	Braves	4	–	–	4
Carlos Delgado	Blue Jays	2	–	–	3
Richie Sexson	Brewers	1	–	–	1
Bret Boone	Mariners	0	–	–	0

Semifinals
1	Jason Giambi	11
4	Albert Pujols	14
2	Garret Anderson	6
3	Jim Edmonds	4

Finals
4	Albert Pujols	8
2	Garret Anderson	9

==== 2004 ====
Minute Maid Park, Houston—A.L. 47, N.L. 41
Player	Team	Round 1	Semis	Finals	Total
Miguel Tejada	Orioles	7	15	5	27
Lance Berkman	Astros	7	10	4	21
Rafael Palmeiro	Orioles	9	5	–	14
Barry Bonds	Giants	8	3	–	11
Sammy Sosa	Cubs	5	–	–	5
Jim Thome^{†}	Phillies	4	–	–	4
Hank Blalock	Rangers	3	–	–	3
David Ortiz^{†}	Red Sox	3	–	–	3

==== 2005 ====
Comerica Park, Detroit—N.L. 66, A.L. 42
Player	Home Country	Team	Round 1	Semis	Finals	Totals
Bobby Abreu	Venezuela	Phillies	24	6	11	41^{*}
Iván Rodríguez^{†}	Puerto Rico	Tigers	7	8	5	20
David Ortiz^{†}	Dominican Republic	Red Sox	17	3	–	20
Carlos Lee	Panama	Brewers	11	4	–	15
Hee-seop Choi	South Korea	Dodgers	5	–	–	5
Andruw Jones	Netherlands	Braves	5	–	–	5
Mark Teixeira	United States	Rangers	2	–	–	2
Jason Bay	Canada	Pirates	0	–	–	0

* Total rounds record.

==== 2006 ====
PNC Park, Pittsburgh—N.L. 62, A.L. 24
Player	Team	Round 1	Round 2	Subtotal	Finals	Total
Ryan Howard	Phillies	8	10	18	5	23
David Wright	Mets	16	2	18	4	22
Miguel Cabrera	Marlins	9	6	15	–	15
David Ortiz^{†}	Red Sox	10	3	13	–	13
Jermaine Dye	White Sox	7	–	7	–	7
Lance Berkman	Astros	3	–	3	–	3
Miguel Tejada	Orioles	3	–	3	–	3
Troy Glaus	Blue Jays	1	–	1	–	1

==== 2007 ====
AT&T Park, San Francisco—A.L. 42, N.L. 32
Player	Team	Round 1	Round 2	Subtotal	Finals	Total
Vladimir Guerrero^{†}	Angels	5	9	14	3^{a}	17
Alex Ríos	Blue Jays	5	12	17	2	19
Matt Holliday	Rockies	5	8	13	–	13
Albert Pujols	Cardinals	4 (2)	9	13	–	13
Justin Morneau	Twins	4 (1)	–	4	–	4
Prince Fielder	Brewers	3	–	3	–	3
Ryan Howard	Phillies	3	–	3	–	3
Magglio Ordóñez	Tigers	2	–	2	–	2

Notes:
^aRecorded only seven of ten outs before hitting winning home run.
Italicized numbers denote swing-offs.

==== 2008 ====
Yankee Stadium, New York—A.L. 66, N.L. 39
Player	Team	Round 1	Round 2	Subtotal	Finals	Total
Justin Morneau	Twins	8	9	17	5	22
Josh Hamilton	Rangers	28^{a}	4^{b}	32	3	35
Lance Berkman	Astros	8	6	14	–	14
Ryan Braun	Brewers	7	7	14	–	14
Dan Uggla	Marlins	6	–	6	–	6
Grady Sizemore	Indians	6	–	6	–	6
Chase Utley	Phillies	5	–	5	–	5
Evan Longoria	Rays	3	–	3	–	3

Notes:
^aNew single round record.
^bVoluntarily ended round with four outs.

==== 2009 ====
Busch Stadium, St. Louis—N.L. 51, A.L. 31
Player	Team	Round 1	Round 2	Subtotal	Finals	Total
Prince Fielder	Brewers	11	6	17	6	23
Nelson Cruz	Rangers	11	5	16	5	21
Ryan Howard	Phillies	7	8	15	–	15
Albert Pujols	Cardinals	5 (2)	6	11	–	11
Carlos Peña	Rays	5 (1)	–	5	–	5
Joe Mauer^{†}	Twins	5 (0)	–	5	–	5
Adrián González	Padres	2	–	2	–	2
Brandon Inge	Tigers	0	–	0	–	0

Notes:
Italicized numbers denote swing-offs.

=== 2010s ===
==== 2010 ====
Angel Stadium of Anaheim, Anaheim—A.L. 50, N.L. 45
Player	Team	Round 1	Round 2	Subtotal	Finals	Total
David Ortiz^{†}	Red Sox	8	13	21	11	32
Hanley Ramírez	Marlins	9	12	21	5	26
Corey Hart	Brewers	13	0	13	–	13
Miguel Cabrera	Tigers	7	5	12	–	12
Matt Holliday	Cardinals	5	–	5	–	5
Nick Swisher	Yankees	4	–	4	–	4
Vernon Wells	Blue Jays	2	–	2	–	2
Chris Young	Diamondbacks	1	–	1	–	1

==== 2011 ====
Chase Field, Phoenix—A.L. 76, N.L. 19
Player	Team	Round 1	Round 2	Subtotal	Finals	Total
Robinson Canó	Yankees	8	12	20	12	32
Adrián González	Red Sox	9	11	20	11	31
Prince Fielder	Brewers	5 (5)	4	9	–	9
David Ortiz^{†}	Red Sox	5 (4)	4	9	–	9
Matt Holliday	Cardinals	5 (2)	–	5	–	5
José Bautista	Blue Jays	4	–	4	–	4
Rickie Weeks Jr.	Brewers	3	–	3	–	3
Matt Kemp	Dodgers	2	–	2	–	2

Notes:
Italicized numbers denote swing-offs.

==== 2012 ====
Kauffman Stadium, Kansas City—A.L. 61, N.L. 21
Player	Team	Round 1	Round 2	Subtotal	Finals	Total
Prince Fielder	Tigers	5	11	16	12	28
José Bautista	Blue Jays	11	2	13 (2)	7	20
Mark Trumbo	Angels	7	6	13 (1)	—	13
Carlos Beltrán	Cardinals	7	5	12	—	12
Carlos González	Rockies	4	—	4	—	4
Andrew McCutchen	Pirates	4	—	4	—	4
Matt Kemp	Dodgers	1	—	1	—	1
Robinson Canó	Yankees	0	—	0	—	0

Notes:
Italicized numbers denote swing-offs.

==== 2013 ====
Citi Field, New York—A.L. 53, N.L. 50
Player	Team	Round 1	Round 2	Subtotal	Finals	Total
Yoenis Céspedes	Athletics	17	6	23	9^{a}	32
Bryce Harper	Nationals	8	8	16	8	24
Michael Cuddyer	Rockies	7	8	15	—	15
Chris Davis	Orioles	8	4	12	—	12
Pedro Álvarez	Pirates	6	—	6	—	6
Prince Fielder	Tigers	5	—	5	—	5
David Wright	Mets	5	—	5	—	5
Robinson Canó	Yankees	4	—	4	—	4

Note:
^aRecorded only five of ten outs before hitting winning home run.

==== 2014 ====
Target Field, Minneapolis — A.L. 54, N.L. 24
American League
Player	Team	Round 1	Round 2	Round 3	Finals	Total
Yoenis Céspedes	Athletics	3 (2)	9	7	9	28
José Bautista	Blue Jays	10	*	4	−	14
Adam Jones	Orioles	4	3	−	−	7
Josh Donaldson	Athletics	3 (1)	−	−	−	3
Brian Dozier	Twins	2	−	−	−	2
National League
Player	Team	Round 1	Round 2	Round 3	Finals	Total
Todd Frazier	Reds	2 (1)	6	1	1	10
Giancarlo Stanton	Marlins	6	*	0	−	6
Troy Tulowitzki	Rockies	4	2	−	−	6
Justin Morneau	Rockies	2 (0)	−	−	−	2
Yasiel Puig	Dodgers	0	−	−	−	0

* designates bye round.
(designates swing off home runs).

Round 2
American League
2	Adam Jones	3
3	Yoenis Céspedes	9
National League
2	Troy Tulowitzki	2
3	Todd Frazier	6

Round 3 (Semifinals)
1	José Bautista	4
3	Yoenis Céspedes	7
1	Giancarlo Stanton	0
3	Todd Frazier	1

Finals
3	Yoenis Céspedes	9
3	Todd Frazier	1

==== 2015 ====
Quarterfinals
1	Albert Pujols (LAA)	10
8	Kris Bryant (CHC)	9
4	Joc Pederson (LAD)	13
5	Manny Machado (BAL)	12
3	Josh Donaldson (TOR)	9
6	Anthony Rizzo (CHC)	8
2	Todd Frazier (CIN)	14
7	Prince Fielder (TEX)	13

Semifinals
1	Albert Pujols	11
4	Joc Pederson	12
3	Josh Donaldson	9
2	Todd Frazier	10

Finals
4	Joc Pederson	14
2	Todd Frazier	15

==== 2016 ====
Quarterfinals
1	Mark Trumbo (BAL)	16
8	Corey Seager (LAD)	15
4	Robinson Canó (SEA)	7
5	Giancarlo Stanton (MIA)	24
3	Adam Duvall (CIN)	11
6	Wil Myers (SD)	10
2	Todd Frazier (CWS)	13
7	Carlos González (COL)	12

Semifinals
1	Mark Trumbo	14
5	Giancarlo Stanton	17
3	Adam Duvall	15
2	Todd Frazier	16

Finals
5	Giancarlo Stanton	20
2	Todd Frazier	13

==== 2017 ====
Quarterfinals
1	Giancarlo Stanton (MIA)	16
8	Gary Sánchez (NYY)	17
4	Mike Moustakas (KC)	10
5	Miguel Sanó (MIN)	11
3	Cody Bellinger (LAD)	15
6	Charlie Blackmon (COL)	14
2	Aaron Judge (NYY)	23
7	Justin Bour (MIA)	22

Semifinals
8	Gary Sánchez	10
5	Miguel Sanó	11
3	Cody Bellinger	12
2	Aaron Judge	13

Finals
5	Miguel Sanó	10
2	Aaron Judge	11

==== 2018 ====
Quarterfinals
1	Jesús Aguilar (MIL)	12
8	Rhys Hoskins (PHI)	17
4	Alex Bregman (HOU)	15
5	Kyle Schwarber (CHC)	16
3	Max Muncy (LAD)	17
6	Javier Báez (CHC)	16
2	Bryce Harper (WAS)	13
7	Freddie Freeman (ATL)	12

Semifinals
8	Rhys Hoskins	20
5	Kyle Schwarber	21
3	Max Muncy	12
2	Bryce Harper	13

Finals
5	Kyle Schwarber	18
2	Bryce Harper	19

==== 2019 ====
Quarterfinals
1	Matt Chapman (OAK)	13
8	Vladimir Guerrero Jr. (TOR)	29
4	Alex Bregman (HOU)	16
5	Joc Pederson (LAD)	21
3	Josh Bell (PIT)	18
6	Ronald Acuña Jr. (ATL)	25
2	Pete Alonso (NYM)	14
7	Carlos Santana (CLE)	13

Semifinals
8	Vladimir Guerrero Jr.	40*
5	Joc Pederson	39
6	Ronald Acuña Jr.	19
2	Pete Alonso	20

Finals
8	Vladimir Guerrero Jr.	22
2	Pete Alonso	23

* Round went into three swing-offs after Guerrero Jr. and Pederson were tied with 29 home runs each.

=== 2020s ===
==== 2020 ====
Home Run Derby canceled due to COVID-19 pandemic.

==== 2021 ====
Quarterfinals
1	Shohei Ohtani (LAA)	28
8	Juan Soto (WAS)	31*
4	Salvador Pérez (KC)	28
5	Pete Alonso (NYM)	35
3	Matt Olson (OAK)	23
6	Trey Mancini (BAL)	24
2	Joey Gallo (TEX)	19
7	Trevor Story (COL)	20

Semifinals
8	Juan Soto	15
5	Pete Alonso	16
6	Trey Mancini	13
7	Trevor Story	12

Finals
5	Pete Alonso	23
6	Trey Mancini	22

* Went to a three-pitch swing-off after Soto and Ohtani tied at 22 home runs in first attempt and 28 home runs in tiebreaker. Soto went first and homered on all three pitches; Going second, Ohtani failed to hit a home run on his first pitch and was thus eliminated.

==== 2022 ====
Quarterfinals
1	Kyle Schwarber (PHI)	19
8	Albert Pujols (STL)	20*
4	Juan Soto (WAS)	18
5	José Ramírez (CLE)	17
3	Corey Seager (TEX)	24
6	Julio Rodríguez (SEA)	32
2	Pete Alonso (NYM)	20
7	Ronald Acuña Jr. (ATL)	19

Semifinals
8	Albert Pujols	15
4	Juan Soto	16
6	Julio Rodríguez	31
2	Pete Alonso	23

Finals
4	Juan Soto	19
6	Julio Rodríguez	18

* Round went into a swing-off after Pujols and Schwarber were tied 13–13 after regulation.

==== 2023 ====
Quarterfinals
1	Luis Robert Jr. (CWS)	28
8	Adley Rutschman (BAL)	27
4	Adolis García (TEX)	17
5	Randy Arozarena (TB)	24
3	Mookie Betts (LAD)	11
6	Vladimir Guerrero Jr. (TOR)	26
2	Pete Alonso (NYM)	21
7	Julio Rodríguez (SEA)	41*

Semifinals
1	Luis Robert Jr.	22
5	Randy Arozarena	35
6	Vladimir Guerrero Jr.	21
7	Julio Rodríguez	20

Finals
5	Randy Arozarena	23
6	Vladimir Guerrero Jr.	25

* Most HR ever scored in a single round

==== 2024 ====
Globe Life Field, Arlington
Player	Team	Round one	Semifinals	Finals	Total
Teoscar Hernández	Dodgers	19	14^{(2)}	14	49
Bobby Witt Jr.	Royals	20	17	13	50
Alec Bohm	Phillies	21	14^{(1)}	–	36
José Ramírez	Guardians	21	12	–	33
Adolis García	Rangers	18	–	–	18
Marcell Ozuna	Braves	16	–	–	16
Pete Alonso	Mets	12	–	–	12
Gunnar Henderson	Orioles	11	–	–	11

Semifinals
1	Alec Bohm	15
4	Teoscar Hernández	16*
3	Bobby Witt Jr.	17
2	José Ramírez	12

Finals
4	Teoscar Hernández	14
3	Bobby Witt Jr.	13

* Round went into a swing-off after Bohm and Hernández were tied 14–14 after regulation.

==== 2025 ====
Truist Park, Atlanta
Player	Team	Round one	Semifinals	Finals	Total
Cal Raleigh	Seattle Mariners	17^{#}	19	18	54
Junior Caminero	Tampa Bay Rays	21	8	15	44
Oneil Cruz	Pittsburgh Pirates	21	13	−	34
Byron Buxton	Minnesota Twins	20	7	−	27
Brent Rooker	Athletics	17^{#}	−	−	17
James Wood	Washington Nationals	16	−	−	16
Matt Olson	Atlanta Braves	15	−	−	15
Jazz Chisholm Jr.	New York Yankees	3	−	−	3

Semifinals
1	Oneil Cruz	13
4	Cal Raleigh	19
3	Byron Buxton	7
2	Junior Caminero	8

Finals
4	Cal Raleigh	18
2	Junior Caminero	15

# Raleigh advanced via distance tiebreak of .96 inches (2.4 cm).

==== 2026 ====
Citizens Bank Park, Philadelphia
Player	Team	Round one	Round two	Finals	Total
Jordan Walker	St. Louis Cardinals	13*	6	12	31
Kyle Schwarber	Philadelphia Phillies	10	9	11	30
Willson Contreras	Boston Red Sox	13*	8	−	21
Junior Caminero	Tampa Bay Rays	12	5	−	17
Munetaka Murakami	Chicago White Sox	9	−	−	9
Bryce Harper	Philadelphia Phillies	8	−	−	8
Jac Caglianone	Kansas City Royals	8	−	−	8
Ben Rice	New York Yankees	7	−	−	7

* − Contreras received the higher seed via distance tiebreaker (490 ft to 470 ft)

Round two
1	Willson Contreras	8
7	Kyle Schwarber	9
2	Jordan Walker	6
6	Junior Caminero	5

Finals
2	Jordan Walker	12
7	Kyle Schwarber	11

== See also ==
- List of Major League Baseball All-Star Games
- MLB Home Run Derby X, a global tournament started in 2022
