= 2017 Major League Baseball Home Run Derby =

Baseball competition

- Date: July 10, 2017
- Venue: Marlins Park
- City: Miami, Florida
- Winner: Aaron Judge
- Score: 11–10

The 2017 Major League Baseball Home Run Derby was a home run hitting contest between eight batters from Major League Baseball (MLB). The derby was held on July 10, 2017, at Marlins Park in Miami, Florida, the site of the 2017 MLB All-Star Game. On July 5, the participants were announced. Aaron Judge won, becoming the first rookie to win the event outright.

== Rules ==
Eight players participated in the derby in a bracket-style, single-elimination timed event. Each player had four minutes to hit as many home runs as possible. Hitters were awarded an additional 30 seconds if they hit two home runs over 440 feet (130 m). Hitters were also allowed one 45 second timeout to stop the clock (two in the finals). Homers hit off a T-Mobile Ball during the final minute resulted in a $10,000 donation to charity by T-Mobile & MLB, to the Boys & Girls Clubs of America.

The eight competing players were seeded 1-8 based on their home run totals. The higher seed hit second in any round, and the round ended if the higher seed surpassed the total of the first hitter. In the event of a tie, three sets of tiebreakers are employed: first, a 90-second swing-off (with no timeouts nor bonus time awarded); second, each player got three swings; whoever hit more home runs in the three swings would be declared the winner; thereafter, sudden death swings would occur until the tie was broken.

== Results ==
Quarterfinals
1	Giancarlo Stanton (MIA)	16
8	Gary Sánchez (NYY)	17
4	Mike Moustakas (KC)	10
5	Miguel Sanó (MIN)	11
3	Cody Bellinger (LAD)	15
6	Charlie Blackmon (COL)	14
2	Aaron Judge (NYY)	23
7	Justin Bour (MIA)	22

Semifinals
8	Gary Sánchez	10
5	Miguel Sanó	11
3	Cody Bellinger	12
2	Aaron Judge	13

Finals
5	Miguel Sanó	10
2	Aaron Judge	11
