= Ippei Mizuhara =

Japanese interpreter (born 1984)

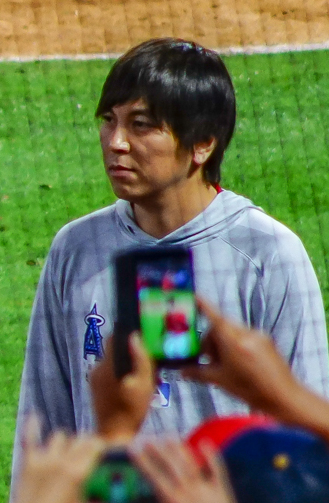
- Mizuhara in 2019
- Born: December 31, 1984 (age 41); Tomakomai, Hokkaido, Japan
- Citizenship: Japanese
- Education: Diamond Bar High School; Del Paso High School
- Occupation: Interpreter
- Known for: Interpreting for Shohei Ohtani
- Criminal charges: Bank fraud, tax fraud
- Criminal penalty: 57 months in prison plus 3 year supervised release
- Criminal status: Incarcerated at FCI Allenwood Low

Ippei Mizuhara (水原一平, Mizuhara Ippei; born December 31, 1984) is a Japanese interpreter and convicted fraudster. Mizuhara served as the interpreter for Major League Baseball player Shohei Ohtani, translating Japanese to English and vice versa for Ohtani's media appearances and teammate interactions. He previously worked for the Hokkaido Nippon-Ham Fighters of Nippon Professional Baseball (NPB) as an interpreter for several of the team's Anglophone players.

Mizuhara had gained popularity among baseball fans for his close association with Ohtani. He frequently aided Ohtani in non-interpreting contexts, such as catching his bullpen sessions or throwing with him during pregame warmups. During the 2021 MLB Home Run Derby, Mizuhara served as Ohtani's catcher.

On March 20, 2024, the Dodgers fired Mizuhara after Ohtani's representatives accused him of "massive theft" of Ohtani's funds to repay debts owed to a bookmaker. He was charged by the US government for bank fraud and tax evasion. On June 4, Mizuhara pled guilty to those charges, and he was sentenced to 57 months in prison plus three years of supervised release on February 6, 2025.

== Early life ==
Mizuhara was born on December 31, 1984, in Tomakomai, Hokkaido, Japan. His father, Hidemasa, is a chef, and the family moved to the Los Angeles area in 1991 so that he could work there. Mizuhara was raised in Diamond Bar, a city in eastern Los Angeles County. He grew up enjoying sports including soccer, baseball, and basketball. Mizuhara attended Chaparral Middle School in Diamond Bar and Diamond Bar High School. While still in high school, Mizuhara would travel 30–60 minutes to patronize tribal casinos.

He wrote on his resume and profile that he graduated from University of California, Riverside in 2007, while he was in discussions regarding aspects of his position of translator for Ohtani upon Shohei's signing with the Los Angeles Angels. In March 2024, in the wake of Mizuhara's gambling controversy, the school told KNBC-TV that "there are no records of him attending the school." At the time of his arrest, Ippei lived in Newport Beach.

Nothing is publicly known about Mizuhara's life between his 2004 graduation from high school and 2012 job interview with the Hokkaido Nippon-Ham Fighters. Investigative journalists at ESPN ran background checks and interviewed Mizuhara's friends but could not find any employers or addresses during that time.

== Career ==
In 2013, Mizuhara was hired by the Hokkaido Nippon-Ham Fighters to translate for English-speaking players including Chris Martin, Mitch Lively, and Michael Crotta. He first met Shohei Ohtani while interpreting for the Fighters as the two both arrived in 2013.

After signing Ohtani, the Los Angeles Angels hired Mizuhara to serve as Ohtani's personal interpreter. When Ohtani competed in the 2021 MLB Home Run Derby, Mizuhara was chosen as his catcher. He borrowed an extra set of equipment from Angels catcher Max Stassi and practiced with Angels infielder José Iglesias before the contest. Mizuhara had also previously caught some of Ohtani's bullpen sessions. During the 2021–22 MLB lockout, Mizuhara temporarily resigned from his position with the Angels to circumvent rules against players and personnel being in contact in order to continue working with Ohtani. Mizuhara returned to his official position as an Angels employee after the lockout ended. Mizuhara remained Ohtani's interpreter after Ohtani signed with the Los Angeles Dodgers in the 2023–24 offseason.

It was previously reported that Mizuhara worked as an interpreter for pitcher Hideki Okajima with the Boston Red Sox from 2007 to 2011. However, in March 2024, the Red Sox declared that "Mizuhara was never employed by the Boston Red Sox in any capacity". Although there are many articles and reports from media outlets stating that Mizuhara falsely claimed to have worked for the Red Sox as Okajima's interpreter, it is not clear that Mizuhara was the source of those claims. Mizuhara actually was briefly employed as Okajima's interpreter in 2011 when the reliever signed a minor league contract with the New York Yankees in 2011. After Okajima failed his physical for the Yankees before spring training, Mizuhara lost his opportunity to continue as Okajima's interpreter.

== Gambling and fraud ==
On March 20, 2024, the Dodgers fired Mizuhara. He was indebted to bookmaker Matthew Bowyer, who was under investigation by the federal government in Southern California. At least $4.5 million (approximately 680 million yen) had been transferred from Ohtani's bank account to associates of the bookmaker.

Mizuhara was in Seoul for the Dodgers' season-opening series against the San Diego Padres and was present for the first of the two games. Mizuhara admitted to having a gambling addiction in a speech to Dodgers players in the clubhouse following the March 19 game against the Padres. In that meeting, as well as in an interview he had with ESPN journalist Tisha Thompson a day earlier, Mizuhara claimed that Ohtani had transferred the funds to Bowyer to help him out of his gambling debts. However, later that evening, Berk Brettler LLP, the law firm representing Ohtani, issued a statement saying that Ohtani was a victim of "massive theft" and that the matter had been referred to the authorities.

Following Mizuhara's dismissal, team staffer Will Ireton, who had been an interpreter when Kenta Maeda played for the Dodgers, took over as Ohtani's interpreter.

On April 11, 2024, federal authorities in Southern California charged Mizuhara with one count of bank fraud after determining that he had impersonated Ohtani in conversations with his bank and had stolen over $16 million. He turned himself in the following day and was released on $25,000 bond. On June 4, Mizuhara pled guilty to one charge of bank fraud, as well as one count of submitting a false tax return. His sentencing hearing, originally scheduled for October 25, was moved to December 20 at his request. It was subsequently moved to January 24, 2025. On February 6, he was sentenced to 57 months in federal prison and three years supervised release and ordered to pay $17 million in restitution to Ohtani. Court documents later confirmed that Mizuhara was initially ordered to start his 57-month prison sentence by March 24, but his attorney, Michael G. Freedman, filed a request to move his surrender date on March 12. That request, which the judge granted, remains under court seal, and the attorney from the United States District Court for the Central District of California denied Freedman's request. He was then rescheduled to report to a federal prison by May 12, 2025, but was delayed again to his surrendering date on June 16, 2025.

On June 16, 2025, Mizuhara began serving his 57-month prison sentence at Federal Correctional Institution, Allenwood Low in Allenwood, Pennsylvania. Once Mizuhara completes his sentence, he is likely to be deported back to Japan given his felony conviction. Mizuhara is scheduled to be released from federal custody on July 1, 2029.

== Personal life ==
Mizuhara married in 2018, although he told the press in 2021 that he spent more time with Ohtani than with his own family.
