= 2008 Major League Baseball Home Run Derby =

Baseball competition

- Date: July 14, 2008
- Venue: Yankee Stadium
- City: The Bronx, New York
- Winner: Justin Morneau

The 2008 Major League Baseball Home Run Derby (known through sponsorship as the State Farm Home Run Derby) was a home run hitting contest in Major League Baseball (MLB) between four batters each from the American League and National League. The derby was held on July 14, 2008, at Yankee Stadium in the Bronx, New York City, the host location of the 2008 MLB All-Star Game. ESPN televised the event live at 8:00 PM EDT, with ESPN Radio and XM Satellite Radio handling radio broadcasting duties.

Justin Morneau of the Minnesota Twins defeated Josh Hamilton of the Texas Rangers, 5–3, in the final. In the first round, Hamilton set an MLB record for most home runs in one round of a Derby with 28, hitting 13 of them with eight outs. Seven of his home runs in the round were at least 500 feet, with one reaching 518 feet. ESPN's David Schoenfield and USA Today's Steve Gardner have ranked Hamilton's first round as the greatest Home Run Derby performance of all-time.

The eight participants were Lance Berkman of the Houston Astros, Dan Uggla of the Florida Marlins, Chase Utley of the Philadelphia Phillies, Josh Hamilton of the Texas Rangers, Ryan Braun of the Milwaukee Brewers, Grady Sizemore of the Cleveland Indians, Evan Longoria of the Tampa Bay Rays, and Justin Morneau of the Minnesota Twins.

Vladimir Guerrero of the Los Angeles Angels of Anaheim was originally going to participate to defend his 2007 title, but he ultimately declined the invitation in order to spend time with his family. Morneau became the first Canadian player to win the derby since its introduction in the 1985 MLB season.

== Pre-game entertainment ==
American rock band 3 Doors Down performed at the beginning of the Derby.

== Results ==
Yankee Stadium, New York—A.L. 66, N.L. 39
Player	Team	Round 1	Round 2	Subtotal	Finals	Total
Justin Morneau	Twins	8	9	17	5	22
Josh Hamilton	Rangers	28^{a}	4^{b}	32	3	35
Lance Berkman	Astros	8	6	14	–	14
Ryan Braun	Brewers	7	7	14	–	14
Dan Uggla	Marlins	6	–	6	–	6
Grady Sizemore	Indians	6	–	6	–	6
Chase Utley	Phillies	5	–	5	–	5
Evan Longoria	Rays	3	–	3	–	3

Notes:
^aNew single round record.
^bVoluntarily ended round with four outs.
10 Home Runs were hit while the Gold Ball (special balls used when the batters have nine outs) was in play, earning $170,000 for the Boys & Girls Clubs of America.
