= 2023 Major League Baseball Home Run Derby =

Baseball competition

- Date: July 10, 2023
- Venue: T-Mobile Park
- City: Seattle, Washington
- Winner: Vladimir Guerrero Jr.
- Score: 25–23

The 2023 Major League Baseball Home Run Derby was a home run hitting contest between eight batters from Major League Baseball (MLB). The derby was held on July 10, 2023, at T-Mobile Park in Seattle, the site of the 2023 MLB All-Star Game.

The eventual winner was Vladimir Guerrero Jr. With his win Guerrero Jr. joined his father Vladimir Guerrero (the 2007 winner) as the first father-son duo to win the Derby.

The 2023 Home Run Derby featured the highest total amount of home runs in the history of the competition, at 341.

== Rules ==
The bracket is a single-elimination bracket with three rounds total. The higher seed in each matchup always hits second.

The contestants have three minutes in the first and second rounds and two minutes in the final round to hit as many home runs as possible. The timer begins with the release of the first pitch, and the round ends when the timer hits zero. A home run will count if the timer hits zero, so long as the pitch was released beforehand. If the second contestant in the matchup exceeds their opponent's home run total, the round ends.

Each contestant receives 30 seconds of bonus time after the regulation time expires. Additionally, the contestants can receive an additional 30 seconds of bonus time if they hit at least two home runs that equals or exceeds 440 ft (134.11 m) during regulation. Each contestant is entitled to one 45-second timeout in each regulation period. Timeouts cannot be called during bonus time.

Ties in any round are broken by a 60-second tiebreaker with no bonus time or timeouts. If a tie remains, the contestants will engage in successive three-swing swing-offs until there is a winner.

The prize pool for the contestants totals $2.5 million, with the winner receiving $1 million of that total.

== Bracket ==
Quarterfinals
1 | Luis Robert Jr. (CHW) | 28
8 | Adley Rutschman (BAL) | 27
4 | Adolis García (TEX) | 17
5 | Randy Arozarena (TB) | 24
3 | Mookie Betts (LAD) | 11
6 | Vladimir Guerrero Jr. (TOR) | 26
2 | Pete Alonso (NYM) | 21
7 | Julio Rodríguez (SEA) | 41

Semifinals
1 | Luis Robert Jr. | 22
5 | Randy Arozarena | 35
6 | Vladimir Guerrero Jr. | 21
7 | Julio Rodríguez | 20

Finals
5 | Randy Arozarena | 23
6 | Vladimir Guerrero Jr. | 25
