= 2018 Major League Baseball Home Run Derby =

Baseball competition

- Date: July 16, 2018
- Venue: Nationals Park
- City: Washington, D.C.
- Winner: Bryce Harper
- Score: 19–18

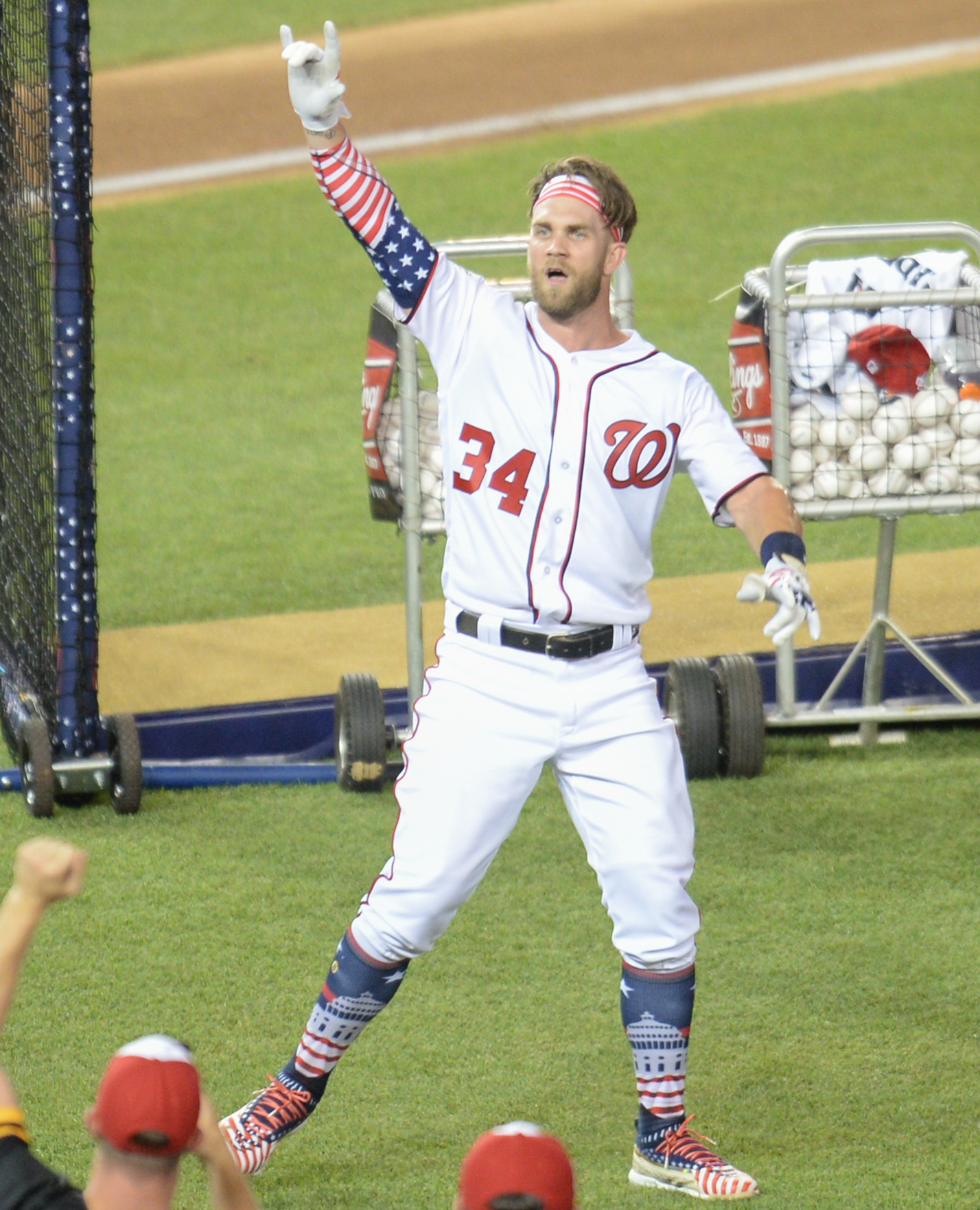
Bryce Harper celebrating at the 2018 Home Run Derby

The 2018 Major League Baseball Home Run Derby was a home run hitting contest between eight batters from Major League Baseball (MLB). The derby was held on July 16, 2018, at Nationals Park in Washington, D.C., the site of the 2018 MLB All-Star Game. On July 11, the participants were announced. Bryce Harper was the winner, as he beat Kyle Schwarber, in the final 19–18, winning the derby in front of his hometown crowd. He tied Schwarber on the last pitch as time expired in regulation; then won it with 16 seconds left in bonus time. After the derby, 14 projectors were used to light up the field; this was the first showcase of on-field projection mapping in baseball.

== Rules ==
Eight players participate in the derby in a bracket-style, single-elimination timed event. Each player has four minutes to hit as many home runs as possible. Hitters are awarded an additional 30 seconds if they hit two home runs over 440 feet (130 m). Hitters are also allowed one 45 second timeout to stop the clock (two in the finals). Homers hit off a T-Mobile Ball during the final minute result in a $10,000 donation to charity by T-Mobile & MLB, to Team Rubicon.

The eight competing players are seeded 1-8 based on their home run totals. While the lower seed hits first, the higher seed hits second in all rounds. The round ends if the higher seed exceeds the total of the first hitter. In the event of a tie, three sets of tiebreakers are employed: first, a 90-second swing-off (with no timeouts nor bonus time awarded); second, each player gets three swings; whoever hits more home runs in the three swings will be declared the winner; thereafter, sudden death swings will occur until the tie is broken.

== Bracket ==
Quarterfinals
1	Jesús Aguilar (MIL)	12
8	Rhys Hoskins (PHI)	17
4	Alex Bregman (HOU)	15
5	Kyle Schwarber (CHC)	16
3	Max Muncy (LAD)	17
6	Javier Báez (CHC)	16
2	Bryce Harper (WSH)	13
7	Freddie Freeman (ATL)	12

Semifinals
8	Rhys Hoskins (PHI)	20
5	Kyle Schwarber (CHC)	21
3	Max Muncy (LAD)	12
2	Bryce Harper (WSH)	13

Finals
5	Kyle Schwarber (CHC)	18
2	Bryce Harper (WSH)	19
