= 2022 Major League Baseball Home Run Derby =

Baseball competition

- Date: July 18, 2022
- Venue: Dodger Stadium
- City: Los Angeles, California
- Winner: Juan Soto
- Score: 19–18

The 2022 Major League Baseball Home Run Derby was a home run hitting contest between eight batters from Major League Baseball (MLB). The derby was held on July 18, 2022, at Dodger Stadium in Los Angeles, California, the site of the 2022 MLB All-Star Game.

The longest home run, among the total 291 hit by the eight players involved, covered a distance of 482 ft (146.91 m), and was hit by eventual champion Juan Soto in Round 1. With his victory, Soto, at 23 years and 266 days old, became the second youngest player to ever win the derby, one day older than Juan González when he won in 1993.

This was the third derby since the format change in 2015 to feature tie-breaking rounds, as Albert Pujols and Kyle Schwarber went to a swing-off in the first round.

== Rules ==
The bracket is a single-elimination bracket with three rounds total. The higher seed in each matchup always hits second.

The contestants have three minutes in the first and second rounds and two minutes in the final round to hit as many home runs as possible. The timer begins with the release of the first pitch, and the round ends when the timer hits zero. A home run will count if the timer hits zero, so long as the pitch was released beforehand. If the second contestant in the matchup exceeds their opponents home run total, the round ends.

Each contestant receives 30 seconds of bonus time after the regulation time expires. Additionally, the contestants can receive an additional 30 seconds of bonus time if they hit at least two home runs that equals or exceeds 440 ft (134.11 m) during regulation. Each contestant is entitled to one 45-second timeout in each regulation period. Timeouts cannot be called during bonus time.

Ties in any round are broken by a 60-second tiebreaker with no bonus time or timeouts. If a tie remains, the contestants will engage in successive three-swing swing-offs until there is a winner.

The prize pool for the contestants totals $2.5 million, with the winner receiving $1 million of that total.

== Bracket ==
The participants for the 2022 derby were New York Mets first baseman Pete Alonso (3rd appearance), Atlanta Braves outfielder Ronald Acuña Jr. (2nd appearance), St. Louis Cardinals first baseman Albert Pujols (5th appearance), Washington Nationals outfielder Juan Soto (2nd appearance), Seattle Mariners outfielder Julio Rodríguez (1st appearance), Philadelphia Phillies outfielder Kyle Schwarber (2nd appearance), Cleveland Guardians third baseman José Ramírez (1st appearance), and Texas Rangers shortstop Corey Seager (2nd appearance).

Quarterfinals
1	Kyle Schwarber (PHI)	19
8	Albert Pujols (STL)	20*
4	Juan Soto (WAS)	18
5	José Ramírez (CLE)	17
3	Corey Seager (TEX)	24
6	Julio Rodríguez (SEA)	32
2	Pete Alonso (NYM)	20
7	Ronald Acuña Jr. (ATL)	19

Semifinals
8	Albert Pujols	15
4	Juan Soto	16
6	Julio Rodríguez	31
2	Pete Alonso	23

Finals
4	Juan Soto	19
6	Julio Rodríguez	18

* Round went into a swing-off after Pujols and Schwarber were tied 13–13 after regulation.
