= 2012 Major League Baseball Home Run Derby =

Baseball competition

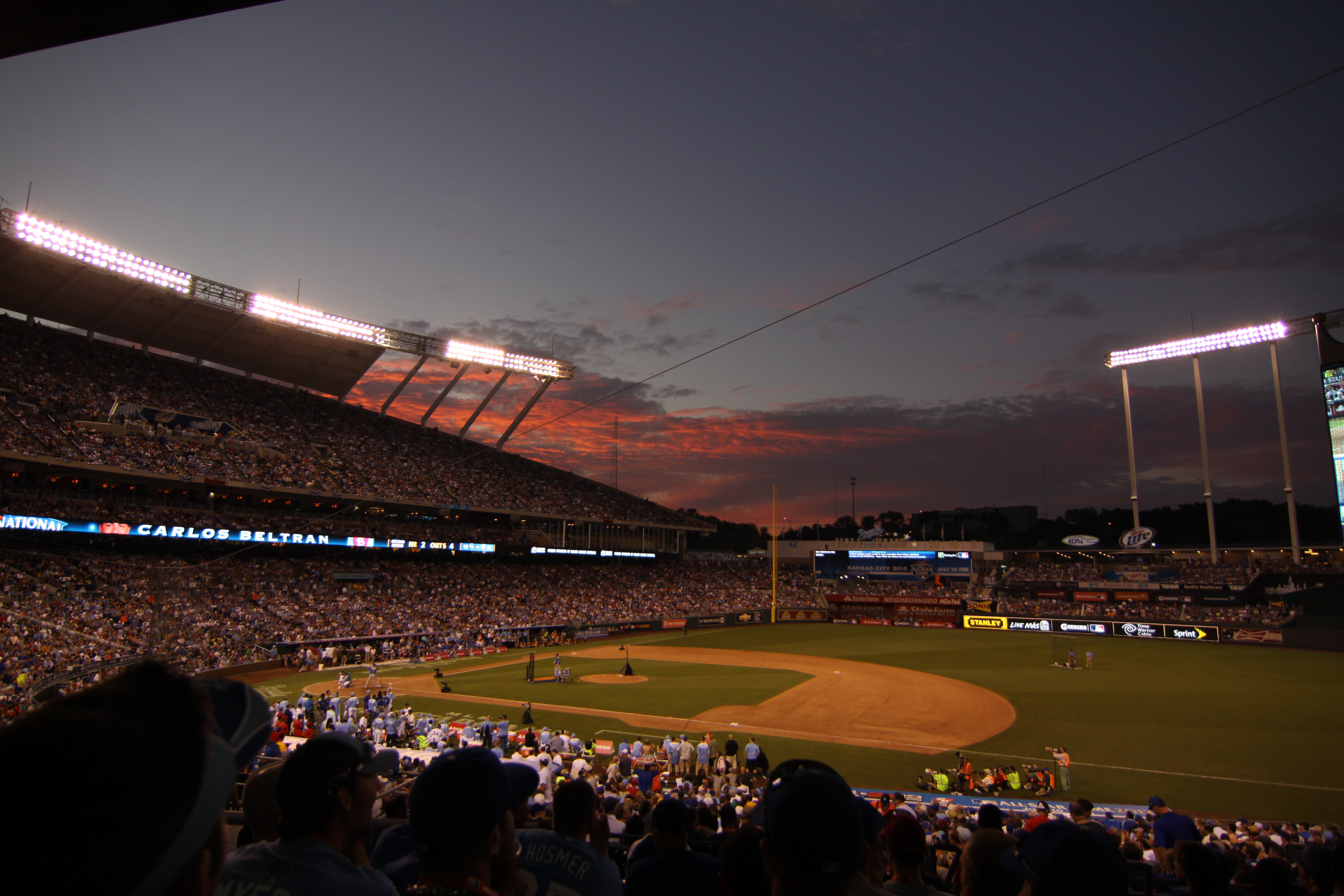
- Kauffman Stadium during the 2012 Major League Baseball Home Run Derby
- Date: July 9, 2012
- Venue: Kauffman Stadium
- City: Kansas City, Missouri
- Winner: Prince Fielder

The 2012 Major League Baseball Home Run Derby (known through sponsorship as the State Farm Home Run Derby) was a home run hitting contest in Major League Baseball (MLB) between four batters each from the American League and National League. The derby was held on July 9, 2012, at the site of the 2012 MLB All-Star Game, Kauffman Stadium in Kansas City, Missouri.

Prince Fielder won the derby with five home runs in the first round, eleven home runs in the second round, and twelve runs in the finals. His twelve home runs in the final round ties Robinson Canó's record for final round home runs, set in 2011. Fielder beat Toronto outfielder José Bautista in the final round, 12–7.

== Rules ==
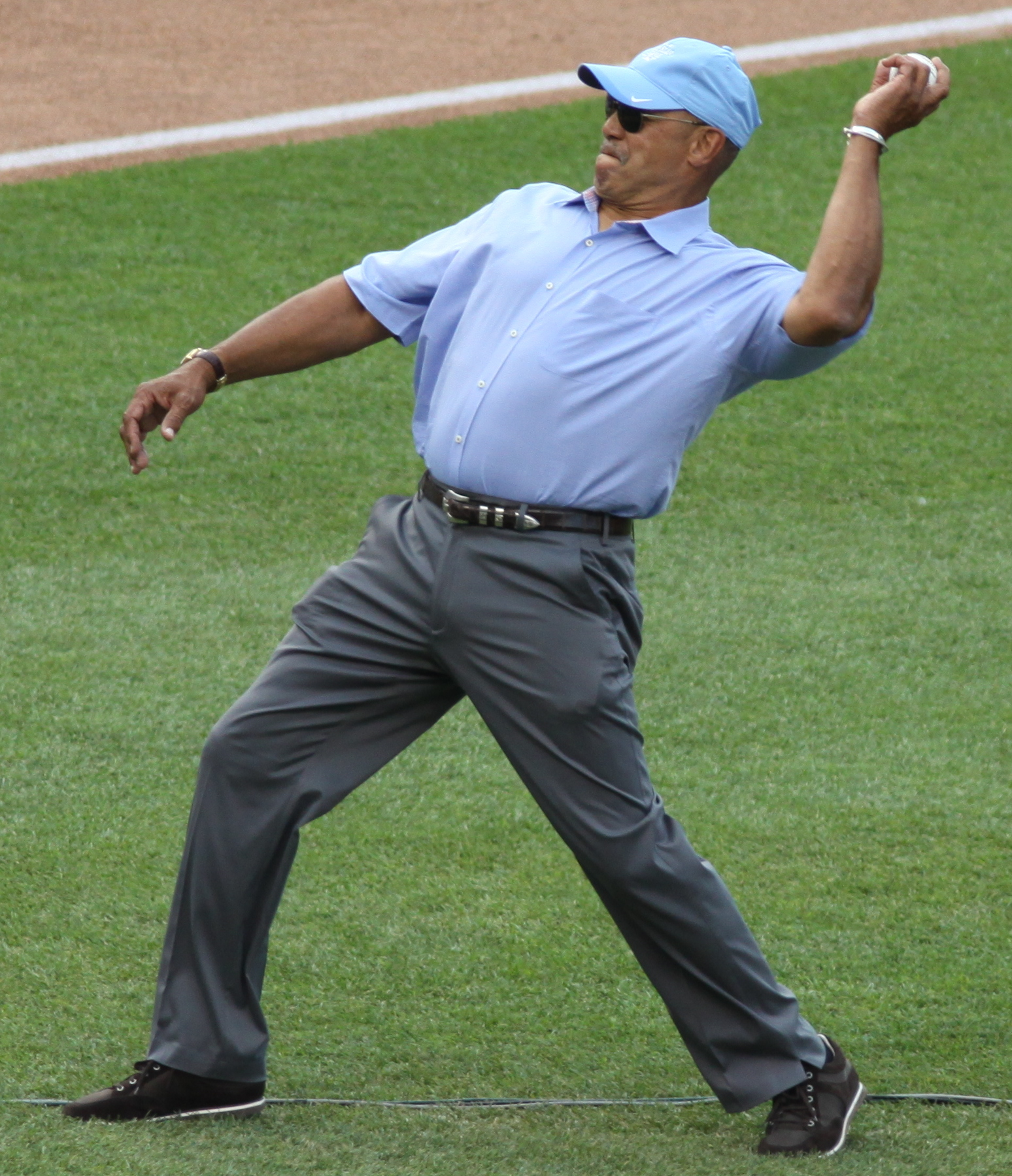
Reggie Jackson throwing out the first pitch before the Home Run Derby

Each participant is thrown pitches by a pitcher of his choice. The hitter has the option of not swinging at a pitch without penalty. If he swings at a pitch and misses or hits the pitch anywhere but in home run territory, it is considered an out. Each player hits until he records ten outs in each round. When nine outs are reached in each round, the "gold money ball" comes into play, in which State Farm donates a certain amount of money to charities if a home run is hit. This repeats until the batter records the final out.

In the first two rounds, home run totals will carry over for those rounds. Should there be a tie after either of the first two rounds, a "swing-off" takes place. In a swing-off, each tied player gets five swings to hit as many home runs as possible. If after the five swings a tie still remains, players get three more swings to determine the winner; if needed, sudden-death swings continue until one player homers. Home runs hit during a first round swing-off do not count towards the player's total going into the second round. All eight players participate in the first round; the four highest totals from round one will move to the semi-finals. The players with top two totals will face off in the finals, with the scores reset from the first two rounds.

== Results ==
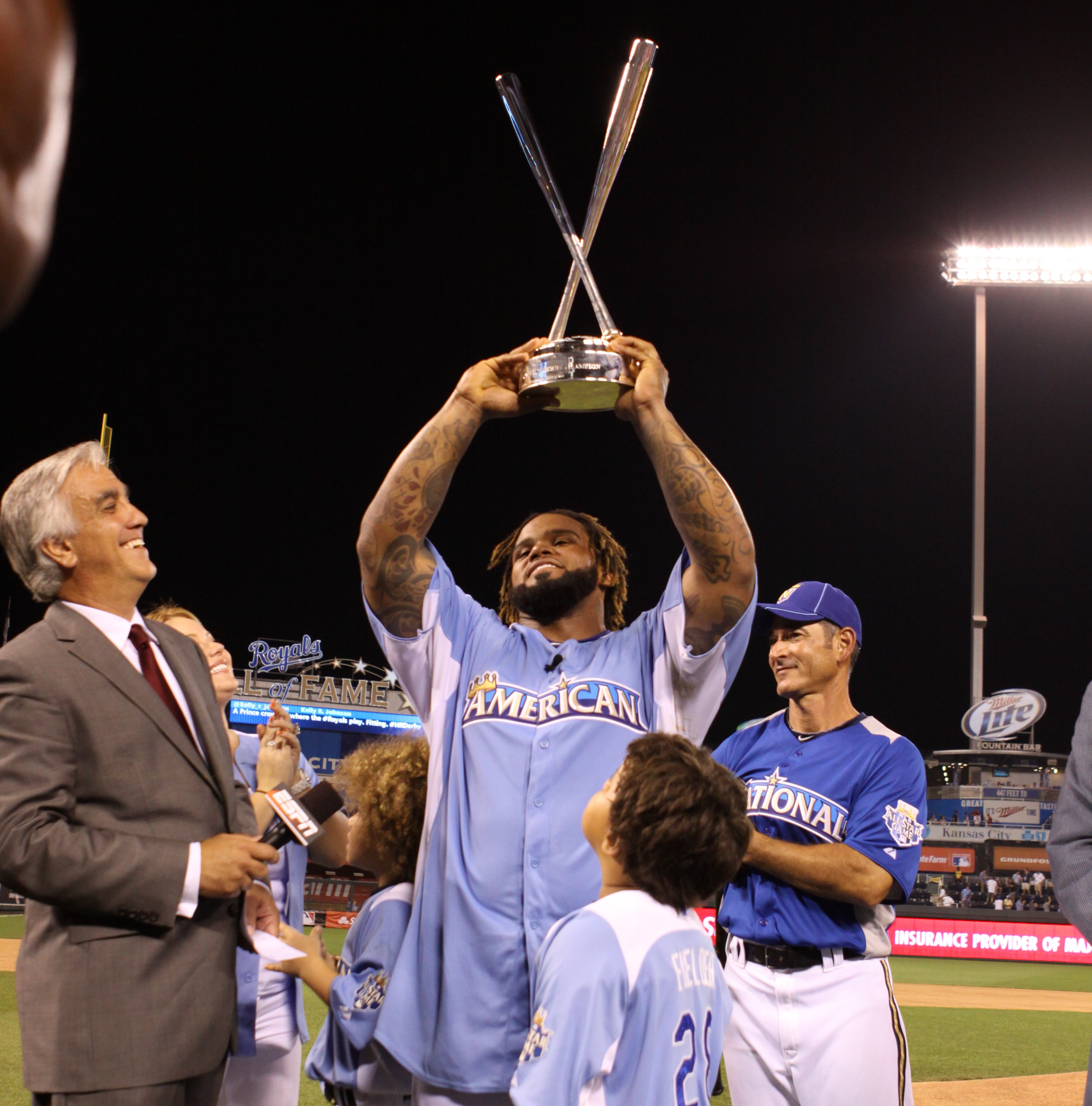
Prince Fielder celebrating his win with his family

Kauffman Stadium, Kansas City—A.L. 61, N.L. 21
Player	Team	Round 1	Round 2	Subtotal	Finals	Total
Prince Fielder	Tigers	5	11	16	12	28
José Bautista	Blue Jays	11	2	13 (2)	7	20
Mark Trumbo	Angels	7	6	13 (1)	—	13
Carlos Beltrán	Cardinals	7	5	12	—	12
Carlos Gonzalez	Rockies	4	—	4	—	4
Andrew McCutchen	Pirates	4	—	4	—	4
Matt Kemp	Dodgers	1	—	1	—	1
Robinson Canó	Yankees	0	—	0	—	0

Note: Italicized numbers denote swing-offs.

== Robinson Canó booing controversy ==
Yankees' second baseman Robinson Canó was at the center of a controversy involving booing from the live Kauffman Stadium fans. Canó was the American League's captain for the Home Run Derby and was responsible for picking the other participants. In June, Canó said that the right thing to do would be to choose a player from the hosting Kansas City Royals. However, he ultimately picked Prince Fielder, José Bautista, and Mark Trumbo (who finished in first, second, and third place respectively) as the AL representatives, leaving out Billy Butler of the Royals. The fans in attendance at the Derby expressed their displeasure at the snub, and heavily jeered Canó with booing during his performance at the derby. Canó did not hit a single home run during the derby and finished in last place. Later, Canó claimed that Kansas City fans targeted his family during their jeers at the All-Star festivities.
