= 2010 Major League Baseball Home Run Derby =

Baseball competition

- Date: July 12, 2010
- Venue: Angel Stadium of Anaheim
- City: Anaheim, California
- Winner: David Ortiz

The 2010 Major League Baseball Home Run Derby (known through sponsorship as the State Farm Home Run Derby) was a home run hitting contest in Major League Baseball (MLB) between four batters each from the American League and National League. The derby was held on July 12, 2010, at the site of the 2010 MLB All-Star Game, Angel Stadium of Anaheim in Anaheim, California. The event was broadcast live on ESPN, ESPN 3D, and ESPN Deportes. It was also broadcast internationally on Rogers SportsNet in Canada, and ESPN America in Europe. David Ortiz of the Boston Red Sox won the event.

== Results ==
Angel Stadium of Anaheim, Anaheim—A.L. 50, N.L. 45
| Player | Team | Round 1 | Round 2 | Subtotal | Finals | Total |
|---|---|---|---|---|---|---|
| David Ortiz | Red Sox | 8 | 13 | 21 | 11 | 32 |
| Hanley Ramírez | Marlins | 9 | 12 | 21 | 5 | 26 |
| Corey Hart | Brewers | 13 | 0 | 13 | – | 13 |
| Miguel Cabrera | Tigers | 7 | 5 | 12 | – | 12 |
| Matt Holliday | Cardinals | 5 | – | 5 | – | 5 |
| Nick Swisher | Yankees | 4 | – | 4 | – | 4 |
| Vernon Wells | Blue Jays | 2 | – | 2 | – | 2 |
| Chris Young | Diamondbacks | 1 | – | 1 | – | 1 |

italics – Hall of Famer

== Rules ==
Each participant is thrown pitches by a pitcher of his choice. The hitter has the option of not swinging at a pitch. If he swings at a pitch and misses or hits the pitch anywhere but in home run territory, it is considered an out. Each player hits until he receives 10 outs in each round. When nine outs are reached in each round, a "gold money ball" comes into play.

In the first two rounds, home run totals will carry over for those rounds. Should there be a tie after either of the first two rounds, a "Swing-Off" takes place. In a Swing-Off, each tied player gets five swings to get as many home runs as possible, plus extra swings if needed. Home runs hit during a first round Swing-Off do not count towards the player's total going into the second round. All eight players participate in the first round; the four highest totals from round one will move to the semi-finals. The top two totals will face off in the finals, with the scores deleted from the first two rounds.

== Charity ==
State Farm donated US$3,000 for every non-"gold ball" home run and $17,000 for each gold ball homer to the Boys and Girls Clubs of America. In addition, a child from certain a Boys and Girls Club was assigned to each of the eight players with the child assigned to the winner receiving a $50,000 donation from State Farm and the other seven getting $10,000 for their club. In all, a total of $523,000 was donated.

MasterCard would have donated $1,000,000 to Stand Up To Cancer if a player had hit one of two designated banners. The banners remained up for the All-Star Game.
