= Vernon Wells (baseball) =

American baseball player (born 1978)

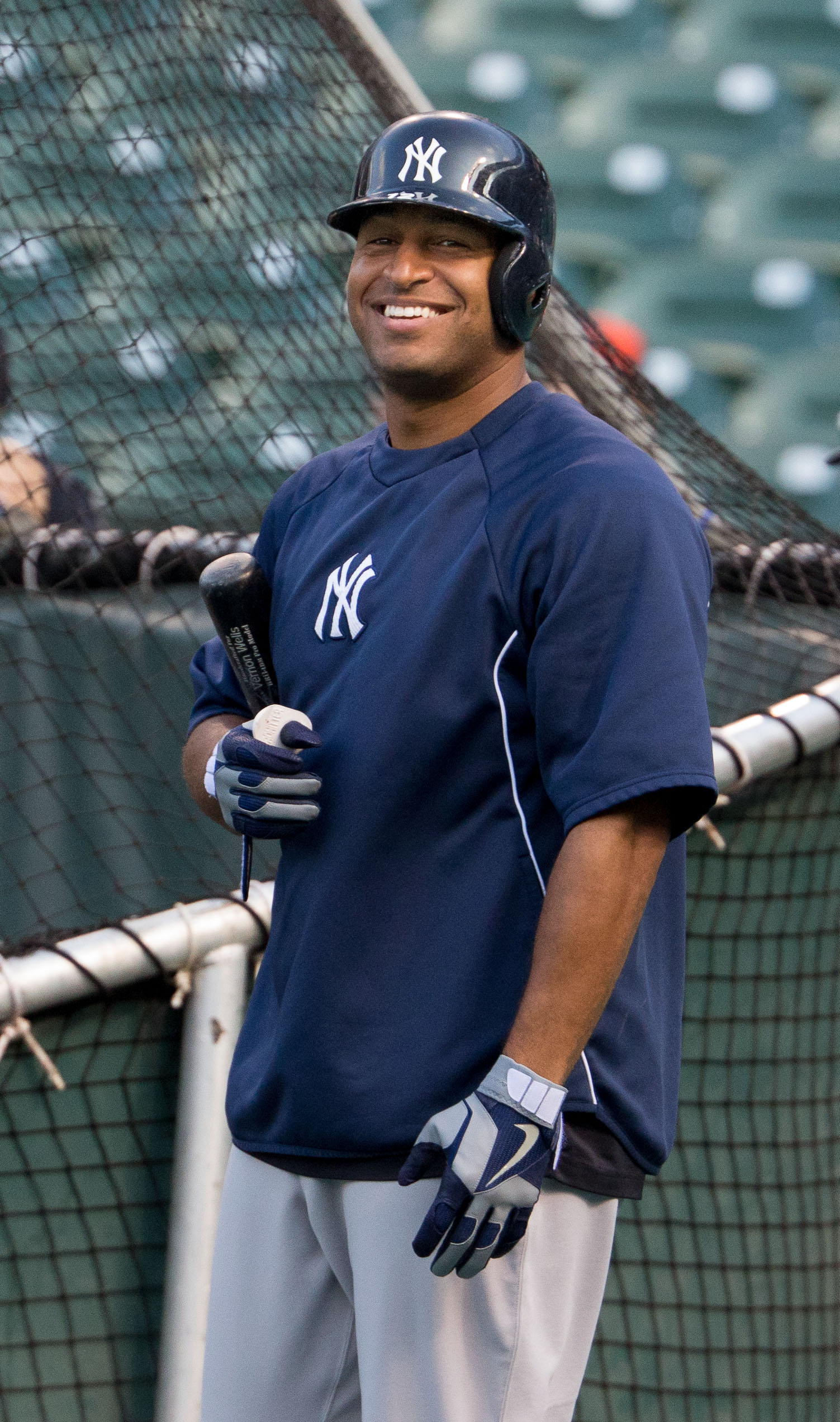
- Wells with the New York Yankees in 2013
- Center fielder
- Born: December 8, 1978 (age 47); Shreveport, Louisiana, U.S.
- Batted: Right Threw: Right

MLB debut
- August 30, 1999, for the Toronto Blue Jays

Last MLB appearance
- September 29, 2013, for the New York Yankees

MLB statistics
- Batting average: .270
- Home runs: 270
- Runs batted in: 958
- Stats at Baseball Reference

Teams
- Toronto Blue Jays (1999–2010); Los Angeles Angels of Anaheim (2011–2012); New York Yankees (2013)

Career highlights and awards
- 3× All-Star (2003, 2006, 2010); 3× Gold Glove Award (2004–2006); Silver Slugger Award (2003)

Vernon Wells III (born December 8, 1978) is an American former professional baseball center fielder. He played in Major League Baseball (MLB) for the Toronto Blue Jays, the Los Angeles Angels of Anaheim, and the New York Yankees.

Wells has appeared on three All-Star teams in his career, been awarded three Gold Glove Awards, and one Silver Slugger Award. He is second all-time for the Blue Jays in career hits, doubles, runs, RBI and total bases, and fourth in home runs, behind Carlos Delgado, José Bautista, and Edwin Encarnación.

== Early years ==
Wells was born in Shreveport, Louisiana, to Vernon Wells Jr. and grew up in Arlington, Texas, where his family moved in 1988. His father played in the Canadian Football League and is an accomplished painter. In 1993, Wells entered Arlington's Bowie High School where he played quarterback on the football team and was an outfielder on the baseball team. In his senior year, he batted .565 with seven home runs and 20 runs batted in (RBI). Before entering the Major League Baseball draft, Wells signed a letter of intent to attend the University of Texas at Austin to play baseball and football (as a wide receiver).

== Early career ==
The Toronto Blue Jays made Wells the fifth pick overall in the 1997 MLB draft out of Bowie High School. He spent several years as a top prospect in the Blue Jays organization, starting with the St. Catharines Stompers, Toronto's Class-A team in the short-season New York–Penn League. In 1998, he played for the Hagerstown Suns and was selected as the Utility Outfielder on the South Atlantic League End of Season All-Star Team. In 1999, he played in the Australian Baseball League with the Sydney Storm. From 1999 through 2001, Wells was a regular September call-up and played in 57 major league games.

== Major League career ==
=== Toronto Blue Jays (1999–2010) ===
In 2002, Wells was given his first chance to be an everyday player. Although disqualified from Rookie of the Year contention because he had exceeded the 130 career at-bat limit to qualify as a rookie (the award went to teammate Eric Hinske), Wells proved himself to be one of the game's rising stars. He batted .275 with 23 home runs, 100 RBI and 87 runs while becoming one of the best defensive center fielders in the game.

In 2003, Wells' finished the season with a .317 batting average, 33 home runs, 117 RBI and 118 runs. He led the league with 215 hits, 49 doubles, and 373 total bases and finished eighth in American League MVP voting. He also participated in his first All-Star game. He won the AL co-player of the week for the first time on June 23, 2003, sharing the honor with Corey Koskie. Wells won his first Gold Glove Award in 2004, and a second in 2005.

Wells began the 2006 season on a torrid pace, and continued to hit well throughout the year, ending the season with a .303 batting average, 32 home runs, and 106 runs batted in. Wells' year was capped by a game against the Boston Red Sox on May 30 in which he hit three home runs, with two coming off of Red Sox starter Josh Beckett. He won the AL player of the week honor on July 24. Wells was selected as a reserve outfielder on the American League All-Star Team and was promoted to the League's starting lineup after an injury to Boston's Manny Ramírez. It was his second appearance in the mid-summer classic.

During the season, Blue Jays general manager J.P. Ricciardi criticized Wells, as well as teammates Troy Glaus and Shea Hillenbrand, for failure to perform during key situations after two losses to the Kansas City Royals just before the 2006 All-Star break. He followed such criticisms with great play throughout the rest of the year, including a walk-off home run against New York Yankees closer Mariano Rivera. On September 24, he recorded his 500th RBI in a game against the Boston Red Sox. At the end of the 2006 season, Wells was awarded his third consecutive Gold Glove Award for outfield defense, along with Torii Hunter, and Ichiro Suzuki. On December 15, 2006, Wells signed a back-loaded contract extension for $126 million over seven years with the Blue Jays.

Wells suffered a shoulder injury early in the 2007 season, and had season-ending shoulder surgery in September. He finished the season batting just .245 with 16 home runs and 80 RBI in 149 games.

On May 9, 2008, Wells suffered a broken left wrist while making a diving catch against the Cleveland Indians and was placed on the disabled list the next day. He returned on June 7, but later strained his left hamstring on July 9 and missed over a month of the season. Despite the significant amount of time missed to injury, 2008 otherwise represented a return to form for Wells as he finished the year hitting .300 with 20 home runs and 78 RBI in just 108 games.

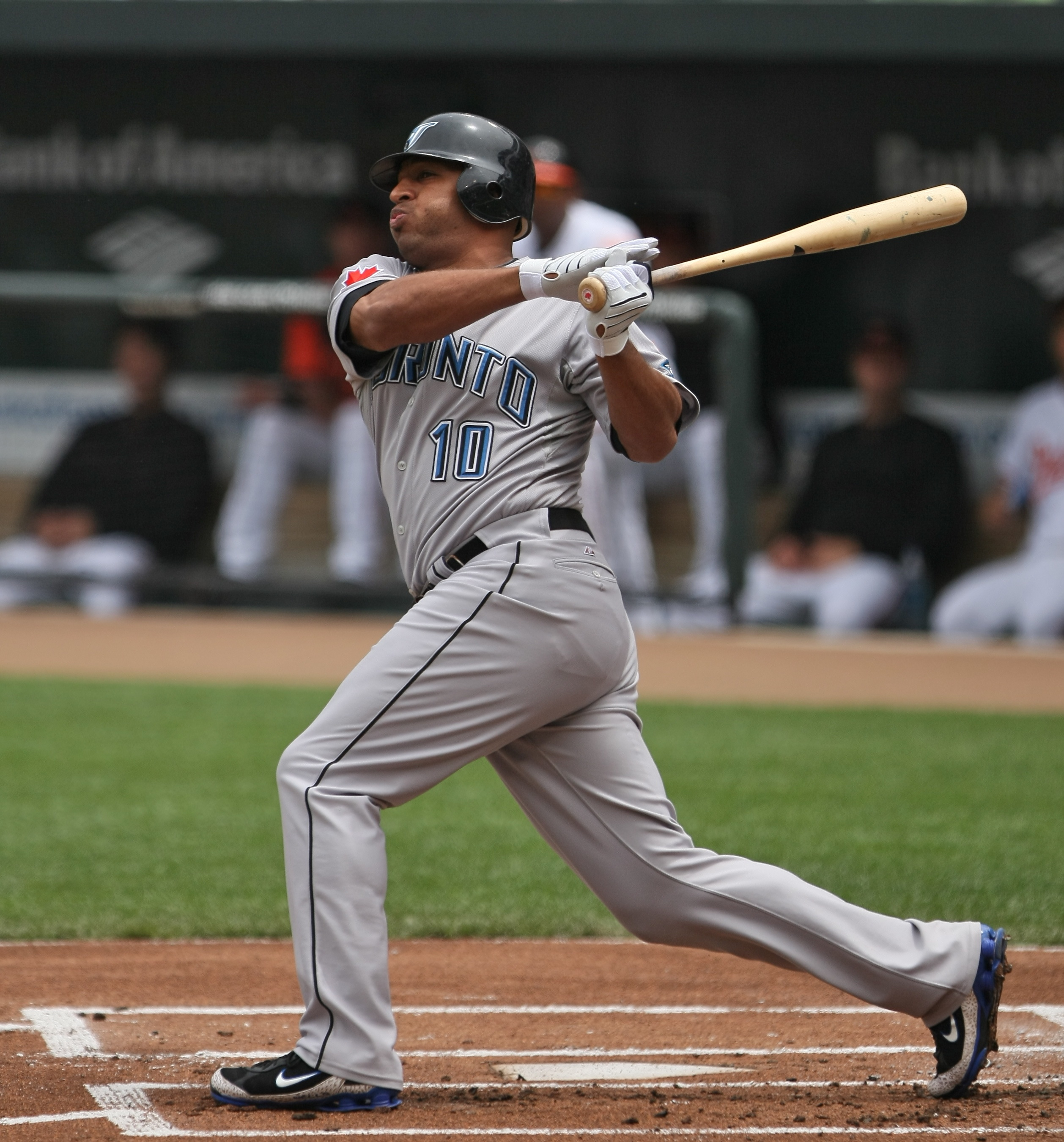
Wells batting for the Toronto Blue Jays in 2009

During spring training in 2009, Wells suffered another injury, a strained left hamstring which kept him out for several weeks. At the beginning of the season, Wells batted fourth in the lineup and was playing center field. He struggled with consistency at the plate, and was subsequently dropped from the fourth spot in the lineup before the All-Star break. Though he stole 17 bases, Wells finished the year with some of the worst numbers of his career, batting .260 with only 15 home runs and 66 RBI and finishing with an OPS near .700. During the season, he received significant criticism from the press regarding his large contract.

Wells began 2010 at a promising pace, hitting four home runs with eight RBI in the first series. He continued to play well, hitting .337 with eight home runs and 16 RBI in April. On April 7, he had a multi-home run game against the Rangers, his first since September 28, 2008. On June 27, Wells hit a two-run home run that made Jamie Moyer of the Philadelphia Phillies, Major League Baseball's all-time leader in home runs allowed, with 506. On July 5, 2010, Wells was named a reserve for the 2010 MLB All-Star Game, along with teammates José Bautista and John Buck. Wells was also a participant in the Home Run Derby, when Chris Berman predicted that Wells, whom he nicknamed the "Canadian Breeze", would carry away the title. Wells ended up hitting two home runs in the first round.

On September 24, 2010, Wells hit his 30th home run of the season. That home run made Wells only the fourth player in Blue Jays history to have three or more seasons with at least 30 home runs, joining Carlos Delgado, Joe Carter and Fred McGriff. At the end of the season, Wells had 31 home runs, 88 RBI, and an .847 OPS, making the 2010 season his best since he signed his contract extension in 2006. He finished the year batting .273 with 161 hits in 590 at bats, giving him over 1,500 hits in his career.

Also in 2010, Wells was selected to receive the Branch Rickey Award for humanitarian works by the Rotary Club of Denver. He is the second member of the Blue Jays to receive this honor; Dave Winfield was the 1992 recipient. The award was presented on November 13, 2010, and Wells was then inducted into the Baseball Humanitarians Hall of Fame.

=== Los Angeles Angels of Anaheim (2011–2012) ===
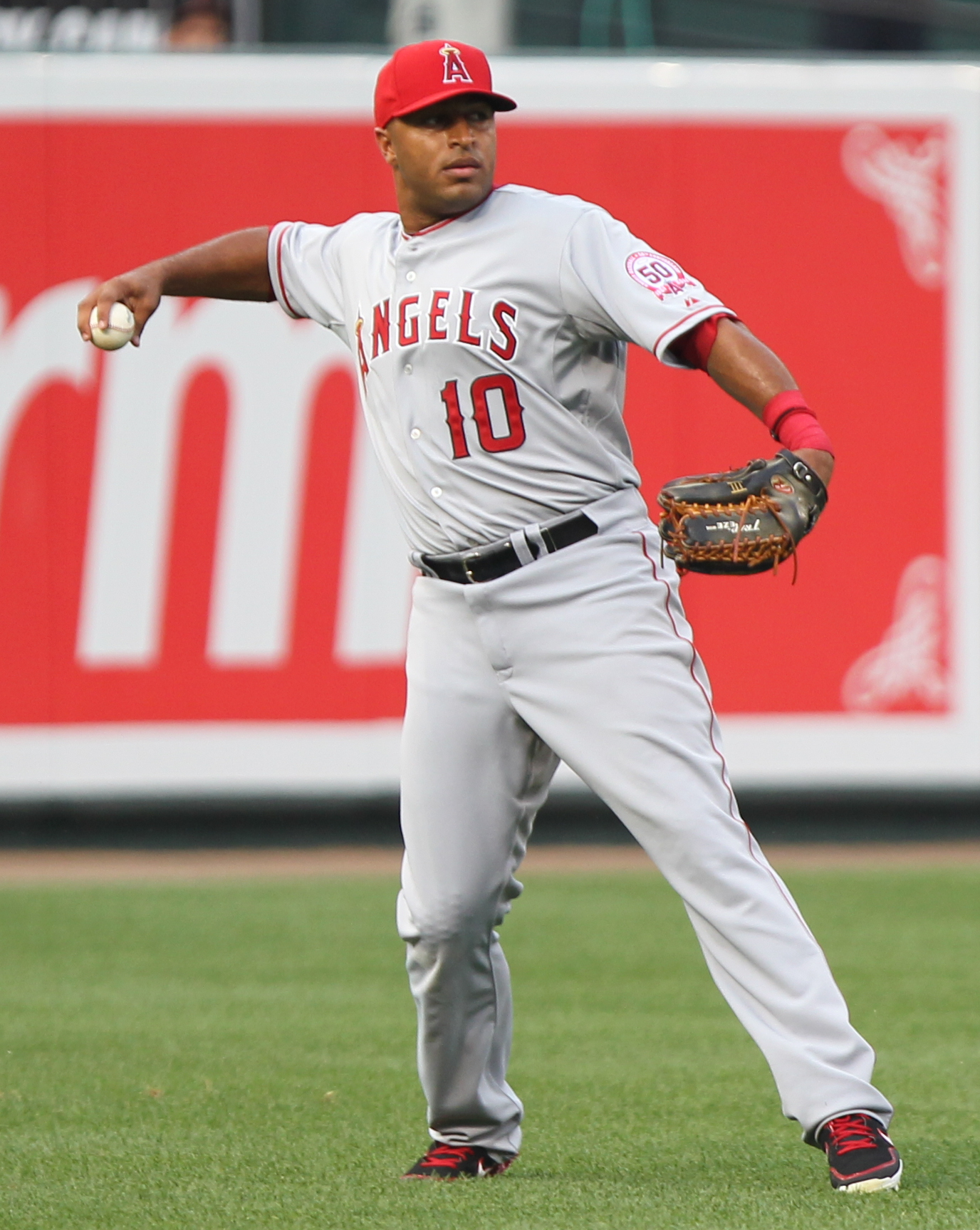
Wells playing for the Los Angeles Angels in 2011

On January 21, 2011, Wells was traded to the Los Angeles Angels of Anaheim, in exchange for catcher Mike Napoli and outfielder Juan Rivera. Blue Jays general manager Alex Anthopoulos managed the trade despite $90 million remaining on Wells’ deal, since the Angels were desperate for an outfielder. After Wells' departure, Anthopoulos has since instituted a “five year policy” on player contracts, while also excluding performance bonuses, incentives, player options, no-trade clauses or opt-out clauses, in making these deals much more team friendly.

Wells started out the season hitting below the Mendoza Line through the first month and a half of the 2011 season. At the All-Star break, his batting average improved to .222. Wells "heated up" during the months of June and July, hitting 11 home runs combined in those months, after hitting only four in the previous two. In his first game back in Toronto on August 12, Wells received a standing ovation before his first at bat, and followed that up by taking the first pitch of the at bat thrown by Brandon Morrow over the left-center field fence. In 2011, he batted .218, the lowest batting average of all major league ballplayers with 512 or more plate appearances, and also had the lowest on-base percentage (.248).

=== New York Yankees (2013) ===
On March 26, 2013, the Angels traded Wells to the New York Yankees for minor leaguers Exicardo Cayones and Kramer Sneed. The Yankees paid $13.9 million of the $42 million remaining on his contract. Wells switched to number 12 as number 10 is retired by the Yankees for Phil Rizzuto. On May 8, 2013, Wells played third base for the first time in his career. He then played second base for the first time on May 15. On July 26, Wells changed his uniform number from 12 to 22 to give to Alfonso Soriano, who had been reacquired from the Chicago Cubs. On August 5, 2013, Wells made his first start and appearance at first base.

On January 10, 2014, Wells was designated for assignment by the Yankees and later released on January 16. In 130 games for the Yankees in 2013, Wells hit .233 with 11 home runs and 50 RBI.

Wells was eligible to be elected into the Hall of Fame in 2019, but received less than 5% of the vote and became ineligible for the 2020 ballot.

=== Career statistics ===
In 1731 games over 15 years, Wells posted a .270 batting average (1794-for-6642) with 930 runs, 379 doubles, 34 triples, 270 home runs, 958 RBI, 109 stolen bases, 472 bases on balls, .319 on-base percentage and .459 slugging percentage. He finished his career with a .993 fielding percentage playing primarily at center and left field. Wells has the most career homers of anyone whose career batting average "matches" their home run total (.270 BA, 270 HR).

== Personal life ==
Wells' father, Vernon Wells Jr. is an acclaimed sports artist and was an early contributor to Upper Deck baseball cards with his art frequently appearing on team checklists and Baseball Heroes subsets featuring Reggie Jackson and other players.

Wells currently resides in Westlake, Texas, near his hometown of Arlington. In 2001, he married his high school sweetheart, Charlene Valenti. He has two sons, Christian Wells age 11 and 14 as of May 2016.

== Off the field activities ==
- During the 2006 post-season, Wells was an analyst for ESPN's Baseball Tonight show.
- Beginning in 2002, Wells acted as the Honorary Commissioner of the Toronto Rookie League, a Greater Toronto Area baseball league run for underprivileged children who live in Toronto Community Housing.
- Wells co-founded JACK Winery in Napa Valley, California in 2012.
- Wells served as a coach for the National League team in the 2024 All-Star Futures Game.

== See also ==
- List of Major League Baseball career home run leaders
- List of Major League Baseball annual doubles leaders
