= 2007 Major League Baseball Home Run Derby =

Baseball competition

- Date: July 9, 2007
- Venue: AT&T Park
- City: San Francisco, California
- Winner: Vladimir Guerrero

The 2007 State Farm Home Run Derby was a 2007 Major League Baseball All-Star Game event. The Home Run Derby was held on July 9 at AT&T Park, the home field of the San Francisco Giants. As usual, the competition had eight competitors, seven of whom were eliminated over three rounds. The Home Run Derby was seen July 9 on ESPN at 8 p.m. EST.

Vladimir Guerrero of the Los Angeles Angels of Anaheim beat Alex Ríos of the Toronto Blue Jays 3–2 in the final. Sixteen years later, Guerrero's son Vladimir Guerrero Jr. would go on to win the 2023 contest making them the only father-son tandem to win the MLB Home Run Derby.

== Competitors ==
The eight competitors were 2006 winner Ryan Howard of the Philadelphia Phillies, Justin Morneau of the Minnesota Twins, Prince Fielder of the Milwaukee Brewers, Vladimir Guerrero of the Los Angeles Angels, Magglio Ordóñez of the Detroit Tigers, Albert Pujols of the St. Louis Cardinals (who last participated in 2003), Alex Ríos of the Toronto Blue Jays and Matt Holliday of the Colorado Rockies, who replaced the Florida Marlins' Miguel Cabrera, who was injured in a game on July 7 after being announced as a participant.

== Rules ==
Any ball that is swung at by the batter must be hit over the outfield fence in fair territory to be ruled a home run. A swing and a miss is an out, but if the batter doesn't swing, no out is recorded. In the event of a tie, a swing-off will be held. The contestant with the most home runs in five swings advances. If there is still a tie after five swings, each contestant will be given three swings to break the tie.

=== Round One ===
Each contestant gets ten outs. The top four home run hitters advance on to the next round.

=== Round Two ===
Totals from the first round carry over. Each batter again receives ten outs. The top two advance to the final round.

=== Round Three ===
Home run totals do not carry over for this round. As in the first two rounds, both hitters have ten outs. The competitor who has the most home runs at the end of the round is the winner.

== Competition ==
AT&T Park, San Francisco—A.L. 42, N.L. 32
Player	Team	Round 1	Round 2	Subtotal	Finals	Total
Vladimir Guerrero	Los Angeles (AL)	5	9	14	3 ^{a}	17
Alex Ríos	Toronto	5	12	17	2	19
Matt Holliday	Colorado	5	8	13	–	13
Albert Pujols	St. Louis	4 ^{b}	9	13	–	13
Justin Morneau	Minnesota	4	–	4	–	4
Prince Fielder	Milwaukee	3	–	3	–	3
Ryan Howard	Philadelphia	3	–	3	–	3
Magglio Ordóñez	Detroit	2	–	2	–	2

italics – Hall of Famer

^aRecorded only seven of ten outs before hitting winning home run.
^bAdvanced after defeating Morneau 2-1 in a swing-off.

== Resources ==
- Derby picks up star power
- Guerrero, Ordonez join Derby field
- mlb.com's 2007 State Farm Home Run Derby page
- Pujols and Rios In
