= 2021 Major League Baseball Home Run Derby =

Baseball competition

- Date: July 12, 2021
- Venue: Coors Field
- City: Denver, Colorado
- Winner: Pete Alonso
- Score: 23–22

The 2021 Major League Baseball Home Run Derby was a home run hitting contest between eight batters from Major League Baseball (MLB). The derby was held on July 12, 2021, at Coors Field in Denver, Colorado, the site of the 2021 MLB All-Star Game.

The longest home run, among the total 309 hit by the eight players involved, covered a distance of 520 ft (158.50 m), and was hit by Juan Soto. This broke the record of longest home run hit in the derby, surpassing Aaron Judge's 513 ft (156.36 m) home run from 2017.

This was the second derby since the format change in 2015 to feature tie-breaking rounds, as Juan Soto and Shohei Ohtani went to a swing-off in the first round. Winner Pete Alonso of the New York Mets tied his own record for most home runs hit in the final round with 23. He also broke the record for most home runs hit in the first round with 35, surpassing Vladimir Guerrero Jr.'s total of 29 from 2019. With the win, Alonso become the fourth player in history to win multiple derbies and the third to win back-to-back derbies (the 2020 Home Run Derby was cancelled due to the COVID-19 pandemic).

== Rules ==
The bracket is a single-elimination bracket with three rounds total. The higher seed in each matchup always hits second.

The contestants have three minutes in the first and second rounds and two minutes in the final round to hit as many home runs as possible. The timer begins with the release of the first pitch, and the round ends when the timer hits zero. A home run will count if the timer hits zero, so long as the pitch was released beforehand. If the second contestant in the matchup exceeds their opponents home run total, the round ends.

Each contestant receives 30 seconds of bonus time after the regulation time expires. Additionally, the contestants can receive an additional 30 seconds of bonus time if they hit at least one home run that equals or exceeds 475 ft (144.78 m) during regulation. Each contestant is entitled to one 45-second timeout in each regulation period. Timeouts cannot be called during bonus time.

Ties in any round are broken by a 60-second tiebreaker with no bonus time or timeouts. If a tie remains, the contestants will engage in successive three-swing swing-offs until there is a winner.

As with 2019, the prize pool for the contestants totals $2.5 million, with the winner receiving $1 million of that total.

== Bracket ==
Washington Nationals outfielder Juan Soto, Colorado Rockies shortstop Trevor Story, Baltimore Orioles first baseman Trey Mancini, New York Mets first baseman Pete Alonso, Kansas City Royals catcher Salvador Pérez, Oakland Athletics first baseman Matt Olson, Texas Rangers outfielder Joey Gallo and Los Angeles Angels two-way player Shohei Ohtani had been selected to participate in the derby. Alonso set a new first round record with 35 home runs in the first round. Ohtani and Soto went to a swing-off in the first round after tying with six home runs in the tie breaker. Soto prevailed by a score of 3-0 after Ohtani failed to hit a home run with his first swing.

Quarterfinals
1	Shohei Ohtani (LAA)	28
8	Juan Soto (WSH)	31*
4	Salvador Pérez (KC)	28
5	Pete Alonso (NYM)	35
3	Matt Olson (OAK)	23
6	Trey Mancini (BAL)	24
2	Joey Gallo (TEX)	19
7	Trevor Story (COL)	20

Semifinals
8	Juan Soto	15
5	Pete Alonso	16
6	Trey Mancini	13
7	Trevor Story	12

Finals
5	Pete Alonso	23
6	Trey Mancini	22

* Round went into a swing-off after Ohtani and Soto were tied 22–22 after regulation and 28–28 after first tiebreaker.
