= 2005 Major League Baseball Home Run Derby =

Baseball competition

- Date: July 11, 2005
- Venue: Comerica Park
- City: Detroit, Michigan
- Winner: Bobby Abreu

The 2005 Century 21 Home Run Derby was a 2005 Major League Baseball All-Star Game event held at Comerica Park, the home field of the Detroit Tigers on July 11, 2005. The competition had eight competitors as usual and seven were eliminated over the course of three rounds. In honor of the inaugural World Baseball Classic, all the competitors represented their home countries, each representing a different country. Bobby Abreu won the derby with 41 home runs over the three rounds, a record at the time.

== Musical guest ==
The event opened with a performance by Alter Bridge, performing a cover of "Detroit Rock City" followed by "Open Your Eyes." On the latter song, the band was joined by Johnny Damon and Mike Piazza.

== Competitors ==
The eight competitors were Venezuela's Bobby Abreu of the Philadelphia Phillies, Canada's Jason Bay of the Pittsburgh Pirates, South Korea's Hee-seop Choi of the Los Angeles Dodgers, the Netherlands' Andruw Jones of the Atlanta Braves, Panama's Carlos Lee of the Milwaukee Brewers, the Dominican Republic's David Ortiz of the Boston Red Sox, Puerto Rico's Iván Rodríguez of the Detroit Tigers, and the United States' Mark Teixeira of the Texas Rangers.

== Rules ==
Any ball that is swung at must be hit over the outfield wall in fair territory to be counted as a home run. A swing and a miss is an out, but if the batter doesn't swing, no out is recorded. If there is a tie, a swing off will be held. The contestant with the most home runs gets five swings, but if there is still a tie after five swings, each contestant will be given three swings to break the tie.

=== Round One ===
Each contestant receives ten outs. The top four home run hitters of the round advance to the next round.

=== Round Two ===
Each batter again receives ten outs. The top two hitters of the round advance to the final round.

=== Round Three ===
The two batters once again receive ten outs. The contestant with the most home runs in the round wins the derby.

== Competition ==
Comerica Park, Detroit—A.L. 42, N.L. 61
| Player | Team | Country | Round 1 | Round 2 | Finals | Total |
|---|---|---|---|---|---|---|
| Bobby Abreu | Phillies | Venezuela | 24 | 6 | 11 | 41 |
| Iván Rodríguez | Tigers | Puerto Rico | 7 | 8 | 5 | 20 |
| Carlos Lee | Brewers | Panama | 11 | 4 | – | 15 |
| David Ortiz | Red Sox | Dominican Republic | 17 | 3 | – | 20 |
| Hee-seop Choi | Dodgers | South Korea | 5 | – | – | 5 |
| Andruw Jones | Braves | Netherlands | 5 | – | – | 5 |
| Mark Teixeira | Rangers | United States | 2 | – | – | 2 |
| Jason Bay | Pirates | Canada | 0 | – | – | 0 |

italics – Hall of Famer
