= Justin Bour =

American baseball player (born 1988)

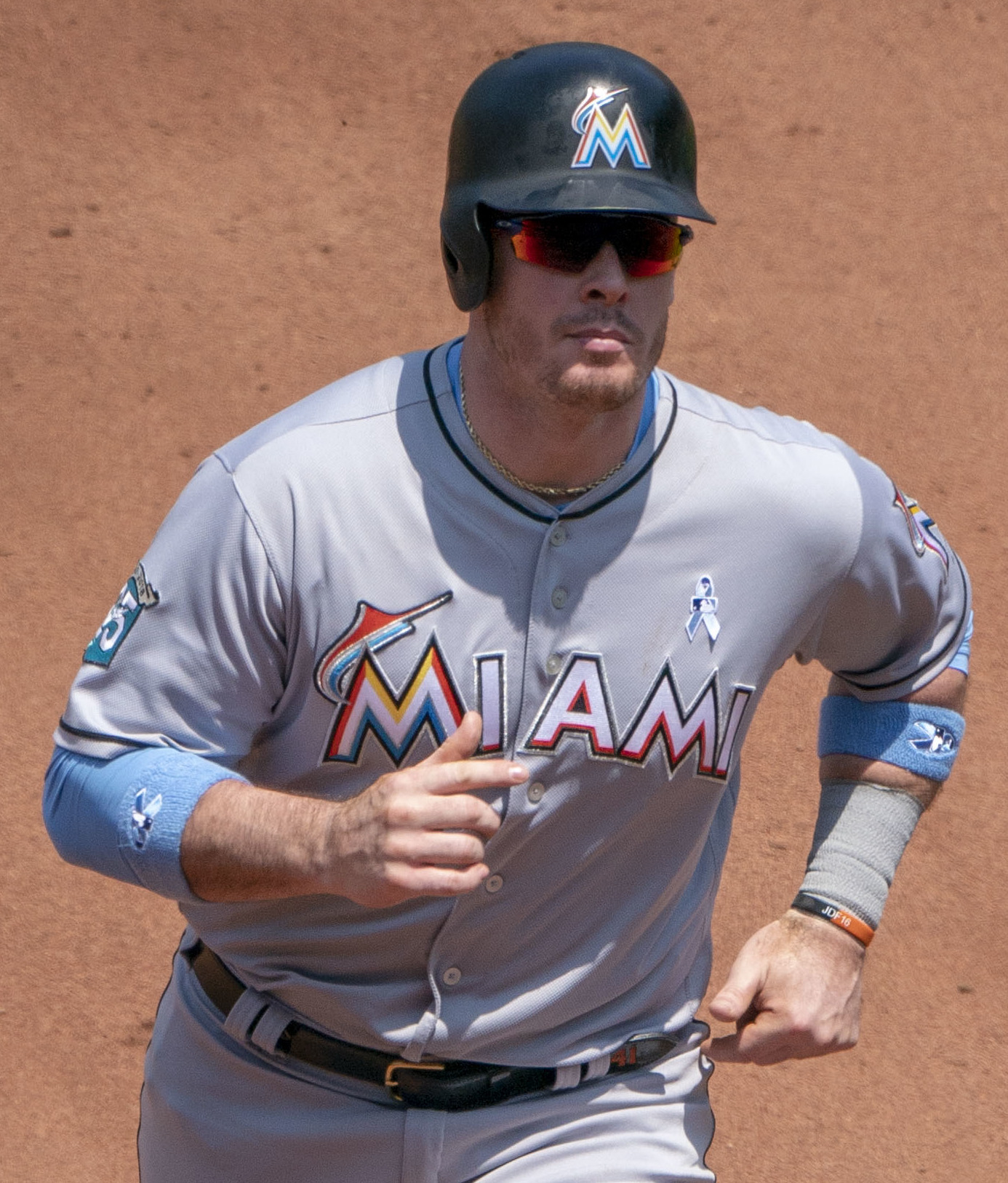
- Bour with the Miami Marlins in 2018
- First baseman
- Born: May 28, 1988 (age 38); Washington, D.C., U.S.
- Batted: Left Threw: Right

Professional debut
- MLB: June 5, 2014, for the Miami Marlins
- NPB: June 19, 2020, for the Hanshin Tigers
- KBO: August 10, 2021, for the LG Twins

Last appearance
- MLB: September 29, 2019, for the Los Angeles Angels
- NPB: October 21, 2020, for the Hanshin Tigers
- KBO: September 21, 2021, for the LG Twins

MLB statistics
- Batting average: .253
- Home runs: 92
- Runs batted in: 303

NPB statistics
- Batting average: .243
- Home runs: 17
- Runs batted in: 45

KBO statistics
- Batting average: .170
- Home runs: 3
- Runs batted in: 17
- Stats at Baseball Reference

Teams
- Miami Marlins (2014–2018); Philadelphia Phillies (2018); Los Angeles Angels (2019); Hanshin Tigers (2020); LG Twins (2021)

Justin James Bour (born May 28, 1988) is an American former professional baseball first baseman. He played in Major League Baseball (MLB) for the Miami Marlins, Philadelphia Phillies, and Los Angeles Angels, in Nippon Professional Baseball (NPB) for the Hanshin Tigers, and in the KBO League for the LG Twins.

== Early life ==
Bour was born in Washington, D.C. to Jim and Tracey Bour. His father was employed by the Secret Service and was mainly assigned to presidential detail. He also has two siblings, Jason and Jenna Bour.

While living in Chantilly, Virginia, Bour attended Westfield High School. He helped lead the team to a division title. During high school, Bour pitched and played first base. In high school, he earned first-team All-Met honors. He earned this title in 2006 after being named Honorable Mention All-Met selection his junior year in 2005. During the same year, Bour was named first team All-Met his high school won their division title. In his senior year, Bour batted .523 with 23 runs batted in (RBIs).

== College career ==
Bour attended George Mason University in Fairfax, Virginia. Bour's father, mother, and older brother also attended the university. Bour's father played volleyball, his mother played softball and volleyball, and his brother, Jason, played baseball.

While attending George Mason University Justin Bour also created his own legacy. He had 1,273 putouts which placed him first in the category, tied for second in career home runs with 46, third in RBIs with 187, fourth in total bases with 404, fifth in fielding percentage with .986, sixth in slugging percentage with .621, and 11th in batting average .347. During his three years at George Mason University, Bour averaged 15 home runs and 62 runs batted with an OPS better than .901. He set a school record on March 6, 2007, when he hit two grand slams and had nine RBIs in a 28–1 victory over Coppin State. In 2008, he played collegiate summer baseball with the Bourne Braves of the Cape Cod Baseball League.

These record numbers led to Bour being drafted in the 2009 Major League Amateur Draft by the Chicago Cubs in the 25th round, even though he was thought to be a mid-round selection. Since 1978, 52 players have been signed or drafted in the baseball program at George Mason. Bour still practices there in the off season.

== Professional career ==
=== Chicago Cubs ===
Bour made his way through the Cubs minor league organization, peaking in 2012 with the Double-A Tennessee Smokies. Bour batted .283/.360/.455 and drove in 110 runs. He was named to the Southern League Postseason All-Star team. In the second half of the following season Bour hit 16 home runs with the Smokies but was blocked on the roster for first base by Anthony Rizzo. Bour was drafted by the Marlins in the Rule 5 draft in December 2013.

=== Miami Marlins ===
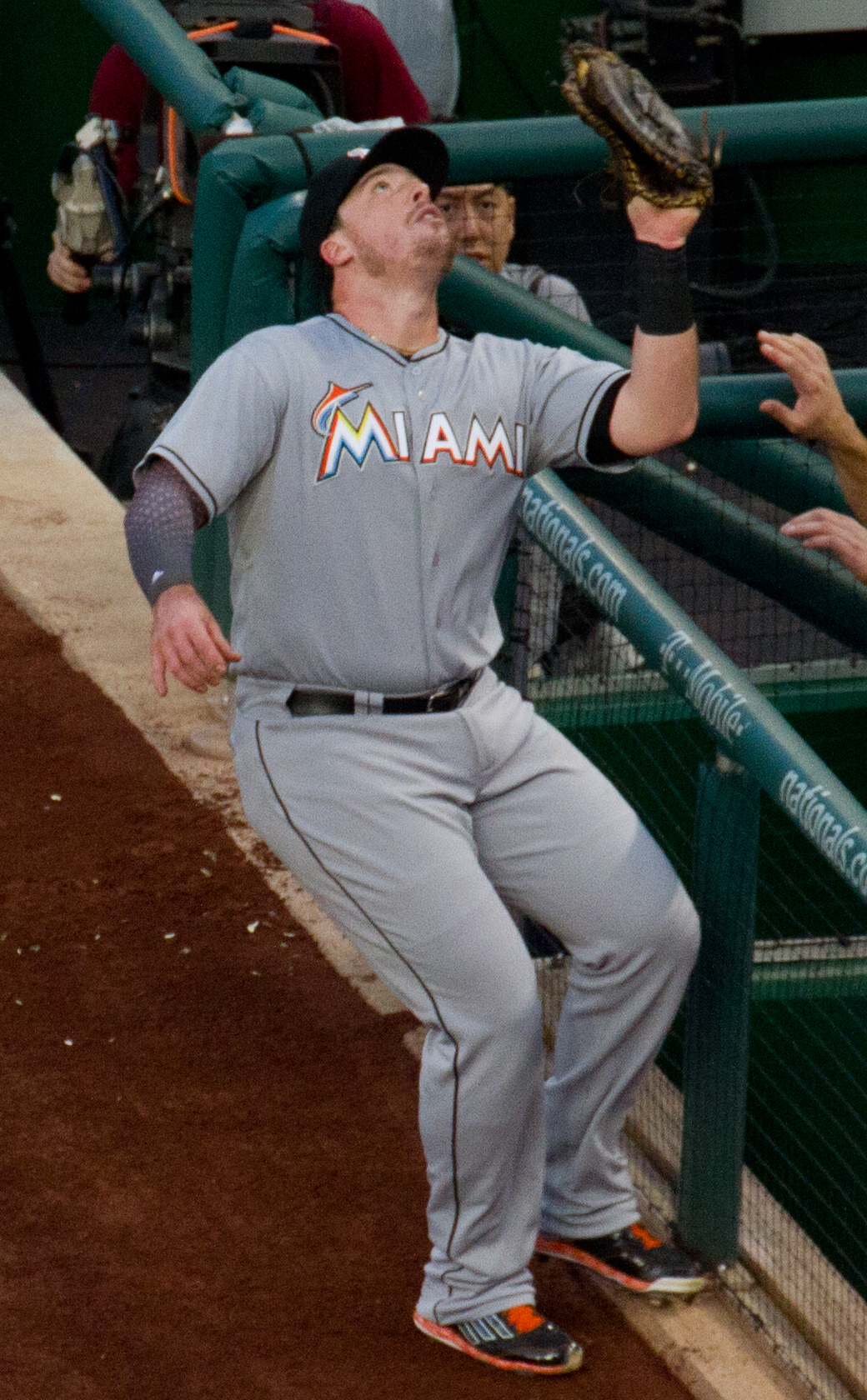
Bour with the Marlins in 2015

Bour was first called up to the majors with the Marlins on June 1, 2014. Bour spent a majority of the 2015 season with the Marlins after proving himself with the Marlins in 2014. Bour did extremely well with the Marlins in 2015. On May 17, 2015, Bour made headlines for breaking up Shelby Miller’s no hit bid at Marlins Park with two outs in the bottom of the ninth inning. He also homered in four straight games June 30 – July 3, 2015. He became the eighth Marlin in franchise history to accomplish this. In October Bour was named the National League Rookie of the Month for September. After the All-Star break Bour hit 13 home runs and drove in 46 runs. This production helped offset the power hitting that the Marlins lost after a hamate injury sustained by Giancarlo Stanton in June. Bour led the Marlins in RBIs that season with 73 and had 23 homers which placed him second behind Stanton for the season. Bour batted .262/.321/.479 for the season and finished 5th in the National League Rookie of the Year voting.

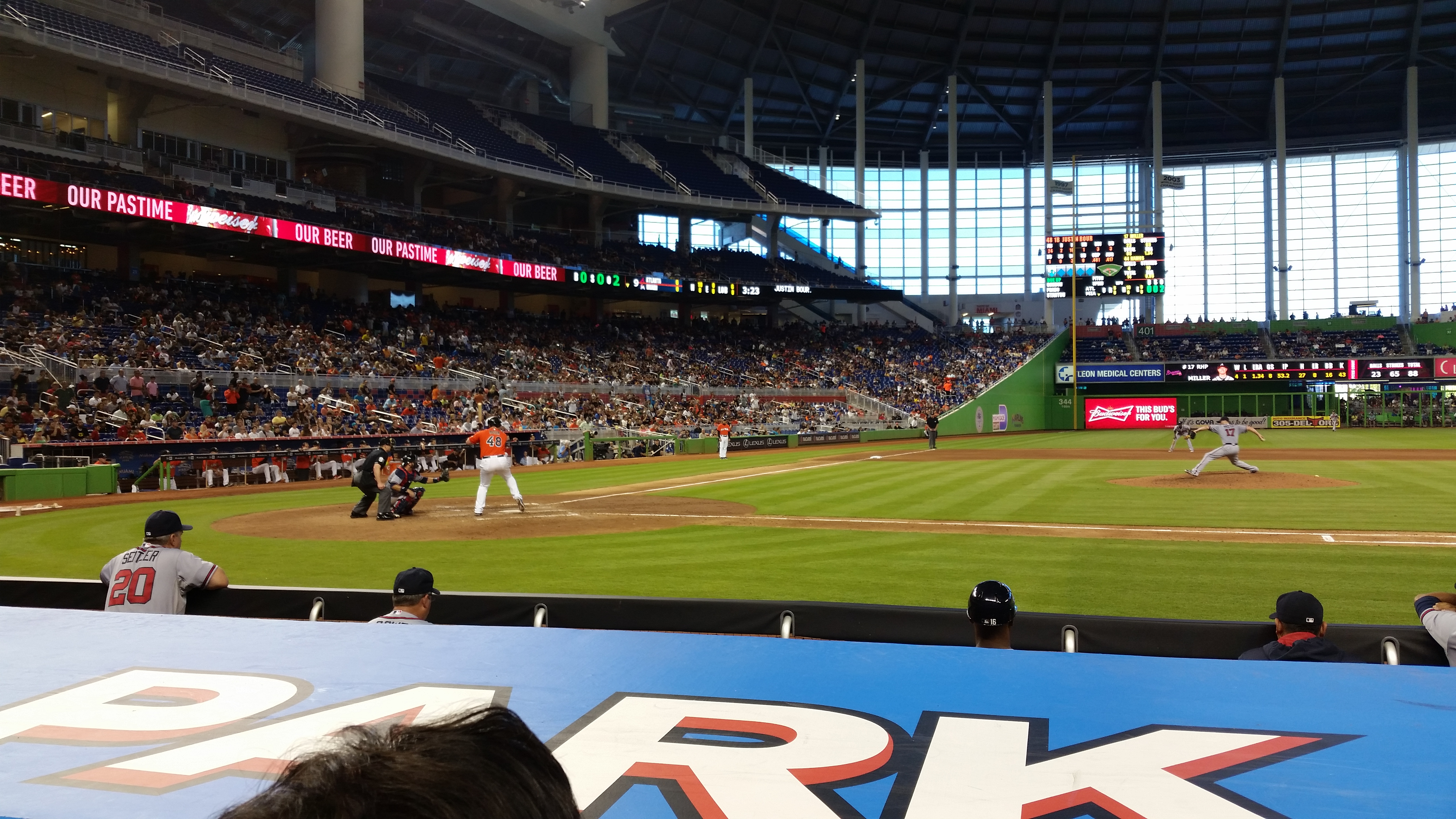
Bour breaking up no hitter in the bottom of the 9th inning with 2 outs

Bour became a regular in the Marlins lineup in 2016 after the Marlins traded away first baseman Mike Morse, who was not able to produce when signed to the full-time first base position. Bour started off strong in the 2016 season by hitting 15 home runs and 46 RBIs and batting .268 by the end of June. In June alone, Bour hit six home runs and 20 RBIs with a slash line of .317/.411/.651. This hot streak was snapped when Bour became injured July 2 by rolling his ankle against the Atlanta Braves, he was placed on the disabled list July 6. While recovering Bour played a few games with the Triple-A New Orleans team before rejoining the Marlins. The Triple-A New Orleans stint did not go as planned for Bour as he was shut down by the Marlins from continuing with the minors. Bour did return to the Marlins though and was allowed to participate in infield and batting practice with the team at the beginning of August. Since the 15 day DL leave turned into a 60-day DL stint for Bour, he did not return to the team until September 6. He remained uninjured until the end of the season but did not hit any more home runs.

Bour had a successful season in 2017, even having a couple firsts for his Major League career. One of the firsts for Bour was stealing a base, against the Arizona Diamondbacks. Bour stole second base and had the pitcher, Zack Greinke, and catcher, Jeff Mathis, sign the base for him. Bour also was invited to participate in the 2017 Home Run Derby. Bour used what he called doughnut power during his home run derby competition and was even given doughnuts by his teammate Stanton during the competition. Bour hit 22 home runs in the first round, setting a record for the fourth-most home runs in that round, but was knocked out of the competition by Aaron Judge, who hit 23 home runs. Bour finished the season with 25 home runs and 83 RBIs.

During the off season before 2018 Bour was involved in an arbitration case against the Marlins. Bour won his case and his salary for 2018 was set at $3.4 million.

In 2018 with the Marlins, Bour batted .227/.347/.412 with 19 home runs and 54 RBIs in 374 at-bats.

=== Philadelphia Phillies ===
On August 10, 2018, the Philadelphia Phillies acquired Bour and cash considerations from the Miami Marlins for minor league pitcher McKenzie Mills. As a bench player for Philadelphia, Bour batted .224/.296/.347 with one home run and five RBIs in 54 plate appearances. After the 2018 season, the Phillies put Bour through waivers, removing him from their 40-man roster. The Phillies did not tender Bour a contract offer, making him a free agent.

=== Los Angeles Angels ===
On December 15, 2018, the Los Angeles Angels signed Bour to a one-year, $2.5 million contract. Bour elected free agency following the 2019 season.

=== Hanshin Tigers ===
On December 14, 2019, Bour signed with the Hanshin Tigers of the Nippon Professional Baseball (NPB).

On November 20, 2020, he became a free agent.

=== San Francisco Giants ===
On March 2, 2021, Bour signed a minor league contract with the San Francisco Giants organization. He was assigned to the Triple-A Sacramento River Cats to begin the 2021 season. On June 25, 2021, the Giants released Bour, making him a free agent. Bour posted a .772 OPS while hitting .213 with six home runs and 17 RBI in 108 at-bats during 33 games at Triple-A. Giants manager Gabe Kapler said it was a “mutually discussed decision”.

=== LG Twins ===
On June 27, 2021, Bour signed with the LG Twins of the KBO League. In 32 games, he batted .170/.265/.280 with three home runs and 17 RBIs. Bour was not re-signed for the 2022 season and later became a free agent.

=== Diablos Rojos del México ===
On December 29, 2021, Bour signed with the Diablos Rojos del México of the Mexican League. Bour appeared in 16 games in México in 2022, batting .327/.463/.519 with two home runs and nine RBI. He was released on May 18, 2022.

On February 10, 2023, Bour announced his retirement from professional baseball via Twitter, noting that he would be completing his degree at George Mason University.

== Post-playing career ==
On February 22, 2024, Bour joined the Milwaukee Brewers as an assistant in the player development department.
