= 2006 Major League Baseball Home Run Derby =

Baseball competition

- Date: July 10, 2006
- Venue: PNC Park
- City: Pittsburgh, Pennsylvania
- Winner: Ryan Howard

The 2006 Century 21 Home Run Derby was a 2006 Major League Baseball All-Star Game event held at PNC Park, the home field of the Pittsburgh Pirates on July 10, 2006. The competition had eight competitors as usual and seven were eliminated in over three rounds. Ryan Howard of the Philadelphia Phillies defeated David Wright of the New York Mets to be crowned derby champion. A total of 87 home runs were hit in the derby.

== Competitors ==
The eight competitors were Ryan Howard of the Philadelphia Phillies, David Wright of the New York Mets, Miguel Cabrera of the Florida Marlins, 2005 Home Run Derby participant David Ortiz of the Boston Red Sox, Jermaine Dye of the Chicago White Sox, Lance Berkman of the Houston Astros, Miguel Tejada of the Baltimore Orioles, and Troy Glaus of the Toronto Blue Jays.

== Rules ==
Any ball that is swung at must be hit over the outfield wall in fair territory to be counted as a home run. A swing and a miss is an out, but if the batter doesn't swing, no out is recorded. If there is a tie, a swing off will be held. The contestant with the most home runs after five swings wins, but if there is still a tie after five swings, each contestant will be given three swings to break the tie.

=== Round One ===
Each contestant receives ten outs. The top four home run hitters advance to the next round.

=== Round Two ===
The totals from the first round carry over. Each batter again receives ten outs. The top two hitters advance to the final round.

=== Round Three ===
Home runs do not carry over in this round. The two batters receive ten outs. The contestant with the most home runs wins the derby.

== Competition ==
PNC Park, Pittsburgh—N.L. 62, A.L. 24
Player	Team	Round 1	Round 2	Subtotal	Finals	Total
Ryan Howard	Phillies	8	10	18	5	23
David Wright	Mets	16	2	18	4	22
Miguel Cabrera	Marlins	9	6	15	–	15
David Ortiz	Red Sox	10	3	13	–	13
Jermaine Dye	White Sox	7	–	7	–	7
Lance Berkman	Astros	3	–	3	–	3
Miguel Tejada	Orioles	3	–	3	–	3
Troy Glaus	Blue Jays	1	–	1	–	1

italics – Hall of Famer
