= Junior Caminero =

Dominican baseball player (born 2003)

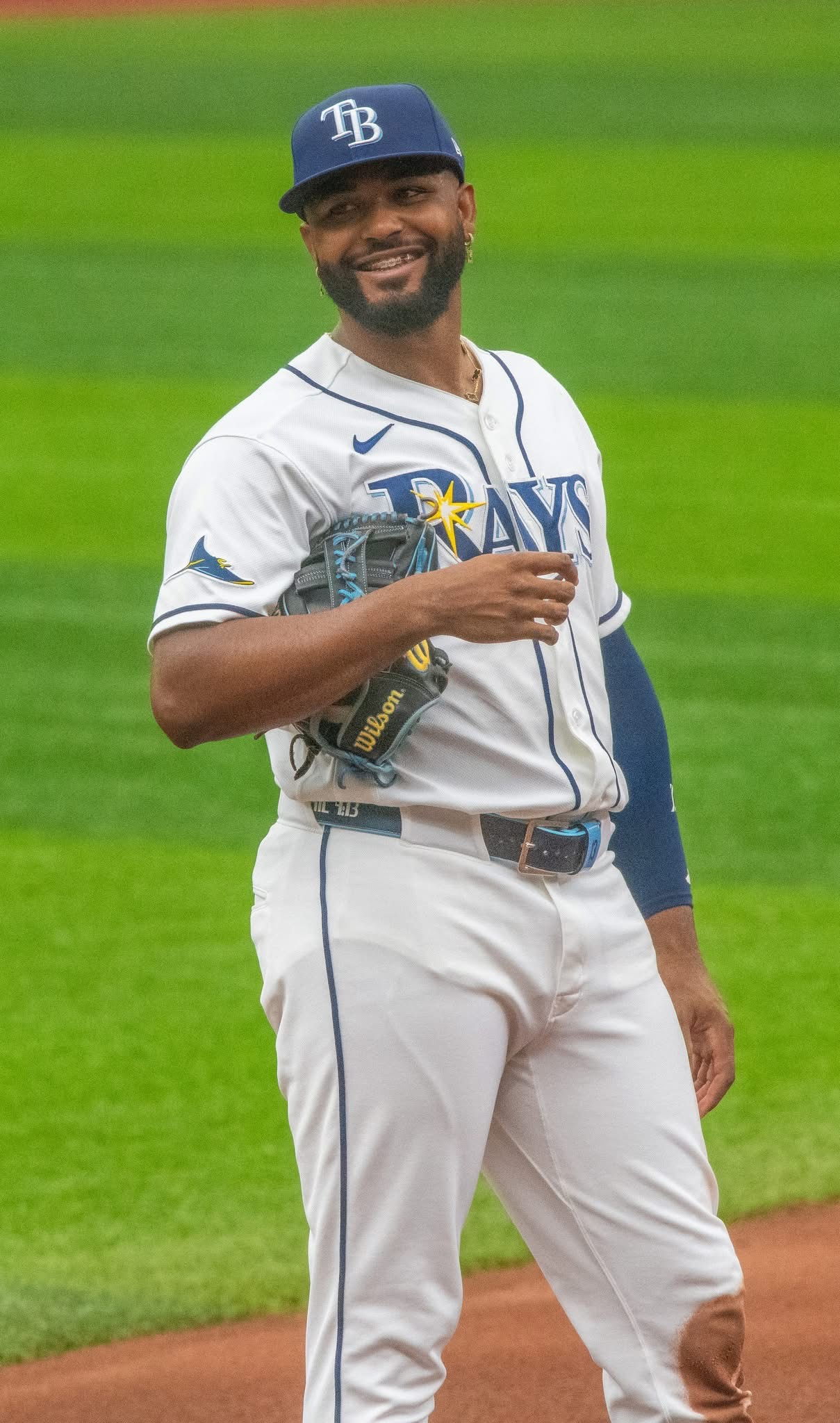
- Caminero with the Tampa Bay Rays in 2026

Tampa Bay Rays – No. 13
- Third baseman
- Born: July 5, 2003 (age 23); Santo Domingo, Dominican Republic
- Bats: Right Throws: Right

MLB debut
- September 23, 2023, for the Tampa Bay Rays

MLB statistics (through 2026 season)
- Batting average: .267
- Home runs: 94
- Runs batted in: 236
- Stats at Baseball Reference

Teams
- Tampa Bay Rays (2023–present)

Career highlights and awards
- 2× All-Star (2025, 2026); All-MLB First Team (2026); Silver Slugger Award (2026)
Medals
Men's baseball
Representing Dominican Republic
World Baseball Classic
Bronze medal – third place	2026 Miami	Team

Junior Alberto Caminero Sánchez (born July 5, 2003) is a Dominican professional baseball third baseman for the Tampa Bay Rays of Major League Baseball (MLB). He made his MLB debut in 2023. Caminero was named to consecutive MLB All-Star games in 2025 and 2026. He earned a bronze medal with the Dominican Republic at the 2026 World Baseball Classic.

== Early life ==
Caminero grew up in Santo Domingo. His father, Juan, was a truck driver. His mother, Yeudy, was a physical therapist. He played baseball from age five, also playing basketball until age sixteen. As a pre-teen in 2014, he participated in an international baseball tournament that was held in the United States.

== Career ==
=== Cleveland Indians ===
Caminero signed with the Cleveland Indians as an international free agent on July 2, 2019. He did not play in a game in 2020 due to the cancellation of the minor league season because of the COVID-19 pandemic. Caminero made his professional debut in 2021 with the Rookie-level Dominican Summer League Indians and batted .295 with nine home runs and 33 runs batted in (RBIs).

=== Tampa Bay Rays ===
==== 2022 ====
Cleveland traded Caminero to the Tampa Bay Rays for pitcher Tobias Myers on November 19, 2021. He began the 2022 season with the Florida Complex League Rays. Caminero was later promoted to the Charleston RiverDogs of the Single-A Carolina League and batted .314 with 11 home runs and 51 RBIs in 62 games between the two teams. After the season, he played for the Perth Heat of the Australian Baseball League. In 39 games Junior had a batting average of .303 with 14 home runs.

==== 2023: MLB debut ====
Caminero was assigned to the High-A Bowling Green Hot Rods at the start of the 2023 season. He was promoted to the Double-A Montgomery Biscuits after slashing .356/.409/.685 with 11 home runs, 32 RBI, and 30 runs scored in 36 games played with the Hot Rods. Caminero was selected to play in the 2023 All-Star Futures Game. In 81 games for Montgomery, he hit .309/.373/.548 with 20 home runs and 62 RBI. On September 22, 2023, Caminero was selected to the 40-man roster and promoted to the major leagues for the first time. He made his MLB debut on September 23. Caminero won the 2023 Southern League Most Valuable Player Award and Top MLB Prospect Award for his performance with Montgomery.

==== 2024 ====
Caminero was optioned to the Triple–A Durham Bulls to begin the 2024 season. He suffered a quad injury three games into Durham's season and spent the next two weeks on the injured list. He suffered a more serious quad injury on May 28, 2024. In 43 games for the Rays, he hit .248/.299/.424 with six home runs and 18 RBI.

Following the season, Caminero played winter league baseball for the Leones del Escogido of the Dominican Professional Baseball League. In Game 7 of the championship series, Caminero hit a go-ahead home run off Jairo Asencio, the closer of the Tigres del Licey in the top of the ninth inning leading to a championship for Leones.

==== 2025: First full MLB season, All-Star selection ====
On May 31, 2025, Caminero recorded two doubles, two home runs, and five RBIs against the Houston Astros in a 16–3 blowout win. He became the first player in Tampa Bay Rays history to record two doubles and two home runs in a single game. On June 2, Caminero was named the American League Player of the Week, co-winning with Cal Raleigh for May 26 – June 1, a span in which he batted .379 (11–29) with 8 runs, 4 home runs, 13 RBIs, 8 extra base hits, and an OPS of 1.331. It was his first career Player of the Week Award. Caminero was selected to the All-Star Game as an injury replacement. He was also a contestant in the Home Run Derby, getting to the final round, where he was defeated by Cal Raleigh.

Caminero ended his 2025 breakout season batting .264/.311/.535 with 45 home runs and 110 RBIs; he fell one home run shy of tying Carlos Peña's single-season Rays record. Caminero also led the majors with 31 double plays grounded into.

==== 2026 ====
Against the Kansas City Royals on June 25, Caminero had the first three-homer game of his career. Caminero won the AL Player of the Month Award for the month of June, after slashing .327/.402/.673, with 10 home runs and 24 RBI for the month. On July 1, Caminero, at just 22 years old, became the youngest player to ever hit a home run in six straight games, surpassing Ken Griffey Jr. On July 4, Caminero was selected to start at Third Base at the 2026 All-Star Game, making it his second consecutive year being named as an All-Star. He was also a contestant in the Home Run Derby for the second consecutive year, getting to the semifinals, where he was defeated by eventual winner Jordan Walker. In the following All Star Game, Caminero was hit by a pitch from Cardinals pitcher Riley O'Brien in the 2nd inning and had to leave the game. X-rays taken the same night came back negative.

Against the Houston Astros on September 11, Caminero hit a walk off home run to clinch the Rays a postseason spot, his 40th of the season. He became the first player in Rays franchise history with multiple 40 home run seasons and the second major league player in the modern era with back to back 40 home run seasons in his age 22 or younger season. On September 26, Caminero became the first player in Rays franchise history to record back-to-back seasons with 40 or more home runs and 100 or more runs batted in after recording his 100th and 101st RBI of the season against the Philadelphia Phillies.

To close out the 2026 year, Caminero played a complete season of 162 games with a .276 batting average, 42 home runs, and 101 RBI.

On November 2, Caminero was named a finalist for the American League Most Valuable Player Award alongside Yordan Alvarez and Bobby Witt Jr.

== Personal life ==
At Junior's suggestion, his younger brother was named Girardi in honor of Joe Girardi, who was then the manager of the New York Yankees.

Caminero's wife, Francesca, gave birth to their first child, a girl named Valentina, in November 2025.

== Awards and honors ==
=== MLB ===
- 2× All-Star (2025, 2026)
- All-MLB First Team (2026)
- All-MLB Second Team (2025)
- American League Player of the Month (June 2026)
- 2× American League Player of the Week (May 26 – June 1, 2025; June 22 – June 28, 2026)

=== MiLB ===
- MiLB Breakout Player of the Year (2023)
- Southern League Most Valuable Player Award (2023)
- Baseball America Minor League All-Star (2023)

=== International ===
- Dominican Professional Baseball champion (2025)
- Dominican Professional Baseball Finals MVP (2025)
- Caribbean Series champion (2025)
- World Baseball Classic bronze medalist (2026)

Awards
Preceded by Nick Kurtz	American League Player of the Month; June 2026	Succeeded by Yordan Alvarez
