= All-MLB Team =

Annual Major League Baseball honor

- Sport: Baseball
- League: Major League Baseball
- Awarded for: Best players at each position as voted by fans and a panel of experts (50% weight each)

History
- First award: 2019

The All-MLB Team is an annual Major League Baseball (MLB) honor bestowed upon the best players across both leagues at each position during the season. Selections to the first and second teams are determined by a fan vote and a panel consisting of media members, former players, and baseball officials. The honor was established in 2019.

The career leader in selections is Shohei Ohtani, who has been named an All-MLB player eight times. Ohtani is also the only player to be named to both teams in the same season (as a designated hitter and starting pitcher respectively), accomplished in 2021 and 2022, and is the only player to be named to the first team twice in the same season, in 2023. The leader as measured by number of seasons named All-MLB is Yordan Alvarez, who has been selected All-MLB in 6 seasons.

== Description ==
The roster of each team consists of one catcher, four infielders (one for each position), three outfielders regardless of position, one designated hitter, five starting pitchers, and two relief pitchers. Before the 2022 season, the designated hitter was only used in the American League (as well as interleague games hosted by American League teams), except during the COVID-19-affected 2020 season.

== Selections ==
^	Denotes players who are still active in MLB
Player (X)	Denotes the number of times the player has been selected
**Player** **(in bold text)**	Indicates the player who won the American/National League Most Valuable Player Award in the same year
Player (in italics)	Indicates the player who won the American/National League Cy Young Award in the same year

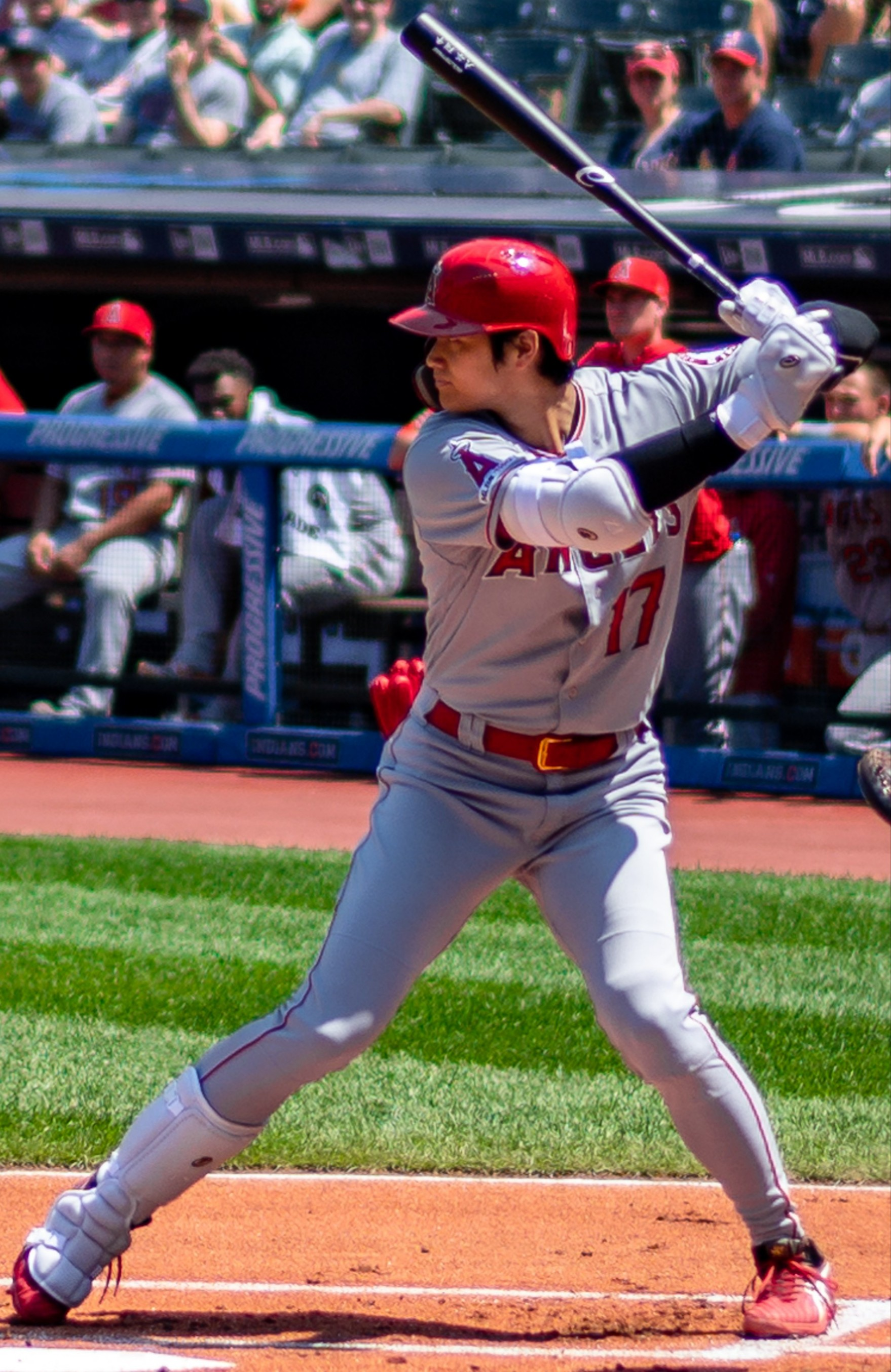
Shohei Ohtani has been selected to the All-MLB team 8 times.

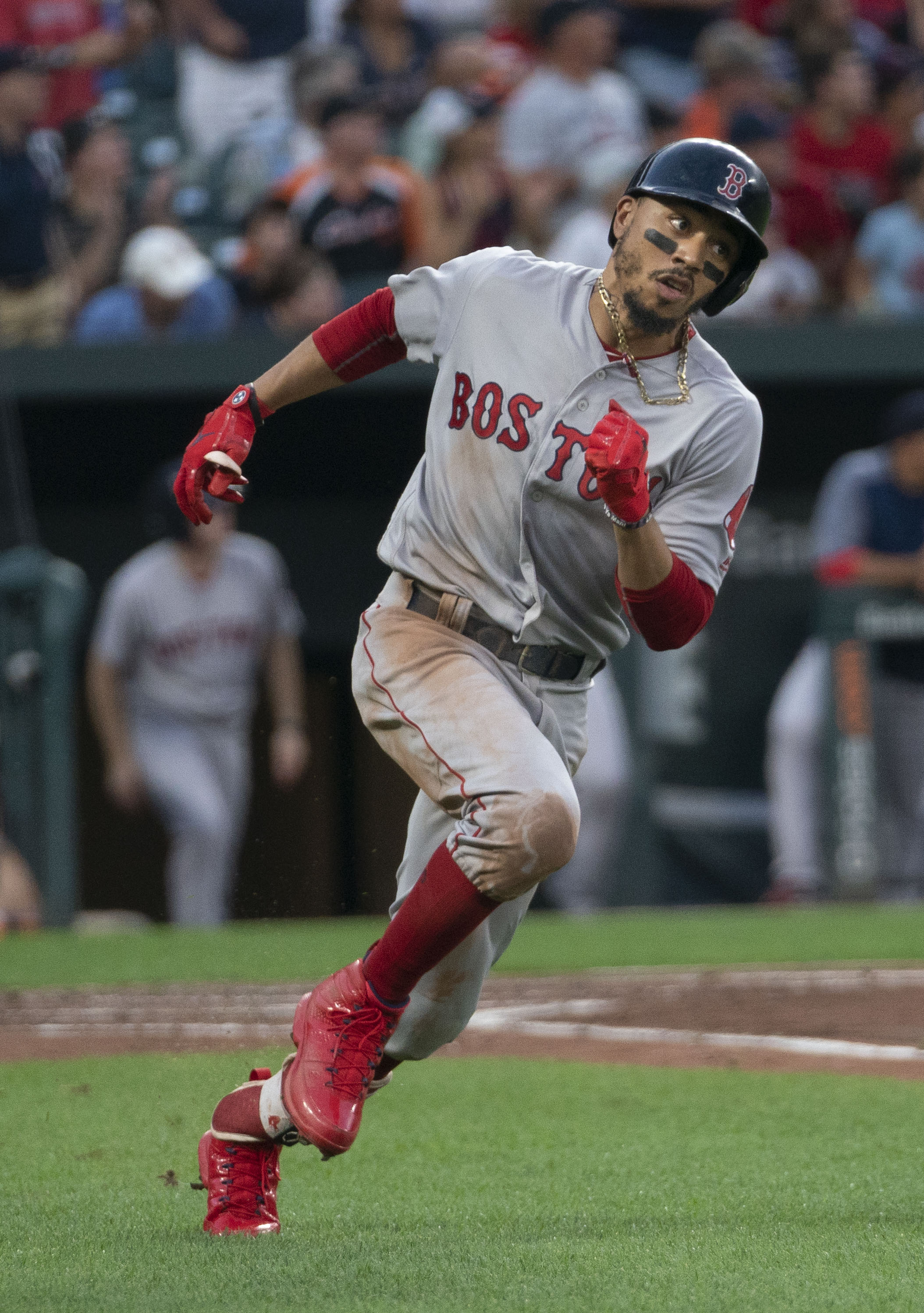
Mookie Betts has been selected to the All-MLB team 5 times.

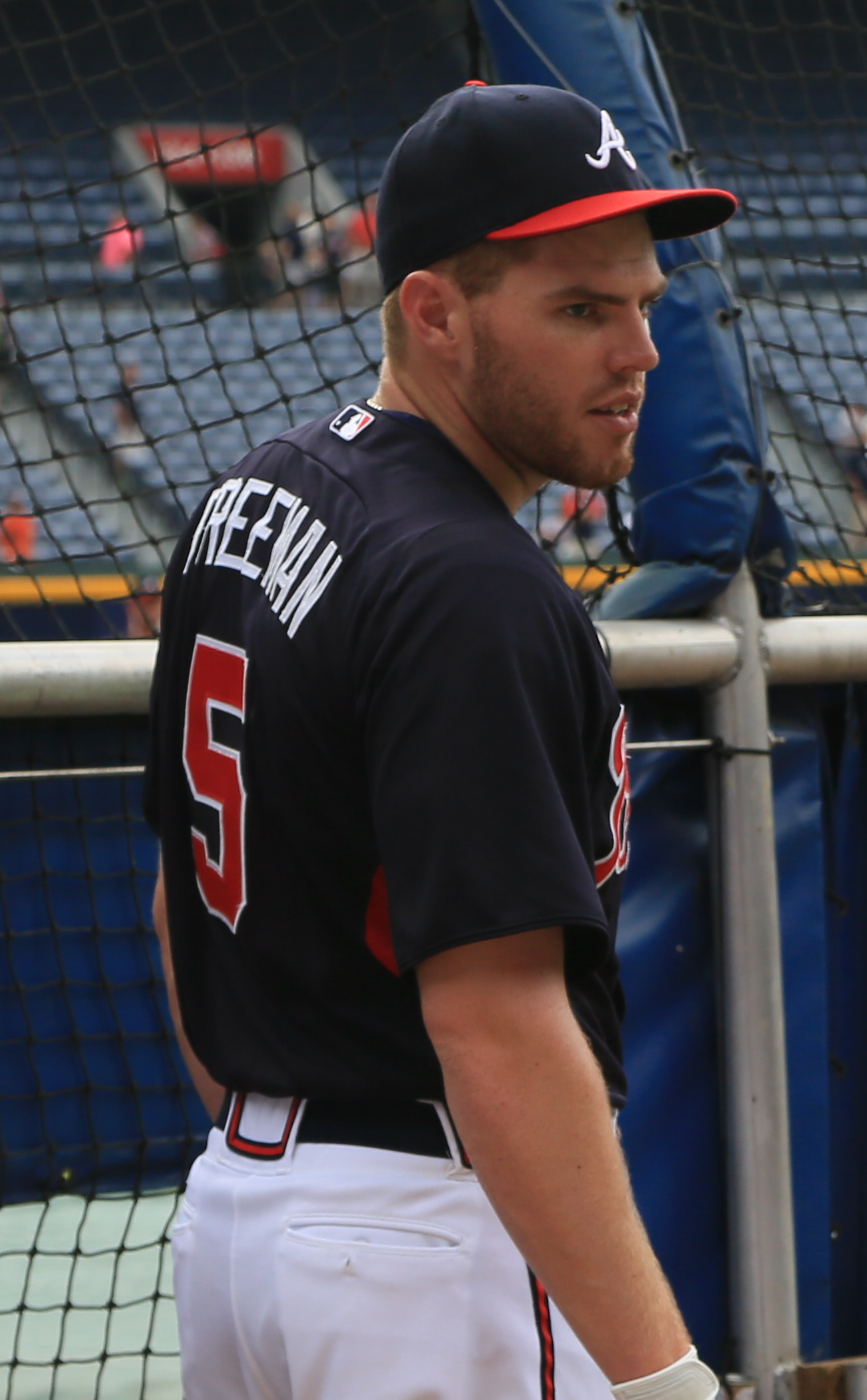
Freddie Freeman has been selected to the All-MLB team 5 times.

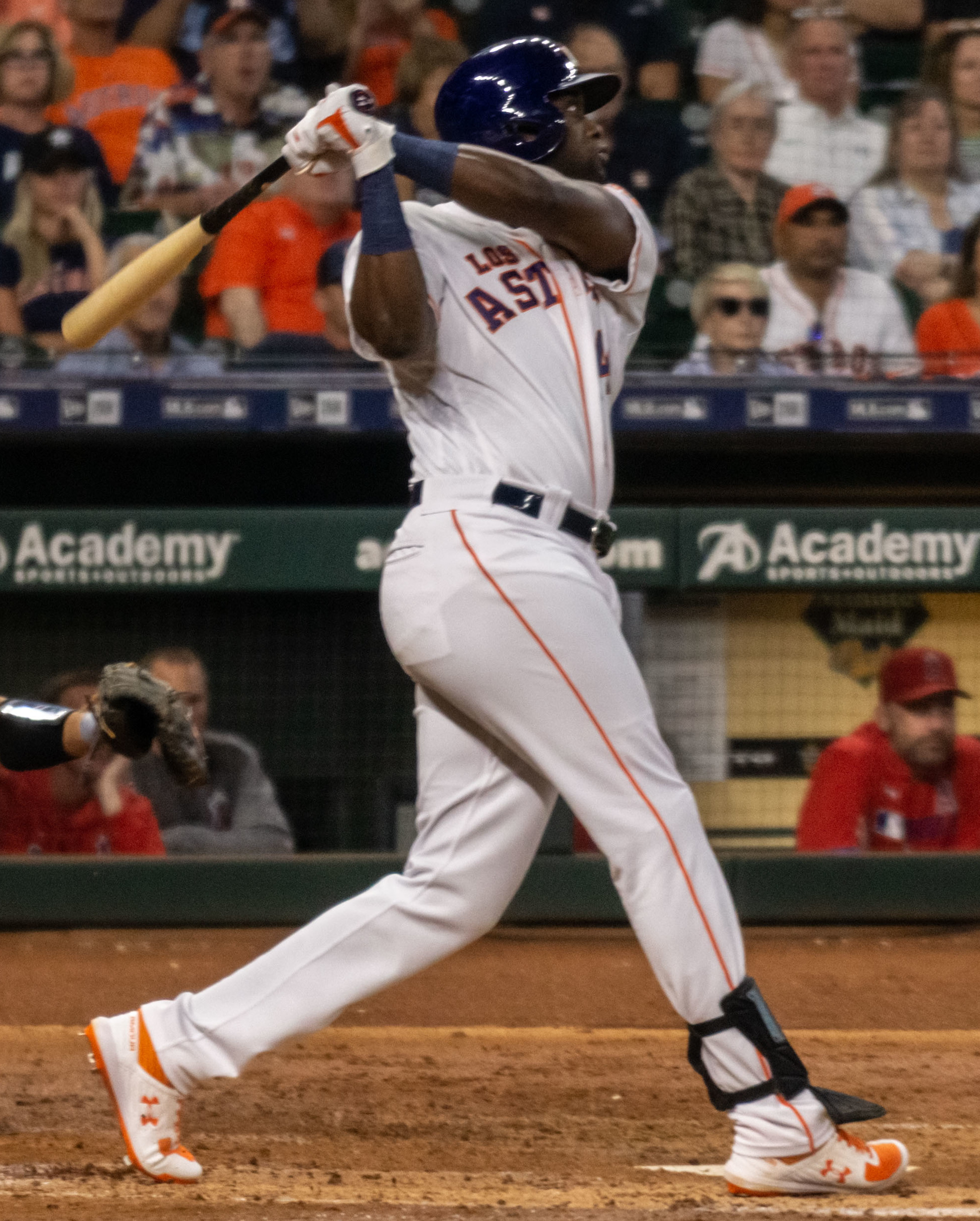
Yordan Alvarez has been selected to the All-MLB team 6 times.

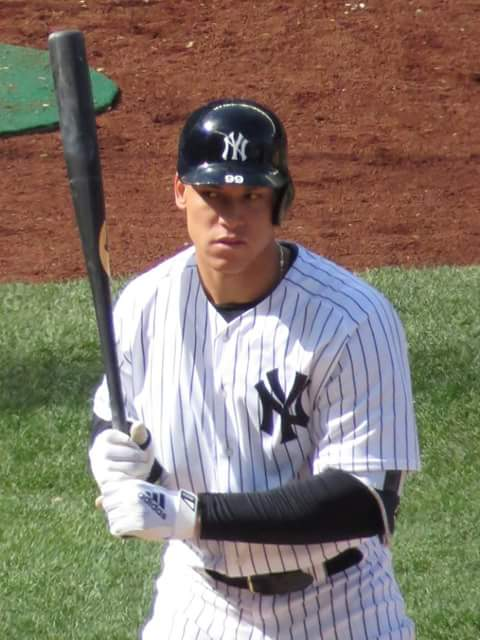
Aaron Judge has been selected to the All-MLB team 5 times.

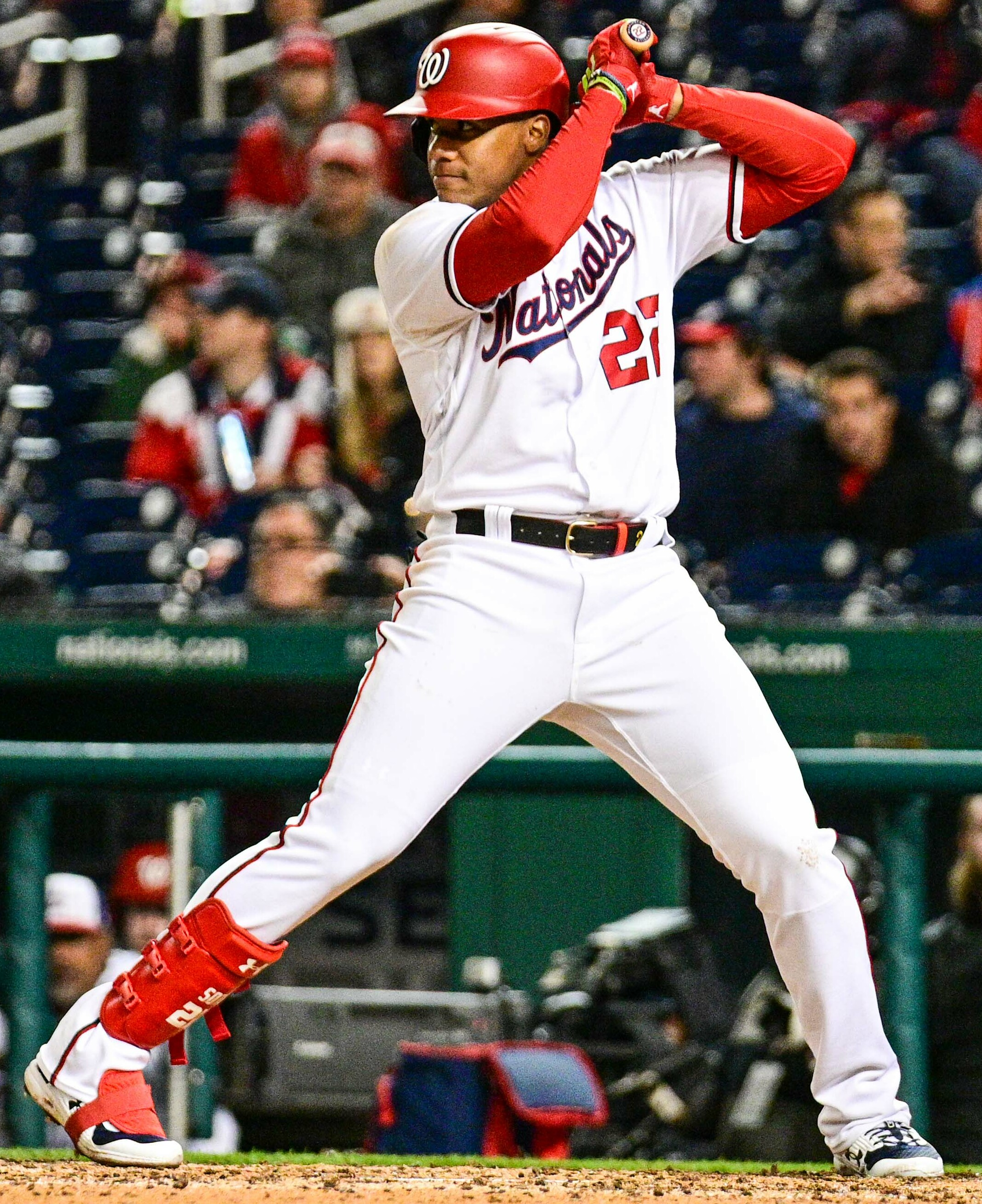
Juan Soto has been selected to the All-MLB team 5 times.

Season	Position	First team		Second team	
Season	Position	Player	Team	Player	Team
2019	C	J. T. Realmuto^	Philadelphia Phillies	Yasmani Grandal	Milwaukee Brewers
2019	1B	Pete Alonso^	New York Mets	Freddie Freeman^	Atlanta Braves
2019	2B	DJ LeMahieu	New York Yankees	Jose Altuve^	Houston Astros
2019	3B	Anthony Rendon	Washington Nationals	Alex Bregman^	Houston Astros
2019	SS	Xander Bogaerts^	Boston Red Sox	Marcus Semien^	Oakland Athletics
2019	OF	**Cody Bellinger**^	Los Angeles Dodgers	Ronald Acuña Jr.^	Atlanta Braves
2019	OF	**Mike Trout**^	Los Angeles Angels	Mookie Betts^	Boston Red Sox
2019	OF	Christian Yelich^	Milwaukee Brewers	Juan Soto^	Washington Nationals
2019	DH	Nelson Cruz	Minnesota Twins	Yordan Alvarez^	Houston Astros
2019	SP	Gerrit Cole^	Houston Astros	Jack Flaherty^	St. Louis Cardinals
2019	SP	Jacob deGrom^	New York Mets	Zack Greinke	Arizona Diamondbacks; Houston Astros
2019	SP	Max Scherzer^	Washington Nationals	Charlie Morton	Tampa Bay Rays
2019	SP	Stephen Strasburg	Washington Nationals	Hyun-jin Ryu	Los Angeles Dodgers
2019	SP	Justin Verlander	Houston Astros	Michael Soroka^	Atlanta Braves
2019	RP	Josh Hader^	Milwaukee Brewers	Aroldis Chapman^	New York Yankees
2019	RP	Kirby Yates	San Diego Padres	Liam Hendriks	Oakland Athletics
2020	C	Salvador Pérez^	Kansas City Royals	J. T. Realmuto^ (2)	Philadelphia Phillies
2020	1B	**Freddie Freeman**^ (2)	Atlanta Braves	**José Abreu**^	Chicago White Sox
2020	2B	DJ LeMahieu (2)	New York Yankees	Brandon Lowe^	Tampa Bay Rays
2020	3B	Manny Machado^	San Diego Padres	José Ramírez^	Cleveland Indians
2020	SS	Fernando Tatís Jr.^	San Diego Padres	Corey Seager^	Los Angeles Dodgers
2020	OF	Mookie Betts^ (2)	Los Angeles Dodgers	Ronald Acuña Jr.^ (2)	Atlanta Braves
2020	OF	Juan Soto^ (2)	Washington Nationals	Michael Conforto^	New York Mets
2020	OF	Mike Trout^ (2)	Los Angeles Angels	Mike Yastrzemski^	San Francisco Giants
2020	DH	Marcell Ozuna^	Atlanta Braves	Nelson Cruz (2)	Minnesota Twins
2020	SP	Trevor Bauer	Cincinnati Reds	Gerrit Cole^ (2)	New York Yankees
2020	SP	Shane Bieber^	Cleveland Indians	Clayton Kershaw	Los Angeles Dodgers
2020	SP	Yu Darvish^	Chicago Cubs	Dinelson Lamet	San Diego Padres
2020	SP	Jacob deGrom^ (2)	New York Mets	Kenta Maeda	Minnesota Twins
2020	SP	Max Fried^	Atlanta Braves	Hyun-jin Ryu (2)	Toronto Blue Jays
2020	RP	Nick Anderson	Tampa Bay Rays	Brad Hand	Cleveland Indians
2020	RP	Liam Hendriks (2)	Oakland Athletics	Devin Williams^	Milwaukee Brewers
2021	C	Salvador Pérez^ (2)	Kansas City Royals	Buster Posey	San Francisco Giants
2021	1B	Vladimir Guerrero Jr.^	Toronto Blue Jays	Freddie Freeman^ (3)	Atlanta Braves
2021	2B	Marcus Semien^ (2)	Toronto Blue Jays	Ozzie Albies^	Atlanta Braves
2021	3B	Austin Riley^	Atlanta Braves	Rafael Devers^	Boston Red Sox
2021	SS	Fernando Tatís Jr.^ (2)	San Diego Padres	Trea Turner^	Washington Nationals; Los Angeles Dodgers
2021	OF	**Bryce Harper**^	Philadelphia Phillies	Nick Castellanos^	Cincinnati Reds
2021	OF	Aaron Judge^	New York Yankees	Teoscar Hernández^	Toronto Blue Jays
2021	OF	Juan Soto^ (3)	Washington Nationals	Kyle Tucker^	Houston Astros
2021	DH	**Shohei Ohtani**^	Los Angeles Angels	Yordan Alvarez^ (2)	Houston Astros
2021	SP	Walker Buehler^	Los Angeles Dodgers	Max Fried^ (2)	Atlanta Braves
2021	SP	Corbin Burnes^	Milwaukee Brewers	Kevin Gausman^	San Francisco Giants
2021	SP	Gerrit Cole^ (3)	New York Yankees	**Shohei Ohtani**^ (2)	Los Angeles Angels
2021	SP	Robbie Ray^	Toronto Blue Jays	Julio Urías	Los Angeles Dodgers
2021	SP	Max Scherzer^ (2)	Washington Nationals; Los Angeles Dodgers	Zack Wheeler^	Philadelphia Phillies
2021	RP	Josh Hader^ (2)	Milwaukee Brewers	Raisel Iglesias^	Los Angeles Angels
2021	RP	Liam Hendriks (3)	Chicago White Sox	Kenley Jansen^	Los Angeles Dodgers
2022	C	J. T. Realmuto^ (3)	Philadelphia Phillies	Will Smith^	Los Angeles Dodgers
2022	1B	**Paul Goldschmidt**^	St. Louis Cardinals	Freddie Freeman^ (4)	Los Angeles Dodgers
2022	2B	Jose Altuve^ (2)	Houston Astros	Andrés Giménez^	Cleveland Guardians
2022	3B	Manny Machado^ (2)	San Diego Padres	Nolan Arenado^	St. Louis Cardinals
2022	SS	Trea Turner^ (2)	Los Angeles Dodgers	Francisco Lindor^	New York Mets
2022	OF	Mookie Betts^ (3)	Los Angeles Dodgers	Julio Rodríguez^	Seattle Mariners
2022	OF	**Aaron Judge**^ (2)	New York Yankees	Kyle Schwarber^	Philadelphia Phillies
2022	OF	Mike Trout^ (3)	Los Angeles Angels	Kyle Tucker^ (2)	Houston Astros
2022	DH	Yordan Alvarez^ (3)	Houston Astros	Shohei Ohtani^ (4)	Los Angeles Angels
2022	SP	Sandy Alcántara^	Miami Marlins	Dylan Cease^	Chicago White Sox
2022	SP	Alek Manoah^	Toronto Blue Jays	Max Fried^ (3)	Atlanta Braves
2022	SP	Shohei Ohtani^ (3)	Los Angeles Angels	Aaron Nola^	Philadelphia Phillies
2022	SP	Framber Valdez^	Houston Astros	Max Scherzer^ (3)	New York Mets
2022	SP	Justin Verlander (2)	Houston Astros	Julio Urías (2)	Los Angeles Dodgers
2022	RP	Emmanuel Clase^	Cleveland Guardians	Ryan Helsley^	St. Louis Cardinals
2022	RP	Edwin Díaz^	New York Mets	Ryan Pressly	Houston Astros
2023	C	Adley Rutschman^	Baltimore Orioles	Jonah Heim^	Texas Rangers
2023	1B	Freddie Freeman^ (5)	Los Angeles Dodgers	Matt Olson^	Atlanta Braves
2023	2B	Marcus Semien^ (3)	Texas Rangers	Ozzie Albies^ (2)	Atlanta Braves
2023	3B	Austin Riley^ (2)	Atlanta Braves	José Ramírez^ (2)	Cleveland Guardians
2023	SS	Corey Seager^ (2)	Texas Rangers	Francisco Lindor^ (2)	New York Mets
2023	OF	**Ronald Acuña Jr.**^ (3)	Atlanta Braves	Adolis García^	Texas Rangers
2023	OF	Mookie Betts^ (4)	Los Angeles Dodgers	Aaron Judge^ (3)	New York Yankees
2023	OF	Corbin Carroll^	Arizona Diamondbacks	Kyle Tucker^ (3)	Houston Astros
2023	DH	**Shohei Ohtani**^ (5)	Los Angeles Angels	Yordan Alvarez^ (4)	Houston Astros
2023	SP	Gerrit Cole^ (4)	New York Yankees	Kyle Bradish^	Baltimore Orioles
2023	SP	Zac Gallen^	Arizona Diamondbacks	Nathan Eovaldi^	Texas Rangers
2023	SP	**Shohei Ohtani**^ (6)	Los Angeles Angels	Kevin Gausman^ (2)	Toronto Blue Jays
2023	SP	Blake Snell^	San Diego Padres	Sonny Gray^	Minnesota Twins
2023	SP	Spencer Strider^	Atlanta Braves	Jordan Montgomery^	St. Louis Cardinals; Texas Rangers
2023	RP	Josh Hader^ (3)	San Diego Padres	Devin Williams^ (2)	Milwaukee Brewers
2023	RP	Félix Bautista^	Baltimore Orioles	Emmanuel Clase^ (2)	Cleveland Guardians
2024	C	William Contreras^	Milwaukee Brewers	Salvador Pérez^ (3)	Kansas City Royals
2024	1B	Vladimir Guerrero Jr.^ (2)	Toronto Blue Jays	Bryce Harper^ (2)	Philadelphia Phillies
2024	2B	Ketel Marte^	Arizona Diamondbacks	Jose Altuve^ (3)	Houston Astros
2024	3B	José Ramírez^ (3)	Cleveland Guardians	Manny Machado^ (3)	San Diego Padres
2024	SS	Bobby Witt Jr.^	Kansas City Royals	Francisco Lindor^ (3)	New York Mets
2024	OF	Mookie Betts^ (5)	Los Angeles Dodgers	Jarren Duran^	Boston Red Sox
2024	OF	**Aaron Judge**^ (4)	New York Yankees	Teoscar Hernández^ (2)	Los Angeles Dodgers
2024	OF	Juan Soto^ (4)	New York Yankees	Jackson Merrill^	San Diego Padres
2024	DH	**Shohei Ohtani**^ (7)	Los Angeles Dodgers	Yordan Alvarez^ (5)	Houston Astros
2024	SP	Corbin Burnes^ (2)	Baltimore Orioles	Dylan Cease^ (2)	San Diego Padres
2024	SP	Chris Sale^	Atlanta Braves	Shota Imanaga^	Chicago Cubs
2024	SP	Paul Skenes^	Pittsburgh Pirates	Michael King^	San Diego Padres
2024	SP	Tarik Skubal^	Detroit Tigers	Seth Lugo^	Kansas City Royals
2024	SP	Zack Wheeler^ (2)	Philadelphia Phillies	Framber Valdez^ (2)	Houston Astros
2024	RP	Emmanuel Clase^ (3)	Cleveland Guardians	Mason Miller^	Oakland Athletics
2024	RP	Ryan Helsley^ (2)	St. Louis Cardinals	Kirby Yates (2)	Texas Rangers
2025	C	Cal Raleigh^	Seattle Mariners	Will Smith (2)	Los Angeles Dodgers
2025	1B	Vladimir Guerrero Jr.^ (3)	Toronto Blue Jays	Nick Kurtz^	Athletics
2025	2B	Ketel Marte^ (2)	Arizona Diamondbacks	Brice Turang^	Milwaukee Brewers
2025	3B	José Ramírez^ (4)	Cleveland Guardians	Junior Caminero^	Tampa Bay Rays
2025	SS	Bobby Witt Jr.^ (2)	Kansas City Royals	Bo Bichette^	Toronto Blue Jays
2025	OF	**Aaron Judge**^ (5)	New York Yankees	Cody Bellinger^ (2)	New York Yankees
2025	OF	Julio Rodríguez^ (2)	Seattle Mariners	Corbin Carroll^ (2)	Arizona Diamondbacks
2025	OF	Juan Soto^ (5)	New York Mets	Pete Crow-Armstrong^	Chicago Cubs
2025	DH	**Shohei Ohtani**^ (8)	Los Angeles Dodgers	Kyle Schwarber^ (2)	Philadelphia Phillies
2025	SP	Garrett Crochet^	Boston Red Sox	Hunter Brown^	Houston Astros
2025	SP	Max Fried^ (4)	New York Yankees	Freddy Peralta^	Milwaukee Brewers
2025	SP	Paul Skenes^ (2)	Pittsburgh Pirates	Cristopher Sánchez^	Philadelphia Phillies
2025	SP	Tarik Skubal^ (2)	Detroit Tigers	Zach Wheeler^ (3)	Philadelphia Phillies
2025	SP	Yoshinobu Yamamoto^	Los Angeles Dodgers	Bryan Woo^	Seattle Mariners
2025	RP	Aroldis Chapman^ (2)	Boston Red Sox	Edwin Díaz^ (2)	New York Mets
2025	RP	Jhoan Durán^	Minnesota Twins; Philadelphia Phillies	Andrés Muñoz^	Seattle Mariners
2026	C	Gabriel Moreno^	Arizona Diamondbacks	William Contreras^ (2)	Milwaukee Brewers
2026	1B	Pete Alonso^ (2)	Baltimore Orioles	Willson Contreras^	Boston Red Sox
2026	2B	Brice Turang^ (2)	Milwaukee Brewers	Brandon Lowe^ (2)	Pittsburgh Pirates
2026	3B	Junior Caminero^ (2)	Tampa Bay Rays	Alex Bregman^ (2)	Chicago Cubs
2026	SS	Bobby Witt Jr.^ (3)	Kansas City Royals	Elly De La Cruz^	Cincinnati Reds
2026	OF	Jackson Chourio^	Milwaukee Brewers	Randy Arozarena^	Seattle Mariners
2026	OF	**Pete Crow-Armstrong**^ (2)	Chicago Cubs	Jordan Walker^	St. Louis Cardinals
2026	OF	Fernando Tatís Jr.^ (3)	San Diego Padres	James Wood^	Washington Nationals
2026	DH	**Yordan Alvarez**^ (6)	Houston Astros	Ben Rice^	New York Yankees
2026	SP	Dylan Cease^ (3)	Toronto Blue Jays	Sonny Gray^ (2)	Boston Red Sox
2026	SP	Jacob Misiorowski^	Milwaukee Brewers	Jesús Luzardo^	Philadelphia Phillies
2026	SP	Chris Sale^ (2)	Atlanta Braves	Drew Rasmussen^	Tampa Bay Rays
2026	SP	Cristopher Sánchez^ (2)	Philadelphia Phillies	Tarik Skubal^ (3)	Detroit Tigers; Los Angeles Dodgers
2026	SP	Cam Schlittler^	New York Yankees	Yoshinobu Yamamoto^ (2)	Los Angeles Dodgers
2026	RP	Mason Miller^ (2)	San Diego Padres	Bryan Baker^	Tampa Bay Rays
2026	RP	Louis Varland^	Toronto Blue Jays	Cade Smith^	Cleveland Guardians

== Most selections ==
The following players have been selected for an All-MLB Team three or more times.

Updated as of the conclusion of the 2026 MLB season.

^	Denotes players who are still active in Major League Baseball

All-MLB Team Appearances
Player	Pos	Total	First Team	Second Team
Shohei Ohtani^{^}	DH/SP	8	6	2
Yordan Alvarez^{^}	DH	6	2	4
Mookie Betts^{^}	OF	5	4	1
Juan Soto^{^}	OF	5	4	1
Aaron Judge^{^}	OF	5	4	1
Freddie Freeman^{^}	1B	5	2	3
Gerrit Cole^{^}	SP	4	3	1
José Ramírez^	3B	4	2	2
Max Fried^{^}	SP	4	2	2
Josh Hader^{^}	RP	3	3	0
Mike Trout^{^}	OF	3	3	0
Vladimir Guerrero Jr.^{^}	1B	3	3	0
Emmanuel Clase^	RP	3	2	1
Liam Hendriks^{^}	RP	3	2	1
Manny Machado^	3B	3	2	1
J. T. Realmuto^	C	3	2	1
Salvador Pérez^	C	3	2	1
Max Scherzer^{^}	SP	3	2	1
Marcus Semien^{^}	SS/2B	3	2	1
Ronald Acuña Jr.^{^}	OF	3	1	2
Jose Altuve^	2B	3	1	2
Zack Wheeler^{^}	SP	3	1	2
Francisco Lindor^	SS	3	0	3
Kyle Tucker^{^}	OF	3	0	3
Bobby Witt Jr.^{^}	SS	3	3	0
Fernando Tatís Jr.^{^}	SS/OF	3	3	0
Dylan Cease^{^}	SP	3	1	2
Tarik Skubal^{^}	SP	3	2	1

== See also ==
- All-NBA Team, a similar honor for National Basketball Association (NBA) players
- All-Pro, a similar honor for National Football League (NFL) players
- NHL All-Star team, a similar honor for National Hockey League (NHL) players
- MLS Best XI, a similar honor for Major League Soccer (MLS) players.
- NPB Best Nine, a similar honor in Nippon Professional Baseball for top players at each position in the Central and Pacific League.
