= List of Major League Baseball postseason records =

The following is a complete list of postseason career records for both pitching and batting as of the end of the 2025 Major League Baseball postseason. Note that the teams listed are not necessarily the players' career teams or even their primary team but rather the teams with whom they made their postseason appearances with.

== Batting ==
=== Batting average ===
Minimum 35 plate appearances
#	Player	Team(s)	BA	PA
1	Bobby Brown	New York Yankees	.439	46
2	Colby Rasmus	St. Louis Cardinals; Houston Astros	.423	35
3	Pepper Martin	St. Louis Cardinals	.418	60
4	Carlos González	Colorado Rockies	.412	38
5	Sean Casey	Detroit Tigers; Boston Red Sox	.410	41
6	Fred Lynn	Boston Red Sox; California Angels	.407	61
7	Billy Hatcher	Houston Astros; Cincinnati Reds	.404	61
8	José Offerman	Los Angeles Dodgers; Boston Red Sox; Minnesota Twins	.400	53
9	Monte Irvin	New York Giants	.394	36
10	Lou Brock	St. Louis Cardinals	.391	92

=== On-base percentage ===
Minimum 35 plate appearances
#	Player	Team(s)	OBP	PA
1	Colby Rasmus	St. Louis Cardinals; Houston Astros	.571	35
2	Bobby Brown	New York Yankees	.500	46
3	José Offerman	Los Angeles Dodgers; Boston Red Sox; Minnesota Twins	.491	53
4	Willie Aikens	Kansas City Royals	.490	49
5	Hank Thompson	New York Giants	.486	37
6	Lou Gehrig	New York Yankees	.483	150
7	Jesse Winker	Cincinnati Reds; Milwaukee Brewers; New York Mets	.476	42
8	Carlos González	Colorado Rockies	.474	38
9	Babe Ruth	Boston Red Sox; New York Yankees	.470	167
10	Pepper Martin	St. Louis Cardinals	.467	60

=== Slugging percentage ===
Minimum 35 plate appearances
#	Player	Team(s)	SLG%	PA
1	Colby Rasmus	St. Louis Cardinals; Houston Astros	1.038	35
2	Carlos Delgado	New York Mets	.757	43
3	Troy Glaus	Anaheim Angels; St. Louis Cardinals; Atlanta Braves	.756	88
4	Babe Ruth	Boston Red Sox; New York Yankees	.744	167
5	Juan González	Texas Rangers; Cleveland Indians	.742	66
6	Lou Gehrig	New York Yankees	.731	150
7	Adolis García	Texas Rangers	.726	68
8	Willie Aikens	Kansas City Royals	.725	49
9	Henry Aaron	Milwaukee / Atlanta Braves	.710	74
10	Fernando Tatís Jr.	San Diego Padres	.700	70

=== Plate appearances ===
#	Player	Team(s)	PA
1	Derek Jeter	New York Yankees	734
2	Bernie Williams	New York Yankees	545
3	Manny Ramirez	Cleveland Indians; Boston Red Sox; Los Angeles Dodgers	493
4	Jorge Posada	New York Yankees	492
5	Jose Altuve	Houston Astros	488
6	David Justice	Atlanta Braves; Cleveland Indians; New York Yankees; Oakland Athletics	471
7	Alex Bregman	Houston Astros; Boston Red Sox	451
8	Kenny Lofton	Cleveland Indians; Atlanta Braves; San Francisco Giants; Chicago Cubs; New York Yankees; Los Angeles Dodgers	438
9	Mookie Betts	Boston Red Sox; Los Angeles Dodgers	420
10	Chipper Jones	Atlanta Braves	417

=== At bats ===
#	Player	Team(s)	At bats
1	Derek Jeter	New York Yankees	650
2	Bernie Williams	New York Yankees	465
3	Jose Altuve	Houston Astros	440
4	Jorge Posada	New York Yankees	416
5	Manny Ramirez	Cleveland Indians; Boston Red Sox; Los Angeles Dodgers	410
6	David Justice	Atlanta Braves; Cleveland Indians; New York Yankees; Oakland Athletics	398
7	Kenny Lofton	Cleveland Indians; Atlanta Braves; San Francisco Giants; Chicago Cubs; New York Yankees; Los Angeles Dodgers	392
8	Alex Bregman	Houston Astros; Boston Red Sox	384
9	Yadier Molina	St. Louis Cardinals	373
10	Mookie Betts	Boston Red Sox; Los Angeles Dodgers	363

=== Games played ===
#	Player	Team(s)	Games played
1	Derek Jeter	New York Yankees	158
2	Jorge Posada	New York Yankees	125
3	Bernie Williams	New York Yankees	121
4	David Justice	Atlanta Braves; Cleveland Indians; New York Yankees; Oakland Athletics	112
5	Manny Ramirez	Cleveland Indians; Boston Red Sox; Los Angeles Dodgers	111
6	Jose Altuve	Houston Astros	107
7	Yadier Molina	St. Louis Cardinals	104
8	Alex Bregman	Houston Astros; Boston Red Sox	103
	Kiké Hernández	Los Angeles Dodgers; Boston Red Sox	103
10	Tino Martinez	Seattle Mariners; New York Yankees; St. Louis Cardinals	99

=== Hits ===
#	Player	Team(s)	Hits
1	Derek Jeter	New York Yankees	200
2	Bernie Williams	New York Yankees	128
3	Jose Altuve	Houston Astros	120
4	Manny Ramirez	Cleveland Indians; Boston Red Sox; Los Angeles Dodgers	117
5	Jorge Posada	New York Yankees	103
6	Yadier Molina	St. Louis Cardinals	102
7	Kenny Lofton	Cleveland Indians; Atlanta Braves; San Francisco Giants; Chicago Cubs; New York Yankees; Los Angeles Dodgers	97
	Chipper Jones	Atlanta Braves	97
	Albert Pujols	St. Louis Cardinals; Los Angeles Angels; Los Angeles Dodgers	97
10	George Springer	Houston Astros; Toronto Blue Jays	93

==== Singles ====
#	Player	Team(s)	Singles
1	Derek Jeter	New York Yankees	143
2	Yadier Molina	St. Louis Cardinals	79
3	Bernie Williams	New York Yankees	77
4	Kenny Lofton	Cleveland Indians; Atlanta Braves; San Francisco Giants; Chicago Cubs; New York Yankees; Los Angeles Dodgers	74
5	Jose Altuve	Houston Astros	71
6	Manny Ramirez	Cleveland Indians; Boston Red Sox; Los Angeles Dodgers	69
7	Jorge Posada	New York Yankees	68
8	Yuli Gurriel	Houston Astros; Miami Marlins; Kansas City Royals	67
9	Pete Rose	Cincinnati Reds; Philadelphia Phillies	66
	Chipper Jones	Atlanta Braves	66

==== Doubles ====
#	Player	Team(s)	Doubles
1	Derek Jeter	New York Yankees	32
2	Bernie Williams	New York Yankees	29
3	Mookie Betts	Boston Red Sox; Los Angeles Dodgers	26
4	Jorge Posada	New York Yankees	23
5	David Ortiz	Boston Red Sox	22
6	Jose Altuve	Houston Astros	21
	George Springer	Houston Astros; Toronto Blue Jays	21
8	Carlos Correa	Houston Astros; Minnesota Twins	19
	Justin Turner	Los Angeles Dodgers; Chicago Cubs	19
	Yadier Molina	St. Louis Cardinals	19
	Manny Ramirez	Cleveland Indians; Boston Red Sox; Los Angeles Dodgers	19

==== Triples ====
#	Player	Team(s)	Triples
1	George Brett	Kansas City Royals	5
	Rafael Furcal	Atlanta Braves; Los Angeles Dodgers; St. Louis Cardinals	5
	Derek Jeter	New York Yankees	5
4	Billy Johnson	New York Yankees	4
	Tommy Leach	Pittsburgh Pirates	4
	Tris Speaker	Boston Red Sox; Cleveland Indians	4
	Mariano Duncan	Los Angeles Dodgers; Cincinnati Reds; Philadelphia Phillies; Cincinnati Reds; New York Yankees	4
	Devon White	California Angels; Toronto Blue Jays; Florida Marlins	4
	Rickey Henderson	Oakland Athletics; Toronto Blue Jays; San Diego Padres; New York Mets; Seattle Mariners	4
	Omar Vizquel	Cleveland Indians	4
	Kenny Lofton	Cleveland Indians; Atlanta Braves; San Francisco Giants; Chicago Cubs; New York Yankees; Los Angeles Dodgers	4

==== Home runs ====
#	Player	Team(s)	Home runs
1	Manny Ramirez	Cleveland Indians; Boston Red Sox; Los Angeles Dodgers	29
2	Jose Altuve	Houston Astros	28
3	Kyle Schwarber	Chicago Cubs; Boston Red Sox; Philadelphia Phillies	24
4	George Springer	Houston Astros; Toronto Blue Jays	23
5	Bernie Williams	New York Yankees	22
6	Derek Jeter	New York Yankees	20
7	Corey Seager	Los Angeles Dodgers; Texas Rangers	19
	Albert Pujols	St. Louis Cardinals; Los Angeles Angels; Los Angeles Dodgers	19
	Alex Bregman	Houston Astros; Boston Red Sox	19
10	Giancarlo Stanton	New York Yankees	18
	Nelson Cruz	Texas Rangers; Baltimore Orioles; Minnesota Twins; Tampa Bay Rays	18
	Mickey Mantle	New York Yankees	18
	Reggie Jackson	Oakland Athletics; New York Yankees; California Angels	18
	Carlos Correa	Houston Astros; Minnesota Twins	18
	Bryce Harper	Washington Nationals; Philadelphia Phillies	18

=== Runs batted in ===
#	Player	Team(s)	RBIs
1	Bernie Williams	New York Yankees	80
2	Manny Ramirez	Cleveland Indians; Boston Red Sox; Los Angeles Dodgers	78
3	Carlos Correa	Houston Astros; Minnesota Twins	63
	David Justice	Atlanta Braves; Cleveland Indians; New York Yankees; Oakland Athletics	63
5	David Ortiz	Boston Red Sox	61
	Derek Jeter	New York Yankees	61
7	Jose Altuve	Houston Astros	57
8	Albert Pujols	St. Louis Cardinals; Los Angeles Angels; Los Angeles Dodgers	54
	Alex Bregman	Houston Astros; Boston Red Sox	54
10	Reggie Jackson	Oakland Athletics; New York Yankees; California Angels	48
	Corey Seager	Los Angeles Dodgers; Texas Rangers	48
	George Springer	Houston Astros; Toronto Blue Jays	48

=== Runs scored ===
#	Player	Team(s)	Runs scored
1	Derek Jeter	New York Yankees	111
2	Jose Altuve	Houston Astros	90
3	Bernie Williams	New York Yankees	83
4	Manny Ramirez	Cleveland Indians; Boston Red Sox; Los Angeles Dodgers	67
5	Kenny Lofton	Cleveland Indians; Atlanta Braves; San Francisco Giants; Chicago Cubs; New York Yankees; Los Angeles Dodgers	65
6	Alex Bregman	Houston Astros; Boston Red Sox	63
7	Mookie Betts	Boston Red Sox; Los Angeles Dodgers	58
	Chipper Jones	Atlanta Braves	58
9	George Springer	Houston Astros; Toronto Blue Jays	57
	Albert Pujols	St. Louis Cardinals; Los Angeles Angels; Los Angeles Dodgers	57

=== Total bases ===
#	Player	Team(s)	TB
1	Derek Jeter	New York Yankees	302
2	Jose Altuve	Houston Astros	225
3	Manny Ramirez	Cleveland Indians; Boston Red Sox; Los Angeles Dodgers	223
	Bernie Williams	New York Yankees	223
5	George Springer	Houston Astros; Toronto Blue Jays	183
6	Albert Pujols	St. Louis Cardinals; Los Angeles Angels; Los Angeles Dodgers	174
7	Alex Bregman	Houston Astros; Boston Red Sox	168
8	David Ortiz	Boston Red Sox	165
9	Carlos Correa	Houston Astros; Minnesota Twins	164
10	Jorge Posada	New York Yankees	161

=== Base on balls ===
#	Player	Team(s)	Base on balls
1	Chipper Jones	Atlanta Braves	72
	Manny Ramirez	Cleveland Indians; Boston Red Sox; Los Angeles Dodgers	72
3	Bernie Williams	New York Yankees	71
4	Jorge Posada	New York Yankees	70
5	Derek Jeter	New York Yankees	66
6	Max Muncy	Los Angeles Dodgers	65
7	David Justice	Atlanta Braves; Cleveland Indians; New York Yankees; Oakland Athletics	64
8	David Ortiz	Boston Red Sox	59
9	Alex Bregman	Houston Astros; Boston Red Sox	56
10	Barry Bonds	Pittsburgh Pirates; San Francisco Giants	52

=== Strikeouts ===
#	Player	Team(s)	Ks
1	Derek Jeter	New York Yankees	135
2	Jorge Posada	New York Yankees	109
3	Max Muncy	Los Angeles Dodgers	93
4	Cody Bellinger	Los Angeles Dodgers; New York Yankees	92
5	Manny Ramirez	Cleveland Indians; Boston Red Sox; Los Angeles Dodgers	91
	George Springer	Houston Astros; Toronto Blue Jays	91
	Aaron Judge	New York Yankees	91
8	Bernie Williams	New York Yankees	85
9	Carlos Correa	Houston Astros; Minnesota Twins	84
10	Kyle Schwarber	Chicago Cubs; Boston Red Sox; Philadelphia Phillies	83

=== Stolen bases ===
#	Player	Team(s)	Stolen bases
1	Kenny Lofton	Cleveland Indians; Atlanta Braves; San Francisco Giants; Chicago Cubs; New York Yankees; Los Angeles Dodgers	34
2	Rickey Henderson	Oakland Athletics; Toronto Blue Jays; San Diego Padres; New York Mets; Seattle Mariners	33
3	Omar Vizquel	Cleveland Indians	23
4	Roberto Alomar	Toronto Blue Jays; Baltimore Orioles; Cleveland Indians	20
5	Davey Lopes	Los Angeles Dodgers; Chicago Cubs; Houston Astros	19
6	Derek Jeter	New York Yankees	18
7	Mookie Betts	Boston Red Sox; Los Angeles Dodgers	16
8	Joe Morgan	Cincinnati Reds; Houston Astros; Philadelphia Phillies	15
9	Lou Brock	St. Louis Cardinals	14
	Eddie Collins	Philadelphia Athletics; Chicago White Sox	14
	Cody Bellinger	Los Angeles Dodgers; New York Yankees	14
	Trea Turner	Washington Nationals; Los Angeles Dodgers; Philadelphia Phillies	14

=== Hit by pitch ===
#	Player	Team(s)	HBP	Games played
1	Justin Turner	Los Angeles Dodgers; Chicago Cubs	13	88
2	Shane Victorino	Philadelphia Phillies; Boston Red Sox	11	60
3	Russell Martin	Los Angeles Dodgers; New York Yankees; Pittsburgh Pirates; Toronto Blue Jays	9	58
	Anthony Rizzo	Chicago Cubs; New York Yankees	9	59
	Alex Rodriguez	Seattle Mariners; New York Yankees	9	76
	Alex Bregman	Houston Astros; Boston Red Sox	9	99
7	Jon Jay	St. Louis Cardinals; Chicago Cubs	8	67
	Chase Utley	Philadelphia Phillies; Los Angeles Dodgers	8	68
9	David Eckstein	Anaheim Angels; St. Louis Cardinals	7	44
	Martín Maldonado	Houston Astros	7	65

== Pitching ==
=== Earned run average ===
Minimum 35 innings pitched
#	Player	Team(s)	ERA	IP
1	Mariano Rivera	New York Yankees	0.70	141
2	Andrew Miller	Baltimore Orioles; New York Yankees; Cleveland Indians; St. Louis Cardinals	0.93	38 2/3
3	Sandy Koufax	Los Angeles Dodgers	0.95	57
4	Christy Mathewson	New York Giants	0.97	101 2/3
5	Monte Pearson	New York Yankees	1.01	35 2/3
6	Blue Moon Odom	Oakland Athletics	1.13	39 2/3
7	Ian Anderson	Atlanta Braves	1.26	35 2/3
8	Eddie Plank	Philadelphia Athletics	1.32	54 2/3
9	Bill Hallahan	St. Louis Cardinals	1.36	39 2/3
10	Ranger Suárez	Philadelphia Phillies	1.48	42 2/3

=== Walks and hits per inning pitched ===
Minimum 35 innings pitched
#	Player	Team(s)	WHIP	IP
1	Zack Wheeler	Philadelphia Phillies	0.725	70 1/3
2	Monte Pearson	New York Yankees	0.729	35 2/3
3	Tarik Skubal	Detroit Tigers	0.731	39 2/3
4	Roy Halladay	Philadelphia Phillies	0.737	38
5	Mariano Rivera	New York Yankees	0.759	141
6	Kenley Jansen	Los Angeles Dodgers; Atlanta Braves	0.796	65 1/3
7	Sandy Koufax	Los Angeles Dodgers	0.825	57
8	Marco Estrada	Milwaukee Brewers; Toronto Blue Jays	0.839	47 2/3
9	Christy Mathewson	New York Giants	0.846	101 2/3
10	Herb Pennock	Philadelphia Athletics; New York Yankees	0.849	55 1/3

=== Wins ===
#	Player	Team(s)	W
1	Andy Pettitte	New York Yankees; Houston Astros	19
2	Justin Verlander	Detroit Tigers; Houston Astros	17
3	John Smoltz	Atlanta Braves; St. Louis Cardinals	15
4	Tom Glavine	Atlanta Braves; New York Mets	14
5	Clayton Kershaw	Los Angeles Dodgers	13
6	Roger Clemens	Boston Red Sox; New York Yankees; Houston Astros	12
7	Greg Maddux	Chicago Cubs; Atlanta Braves; Los Angeles Dodgers	11
	Gerrit Cole	Pittsburgh Pirates; Houston Astros; New York Yankees	11
	Curt Schilling	Philadelphia Phillies; Arizona Diamondbacks; Boston Red Sox	11
10	Chris Carpenter	St. Louis Cardinals	10
	CC Sabathia	Cleveland Indians; Milwaukee Brewers; New York Yankees	10
	David Wells	Toronto Blue Jays; Cincinnati Reds; New York Yankees; Boston Red Sox; San Diego Padres	10
	Dave Stewart	Los Angeles Dodgers; Oakland Athletics; Toronto Blue Jays	10
	Whitey Ford	New York Yankees	10

=== Losses ===
#	Player	Team(s)	L
1	Tom Glavine	Atlanta Braves; New York Mets	16
2	Greg Maddux	Chicago Cubs; Atlanta Braves; Los Angeles Dodgers	14
3	Clayton Kershaw	Los Angeles Dodgers	13
4	Justin Verlander	Detroit Tigers; Houston Astros	12
5	Andy Pettitte	New York Yankees; Houston Astros	11
6	David Price	Tampa Bay Rays; Detroit Tigers; Toronto Blue Jays; Boston Red Sox	9
	Randy Johnson	Seattle Mariners; Houston Astros; Arizona Diamondbacks; New York Yankees	9
8	Max Scherzer	Detroit Tigers; Washington Nationals; Los Angeles Dodgers; New York Mets; Texas Rangers; Toronto Blue Jays	8
	Mike Mussina	Baltimore Orioles; New York Yankees	8
	Roger Clemens	Boston Red Sox; New York Yankees; Houston Astros	8
	Jerry Reuss	Pittsburgh Pirates; Los Angeles Dodgers	8
	Whitey Ford	New York Yankees	8

=== Innings pitched ===
#	Player	Team(s)	IP
1	Andy Pettitte	New York Yankees; Houston Astros	276 2/3
2	Justin Verlander	Detroit Tigers; Houston Astros	226
3	Tom Glavine	Atlanta Braves; New York Mets	218 1/3
4	John Smoltz	Atlanta Braves; St. Louis Cardinals	209
5	Roger Clemens	Boston Red Sox; New York Yankees; Houston Astros	199
6	Greg Maddux	Chicago Cubs; Atlanta Braves; Los Angeles Dodgers	198
7	Clayton Kershaw	Los Angeles Dodgers	196 2/3
8	Max Scherzer	Detroit Tigers; Washington Nationals; Los Angeles Dodgers; New York Mets; Texas Rangers; Toronto Blue Jays	156 1/3
9	Jon Lester	Boston Red Sox; Oakland Athletics; Chicago Cubs	154
10	Whitey Ford	New York Yankees	146

=== Games started ===
#	Player	Team(s)	Games started
1	Andy Pettitte	New York Yankees; Houston Astros	44
2	Justin Verlander	Detroit Tigers; Houston Astros	37
3	Tom Glavine	Atlanta Braves; New York Mets	35
4	Roger Clemens	Boston Red Sox; New York Yankees; Houston Astros	34
5	Clayton Kershaw	Los Angeles Dodgers	32
6	Greg Maddux	Chicago Cubs; Atlanta Braves; Los Angeles Dodgers	30
7	Max Scherzer	Detroit Tigers; Washington Nationals; Los Angeles Dodgers; New York Mets; Texas Rangers	28
8	John Smoltz	Atlanta Braves; St. Louis Cardinals	27
9	John Lackey	Anaheim / Los Angeles Angels; Boston Red Sox; St. Louis Cardinals; Chicago Cubs	23
	CC Sabathia	Cleveland Indians; Milwaukee Brewers; New York Yankees	23

=== Games pitched ===
#	Player	Team(s)	Games pitched
1	Mariano Rivera	New York Yankees	96
2	Kenley Jansen	Los Angeles Dodgers; Atlanta Braves	59
3	Ryan Madson	Philadelphia Phillies; Kansas City Royals; Washington Nationals; Los Angeles Dodgers	57
4	Jeff Nelson	Seattle Mariners; New York Yankees	55
5	Mike Stanton	Atlanta Braves; Boston Red Sox; Texas Rangers; New York Yankees	53
6	Ryan Pressly	Houston Astros	47
7	Mike Timlin	Toronto Blue Jays; Seattle Mariners; St. Louis Cardinals; Boston Red Sox	46
	Aroldis Chapman	Cincinnati Reds; Chicago Cubs; New York Yankees; Texas Rangers; Boston Red Sox	46
9	Andy Pettitte	New York Yankees; Houston Astros	44
10	David Robertson	New York Yankees; Tampa Bay Rays; Philadelphia Phillies; Miami Marlins	43
	Blake Treinen	Washington Nationals; Oakland Athletics; Los Angeles Dodgers	43

=== Complete games ===
#	Player	Team(s)	CG
1	Christy Mathewson	New York Giants	10
2	Chief Bender	Philadelphia Athletics	9
3	Red Ruffing	New York Yankees	8
	Bob Gibson	St. Louis Cardinals	8
5	Whitey Ford	New York Yankees	7
6	Jim Palmer	Baltimore Orioles	6
	Dave McNally	Baltimore Orioles	6
	Waite Hoyt	New York Yankees; Philadelphia Athletics	6
	Art Nehf	New York Giants; Chicago Cubs	6
	George Mullin	Detroit Tigers	6
	Eddie Plank	Philadelphia Athletics	6

=== Shutouts ===
#	Player	Team(s)	SO
1	Christy Mathewson	New York Giants	4
2	Whitey Ford	New York Yankees	3
	Madison Bumgarner	San Francisco Giants	3
	Josh Beckett	Florida Marlins; Boston Red Sox	3
	Mordecai Brown	Chicago Cubs	3
6	Curt Schilling	Philadelphia Phillies; Arizona Diamondbacks; Boston Red Sox	2
	Orel Hershiser	Los Angeles Dodgers; Cleveland Indians; New York Mets	2
	Jim Palmer	Baltimore Orioles	2
	Randy Johnson	Seattle Mariners; Houston Astros; Arizona Diamondbacks; New York Yankees	2
	Dave McNally	Baltimore Orioles	2
	Bob Gibson	St. Louis Cardinals	2
	Art Nehf	New York Giants; Chicago Cubs	2
	Allie Reynolds	New York Yankees	2
	Sandy Koufax	Los Angeles Dodgers	2
	Scott McGregor	Baltimore Orioles	2
	Lew Burdette	Milwaukee Braves	2
	Bill Hallahan	St. Louis Cardinals	2
	Bill Dinneen	Boston Americans	2

=== Saves ===
#	Player	Team(s)	Saves
1	Mariano Rivera	New York Yankees	42
2	Kenley Jansen	Los Angeles Dodgers; Atlanta Braves	20
3	Brad Lidge	Houston Astros; Philadelphia Phillies	18
4	Dennis Eckersley	Chicago Cubs; Oakland Athletics; St. Louis Cardinals; Boston Red Sox	15
5	Ryan Pressly	Houston Astros	14
6	Aroldis Chapman	Cincinnati Reds; Chicago Cubs; New York Yankees; Texas Rangers; Boston Red Sox	11
	Jason Isringhausen	Oakland Athletics; St. Louis Cardinals	11
	Robb Nen	Florida Marlins; San Francisco Giants	11
9	Craig Kimbrel	Atlanta Braves; Boston Red Sox; Chicago Cubs; Chicago White Sox; Philadelphia Phillies	10
10	Rollie Fingers	Oakland Athletics; Milwaukee Brewers	9
	Mark Wohlers	Atlanta Braves; New York Yankees	9

=== Strikeouts ===
#	Player	Team(s)	Strikeouts
1	Justin Verlander	Detroit Tigers; Houston Astros	244
2	Clayton Kershaw	Los Angeles Dodgers	213
3	John Smoltz	Atlanta Braves; St. Louis Cardinals	199
4	Andy Pettitte	New York Yankees; Houston Astros	183
5	Max Scherzer	Detroit Tigers; Washington Nationals; Los Angeles Dodgers; New York Mets; Texas Rangers; Toronto Blue Jays	182
6	Roger Clemens	Boston Red Sox; New York Yankees; Houston Astros	173
7	Gerrit Cole	Pittsburgh Pirates; Houston Astros; New York Yankees	156
8	Mike Mussina	Baltimore Orioles; New York Yankees	145
9	Tom Glavine	Atlanta Braves; New York Mets	143
10	Jon Lester	Boston Red Sox; Oakland Athletics; Chicago Cubs	133

=== Base on balls ===
#	Player	Team(s)	Base on balls
1	Tom Glavine	Atlanta Braves; New York Mets	87
2	Andy Pettitte	New York Yankees; Houston Astros	76
3	Justin Verlander	Detroit Tigers; Houston Astros	74
4	Roger Clemens	Boston Red Sox; New York Yankees; Houston Astros	70
5	John Smoltz	Atlanta Braves; St. Louis Cardinals	67
6	CC Sabathia	Cleveland Indians; Milwaukee Brewers; New York Yankees	63
7	Max Scherzer	Detroit Tigers; Washington Nationals; Los Angeles Dodgers; New York Mets; Texas Rangers; Toronto Blue Jays	62
8	David Cone	New York Mets; Toronto Blue Jays; New York Yankees	58
9	Orlando Hernandez	New York Yankees; Chicago White Sox	55
10	Clayton Kershaw	Los Angeles Dodgers	54

=== Hits allowed ===
#	Player	Team(s)	Hits allowed
1	Andy Pettitte	New York Yankees; Houston Astros	285
2	Greg Maddux	Chicago Cubs; Atlanta Braves; Los Angeles Dodgers	195
3	Tom Glavine	Atlanta Braves; New York Mets	191
4	Justin Verlander	Detroit Tigers; Houston Astros	179
5	Roger Clemens	Boston Red Sox; New York Yankees; Houston Astros	173
6	John Smoltz	Atlanta Braves; St. Louis Cardinals	172
7	Clayton Kershaw	Los Angeles Dodgers	171
8	CC Sabathia	Cleveland Indians; Milwaukee Brewers; New York Yankees	137
9	John Lackey	Anaheim / Los Angeles Angels; Boston Red Sox; St. Louis Cardinals; Chicago Cubs	135
10	Whitey Ford	New York Yankees	132

=== Home runs allowed ===
#	Player	Team(s)	Home runs allowed
1	Justin Verlander	Detroit Tigers; Houston Astros	32
	Clayton Kershaw	Los Angeles Dodgers	32
3	Andy Pettitte	New York Yankees; Houston Astros	31
4	Tom Glavine	Atlanta Braves; New York Mets	21
5	Catfish Hunter	Oakland Athletics; New York Yankees	21
6	Max Scherzer	Detroit Tigers; Washington Nationals; Los Angeles Dodgers; New York Mets; Texas Rangers	20
7	Gerrit Cole	Pittsburgh Pirates; Houston Astros; New York Yankees	19
	Zack Greinke	Milwaukee Brewers; Los Angeles Dodgers; Arizona Diamondbacks; Houston Astros	19
	Mike Mussina	Baltimore Orioles; New York Yankees	19
10	Yu Darvish	Texas Rangers; Los Angeles Dodgers; Chicago Cubs; San Diego Padres	18

=== Hit batsmen ===
#	Player	Team(s)	HBP	Games pitched
1	Lance McCullers Jr.	Houston Astros	10	19
2	Tim Wakefield	Pittsburgh Pirates; Boston Red Sox	9	18
	Max Scherzer	Detroit Tigers; Washington Nationals; Los Angeles Dodgers; New York Mets; Texas Rangers	9	30
	Greg Maddux	Chicago Cubs; Atlanta Braves; Los Angeles Dodgers	9	35
5	Yu Darvish	Texas Rangers; Los Angeles Dodgers; Chicago Cubs; San Diego Padres	8	14
5	Pedro Martinez	Boston Red Sox; Philadelphia Phillies	8	16
	CC Sabathia	Cleveland Indians; Milwaukee Brewers; New York Yankees	8	26
8	A. J. Burnett	New York Yankees; Pittsburgh Pirates	7	8
	Charlie Morton	Pittsburgh Pirates; Houston Astros; Tampa Bay Rays; Atlanta Braves	7	18
	David Wells	Toronto Blue Jays; Cincinnati Reds; New York Yankees; Boston Red Sox; San Diego Padres	7	27
	Tom Glavine	Atlanta Braves; New York Mets	7	35

=== Wild pitches ===
#	Player	Team(s)	WP	Games pitched
1	Clayton Kershaw	Los Angeles Dodgers	11	41
2	Roger Clemens	Boston Red Sox; New York Yankees; Houston Astros	10	21
	John Lackey	Anaheim / Los Angeles Angels; Boston Red Sox; St. Louis Cardinals; Chicago Cubs	10	29
4	Rick Ankiel	St. Louis Cardinals	9	3
	Jack Morris	Detroit Tigers; Minnesota Twins; Toronto Blue Jays	9	13
	Justin Verlander	Detroit Tigers; Houston Astros	9	38
7	Max Scherzer	Detroit Tigers; Washington Nationals; Los Angeles Dodgers; New York Mets; Texas Rangers; Toronto Blue Jays	8	30
8	Tyler Glasnow	Tampa Bay Rays; Los Angeles Dodgers	7	16
	Ryan Pressly	Houston Astros	7	47
10	James Shields	Tampa Bay Rays; Kansas City Royals	6	11
	Steve Carlton	St. Louis Cardinals; Philadelphia Phillies	6	16
	Jim Palmer	Baltimore Orioles	6	17
	David Cone	New York Mets; Toronto Blue Jays; New York Yankees	6	21
	Orel Hershiser	Los Angeles Dodgers; Cleveland Indians; New York Mets	6	22
	Joe Kelly	St. Louis Cardinals; Boston Red Sox; Los Angeles Dodgers	6	41
	John Smoltz	Atlanta Braves; St. Louis Cardinals	6	41
