= 2026 Major League Baseball Home Run Derby =

Baseball competition

- Date: July 13, 2026
- Venue: Citizens Bank Park
- City: Philadelphia, Pennsylvania
- Winner: Jordan Walker
- Score: 12–11

The 2026 Major League Baseball Home Run Derby was a home run hitting contest between eight batters from Major League Baseball (MLB). The derby was held on July 13, 2026, at Citizens Bank Park in Philadelphia, Pennsylvania, the site of the 2026 MLB All-Star Game. This was the first year that the event aired on Netflix. The event was won by Jordan Walker of the St. Louis Cardinals.

== Rules ==
Starting this year, MLB has eliminated the use of "outs" and the round timer. In every round, the contestants are only limited by the allotted amount of swings in each round. There is no longer a designated bonus round. Instead, if a contestant's final swing of the round is a home run, they are allowed to keep swinging until they fail to record a home run.

=== Round one ===
The contestants are allowed 20 swings to hit as many home runs as possible. Ties in this round are broken by the distance of each contestant's longest home run. The top four contestants advance to the next round.

=== Round two ===
The contestants are seeded based on their performance in the previous round (1 vs 4, 2 vs 3). The lower seed in each matchup hits first.

In this round, the swing limit is reduced to 15 swings. If there is a tie, the contestants will engage in successive three-swing swing-offs until there is a winner. The winners of each matchup advance to the finals.

=== Finals ===
In the final round, the rules remain the same as in round two. The contestant with the most home runs is declared champion.

== Results ==
Citizens Bank Park, Philadelphia
Player	Team	Round one	Round two	Finals	Total
Jordan Walker	St. Louis Cardinals	13*	6	12	31
Kyle Schwarber	Philadelphia Phillies	10	9	11	30
Willson Contreras	Boston Red Sox	13*	8	−	21
Junior Caminero	Tampa Bay Rays	12	5	−	17
Munetaka Murakami	Chicago White Sox	9	−	−	9
Bryce Harper	Philadelphia Phillies	8	−	−	8
Jac Caglianone	Kansas City Royals	8	−	−	8
Ben Rice	New York Yankees	7	−	−	7

* − Contreras received the higher seed via distance tiebreaker (490 ft to 470 ft)

Round two
1	Willson Contreras	8
4	Kyle Schwarber	9
2	Jordan Walker	6
3	Junior Caminero	5

Finals
4	Kyle Schwarber	11
2	Jordan Walker	12
