= Kyle Schwarber =

American baseball player (born 1993)

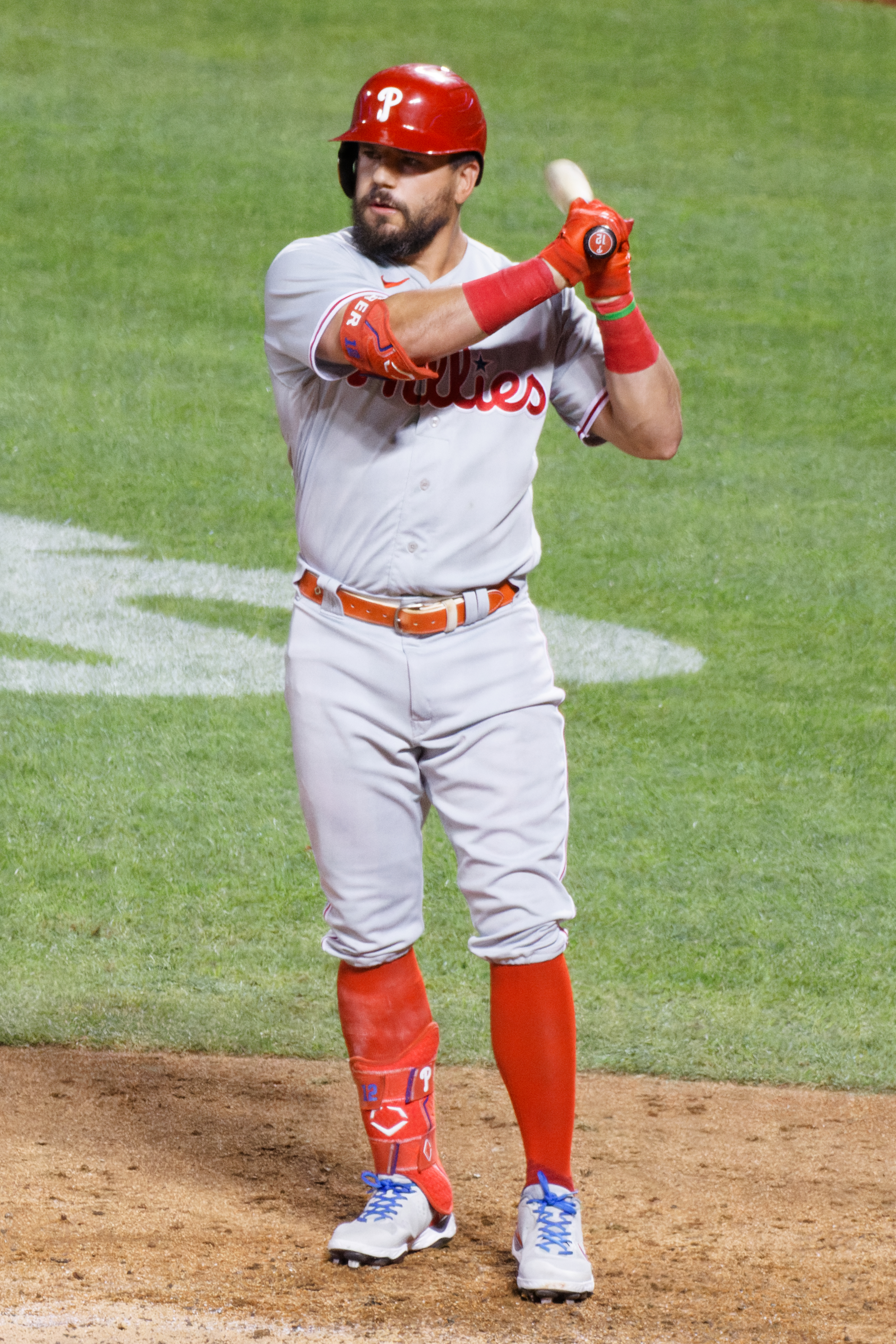
- Schwarber with the Philadelphia Phillies in 2022

Philadelphia Phillies – No. 12
- Left fielder / Designated hitter
- Born: March 5, 1993 (age 33); Middletown, Ohio, U.S.
- Bats: Left Throws: Right

MLB debut
- June 16, 2015, for the Chicago Cubs

MLB statistics (through 2026 season)
- Batting average: .231
- Home runs: 385
- Runs batted in: 881
- Stats at Baseball Reference

Teams
- Chicago Cubs (2015–2020); Washington Nationals (2021); Boston Red Sox (2021); Philadelphia Phillies (2022–present)

Career highlights and awards
- 4× All-Star (2021, 2022, 2025, 2026); World Series champion (2016); 2× Silver Slugger Award (2022, 2026); 3× NL home run leader (2022, 2025, 2026 (Note: Tied with Pete Crow-Armstrong)); MLB RBI leader (2025); Hit four home runs in one game on August 28, 2025
Medals
Men's baseball
Representing United States
World Baseball Classic
| Silver medal – second place | 2023 Miami | Team |
| Silver medal – second place | 2026 Miami | Team |

Kyle Joseph Schwarber (born March 5, 1993) is an American professional baseball left fielder and designated hitter for the Philadelphia Phillies of Major League Baseball (MLB). He has previously played in MLB for the Chicago Cubs, Washington Nationals, and Boston Red Sox. Schwarber also plays for the United States national baseball team in international play.

Schwarber played college baseball for the Indiana Hoosiers and was selected by the Cubs in the first round of the 2014 MLB draft. He made his MLB debut with the Cubs in 2015 and was a member of the Cubs’ 2016 World Series championship team. In 2021, Schwarber signed with the Nationals and was later traded to the Red Sox; he also made his first All-Star appearance.

Schwarber signed with the Phillies in 2022. He led the National League in home runs that season, earned his second All-Star appearance and his first Silver Slugger Award, and played with the Phillies during the 2022 World Series. Schwarber was again named an All-Star in 2025, winning the game's MVP Award. Following the 2025 postseason, he holds the all-time records for most National League Championship Series home runs (11), most postseason home runs by a left-handed batter (23), and most postseason leadoff home runs (5). His 23 postseason home runs are also tied with George Springer for the third most in MLB history. Known for his powerful, hard-hit home runs and high walk rate in contrast to his low batting average. On August 28, 2025, Schwarber became the 21st player in MLB history to hit four home runs in one game. In 2026, Schwarber was named to his fourth All-Star Game.

== Early life ==
Schwarber attended Middletown High School in Middletown, Ohio. During his four years, he batted .408 with 18 home runs and 103 runs batted in (RBIs). Schwarber was also a standout football player at Middletown, garnering Second Team All-Ohio Honors as a linebacker his senior year.

== College career ==
Schwarber enrolled at Indiana University Bloomington to play college baseball for the Indiana Hoosiers. As a freshman in 2012, Schwarber was named a freshman All-American by Louisville Slugger and Collegiate Baseball Newspaper after hitting .300/.390/.513 with eight home runs and 47 RBIs. As a sophomore in 2013, he hit .366/.456/.647 with 18 home runs and 54 RBIs in 61 games. He was named a first-team All-American by the National Collegiate Baseball Writers Association (NCBWA) After the season, Schwarber played for the United States collegiate national team during the summer. As a junior, he batted .348/.456/.643 with 13 home runs. He was a finalist for the Johnny Bench Award. He majored in recreational sports management.

In the 2012 college offseason, Schwarber played for the Wareham Gatemen of the Cape Cod Baseball League (CCBL). After winning the league championship with the Gatemen, Schwarber was awarded the playoff's most valuable player award. In June 2019, it was announced that he would join the CCBL Hall of Fame class of 2019.

== Professional career ==
=== Draft and minor leagues ===
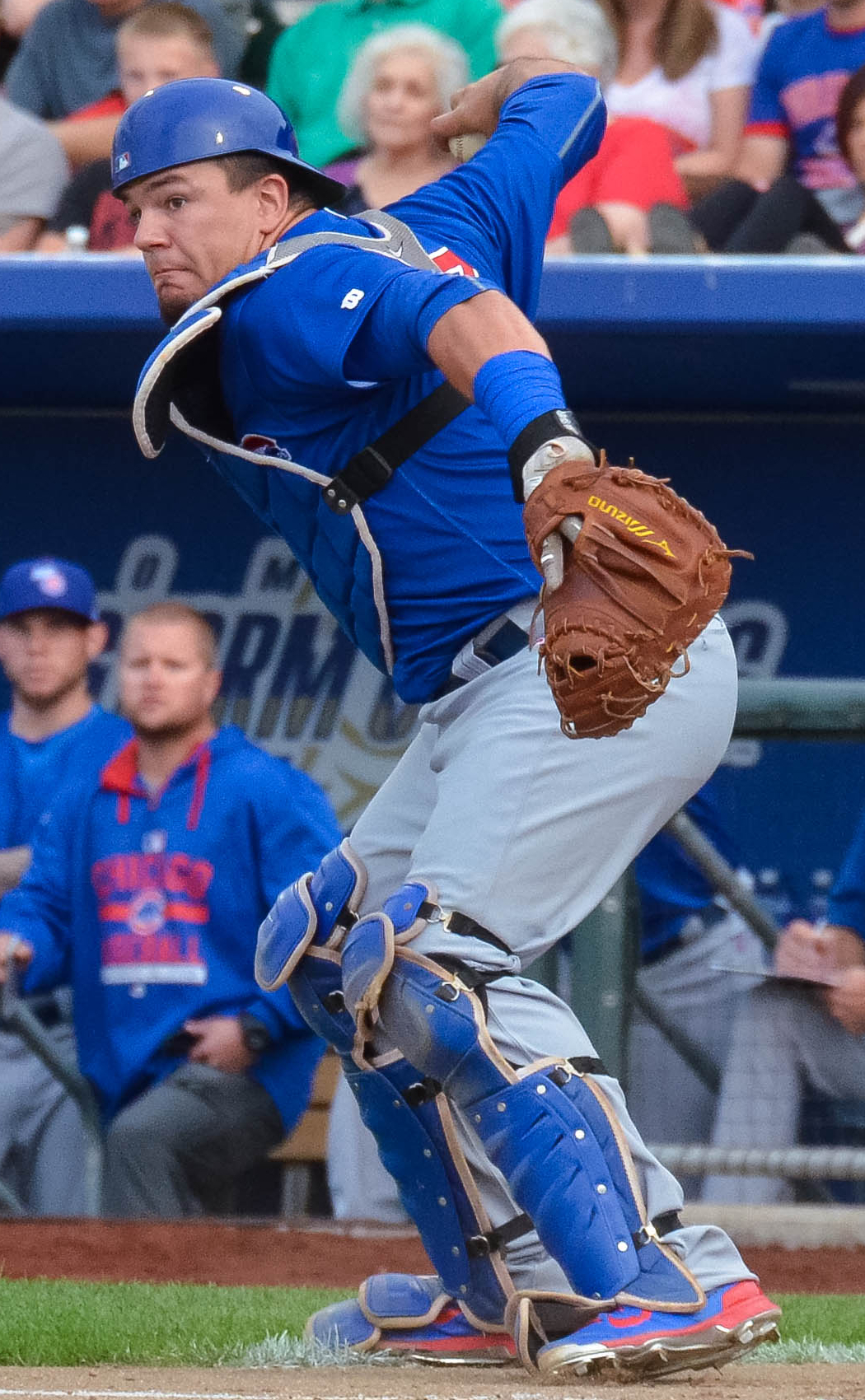
Schwarber playing at catcher for the Iowa Cubs in 2015

Schwarber was drafted by the Chicago Cubs in the first round, fourth overall, in the 2014 Major League Baseball draft. He signed on June 11. Upon being drafted, MLB.com analyst Bernie Pleskoff profiled Schwarber as a "game-changing" power-hitter. However, Pleskoff was critical of his base-running and fielding skills, commenting, "Schwarber is sluggish on the bases and slow defensively." ESPN's Keith Law echoed a similar sentiment in his draft profile, noting, "Schwarber might have the most raw power of any prospect in the class." Two pre-draft scouting reports by the MLB Scouting Bureau compared Schwarber's swinging mechanics to those of Jeff Bagwell, while also projecting him to play a role similar to Matt Stairs.

He made his professional debut with the Boise Hawks three days later, going 3-for-4 with a home run and three RBI. The Cubs then promoted him to the Kane County Cougars of the Class A Midwest League and the Daytona Cubs of the Class A-Advanced Florida State League before the end of the season. In 72 total games between the three teams, he slashed .344/.428/.634 with 18 home runs, 53 RBI, and 18 doubles.

Schwarber began the 2015 season with the Double-A Tennessee Smokies of the Southern League. In July 2015, he played in the All-Star Futures Game, where he was named the MVP of the game after hitting a go-ahead two-run triple for Team USA.

=== Chicago Cubs (2015–2020) ===
==== 2015 ====
The Cubs promoted Schwarber to the major leagues on June 16, 2015, to serve as a designated hitter for six games during interleague play. Schwarber made his major league debut as a position player that night, replacing ejected starting catcher Miguel Montero in the eighth inning against the Cleveland Indians at Wrigley Field. The following night, as a designated hitter, he got four hits in five at bats with two RBI and six total bases after the Cubs and Indians both traveled to Cleveland. The Cubs sent Schwarber to the Triple-A Iowa Cubs of the Pacific Coast League after the six games. On July 16, 2015, Schwarber was recalled from Triple A Iowa, to rejoin the Cubs due to an injury to catcher Montero. On July 21, in a 5–4 extra-inning victory over the Cincinnati Reds, Schwarber hit a game-tying two-run homer in the ninth inning and a solo go-ahead home run in the top of the 13th to give the Cubs the lead. Over the course of the season he split time between catcher and outfield positions. He finished the 2015 regular season having played 69 games, recording a .246 batting average with 16 home runs, 52 runs scored, and 43 RBI in just 273 plate appearances. In the National League Wild Card Game, Schwarber drove in three runs and hit a long two-run home run to help the Cubs defeat the Pittsburgh Pirates, 4–0, and advance to the Division Series against the St. Louis Cardinals. In the NLDS, Schwarber helped the Cubs to a 3–1 series victory with two home runs, including a mammoth Game 4 homer that landed on top of the new Wrigley Field scoreboard in right field. The ball was removed during the 2015–16 off-season to prevent theft but was encased in Plexiglas and returned "to where it landed". In his eighth career postseason game, a 5–2 loss to the New York Mets in Game 3 of the 2015 National League Championship Series (NLCS), Schwarber set a Cubs record with his fifth career postseason home run and also the record for the most home runs in a single postseason by a player age 22 or younger, passing Miguel Cabrera.

==== 2016 ====
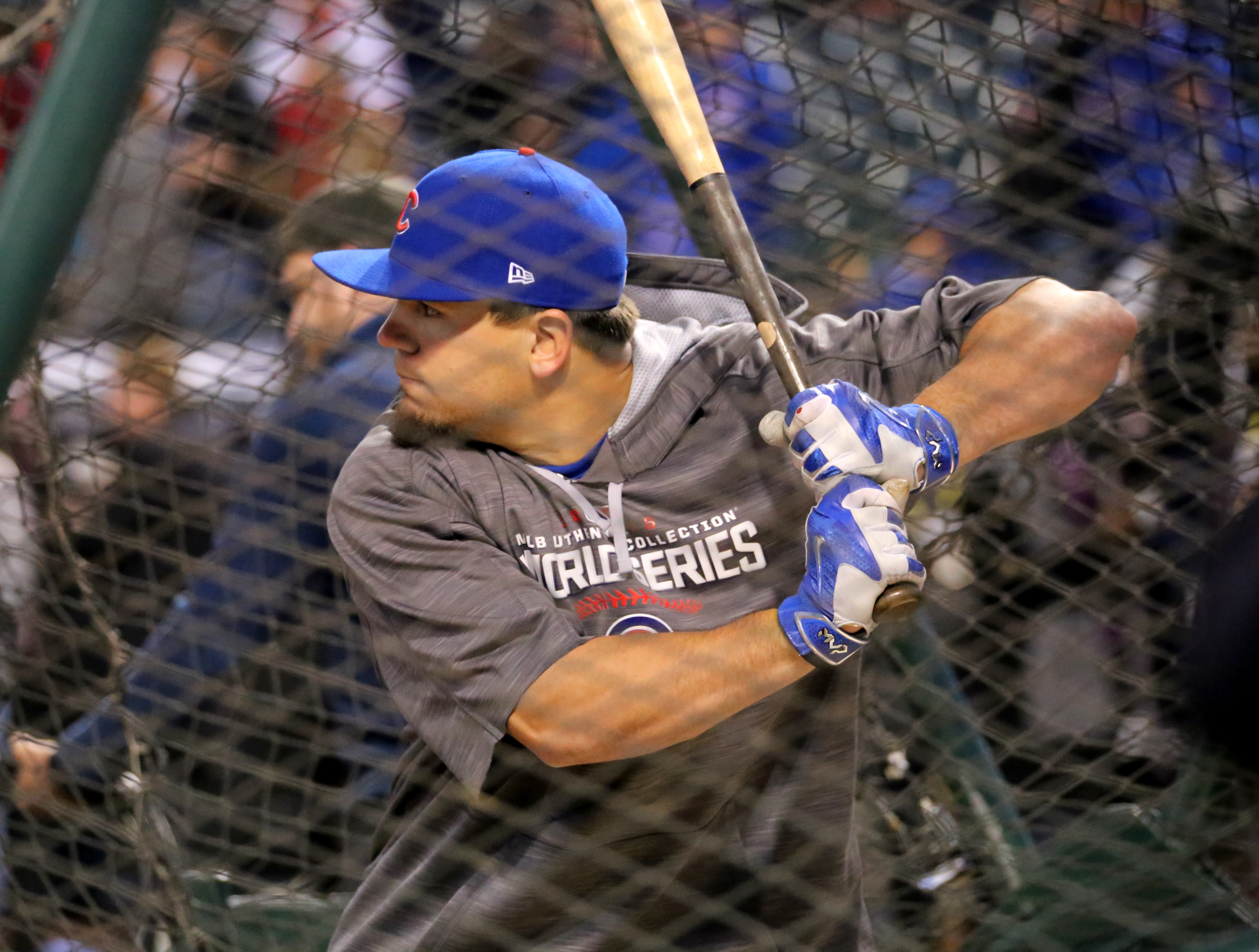
Schwarber with the Cubs in 2016

Schwarber only played two games before he was involved in an outfield collision with teammate Dexter Fowler on April 7, 2016, and was removed from the game with a left leg injury. Schwarber tore the anterior cruciate ligament and lateral collateral ligament in his left knee, and would miss the rest of the 2016 season. Despite being injured, there were many trade rumors surrounding Schwarber during the season, especially regarding the Cubs' desire for a premium reliever. Club president Theo Epstein addressed Schwarber's situation by saying it "wouldn't be right to trade him". The Cubs eventually acquired closer Aroldis Chapman from the New York Yankees without having to give up Schwarber. As the Cubs advanced further into the postseason, an unexpectedly fast recovery made the return of Schwarber increasingly more of a possibility. Schwarber participated in a successful on-field workout with the team at Dodger Stadium before Game 3 of the 2016 NLCS. On October 22, Schwarber went to the Arizona Fall League to play with the Mesa Solar Sox, the same day the Cubs played in Game 6 of the NLCS.

The Cubs added Schwarber to their roster for the 2016 World Series, and started him in Game 1 as their designated hitter. Schwarber's addition to the Cubs' starting line-up was surprising given he had not played in a Major League game since his injury in April. Schwarber hit a double off the right-field wall in the 4th inning of Game 1. He became the first major league position player in baseball history to get his first hit of the season during the World Series. He was not medically cleared to play on defense, and only made appearances as a pinch or designated hitter. Schwarber and the Cubs defeated the Indians in seven games to claim the Cubs' first World Series championship in 108 years. During the World Series, Schwarber recorded seven hits, including one double, two RBI, and one stolen base while batting for a .412 batting average and maintaining a .500 on-base percentage.

==== 2017 ====
Schwarber was the opening day starting left fielder and lead-off hitter during April and May for the 2017 Chicago Cubs season. Schwarber started the first third of the year with one of the worst batting averages in all of baseball, hitting just .120 for the month of May. When he was demoted to Triple-A on June 22 he had 12 home runs and 28 RBI but his batting average was the lowest in baseball, he was averaging one strike out every three at-bats and was hitting just .143 against left-handers. Schwarber returned to the Cubs active roster on July 6, after the All-Star break. By August 12, he had hit safely in 10 of 13 games with five home runs, three doubles and a triple. He had struck out 106 times in 300 plate appearances. Schwarber hit .288 with a .954 OPS in 59 September at-bats, hit six homers to finish with 30, and raised his season average from .168 on July 6 to .211 by the end of the year.

==== 2018–2020 ====
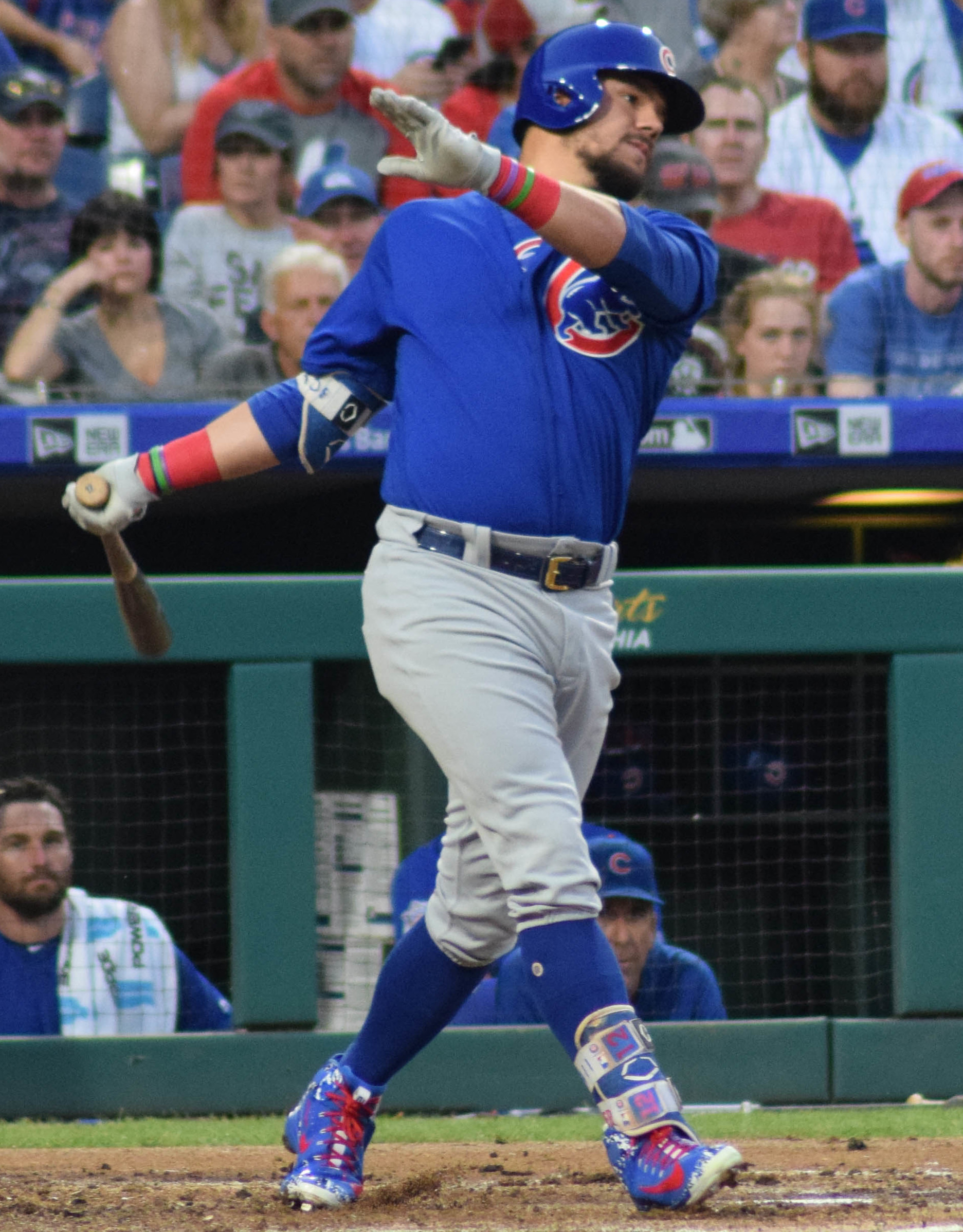
Schwarber with the Cubs in 2018

During the off-season Schwarber implemented a strict workout regimen and lost 30 pounds. Schwarber hit 55 home runs during three stages of the 2018 Major League Baseball Home Run Derby and finished second to Washington Nationals hometown hero Bryce Harper in the final round, 19–18. For the season, he batted .238 with 26 home runs, 14 doubles, and 61 RBI.

In 2019, Schwarber batted .250/.339/.531 with 38 home runs and 92 RBI. He was thrown the highest percentage of curveballs of all major league batters (14.7%). In 2019, on defense he led all National League left fielders in errors, with six, and had the lowest fielding percentage of all major league left fielders (.974).

In 2020, Schwarber batted .188/.308/.393, and had the lowest batting average of all qualified NL batters. On December 2, the Cubs non-tendered Schwarber.

=== Washington Nationals (2021) ===
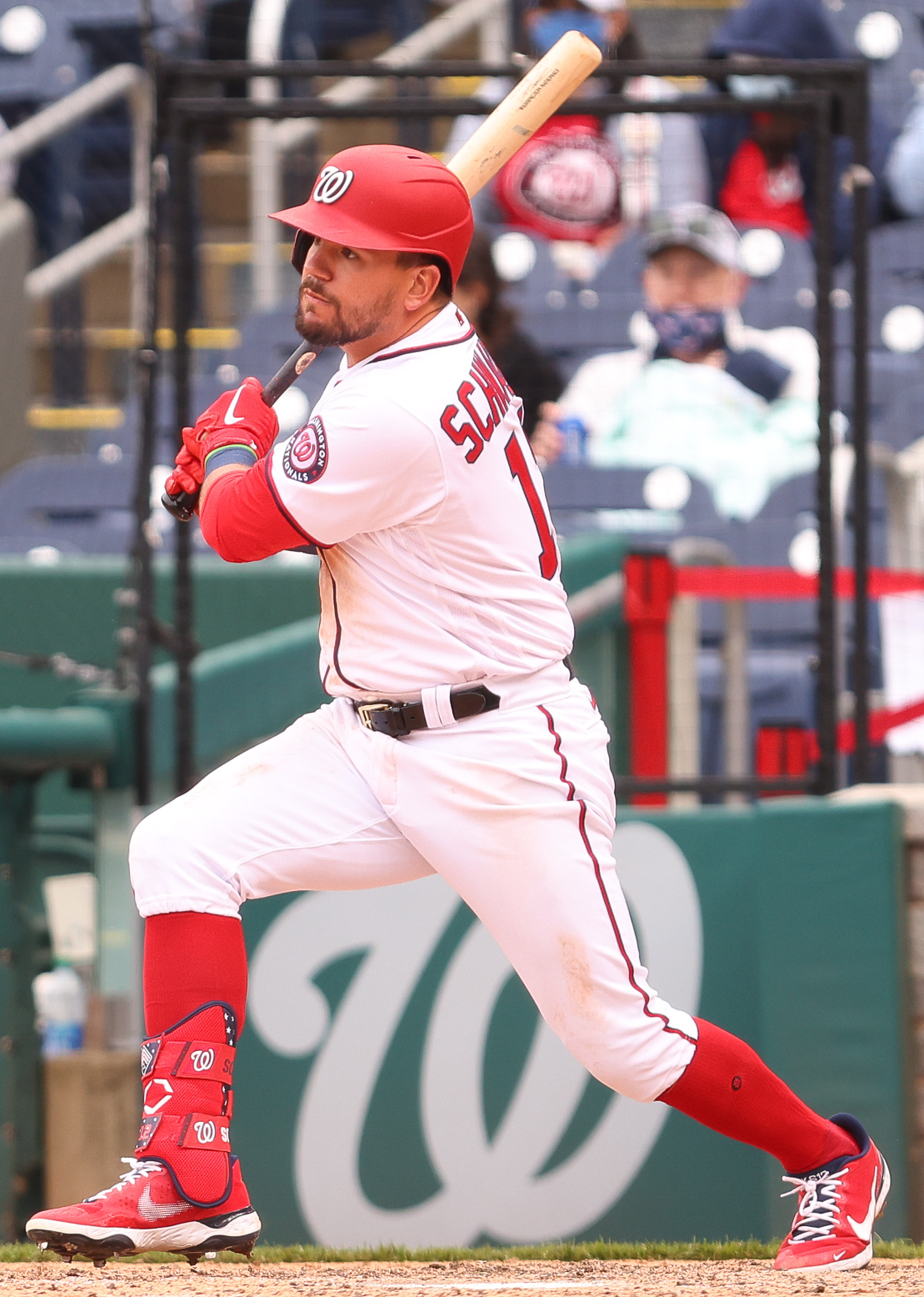
Schwarber with the Nationals in 2021

On January 9, 2021, the Washington Nationals announced they had signed Schwarber to a one-year major league contract containing a mutual option for 2022. After a slow start to the season, Schwarber went on a tear in June, hitting 16 home runs in an 18-game span from June 12 to 29. He had 5 multi-homer games during the stretch, including a 3-homer game against the New York Mets on June 20, and slashed .280/.362/.760. This was the most home runs hit in any month in the Nationals franchise history, and the second-most ever hit in June in Major League history. Schwarber and Frank Howard (during the 1968 Washington Senators season) are the only two MLB players to hit 11 home runs in 9 games. He was named the National League Player of the Month for his efforts. On July 3, he was added to the injured list with a right hamstring strain. Schwarber appeared in 72 games with the Nationals, batting .253 with 25 home runs and 53 RBIs.

=== Boston Red Sox (2021) ===
On July 29, 2021, Schwarber was traded to the Boston Red Sox in exchange for minor-league pitcher Aldo Ramirez. He was activated from the injured list on August 13 and made his Red Sox debut that evening against the Baltimore Orioles. In a change from his outfield role, the Red Sox had him learn first base, where he had mixed success defensively. Through the end of the regular season, Schwarber played in 41 games for Boston, batting .291 with seven home runs and 18 RBIs. He then played in 11 postseason games, batting 9-for-44 (.205) as the Red Sox advanced to the American League Championship Series (ALCS). In Game 3 of the ALCS, Schwarber hit a grand slam that was Boston's third in two games, setting an MLB record for the most grand slams in a postseason series. However, he went hitless in the next three games as the Red Sox lost to the Astros in six games. On November 5, he declined his half of a mutual option and became a free agent.

=== Philadelphia Phillies (2022–present) ===
==== 2022 ====
On March 20, 2022, Schwarber agreed to join the Philadelphia Phillies on a four-year, $79 million contract.

On April 8, Schwarber hit a home run in his first at-bat as a Phillie in the team's 9-5 win on Opening Day against the Oakland A's. Schwarber was awarded NL Player of the Month honors for June 2022, after batting .272 with 12 home runs (most of all MLB players in June), with an OPS of 1.064 and an OPS+ of 189 in 27 games. On September 16, 2022, Schwarber hit his 31st home run at the leadoff spot, breaking Jimmy Rollins's Phillies franchise record for most home runs at that spot in the batting order.

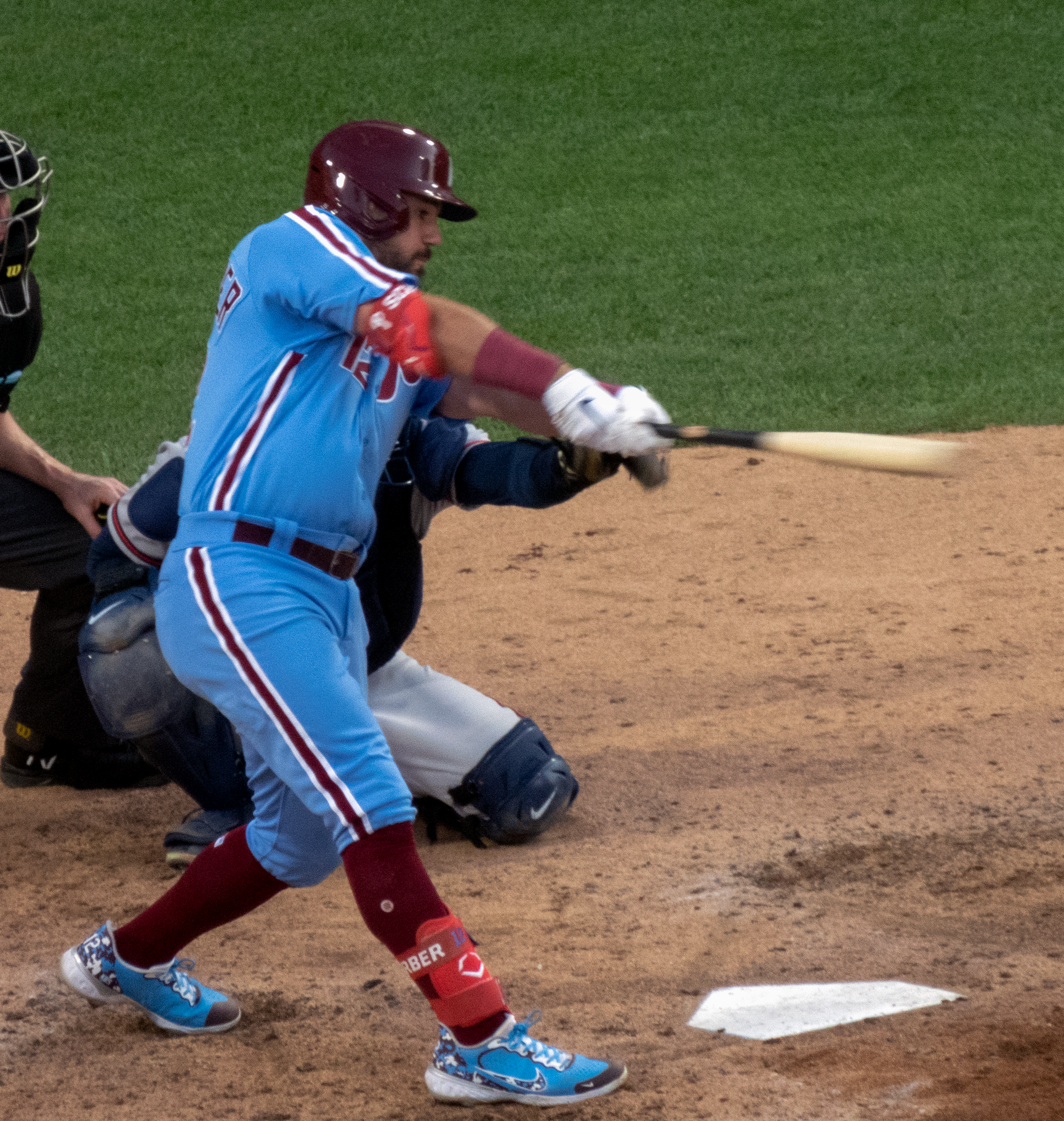
Schwarber with the Phillies in 2022

In 155 games in the regular season in 2022, Schwarber finished with a .218 batting average, 100 runs scored, an NL-leading 46 home runs, and 94 RBIs. He also struck out an MLB-leading 200 times. He had the highest fly-ball percentage of all major leaguers (51.1%).

In the first game of the National League Championship Series, Schwarber hit a 488 feet (149 m) home run at Petco Park, which was both the farthest hit ball ever tracked by StatCast at that stadium and by a Phillie. Schwarber hit two more home runs in the series as the Phillies defeated the Padres in five games, reaching their first World Series since 2009.

In the 2022 World Series against the Houston Astros, Schwarber batted .250 with five hits and four RBIs in six games. He also had the most home runs of any player in the series with three, including a game-tying solo shot to lead off Game 5 off of Justin Verlander and a go-ahead solo shot in Game 6 off of Framber Valdez in the top of the sixth inning; however, the Phillies would lose both games and the series.

Schwarber is credited with introducing the song "Dancing on My Own” to the Phillies clubhouse, and the song was played after every Phillies win during their run to the 2022 World Series.

==== 2023 ====
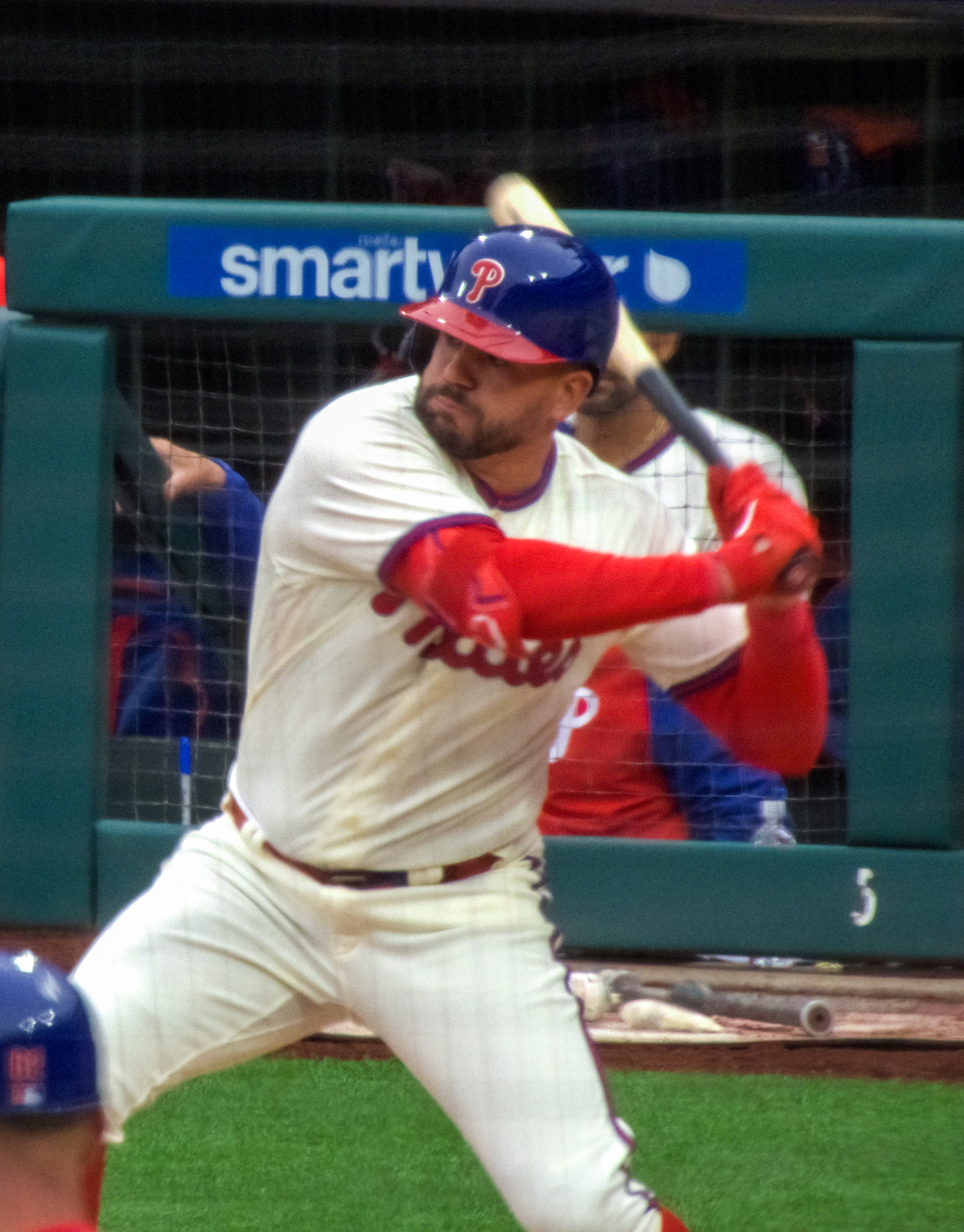
Schwarber with the Phillies in 2023

Schwarber hit his 200th career home run on April 4, against Domingo Germán of the New York Yankees.

On September 4, 2023, Schwarber launched his 40th home run of the season in a 9–7 win against the San Diego Padres. He became the fifth player in Phillies history to hit 40 home runs in consecutive seasons behind Chuck Klein, Mike Schmidt, Jim Thome, and Ryan Howard. In 160 games, Schwarber finished with a .197 batting average, 47 home runs, 104 RBI, 126 walks, and struck out an MLB-leading 215 times. He had the most plate appearances (720) of any player in MLB history who has finished a season below the Mendoza Line. His .197 batting average was also the lowest in MLB history for a player who hit at least 40 home runs in a season.

In the fourth inning of Game 4 of the National League Championship Series against the Diamondbacks, Schwarber hit his 19th career postseason home run, breaking Reggie Jackson's record for the most career postseason home runs by a left-handed batter in major league history.

==== 2024 ====
On August 7, Schwarber went 4-for-4, driving in seven runs and hitting three home runs, leading the Phillies to 9–4 win over the Dodgers. Less than a month later, on September 3, Schwarber would complete another 3-homer game, including a go-ahead three-run shot in the top of the 9th inning, to lead the Phillies to a 10–9 comeback win over the Blue Jays. Schwarber went 5-for-6 in the game, driving in six runs and becoming the first Phillies player to have two 3-homer games in the same season. He also became the first Phillies player since Mike Schmidt in 1976 to have five hits and three home runs in a game. One week later, on September 10, Schwarber hit his 14th leadoff home run of the season, breaking the single-season record of 13 set by Alfonso Soriano in 2003.

==== 2025 ====
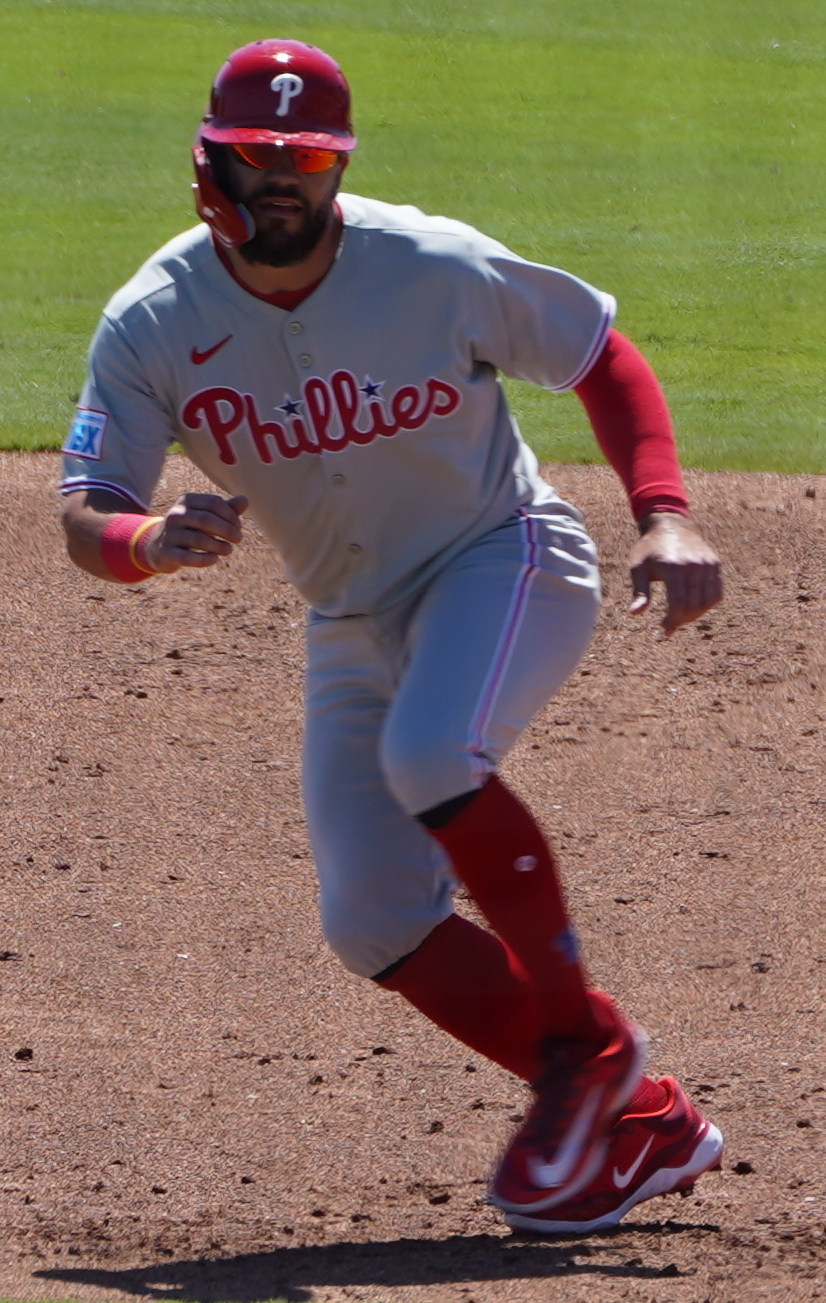
Schwarber running the bases in 2025

On May 14, Schwarber snapped a 47-game on-base streak that began on September 23, 2024. It was the fourth-longest streak in Phillies history. He hit his 300th home run on May 19. On July 11, Schwarber became the second player in Phillies history to hit 30 home runs before the All-Star break, joining Mike Schmidt in 1979.

In the All-Star Game, Schwarber participated in an All-Star Game tiebreaker swing-off in the event of a tie at 6–6 after 9 innings; he hit 3 home runs, leading the National League to win the All-Star Game tiebreaker over the American League 4–3. He was named the All-Star Game Most Valuable Player.

On July 25, Schwarber recorded his 1,000th career hit when he hit a two-run home run off Yankees pitcher Will Warren in the fifth inning. His 319 home runs are an MLB record for a player at the time of their 1,000th hit. On July 29, Schwarber hit his 37th home run of the season when he hit a two-run homer off White Sox pitcher Jonathan Cannon in the third inning. With that home run, Schwarber hit the most home runs by a Phillies hitter before August in Phillies franchise history. On August 4, Schwarber became the first player in the National League to reach 40 home runs, and the fastest player in Phillies history to reach the 40-homer plateau, doing so in the team's 112th game of the season.

On August 28, Schwarber became the 21st player in MLB history to hit four home runs in one game in a 19–4 rout of the Atlanta Braves. He became the fourth Phillies player to accomplish the feat, joining Mike Schmidt (April 17, 1976), Chuck Klein (July 10, 1936), and Ed Delahanty (July 13, 1896). On September 2, Schwarber was named the National League Player of the Week, co-winning with Rafael Devers for the 23rd week of the season after going 6-for-28 (.214) and slugging 1.005 with four home runs and ten RBIs in that period. On September 9, Schwarber hit his 50th home run of the season in a 9-3 victory over the New York Mets. With that homer, Schwarber became just the second player in franchise history, joining Ryan Howard (58 HRs in 2006), and only the 34th player in MLB history to reach the milestone. On September 24, Schwarber hit his 55th home run, setting a major league record for most home runs hit by a left-handed hitter against a left-handed pitcher with 23 home runs in a single season.

Schwarber finished first in the National League (second in both leagues) in home runs and first in both leagues in RBIs. On November 5, Schwarber became a free agent after his contract with the Phillies expired. He finished second place in NL MVP voting, only behind Shohei Ohtani who won the award unanimously.

==== 2026 ====
On December 9, 2025, Schwarber re-signed with the Phillies on a five-year, $150 million contract. On April 30, 2026, Schwarber hit his 350th career home run. On July 10, Schwarber was announced to be competing in the 2026 Home Run Derby in Philadelphia. He ultimately advanced to the final round of the competition, finishing runner-up to Jordan Walker. In 156 games of 2026, Schwarber hit 45 home runs, which tied with Peter Crow-Armstrong for the MLB lead that season. Also, Schwarber had a .232 batting average, 97 RBI, 105 walks, and struck out 220 times.

== International career ==
On December 6, 2022, the United States national baseball team announced that Schwarber had committed to play in the 2023 World Baseball Classic. During Team USA's first game of the tournament on March 11, 2023, against Great Britain, Schwarber hit a three-run home run to aid in a 6–1 victory. He also homered off Yu Darvish in the final against Japan, though Team USA lost the championship game and finished as runners-up in the tournament.

Schwarber committed to play for Team USA once again at the 2026 World Baseball Classic. During the tournament, Schwarber hit a two-run home run against Great Britain in Pool B play. Team USA advanced to the World Baseball Classic final for the second consecutive tournament, but was defeated by Venezuela and finished as runners-up again.

== Personal life ==
Schwarber is the son of Greg, a retired police chief of German and Italian descent, and Donna Cortez, a retired nurse of Puerto Rican descent. He has three sisters. Kyle's uncle Thomas Schwarber played college baseball as a pitcher at Ohio State and played professionally in the Detroit Tigers minor league system for three seasons from 1991 to 1993. Schwarber played football as a linebacker in high school and also participated in Middletown High School's show choir. He grew up a Cincinnati Reds fan. Schwarber chose "Schwarbs" as his nickname for the Players Weekend during the 2017 season.

Schwarber and his wife, Paige, married in December 2019. Their first son was born in March 2022. Their second son was born in early 2024.

== Charity work ==
In 2017, while with the Chicago Cubs, Schwarber launched "Schwarber's Neighborhood Heroes" to honor and give back to first responders, and also hosted his first inaugural fundraiser, "Schwarber's Block Party", to help raise funds for first responders. On August 23, 2019, Schwarber held his third annual block party, which was the last one he held in Chicago.

In 2023, Schwarber and his wife brought back the block party fundraiser, this time in Philadelphia, at Yards Brewing.

== See also ==
- 50 home run club
- List of Major League Baseball annual home run leaders
- List of Major League Baseball annual runs batted in leaders
- List of Major League Baseball career home run leaders
- List of Major League Baseball career strikeouts by batters leaders
- List of Major League Baseball home run records
- List of Major League Baseball postseason records
- List of Major League Baseball single-game home run leaders
- List of Major League Baseball single-inning home run leaders
- List of Philadelphia Phillies award winners and league leaders
- List of Philadelphia Phillies team records

== Notes ==
Awards and achievements
| Preceded by Fernando Tatís Jr. Paul Goldschmidt | National League Player of the Month; June 2021; June 2022 | Succeeded by Joey Votto; Austin Riley |
| Preceded by Nick Kurtz | Batters with four home runs in one game August 28, 2025 | Succeeded by Current |
