= Jordan Walker (baseball) =

American baseball player (born 2002)

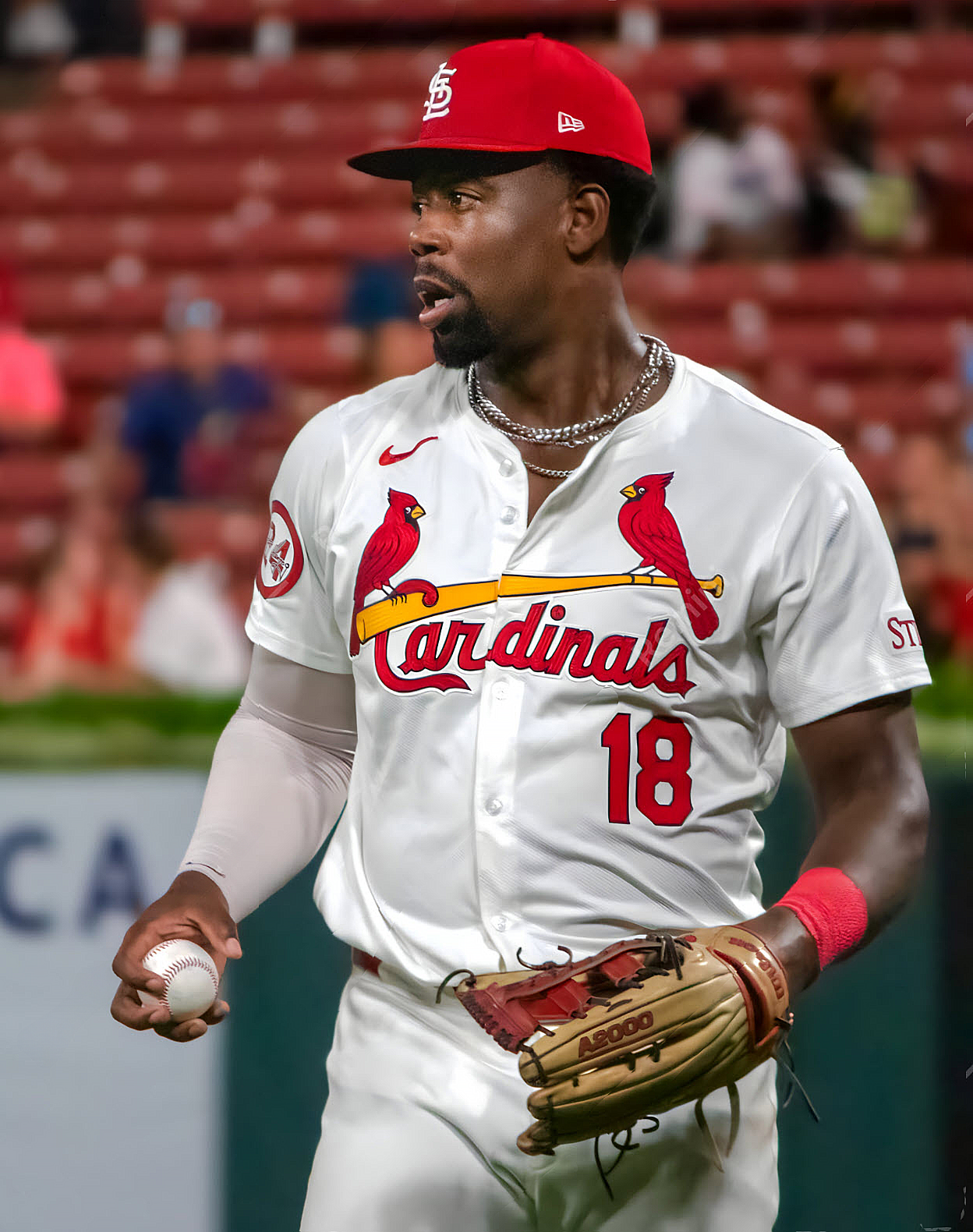
- Walker with the St. Louis Cardinals in 2024

St. Louis Cardinals – No. 18
- Right fielder
- Born: May 22, 2002 (age 24); Stone Mountain, Georgia, U.S.
- Bats: Right Throws: Right

MLB debut
- March 30, 2023, for the St. Louis Cardinals

MLB statistics (through 2026 season)
- Batting average: .251
- Home runs: 56
- Runs batted in: 214
- Stats at Baseball Reference

Teams
- St. Louis Cardinals (2023–present)

Career highlights and awards
- All-Star (2026)

Jordan Alexander Walker (born May 22, 2002) is an American professional baseball right fielder for the St. Louis Cardinals of Major League Baseball (MLB). The Cardinals selected him in the first round of the 2020 MLB draft. He made his MLB debut in 2023 and was named an All-Star in 2026.

== Amateur career ==
Walker attended Decatur High School where he played baseball. In 2019, his junior year, he batted .519 with 17 home runs, 60 runs batted in (RBIs), and 24 stolen bases. As a senior in 2020, he hit .457 with four home runs and 15 RBIs over 16 games before the season was cut short due to the COVID-19 pandemic, and was selected as the Georgia Gatorade Player of the Year. He committed to play college baseball at Duke University.

== Professional career ==
=== Minor leagues ===
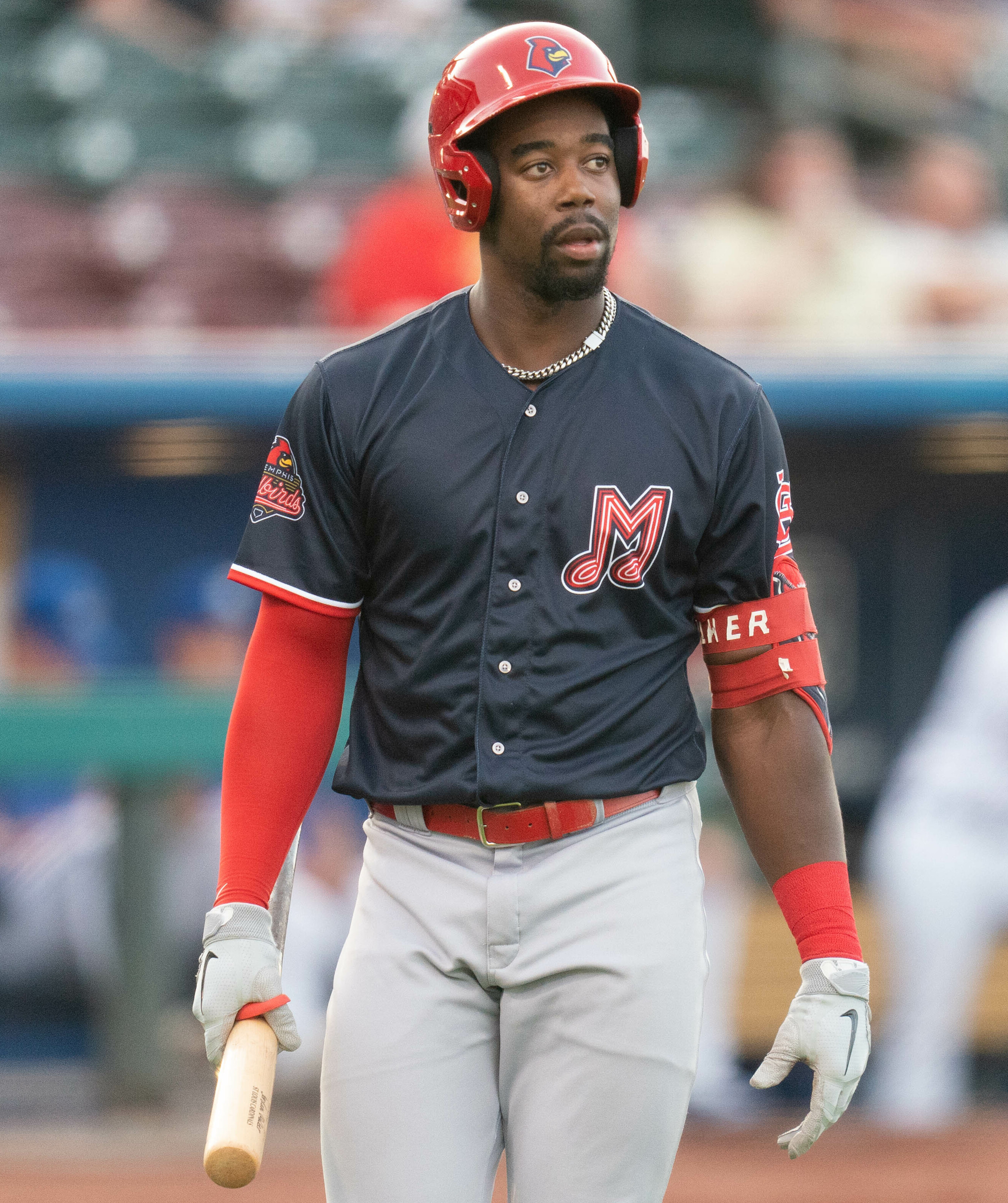
Walker with the Memphis Redbirds in 2023

The St. Louis Cardinals selected Walker in the first round of the 2020 Major League Baseball draft with the 21st overall selection. On June 23, Walker signed with the Cardinals for a $2.9 million signing bonus. He did not play a minor league game in 2020 due to the cancellation of the minor league season caused by the pandemic.

In 2021, the Cardinals assigned Walker to the Palm Beach Cardinals of the Low-A Southeast. He homered on the first pitch of his first professional at-bat. On May 28, he was placed on the injured list, and was activated on June 12. He was promoted to the Peoria Chiefs of the High-A Central in late June. Over 82 games between the two clubs, Walker slashed .317/.388/.548 with 14 home runs, 48 RBIs, 25 doubles, and 14 stolen bases. The Cardinals named him their Minor League Co-Player of the Year alongside Juan Yepez.

Walker was assigned to the Springfield Cardinals of the Double-A Texas League for the 2022 season. Along with Masyn Winn, he was selected to represent the Cardinals at the 2022 All-Star Futures Game. In early August, he began playing in the outfield after being a third baseman throughout his career. Over 119 games with Springfield, he compiled a .306/.388/.510 slash line with 19 home runs, 58 RBIs, 31 doubles, and 22 stolen bases. He was selected to play in the Arizona Fall League for the Salt River Rafters after the season.

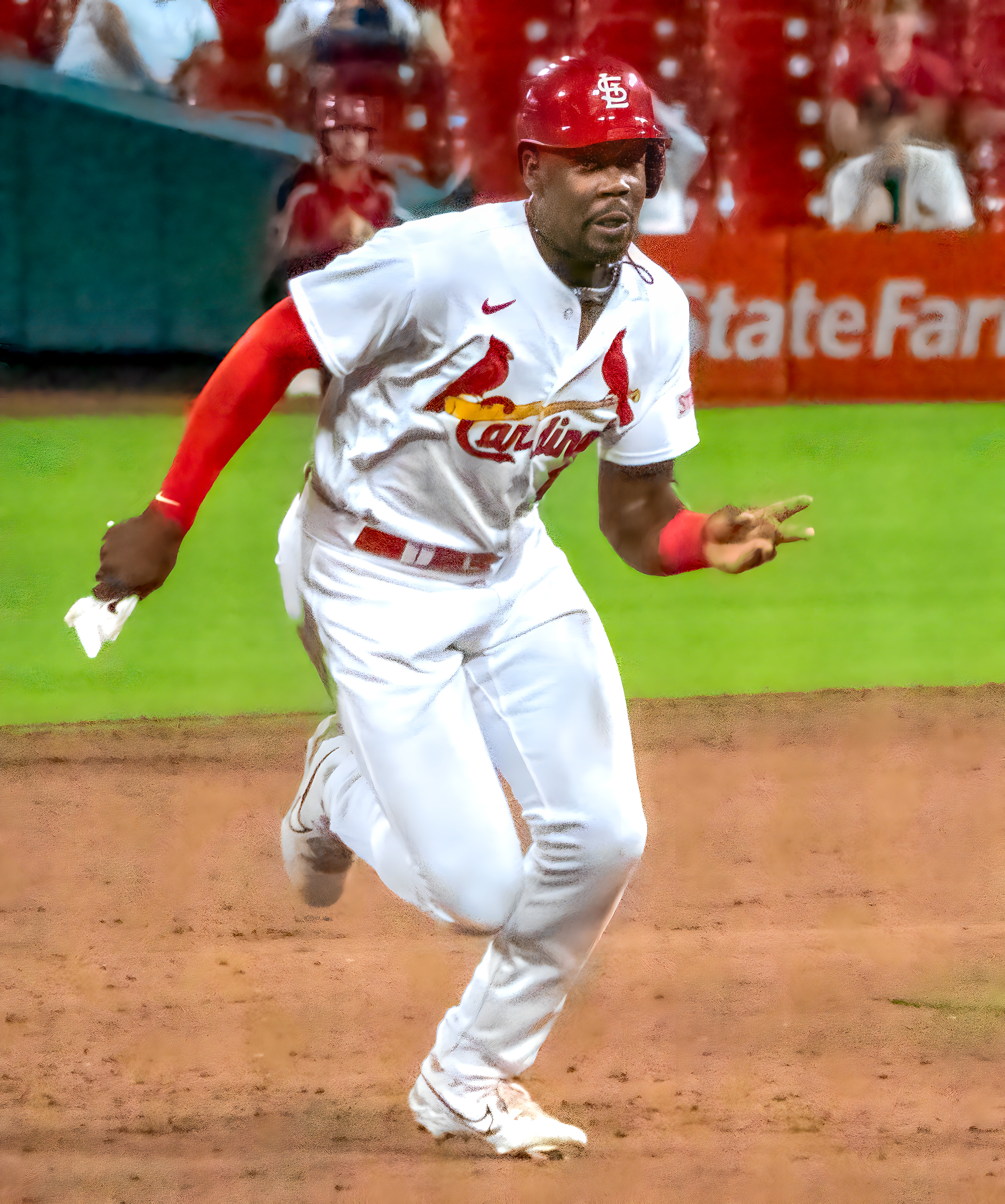
Walker runs to third base, 2023.

=== St. Louis Cardinals ===
On March 25, 2023, Cardinals president of baseball operations John Mozeliak announced that Walker had made the Opening Day roster. On March 30, Walker started in right field for the Cardinals and recorded his first major league hit and run batted in. On April 5, Walker recorded his first career major league home run off of Michael Tonkin of the Atlanta Braves. On April 12, Walker singled off of Connor Seabold of the Colorado Rockies. The hit was his 12th consecutive game in which he hit safely, tying Eddie Murphy of the 1912 Philadelphia Athletics for the longest hitting streak for a rookie under the age of 21 since 1900. He was optioned to the Memphis Redbirds of the Triple-A International League on April 26, and was subsequently recalled to the major leagues on June 2, and spent the remainder of the season with St. Louis. Over 117 games with the Cardinals in his rookie season, in which he made 115 starts in the outfield and as designated hitter, he slashed .276/.342/.445 with 16 home runs and 51 RBIs.

Walker opened the 2024 season as the Cardinals' starting right fielder. He was optioned to Memphis on April 24 after starting the year with a .155 batting average. Walker was recalled by the Cardinals on August 12, going 1-for-11 over four games, before being sent back down on August 20. He was recalled for a final time, on August 30, following Tommy Pham being designated for assignment. Walker appeared in 51 games for the Cardinals and hit .201 with five home runs and 20 RBIs.

Walker was named to St. Louis' Opening Day roster for the 2025 season. He missed time during the season due to a wrist injury and appendicitis and was placed on the injured list. He was activated from the injured list on July 18, and spent the remainder of the season on the Cardinals active roster. He played in a total of 111 games for St. Louis and had a slash line of .215/.278/.306 with six home runs, 41 RBIs, and 13 doubles across 363 total at-bats.

In 2026 spring training, Walker spent time in the Cardinals' hitting lab, with Walker stating he wanted to "slow things down in the batter’s box and be ready for any pitch coming to the plate." He made the Cardinals Opening Day roster, and started for the team in right field and batted sixth in the lineup. Walker was named an All-Star for the first time in his career after posting a .290 batting average, 19 home runs and a National League-leading 63 RBI. He won the 2026 Home Run Derby, defeating Kyle Schwarber in the final round, 12–11. He hit his final six home runs in a row to secure the win and became the first Cardinal to win the Home Run Derby. Walker ended the 2026 season with a .269/.327/.466 slash line with 29 home runs, 102 RBIs, 33 doubles, and 22 stolen bases. He was a finalist for the Silver Slugger Award and was named to the All-MLB Second Team.

== See also ==
- All-Star Futures Game all-time roster
