= Brian Peets =

American football player (born 1955)

No. 88, 82
- Position: Tight end

Personal information
- Born: July 15, 1955 (age 71); Stockton, California, U.S.
- Listed height: 6 ft 4 in (1.93 m)
- Listed weight: 225 lb (102 kg)

Career information
- High school: Linden (Linden, California)
- College: Pacific (1974–1977)
- NFL draft: 1978: undrafted

Career history
- Seattle Seahawks (1978–1980); San Francisco 49ers (1981); San Diego Chargers (1982)*
- * Offseason or practice squad member only

Career NFL statistics
- Receptions: 27
- Receiving yards: 312
- Receiving TDs: 1
- Games played: 29
- Games started: 14
- Stats at Pro Football Reference

Brian Canvin Peets (born July 15, 1956) is an American former professional football player who was a tight end for three seasons in the National Football League (NFL) with the Seattle Seahawks and San Francisco 49ers. He played college football for the Pacific Tigers.

== Early life and college ==
Brian Canvin Peets was born on July 15, 1956, in Stockton, California. He attended Linden High School in Linden, California.

He was a four-year letterman for the Pacific Tigers of the University of the Pacific from 1974 to 1977. He caught four passes for 49 yards in 1974, five passes for 73 yards and one touchdown in 1975, 13 passes for 161 yards in 1976, and 14 passes for 281 yards and three touchdowns in 1977.

== Professional career ==
After going undrafted in the 1978 NFL draft, Peets signed with the Seattle Seahawks on May 8. He was released on August 20, re-signed on October 3, released again on November 15, and re-signed again on November 22, 1978. Overall, he played in eight games for the Seahawks during the 1978 season, catching one pass for 14 yards. Peets played in all 16 games, starting 14, in 1979, recording 25 receptions for 293 yards and one touchdown. The Seahawks finished the year with a 9–7 record. Peets was placed on injured reserve on August 26, 1980, and spent the entire 1980 season there. He was released by the Seahawks the next year on August 25, 1981.

Peets was signed by the San Francisco 49ers on September 15, 1981. He appeared in five games for the 49ers during the 1981 season, catching one pass for five yards. He was released on October 28, 1981.

Peets signed with the San Diego Chargers on July 8, 1982.
