= Wahlen (disambiguation) =

Wahlen is a municipality in Basel-Country in Switzerland.

Wahlen may also refer to:

- Maria Wahlen (1957–1983), Swedish woman murdered in California; see Murder of Marie Lilienberg and Maria Wahlen
- Catrin Wahlen (born 1972), German politician
- George Edward Wahlen (1924–2009), U.S. Army major who served with the U.S. Navy as a hospital corpsman
- Friedrich Traugott Wahlen (1899–1985), Swiss agronomist and politician
- Gunilla Wahlén (born 1951), Swedish Left Party politician
