= Brooke Bryant =

American ice hockey player (born 2000)

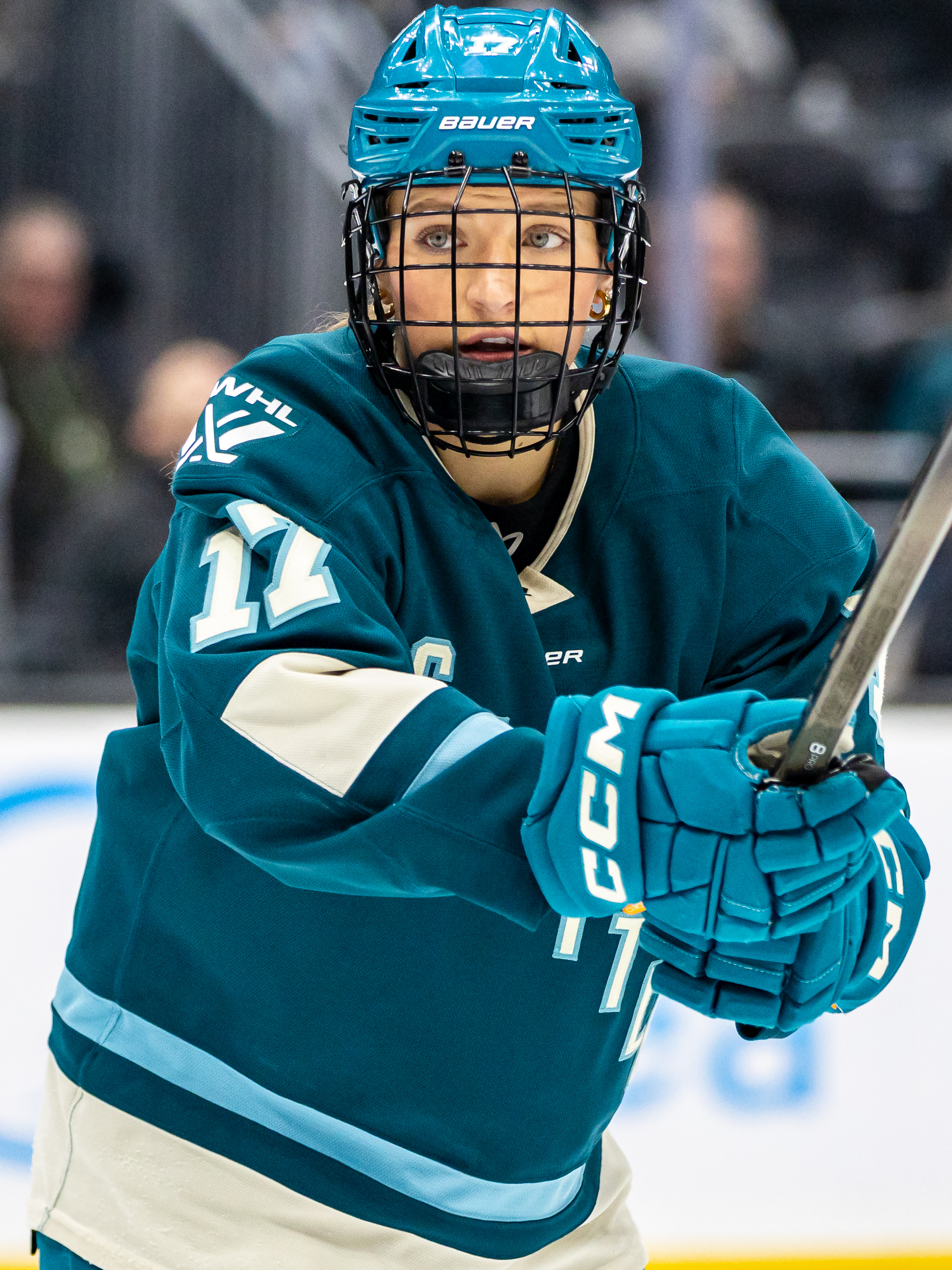
- Bryant with the Seattle Torrent in 2026
- Born: August 22, 2000 (age 26) Stockton, California, U.S.
- Height: 5 ft 6 in (168 cm)
- Position: Forward
- Shoots: Right
- PWHL team Former teams: San Jose Sea Lions; Minnesota Frost; Seattle Torrent
- Playing career: 2018–present

Brooke Bryant (born August 22, 2000) is an American professional ice hockey forward for the San Jose Sea Lions of the Professional Women's Hockey League (PWHL). She played college ice hockey at Minnesota State.

Bryant was the first player born and raised in California to play in the PWHL. She won back-to-back Walter Cup championships with the Minnesota Frost in the league's first two seasons (2023–24 and 2024–25).

== Early life ==
Bryant was born on August 22, 2000, in Linden, California. Growing up there was no girls hockey team she could play for in San Joaquin County, California, so she joined the Stockton Colts boys team at Oak Park Ice Arena. While playing with the Colts, she also joined the San Jose Jr. Sharks. She was part of the 12-under team that won the Pacific District Championship in 2012, qualifying them for that year’s USA Hockey Tier II National Championships. Starting at this time, she wore the jersey number 19 until college as her favorite player on the San Jose Sharks was Joe Thornton. To continue her hockey career at a higher level, she joined the Anaheim Lady Ducks girls hockey program while simultaneously attending Linden High School in Linden, California. With the Anaheim Lady Ducks U19 team, she was the top scorer and helped the team win third place at the USA National Championship. While in high school she played softball and volleyball, earning four varsity letters in each sport.

== Playing career ==
=== College ===
Bryant played five seasons for the Minnesota State Mavericks from 2018 to 2023. During the 2018–19 season, in her freshman year, she appeared in all 35 games and recorded 11 goals and nine assists for 20 points. She led the team in goals and tied for second on the team in points, becoming the first freshman to record 20 points in a season since 2010–11 and posted the eighth-most points by a freshman in Minnesota State history. During the 2019–20 season, in her sophomore year, she played in all 37 games and recorded four goals and four assists. During the 2021–21 season, in her junior year, she recorded four assist in 18 games, in a season that was shortened due to the COVID-19 pandemic. She was named to the WCHA All-Academic Team.

During the 2021–22 season, in her senior year, she appeared in all 35 games and recorded eight goals and six assists. She scored two goals and had one assist in a 9–3 victory at Merrimack on September 25, 2021. She was again named to the WCHA All-Academic Team. During the 2022–23 season, in her fifth and final season as a graduate student, she recorded seven goals and 13 assists in 36 games. She finished her collegiate career with 34 goals and 36 assists for 70 points in 161 games.

=== Professional ===
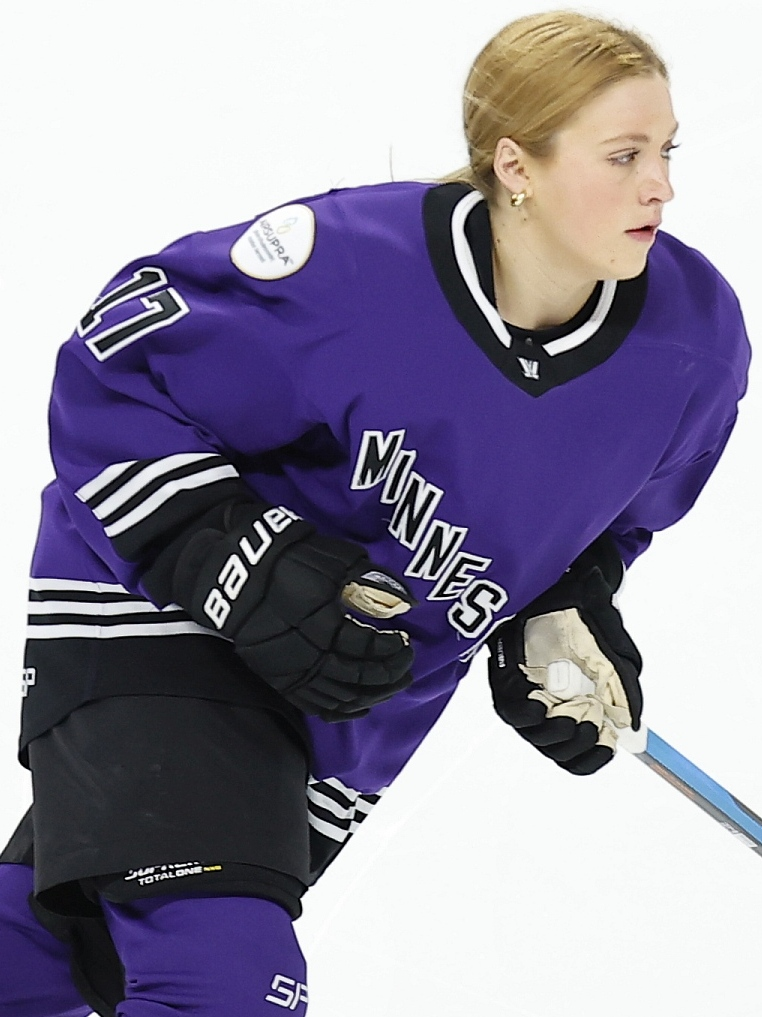
Bryant with PWHL Minnesota in 2024

==== Minnesota Whitecaps (2023) ====
On May 11, 2023, Bryant signed with the Minnesota Whitecaps of the Premier Hockey Federation (PHF). The PHF ceased operations on June 29, 2023, as a result she never played a game for the Whitecaps.

==== Minnesota Frost (2023–2025) ====
On November 29, 2023, Bryant signed a one-year contract with PWHL Minnesota. During the 2023–24 season, she recorded one goal in 22 regular season games. She was the first player born and raised in California to play in the PWHL.

Minnesota finished the regular season as the fourth seed and advanced through the playoffs. Bryant dressed for six of the team's ten playoff games. Minnesota defeated Boston three games to two in the Walter Cup Finals, with Bryant helping the team win the inaugural Walter Cup.

Bryant re-signed with the Minnesota Frost for the 2024–25 season. During the season, she recorded one goal and three assists in 26 regular season games. The Frost again finished as the fourth seed in the regular season and advanced to the Walter Cup Finals, where they defeated the Ottawa Charge three games to one. All four games in the series were decided by 2-1 overtime results. Bryant became a two-time Walter Cup champion, one of 16 players from the inaugural Minnesota team to win both championships.

==== Seattle Torrent (2025–2026) ====
Prior to the 2025–26 season, Bryant was invited to the Seattle Torrent's pre-season training camp. On November 20, 2025, following training camp, she signed a one-year contract with the Torrent. Bryant made her Torrent debut on November 21, 2025, in the team's inaugural game against the Vancouver Goldeneyes at Pacific Coliseum in Vancouver. On November 28, 2025, she returned to face her former Minnesota teammates in Seattle's home opener at Climate Pledge Arena. The game drew 16,014 fans, breaking the record for the largest crowd for a women's hockey game in a U.S. arena, surpassing the previous U.S. record of 15,359 and becoming the highest-attended primary home venue game in PWHL history. Seattle fell 3–0 to the two-time defending Walter Cup champion Minnesota Frost.

==== San Jose Sea Lions (2026–) ====
Bryant joined the newly established San Jose Sea Lions ahead of the 2026–27 season, returning to California as a professional player. She had previously been a member of the San Jose Jr. Sharks program.

== Career statistics ==
Note: GP = Games played; G = Goals; A = Assists; Pts = Points; PIM = Penalty minutes;

			Regular season					Playoffs
Season	Team	League	GP	G	A	Pts	PIM	GP	G	A	Pts	PIM
2018–19	Minnesota State University	WCHA	35	11	9	20	31	—	—	—	—	—
2019–20	Minnesota State University	WCHA	37	4	4	8	26	—	—	—	—	—
2020–21	Minnesota State University	WCHA	18	0	4	4	14	—	—	—	—	—
2021–22	Minnesota State University	WCHA	35	8	6	14	51	—	—	—	—	—
2022–23	Minnesota State University	WCHA	36	7	13	20	26	—	—	—	—	—
2023–24	PWHL Minnesota	PWHL	22	1	0	1	6	6	0	0	0	0
2024–25	Minnesota Frost	PWHL	26	1	3	4	6	3	0	0	0	0
2025–26	Seattle Torrent	PWHL	23	0	1	1	8	—	—	—	—	—
PWHL totals			71	2	4	6	20	9	0	0	0	0

== Awards and honors ==
Honors	Year
PWHL
Walter Cup Champion	2024, 2025
