= Murder of Marie Lilienberg and Maria Wahlen =

1983 murder of two Swedish tourists in California

Marie Lilienberg
- Marie Lilienberg in the United States during 1983
- Born: Marie Lilienberg; Danderyd, Sweden
- Died: c. 22 July 1983 (aged 23); Santa Barbara, California, United States
- Cause of death: Stabbing
- Body discovered: Los Padres National Forest
- Resting place: Cypress Lawn Memorial Park, Colma, California, United States
- Known for: Murder victim

Maria Wahlen
- Maria Wahlen in the United States during 1983
- Born: Maria Birgitta Wahlén; Alingsas, Sweden
- Died: c. 22 July 1983 (aged 25); Santa Barbara, California, United States
- Cause of death: Stabbing
- Body discovered: Los Padres National Forest
- Resting place: Cypress Lawn Memorial Park, Colma, California, United States
- Known for: Murder victim

Marie Lilienberg and Maria Wahlen were a pair of Swedish tourists who were murdered by an unknown assailant while hitchhiking from Northern California to Los Angeles in July 1983. The case attracted significant media attention in the United States during that time period, before going cold for several years. It gained renewed interest in September 1991, following an anonymous phone call to the Swedish consulate in San Diego, which implicated a Canadian man named Loren in the murders. The anonymous phone call led to the case being featured in an April 1992 episode of Unsolved Mysteries. Loren and the anonymous caller were later identified by police, with the former never being charged for the murders. It is suspected that Loren may have been Californian-based serial killer Loren Herzog, although this has not been officially confirmed.

== Case information ==
Lilienberg and Wahlen first met each other in January 1983, while working as maids at a skiing resort in Vail, Colorado. Lilienberg was studying in Sweden to be a gymnastics teacher and Wahlen was a pre-school teacher in the country. Lillienberg arrived in the United States during the fall of 1982, having previously visited the country twice before, while it was Wahlen's first time in the country. The duo later visited Hawaii together when the skiing season ended, before deciding to spend the summer together exploring the coast of California. They planned to hitchhike for the Californian trip, as they were running low on money, having only 50 dollars in their final days.

They were last seen on July 22, 1983, in Redwood City, leaving the house of an acquaintance they had met in Colorado. They planned to hitchhike to Los Angeles, where they would catch a flight to New York, which was scheduled to depart in two days. From New York they would have caught another flight back to Sweden. Wahlen kept a detailed diary of her journeys, with the last entry on July 21, 1983.

On the day they were scheduled to depart for New York, several items belonging to the women were found in a dumpster behind a business near a freeway in Commerce in Los Angeles County. Among the items found were Wahlen's diary, as well as two undeveloped rolls of film. Police later developed the photos in order see if they contained clues related to the disappearance.

Their fathers, Ove Lilienberg and Lars Wahlen, had kept in regular contact with them via phone calls up until July 16, 1983. The fathers travelled to California at the beginning of August 1983 to find their daughters, making several pleas to the media.

On August 18, 1983, the badly decomposed bodies of Lilienberg and Wahlen were found by deer hunters in the Los Padres National Forest, 25 miles east of Santa Maria, California (although the Unsolved Mysteries segment identified the area as being near Santa Barbara). Due to the condition of the bodies, their identities had to be confirmed by dental records brought in from Sweden. The women were both naked, having been sexually assaulted and stabbed to death. One of their arms had been torn off, presumably because of wildlife such as coyotes.

The story was picked up by the American media for the rest of the summer of 1983, with many noting that the women came from a more trusting society where hitchhiking was not viewed as dangerous.

On September 26, 1991 an anonymous phone caller rang the Swedish consulate in San Diego with information regarding the murders. The caller claimed he knew a Canadian man named Loren who would drive through San Diego every year, on his way to Mexico. He stated Loren hated women, and that Loren had once told him he came across two Swedish women in 1983 who tried to con him. Loren and the anonymous caller were later identified by police, but no one was ever charged for the murders, with the case continuing to remain unsolved.

Loren was described in the call as having red hair. The description of Loren's appearance conflicts with that of Loren Herzog, who many believe may be a possible suspect in the case. Herzog also had no known connections to Canada, and would have only been 17 years old at the time of the murders. One of Herzog's victims, prostitute Robin Armtrout, was raped and stabbed 46 times in 1985. This fits the manner in which Lilienberg and Wahlen were murdered, with the duo also being raped and stabbed.

Ove Lilienberg died in 2020.

=== Unsolved Mysteries segment ===
The Unsolved Mysteries segment originally aired on April 8, 1992, and was the first coverage of the case on network television in the United States since the discovery of the bodies less than nine years earlier. The segment featured an interview with trucker Mark Hanson, who remembered once giving the duo a ride from San Diego to Compton.

Repeat broadcasts on Lifetime Television for many years thereafter included an update that detailed how police had identified Loren from details provided by the anonymous caller. In the update, host Robert Stack said police had searched Loren's apartment, and that there was further evidence which could implicate him in the murders, with police continuing their investigation to determine whether there was enough evidence to charge him. When Unsolved Mysteries was released to streaming services in the 2010s, the update was removed, and all references to Loren's name were edited out, though the anonymous phone call to the Swedish consulate remained part of the publicly accessible video. Some of the music from the original broadcast version of the segment was also replaced.
