= Aaron Judge =

American baseball player (born 1992)

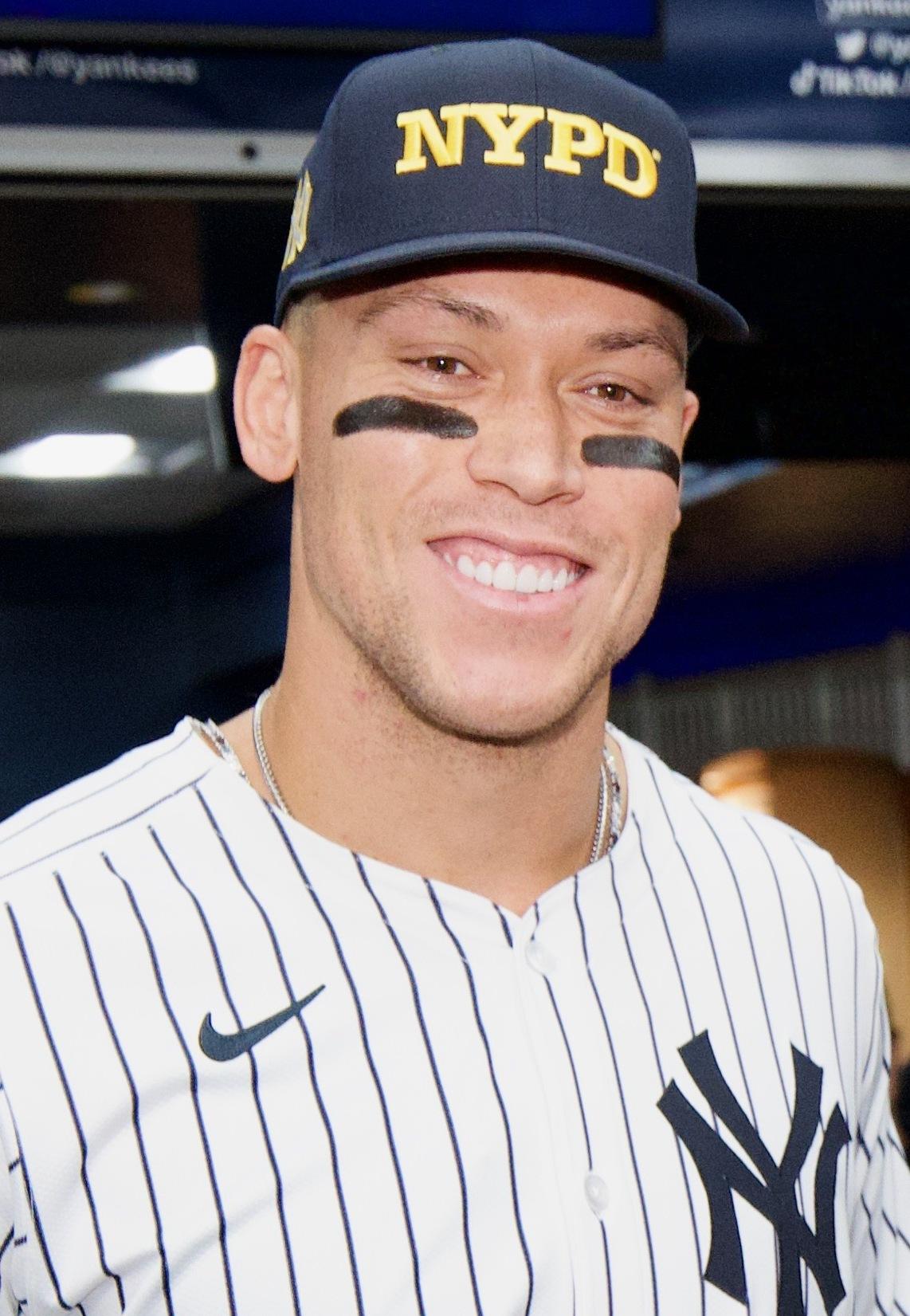
- Judge with the New York Yankees in 2025

New York Yankees – No. 99
- Right fielder
- Born: April 26, 1992 (age 34); Sacramento, California, U.S.
- Bats: Right Throws: Right

MLB debut
- August 13, 2016, for the New York Yankees

MLB statistics (through 2026 season)
- Batting average: .291
- Home runs: 386
- Runs batted in: 871
- Stats at Baseball Reference

Teams
- New York Yankees (2016–present)

Career highlights and awards
- 8× All-Star (2017, 2018, 2021–2026); 3× AL MVP (2022, 2024, 2025); 4× All-MLB First Team (2021, 2022, 2024, 2025); AL Rookie of the Year (2017); 5× Silver Slugger Award (2017, 2021, 2022, 2024, 2025); 3× AL Hank Aaron Award (2022, 2024, 2025); Roberto Clemente Award (2023); MLB batting champion (2025); 3× AL home run leader (2017, 2022, 2024); 2× MLB RBI leader (2022, 2024); AL record 62 home runs, single-season
Medals
Men's baseball
Representing United States
World Baseball Classic
Silver medal – second place	2026 Miami	Team

Aaron James Judge (born April 26, 1992) is an American professional baseball right fielder for the New York Yankees of Major League Baseball (MLB). He is an eight-time MLB All-Star and three-time American League (AL) Most Valuable Player Award (MVP) winner. He holds the AL record for most home runs in a season with 62. He stands 6 feet 7 inches (2.01 m) tall and weighs 282 pounds (128 kg), making him one of the tallest and largest players in MLB. He is considered to be among the best power hitters of all time.

Judge played college baseball for the Fresno State Bulldogs, and was selected by the Yankees with the 32nd pick in the first round of the 2013 MLB draft. After making his MLB debut in 2016, Judge won AL Rookie of the Year in 2017 by unanimous vote and finished second in AL MVP voting. He hit an AL-leading 52 home runs, temporarily setting a new MLB rookie record, and became the first rookie to win the Home Run Derby. In 2022, Judge won his first MVP after setting the AL single-season home run record, breaking the 61-year-old mark held by Roger Maris.

Following the 2022 season, Judge re-signed with the Yankees on a nine-year, $360-million contract and was named the team's captain. In 2024, he won his second MVP by unanimous vote, leading MLB in home runs and OPS while becoming the fastest MLB player to reach 300 career home runs. That postseason, the Yankees won their first AL pennant in 15 years, but lost in the World Series. He won his third MVP and second consecutive in 2025, and also captured his first batting title. Judge captained the United States national team during the 2026 World Baseball Classic.

== Early life ==
Judge was born on April 26, 1992, in Sacramento, California. He was adopted one day later by Patty and Wayne Judge, who both worked as teachers in nearby Linden. He has an older brother, John, who was also adopted. Judge is biracial. Growing up, Judge was a San Francisco Giants fan. He attended Linden High School, where he was a three-sport star. Judge played as a pitcher and first baseman for the baseball team, a wide receiver for the football team, and as a center for the basketball team.

As a sophomore, Judge earned All-Mother Lode League honors in varsity baseball as a first baseman. The following year, he was named the Mother Lode League's Most Outstanding Player in basketball after leading Linden to its first league title since 1986. As a senior, he was selected as Linden High School's Athlete of the Year and received team and Mother Lode League MVP honors in all three sports, while also being named to The Record's All-Area first team for each. Judge set school records for single-season receiving yards (969) and touchdown receptions (17), and led the basketball team in scoring at 18.2 points per game while shooting 56% from the field and averaging 12.8 rebounds and 2.3 blocks, earning Cal-Hi Sports Division IV all-state recognition. In baseball, he captured the Mother Lode League's Triple Crown by hitting .500 with seven home runs and 32 RBIs, and he dominated on the mound as well, going 6–0 with a 0.88 ERA and 65 strikeouts, helping lead Linden to a league championship and a berth in the California Interscholastic Federation Division III playoffs.

Judge graduated from Linden High in 2010. He was the sole inductee into the Linden Athletic Hall of Fame in 2019.

== College career ==
Several colleges recruited Judge to play tight end in football, including Notre Dame, Stanford, and UCLA, but he preferred baseball. The Oakland Athletics selected him in the 31st round of the 2010 MLB draft. He opted to enroll at California State University, Fresno, to play for the Bulldogs baseball team.

In 2011, Fresno State shared the Western Athletic Conference (WAC) regular season title, won the WAC Tournament, and qualified for the NCAA Division I baseball tournament. Judge was named the WAC Freshman of the Year, earned All-WAC First Team and All-Tournament Team honors, and was selected as a Freshman All-American by Louisville Slugger.

In 2012, Fresno State repeated as WAC tournament champions, with Judge earning All-WAC First Team honors for the second consecutive year and another selection to the All-Tournament Team. He finished the season tied for second in the conference with 13 stolen bases and ranked fifth with 47 runs scored. He also won the 2012 College Home Run Derby. That summer, he played collegiate summer baseball for the Brewster Whitecaps of the Cape Cod Baseball League, where he received the team's Citizenship Award for being a positive team member.

As a junior in 2013, Judge led the Bulldogs in home runs (12), doubles (15), and runs batted in (36), earning All-Mountain West Conference First Team honors. He was named to the all-conference team in all three of his seasons for the Bulldogs—in the WAC in his first two seasons, and the Mountain West as a junior. (The Bulldogs joined the Mountain West in July 2012, before his junior season).

Judge was honored with a jersey retirement celebration at halftime of a Fresno State football game on November 18, 2023. The following day, the Fresno State baseball team formally retired his #29 jersey.

== Professional career ==
=== Draft and minor leagues ===
The Yankees drafted Judge in the first round of the 2013 MLB draft with the 32nd overall selection, a pick the team received as compensation after losing Nick Swisher in free agency. Judge signed with the Yankees and received a $1.8 million signing bonus. He tore a quadriceps femoris muscle while participating in a base running drill, which kept him out of the 2013 season.

Judge made his professional debut with the Charleston RiverDogs of the Class A South Atlantic League in 2014. He had a .333 batting average (6th in the league), .428 on-base percentage (OBP; 3rd), .530 slugging percentage (SLG; 6th), a .958 on-base plus slugging (OPS) and hit nine home runs with 45 RBIs in 65 games for Charleston. The Yankees promoted him to the Tampa Yankees of the Class A-Advanced Florida State League in June, where he hit .283 with a .411 OBP (2nd in the league), .442 SLG, eight home runs, and 33 RBIs in 66 games for Tampa. After the season, he played for the Scottsdale Scorpions in the Arizona Fall League, batting .278 with four home runs in 24 games.

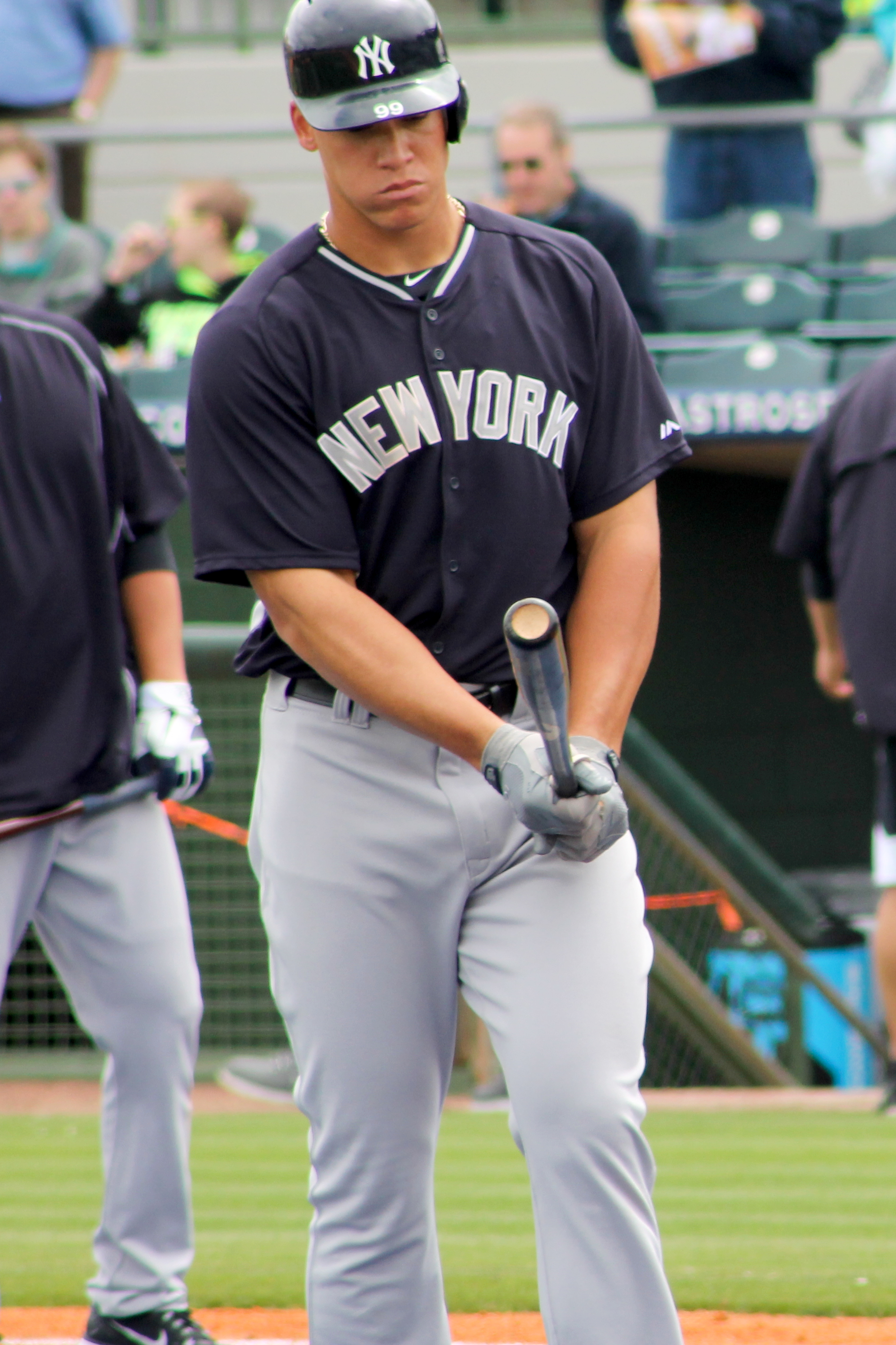
Judge during Yankees' spring training in 2015

The Yankees invited Judge to spring training as a non-roster player in 2015. He began the season with the Trenton Thunder of the Double-A Eastern League. After posting a .284/.350/.510 slash line with 12 home runs (tied for 9th in the league) in 63 games for Trenton, the Yankees promoted Judge to the Scranton/Wilkes-Barre RailRiders of the Triple-A International League in June. He was chosen to play in the 2015 All-Star Futures Game. The Yankees did not include Judge in their September call-ups. Judge batted .224/.308/.373 with eight home runs in 61 games for Scranton/Wilkes-Barre. The Yankees invited Judge to spring training in 2016, and he returned to Triple-A to began the season. Judge was named to the International League All-Star Team in 2016 but did not play in the All-Star Game after he spent a month on the disabled list due to a knee sprain. In 93 games for the RailRiders, Judge batted .270/.366/.489 with 19 home runs (4th in the league), 62 runs (tied for 8th), and 65 RBIs (tied for 7th).

=== New York Yankees (2016–present) ===
==== 2016 ====
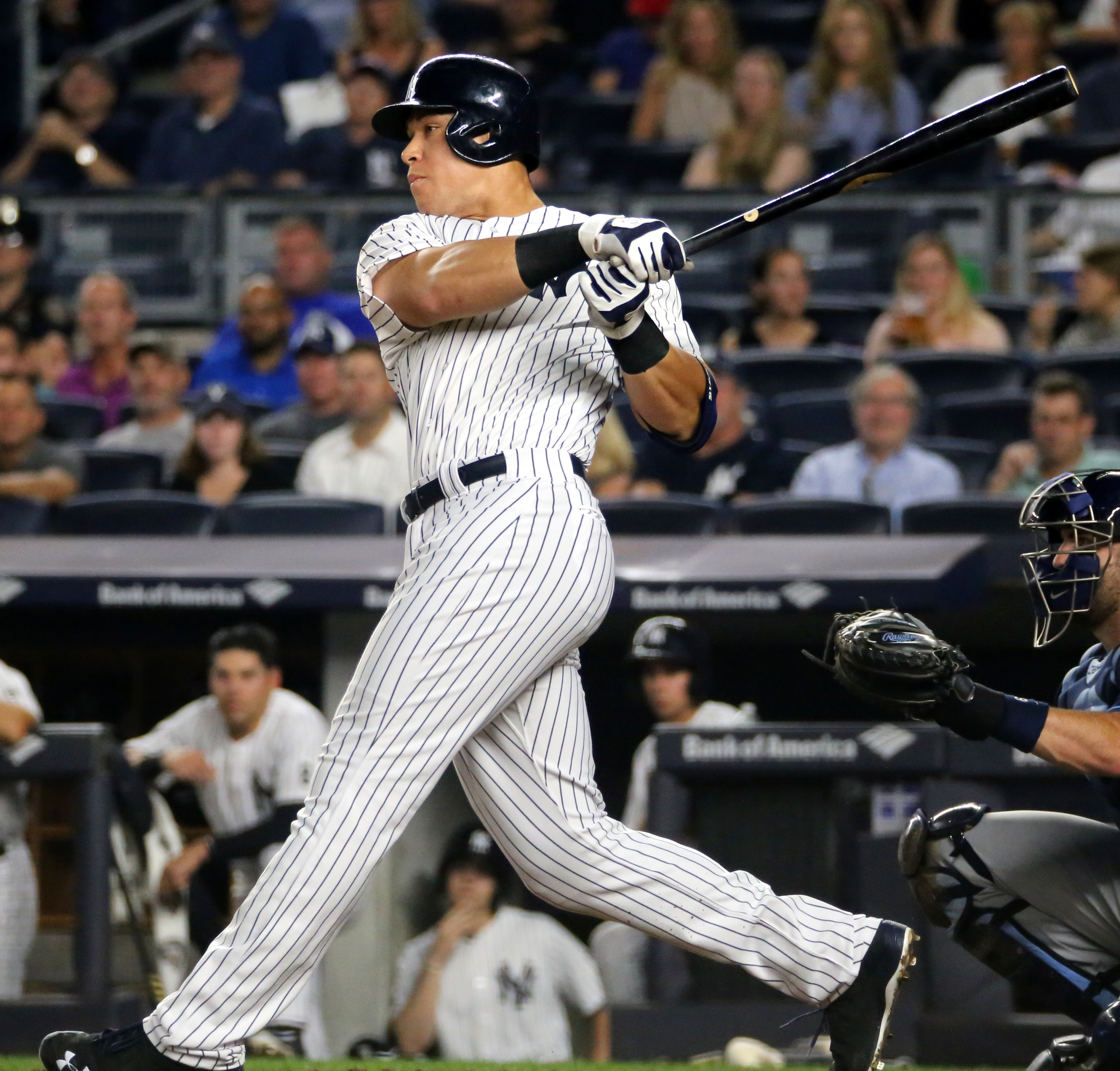
Judge batting in 2016

Judge made his MLB debut on August 13, 2016, starting in right field against the Tampa Bay Rays. In his first MLB at-bat, Judge hit a home run off Matt Andriese; the previous batter, Tyler Austin, also making his MLB debut, had done the same. This marked the first time that two teammates had hit home runs in their first MLB career at-bats in the same game. Judge also hit a home run in his second MLB game, becoming the second Yankees player, after Joe Lefebvre in 1980, to homer in each of his first two MLB games. In his debut season, Judge played in 27 games and batted .179/.263/.345 with 15 hits, four home runs, two doubles and 10 runs batted in and he struck out 42 times in 95 plate appearances. His season ended prematurely when he was placed on the 15-day disabled list with a grade two right oblique strain on September 13, 2016. The Yankees missed the 2016 postseason.

==== 2017: Rookie of the Year ====
The Yankees named Judge their Opening Day right fielder against the Tampa Bay Rays. He had his first multi-home run game on April 28 against the Baltimore Orioles to help the Yankees win 14–11, coming back from a 9–1 deficit. One of the home runs had a measured exit velocity of 119.4 miles per hour (192.2 km/h), the fastest exit velocity for a home run measured by Statcast since it was adopted in 2015. (This record would later be broken by teammate Giancarlo Stanton on August 9, 2018, when Stanton launched a home run with an exit velocity of 121.7 miles per hour (195.9 km/h).) Judge ended April with 10 home runs, tying the rookie record set by José Abreu and Trevor Story. He was named the American League's (AL) Rookie of the Month for April. In April, he had a .303 batting average, 10 home runs, 20 RBIs, and a .411 OBP in 22 games.

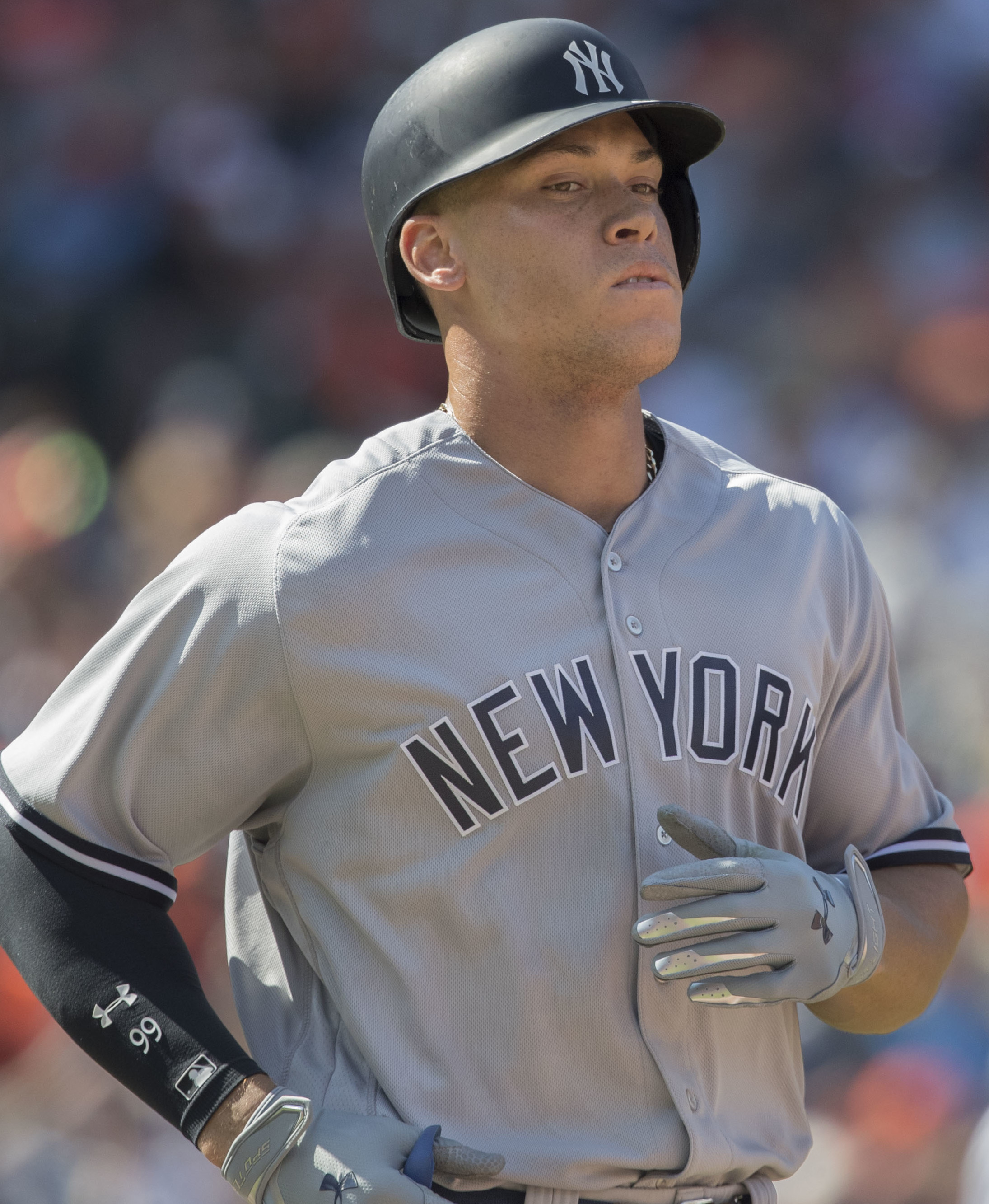
Judge with the Yankees in 2017

The Yankees debuted a cheering section in the right-field seats of Yankee Stadium on May 22. Called "The Judge's Chambers", the section spans three rows in section 104 and contains 18 seats. Fans were chosen by the team to sit there and are outfitted with black robes, wigs, and foam gavels. In a game against the Oakland Athletics on May 28, Judge hit his first career grand slam. Judge was named AL Rookie of the Month once again for May. In May, he had a .347 batting average, seven home runs, 17 RBIs, and a .441 OBP in 26 games.

On June 10, Judge hit a home run that had an exit velocity of 121.1 miles per hour (194.9 km/h), again setting a new record for the hardest measured by Statcast. The following day, Judge went 4-for-4 with two home runs; one of the home runs traveled 496 feet (151 m), the longest home run hit that season. On June 12, Judge was named the AL Player of the Week. His week ended with him leading the AL in all three Triple Crown categories. Judge was named the AL Player of the Month for June, batting .337 with 10 home runs, 25 RBIs and a .481 OBP. His performance in June also earned him his third consecutive AL Rookie of the Month award, the longest streak since Mike Trout won four in a row in 2012. Judge had a 32-game on-base streak, including reaching base in every game in June. On July 2, Judge was voted as a starting outfielder to the MLB All-Star Game, receiving 4,488,702 votes, the most of any player in the AL.

Judge broke Joe DiMaggio's record for most home runs hit by a Yankees rookie with his 30th on July 7. He became the second rookie to hit 30 home runs before the All-Star break, following Mark McGwire in 1987, and the first Yankee to do so since Alex Rodriguez in 2007. Before the All-Star break, Judge hit .329 with 30 home runs and 66 RBIs.

Judge won the Home Run Derby, besting Minnesota Twins third baseman Miguel Sanó 11–10 in the final round to become the first rookie to win the Derby outright. After his performance, MLB commissioner Rob Manfred stated that Judge is a player "who can become the face of the game". On July 21, Judge hit a home run that almost travelled out of Safeco Field. The ball was hit so hard that Statcast initially did not measure the details of the home run. (Statcast later said the home run had a 102.8 miles per hour (165.4 km/h) exit velocity but did not estimate a distance.)

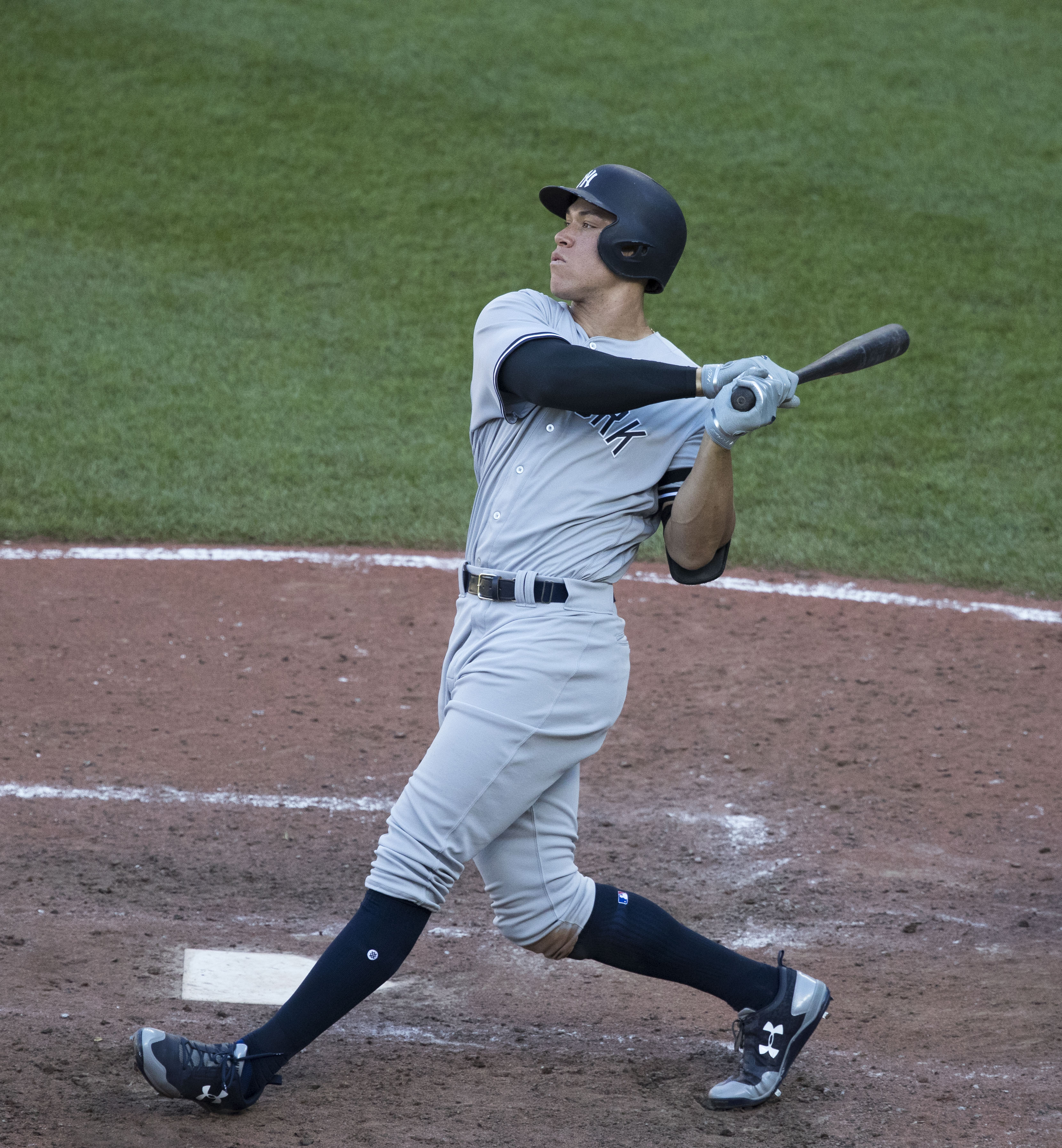
Judge at bat in 2017

On August 16, Judge hit a 457-foot (139 m) home run at Citi Field that reached the third deck. He also broke a record for position players by striking out in a 33rd consecutive game. On August 20, Judge tied pitcher Bill Stoneman's streak of striking out in 37 consecutive games.

On September 4, Judge became the first AL rookie with 100 walks in a season since Al Rosen in 1950, and the first MLB rookie to do so since Jim Gilliam in 1953. On September 10, Judge walked for the 107th time, the most walks by a rookie in a season since Ted Williams in 1939. During the same game, he also became the second rookie in MLB history to hit 40 home runs in a season since McGwire (1987). He joined Babe Ruth (1920), Lou Gehrig (1927), Joe DiMaggio (1937) and Mickey Mantle (1956) as the only Yankees to hit 40 home runs in a season at age 25 or younger.

On September 25, Judge hit his 49th and 50th home runs, tying and surpassing Mark McGwire's single-season rookie home run record. On September 30, Judge hit his 52nd home run of the season and his 33rd at Yankee Stadium, surpassing Babe Ruth's single-season record (set in 1921) for most home runs hit by a Yankees player at his home ballpark. After the conclusion of September, Judge won AL Player of the Month for the second time and Rookie of the Month for the fourth time.

Judge appeared in 155 games and finished the regular season slashing .284/.422/.627 with 154 hits, 52 home runs, three triples, 24 doubles, 114 RBI, 127 walks, 11 intentional walks and nine stolen bases. He led the AL in home runs, runs scored (128), and walks (a major-league rookie record 127). He ranked second in the league in RBIs. He also struck out an MLB-leading 208 times, breaking the Yankees record previously set by Curtis Granderson in 2012 and a rookie record previously set by Kris Bryant in 2015.

With the Yankees finishing the year with a 91–71 record, the team clinched a Wild Card in the postseason. During the Wild Card Game against the Minnesota Twins, Judge hit a home run en route to an 8–4 Yankees victory. In Game 3 of the AL Division Series (ALDS), Judge robbed Francisco Lindor of a home run, preserving the tie game. Judge struck out 16 times in the series, setting an ALDS record. After the Yankees defeated the Cleveland Indians in the ALDS, Judge hit three home runs for the Yankees in the AL Championship Series (ALCS). He also robbed Yulieski Gurriel of a potential home run in the Yankees' Game 7 ALCS loss to the Houston Astros. He finished with 27 strikeouts in the postseason, a major league record at the time. (Note: This record was broken by Cody Bellinger in game 7 of the 2017 World Series just 11 days later.)

End-of-season awards for Judge included selection as an outfielder on Baseball America's All-MLB Team, the Players Choice Award for Outstanding AL Rookie, and a Silver Slugger Award. Judge was unanimously voted as the AL Rookie of the Year. He went on to finish second in the voting for the AL Most Valuable Player Award to Jose Altuve, receiving two out of 30 first place votes.

On November 21, it was revealed that Judge had undergone arthroscopic surgery in his left shoulder for a cartilage cleanup, an injury dating back to April of that year.

==== 2018 ====
On March 31, Judge made his first career start at center field in the majors. At 6 feet 7 inches (2.01 m) tall and weighing 282 pounds (128 kg), he became the tallest and heaviest player in baseball history to play the position.

Batting .277 with 25 home runs and 58 RBIs, Judge was named a starting outfielder for the All-Star Game. Judge hit a solo home run off National League starter Max Scherzer.

On July 26, a 93 mph fastball by Kansas City Royals pitcher Jakob Junis hit Judge on his right wrist and he left the game. Later, an MRI/CT scan revealed that he suffered a fractured ulnar styloid bone in his wrist. No surgery was required, and initial reports gave a three-week timetable for Judge to recover. The injury took longer to heal than expected, with Judge missing close to two months. On September 18, Judge returned to the starting lineup. He finished the season with a .278 batting average, 27 home runs, and 67 RBIs in 112 games. The Yankees beat the Oakland Athletics in the Wild Card Game but were defeated, three games to one, by the Red Sox in the ALDS.

==== 2019 ====
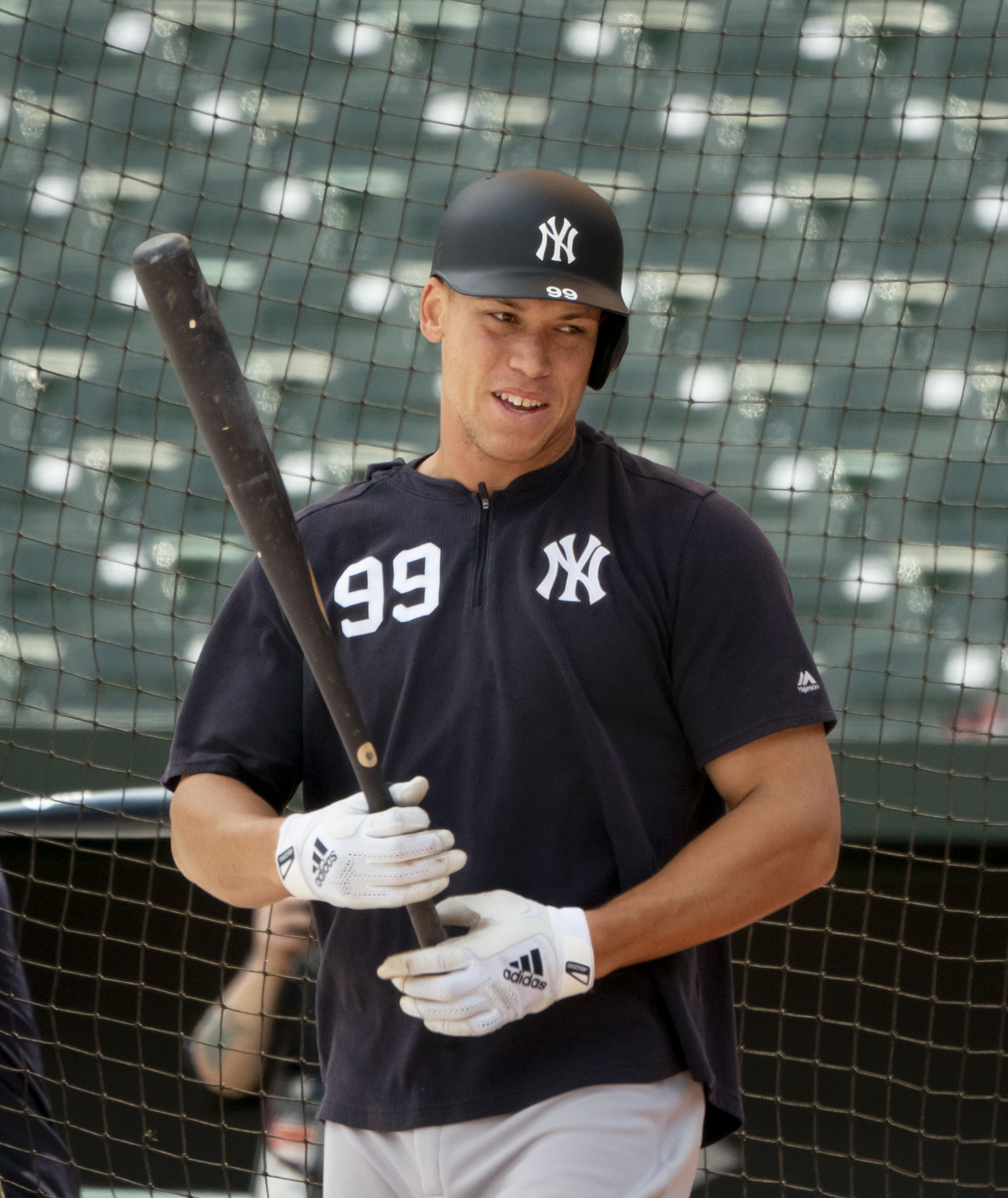
Judge during batting practice in 2019

Judge started the season off with a .288 batting average, five home runs, and 11 RBIs in his first 20 games. However, on April 20, Judge suffered a left oblique strain while hitting a single in the sixth inning against the Kansas City Royals. He did not play again until June 21.

On August 27, Judge hit his 17th home run of the season and 100th home run of his career. Coming in his 371st game, it made him the third-fastest MLB player to hit 100 home runs.

Judge hit a home run over Fenway Park's Green Monster for the first time on September 8. With this home run, the 2019 Yankees set a new franchise record for team home runs in a season.

In 2019, Judge batted .272/.381/.540, with 103 hits, 27 home runs, one triple,18 doubles and 55 RBIs in 447 plate appearances across 102 games. He had the fastest average exit velocity on balls hit in play among major leaguers at 95.9 mph (154.3 km/h). He led the league in defensive runs saved as a right fielder (19 runs saved, tied with Cody Bellinger) but did so in fewer innings (775 1/3 compared to 911 1/3 for Bellinger). Judge earned the Wilson Defensive Player of the Year Award for his position in right field.

==== 2020 ====
During spring training in March, Judge felt soreness in his pectoral area. It was revealed that he had suffered a stress fracture in his ribs and was shut down for at least two weeks. However, the start of the season was delayed until July.

Judge began the shortened 2020 season with five consecutive games with a home run (6 during the span), launching a 419-feet, 108 mph three-run shot off of Boston Red Sox pitcher Matt Hall. His streak ended on August 3 when he went 2-for-4 without a home run. It was the longest home run streak by a Yankees player since Alex Rodriguez (September 4–9, 2007). On August 14, Judge was placed on the 10-day injured list with a right calf strain. On August 26, he was again placed on the 10-day injured list after straining the same calf the day he returned against the Atlanta Braves. He finished the season slashing .257/.336/.554 with 26 hits, nine home runs, three doubles and 22 RBIs over 28 games. In the playoffs, he batted 4-for-30 with 3 home runs and 5 RBI as the Yankees lost to Tampa Bay in the ALDS.

==== 2021 ====
During the week of May 10–16, Judge earned his fourth career AL Player of the Week Award. Judge had a slash line of .571/.640/1.333 with eight runs scored, 12 hits, a double, five home runs, six RBIs, and three walks in six games (five multi-hit games and his 13th career multi-homer game). He also hit his 130th career home run, the second-most in MLB history through 460 career games, trailing only Ryan Howard (142). On May 23, Judge recorded his first career walk-off RBI, taking a walk on a 3–1 pitch from Liam Hendriks of the Chicago White Sox.

On July 9, Judge recorded his 500th career hit during a game against the Houston Astros by hitting a double to left field off pitcher Brandon Bielak. He became the second-fastest Yankee to 500 hits and 100 home runs. He accomplished the feat in his 506th game, with only Joe DiMaggio getting there faster, at 395 games.

Judge was named the starting right fielder in the All-Star Game. Following the All-Star Game, Judge was placed on the COVID-19 injured list after testing positive for the virus. Judge returned against the Tampa Bay Rays on July 27.

On August 12, in the Field of Dreams game in Iowa, Judge hit two multiple-run home runs. He also hit two home runs on September 11 against the New York Mets with his 31st and 32nd home runs. On October 3, the last game of the regular season, Judge recorded his first career walk-off hit, a single that scored Tyler Wade to beat Tampa Bay 1–0 and clinch a Wild Card spot for the Yankees. In the Wild Card Game, Judge became the first Yankee to be ruled out at home plate on a hit in a winner-take-all game.

Judge finished the 2021 season batting .287/.373/.544 with 158 hits, 39 home runs, 24 doubles, 98 RBI, 75 walks, two intentional walks, and six stolen bases. After the season, Judge won a Fielding Bible Award for his defensive excellence and his second Silver Slugger Award. On November 23, Judge was named to the First Team of the All-MLB Team as an outfielder. He finished fourth in AL MVP voting.

==== 2022: AL home run record, MVP ====
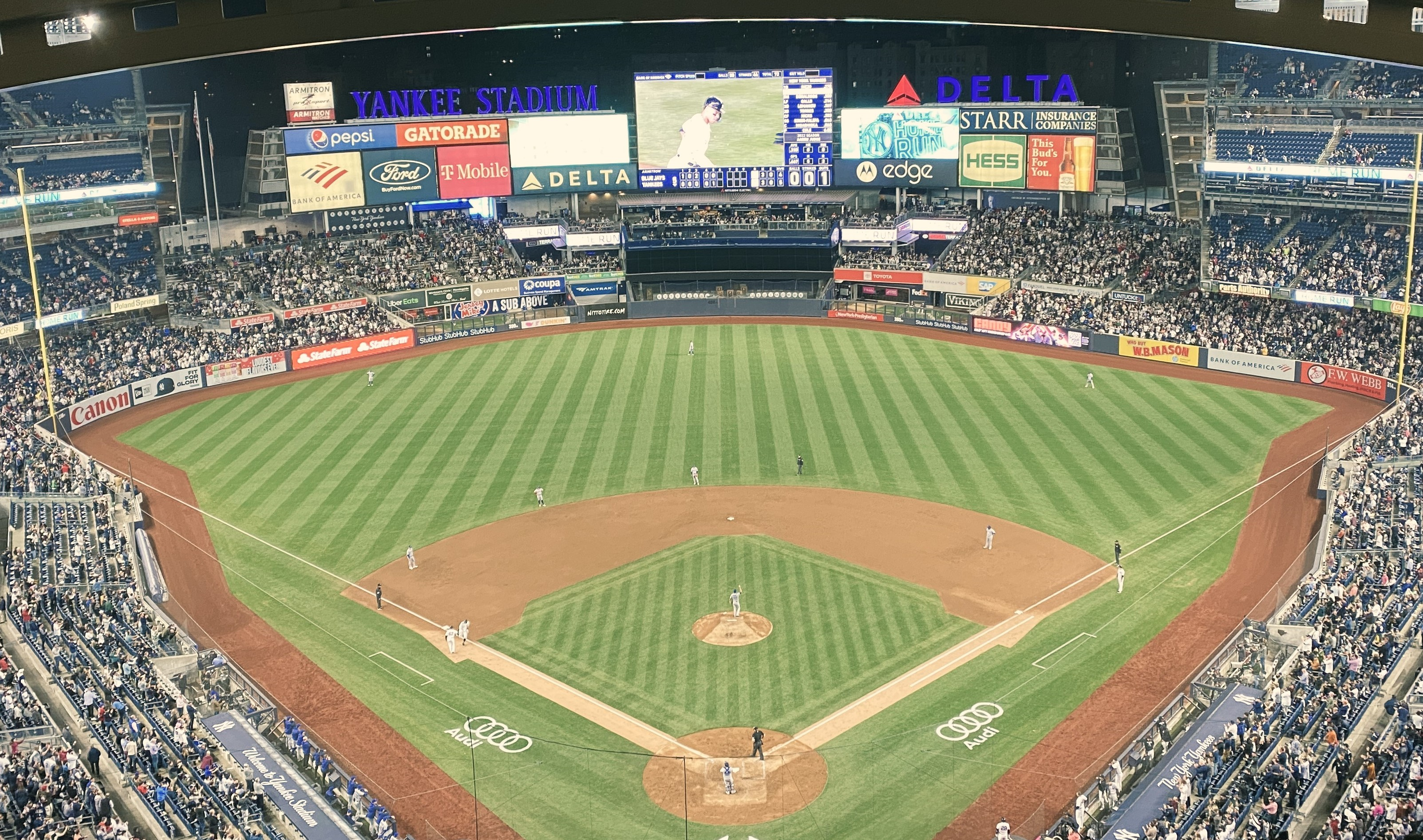
Judge (near third base) circles the bases at Yankee Stadium after his first home run of the 2022 season.

Before the 2022 Yankees season, Judge and the Yankees were unsuccessful in negotiating a long-term contract. General manager Brian Cashman told ESPN that the team offered Judge $17 million in arbitration and a seven-year extension worth $213.5 million. Judge avoided salary arbitration and signed a one-year, $19 million contract on June 24, with additional $250,000 bonuses for winning each of the MVP Award and the World Series MVP Award.

Judge slashed .293/.361/.600 with six home runs in April. He hit his first career walk-off home run on May 10 off Toronto Blue Jays closer Jordan Romano. Judge won the AL Player of the Month Award for May. During the month, Judge slashed .311/.378/.699 with 12 home runs. He hit his second walk-off home run on June 26 against the Houston Astros.

Judge was elected as a starter for the All-Star Game, receiving the most fan votes of any player in the AL. This was his second consecutive and fourth overall All-Star selection.

Judge slugged his third walk-off homer for the season against the visiting Kansas City Royals on July 28, tying Mickey Mantle for most by a Yankee in a season. Judge won back-to-back AL Player of the Week Awards for the weeks ending July 24 and 31. Judge also claimed the AL Player of the Month Award for July after batting .333/.436/.806 with 13 home runs.

On July 30, Judge became the second-fastest player in MLB history to hit 200 home runs (behind Ryan Howard), launching a two-run shot off of Jon Heasley of the Kansas City Royals. On August 29, during a game against the Los Angeles Angels, Judge hit his 50th home run for the season, coming off reliever Ryan Tepera. He became only the tenth player in MLB history and third player in Yankees franchise history to record multiple 50 home run seasons.

Judge hit his 55th home run during the first game of a doubleheader against the Minnesota Twins on September 7 off rookie starting pitcher Louie Varland. He became the fourth player in MLB history to hit at least 55 home runs and steal at least 15 bases in a season, joining Babe Ruth (1921), Sammy Sosa (1998), and Ken Griffey Jr. (1997–98). On September 18 against the Milwaukee Brewers, Judge equaled Hank Greenberg and Sosa's record of 11 multiple home run games in an MLB season, hitting his 58th and 59th home runs, while also tying and surpassing Greenberg (1938) and Jimmie Foxx (1932) for the AL single-season record for most home runs by a right-handed batter. Judge's 60th home run came on September 20.

On September 28, Judge hit his 61st home run off Tim Mayza of the Toronto Blue Jays, tying Roger Maris for the most home runs in a single season in AL history. In the second game of a doubleheader (and the Yankees' second-to-last regular season game) against the Texas Rangers at Globe Life Field on October 4, Judge hit his 62nd home run off Jesús Tinoco, setting the new single-season AL home run record. Judge was selected as the AL Player of the Week for the week of September 29–October 5. He claimed his third AL Player of the Month Award of the season in September. He batted .417/.565/.869 for September.

In 2022, Judge led the major leagues with 62 home runs, 133 runs scored, 131 RBI (tied with Pete Alonso of the Mets), 111 walks, and batted .311/.425/.686 with 177 hits, 28 doubles, and 19 intentional walks, while stealing 16 bases in 19 attempts, in 157 games. He was denied the AL triple crown, as Luis Arráez of the Minnesota Twins had a batting average that was five points higher than Judge's.

Judge won the AL MVP Award, earning 28 of 30 first-place votes. He was also named to the All-MLB Team. Judge's 2022 campaign is considered one of the best offensive seasons in major league history. On December 30, he was voted the Associated Press (AP) "Male Athlete of the Year" by a panel of 40 sports writers and editors from news outlets throughout the United States. Judge just edged out Los Angeles Angels two-way star and 2021's winner Shohei Ohtani in voting. Judge was also selected as the Time Magazine Athlete of the Year.

The Yankees qualified for the postseason, facing the Cleveland Guardians in the ALDS, where Judge slashed .200/.238/.500 with two home runs, as the Yankees defeated the Guardians in five games. In the ALCS, Judge hit just .063/.118/.063 with one hit and a walk as the Yankees were swept in four games by the Houston Astros, who would go on to win the World Series.

After the 2022 season, Judge became a free agent. The Yankees extended the qualifying offer of a one-year contract worth $19.65 million to Judge, but he declined. During free agency, he was pursued by the San Diego Padres and San Francisco Giants as well as the Yankees. By early December 2022, the Padres offered Judge over $400 million, according to Judge's agent. The Yankees were only offering $320 million over eight years. A new deal with the Yankees was created in a phone call between Judge and Yankees owner Hal Steinbrenner, when Steinbrenner offered to add a ninth year and an additional $40 million. That became the foundation of an agreement that the Yankees, and Judge signed on December 20, 2022, with the nine-year, $360 million deal breaking the record for the largest free agent deal in MLB history. In a press conference on the following day, Steinbrenner named Judge the 16th captain of the Yankees and the first since Derek Jeter had retired eight years earlier.

==== 2023 ====
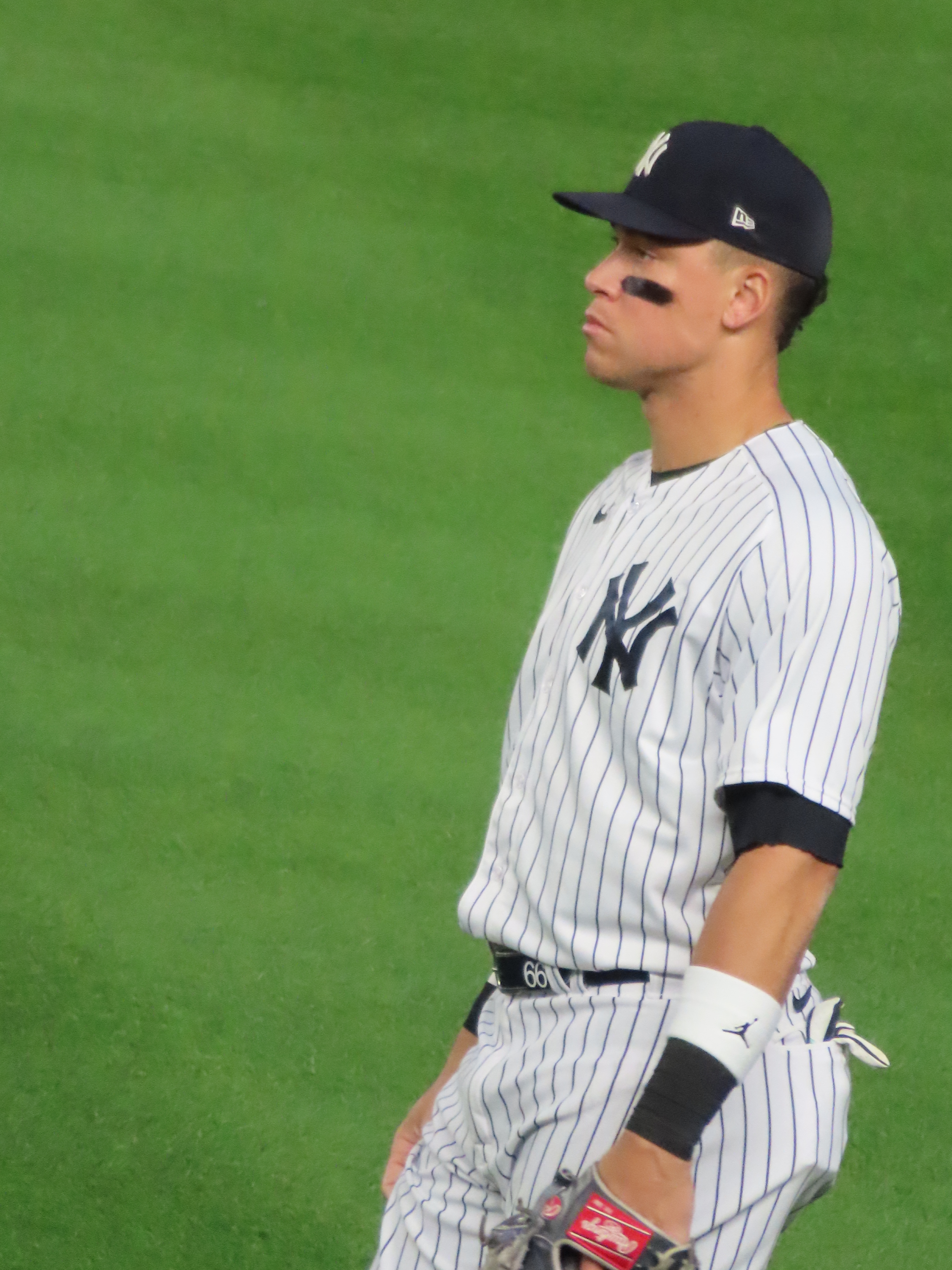
Judge with the Yankees in 2023

On 2023 MLB Opening Day at Yankee Stadium, Judge hit his first home run of the year off San Francisco Giants ace Logan Webb into Monument Park. Judge went on the 10-day injured list after a mild hip strain suffered while sliding into base playing against the Minnesota Twins at Target Field on April 26. Judge returned against the Oakland Athletics on May 9.

Judge received the AL Player of the Week Award for the week of May 15–21. Despite missing the first week of games in May, Judge also won the AL Player of the Month Award for May after batting .342/.474/.882 with 12 home runs in 21 games.

On June 3, Judge crashed through a closed gate in the outfield wall at Dodger Stadium while recording a fly out off JD Martinez, causing a sprain to his toe and leading to him missing 42 games, with the Yankees going 19–23 in his absence. Despite the injury, Judge was elected to the All Star Game but was unable to participate, and he was replaced in the lineup by the Texas Rangers' Adolis Garcia. Judge returned against the Baltimore Orioles at Camden Yards on July 28.

On August 23, Judge hit three home runs, including a grand slam, against the Washington Nationals at Yankee Stadium. He repeated the feat at home against the Arizona Diamondbacks less than a month later on September 22, becoming the first Yankee to homer three times in a game twice in a season. Judge won his second AL Player of the Week Award of the season on September 24.

On September 2, Judge hit his 250th career home run (30th of the season) off of Astros ace Justin Verlander in the fifth inning. It was his 810th career game, setting a new record as the fastest player to reach 250 home runs in MLB history, passing marks previously set by Ryan Howard (855 games) and Ralph Kiner (871 games).

Despite missing 56 games, Judge hit 37 home runs in 2023, putting him on a 55 home run pace had he played a full season. He slashed .267/.406/.613, from 106 games, his second consecutive year with an OPS over 1.000 and his third overall. He had 98 hits, 16 doubles, 75 RBI, 88 walks, 9 intentional walks, and 3 stolen bases (caught stealing once). The Yankees finished the regular season in fourth place in the AL East and missed the playoffs for the first time since 2016.

Judge received the Roberto Clemente Award before Game 3 of the World Series. The award acknowledged his exemplary character and charity work promoting responsible youth and civic citizenship in New York and California through his ALL RISE Foundation. Judge was also selected to the All-MLB Team for the third successive year, this time to the second team. He finished 15th in AL MVP voting.

As captain, Judge appeared to take a more hands-on approach towards the Yankees organization, having conversations with Steinbrenner about the team direction and potential changes following the Yankees missing the postseason.

==== 2024: Second MVP, AL pennant ====
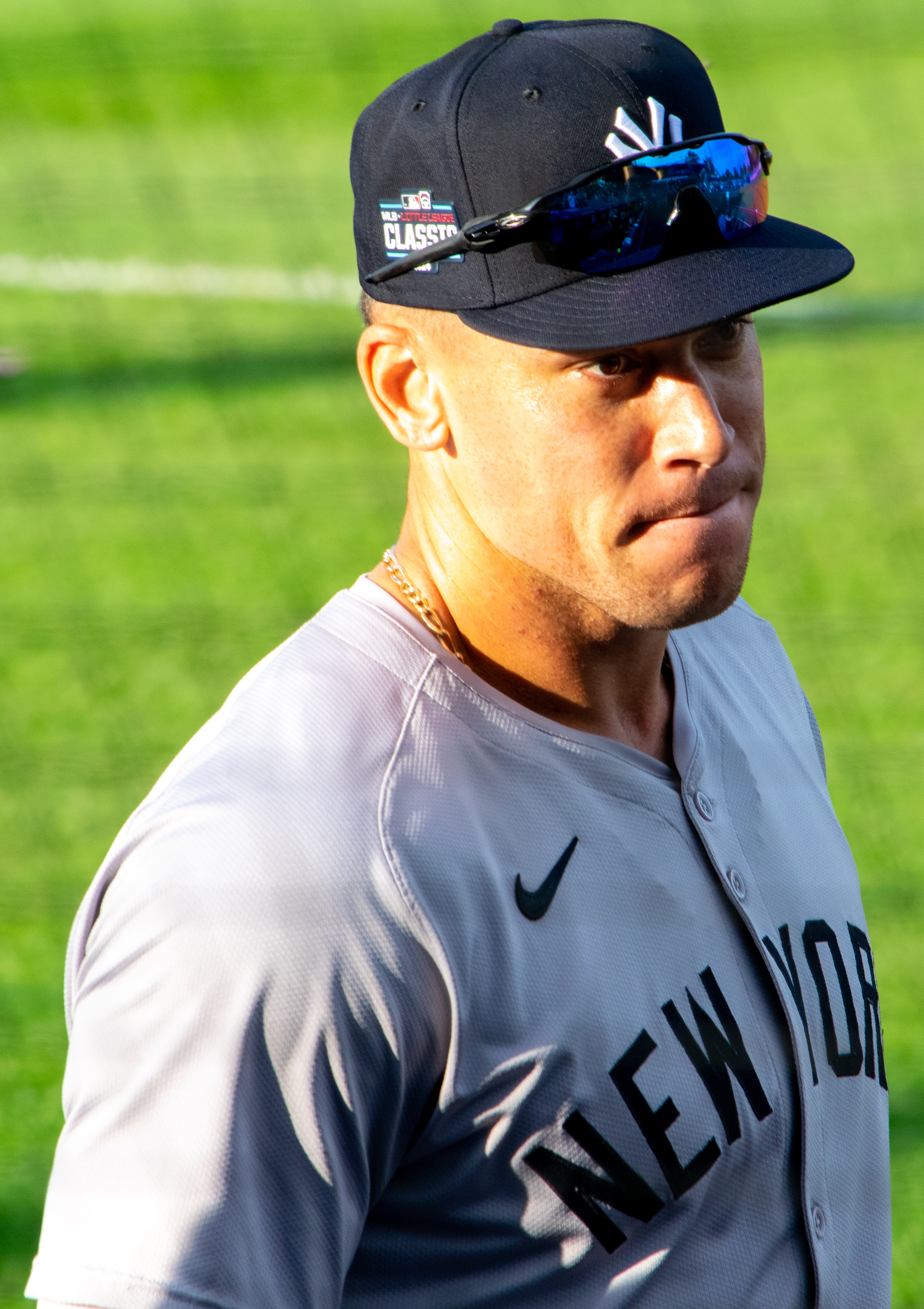
Judge in 2024

Following an injury-interrupted spring training, Judge started the 2024 season slowly, hitting .180 through the first three weeks of April. Judge primarily played at center field early in the season but also made his first major league appearance in left field when Alex Verdugo was on paternity leave. By late April, Judge appeared more comfortable and improved his performance at the plate, collecting eight hits and three home runs along with six walks in the final week of the month.

Judge was selected as the AL Player of the Week for the week of May 19, after going 10-for-20 and slugging 1.200 with three home runs and five doubles in this period. Judge was also selected as the AL Player of the Month for May, having hit 14 home runs and 12 doubles in the month, with 27 RBI, slashing .361/.479/.918. This marked Judge's seventh AL Player of the Month selection, and his third consecutive May honor. Judge also completed a homecoming of sorts, playing his first series at Oracle Park against the San Francisco Giants, where he went 6-for-10 with three home runs and six RBI as the Yankees swept the series. By the end of May, Judge improved his season slash line to .277/.405/.643, with an OPS of 1.048.

For the week ending June 9, Judge received his second AL Player of the Week award for 2024. In the six-game homestand split against the Minnesota Twins and Los Angeles Dodgers, Judge slashed .500/.630/1.200 with three home runs and 12 RBI. Following a 3-for-4 game against the Dodgers on June 9, Judge raised his season batting average to over .300 for the first time. At end of June, Judge led the majors in home runs (31), RBI (82), and OPS (1.144), and he was second in the AL in batting average (.316) among qualified hitters. Judge won the AL Player of the Month Award again in June, for the second consecutive month, slashing .409/.514/.864, with 11 home runs and 37 RBI for the month.

On June 27, Judge was announced as a starting outfielder for the AL in the All-Star Game, having received the most votes. This was the second time in three seasons that he received the most All-Star votes.

On August 14, batting against Chad Kuhl of the Chicago White Sox, Judge hit his 300th career home run in the Yankees' 10–2 victory. He became the fastest player to ever hit 300 home runs, taking him 955 games and 3,431 at-bats, surpassing both Ralph Kiner's record by 132 games and Babe Ruth's by 400 at-bats. He became the second hitter to record his 300th home run prior to his 1,000th hit. He hit his 50th and 51st home runs of the season on August 25, becoming the fifth player in MLB history with three-plus seasons of 50 or more home runs. Judge was named the AL Player of the Week for the week of August 19–25, following a strong homestand against the Cleveland Guardians and Colorado Rockies. On August 26, Judge collected his 1,000th career hit, a line-drive single to right field against José Ferrer at Nationals Park. Judge received the August AL Player of the Month Award, his third monthly award of the season, after slashing .389/.530/.856.

On September 13, Judge hit a go-ahead grand slam at Yankee Stadium against the Boston Red Sox. This ended a 16-game homerless streak, the longest of his major league career. Judge ended the regular season slashing .322/.458/.701, with 180 hits, 58 home runs, one triple, 36 doubles, 144 RBI, 133 walks, 20 intentional walks and 10 stolen bases from 155 games.

The Yankees won the ALCS against the Cleveland Guardians in five games in which Judge hit two home runs and notched five RBIs. In his first World Series, Judge went 1-for-12 with seven strikeouts in the first three games of the series as the Yankees fell into a 3–0 series deficit. In Game 5, Judge hit his first World Series home run as the Yankees jumped out to a 5–0 lead, but a series of defensive mistakes, including Judge's first error of the year, allowed the lead to slip away as the Yankees lost the game 7–6, and thus the series in five games. After the season, Judge won the AL MVP Award. He became the second Yankee player to win the award unanimously, following Mickey Mantle in 1956.

==== 2025: Third MVP ====
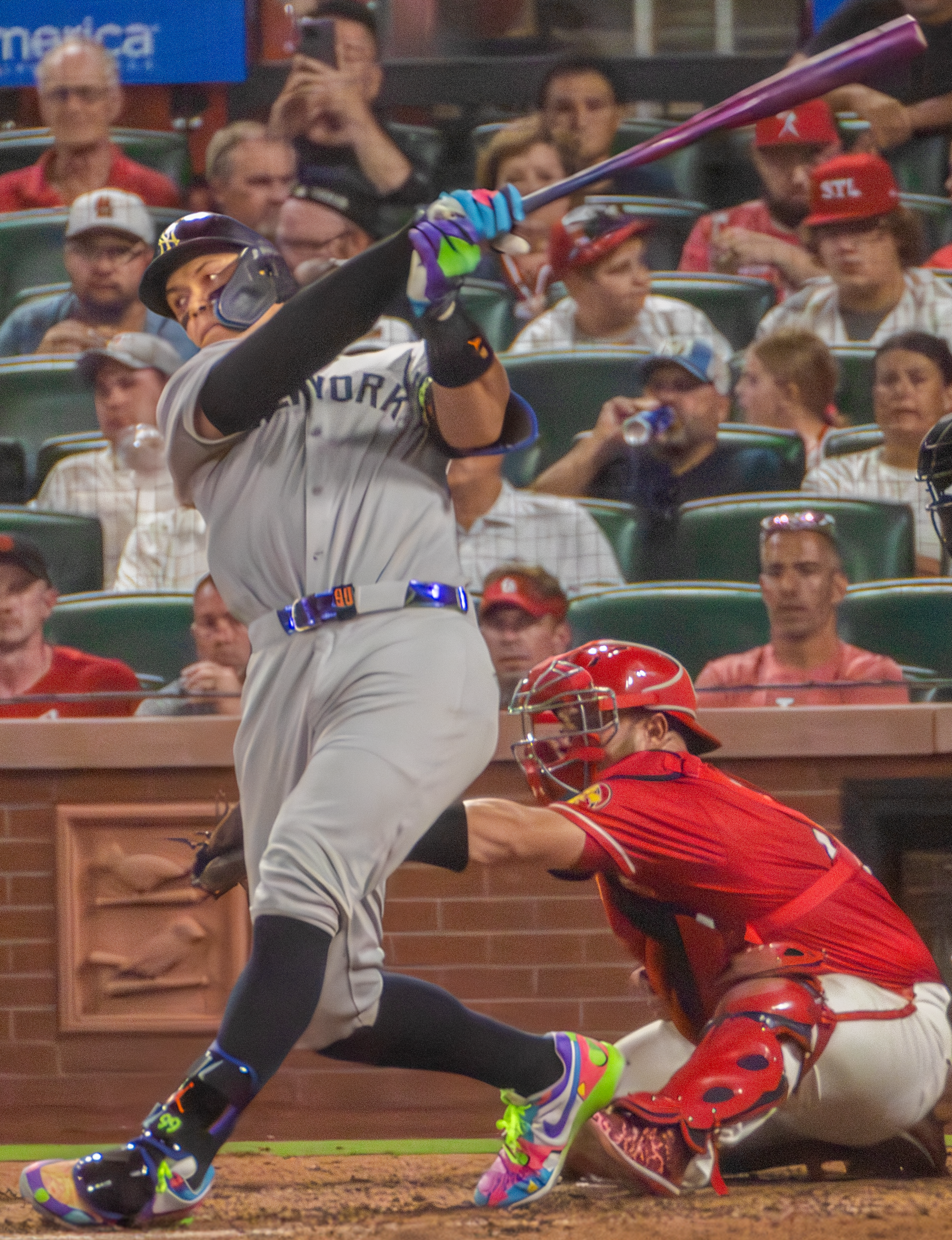
Judge in 2025

On March 29, Judge hit three home runs and a double with eight RBI against the Milwaukee Brewers, his third career three-homer game. On March 31, Judge was named the AL Player of the Week for the opening week of the season after going 6-for-11 and slugging 1.818 with four home runs and 11 RBI.

On April 3, Judge hit his 500th career extra-base hit with a first-inning, three-run home run off the Arizona Diamondbacks' Merrill Kelly. Judge became the third-fastest Yankee to reach the milestone in terms of games played, having done so in his 999th game. In the same game, Judge became the first player in MLB history with five home runs and 15 RBI in his team's first six games of the season. On April 4 against the Pittsburgh Pirates, playing in his 1,000th game for the Yankees, Judge registered his 321st home run, equaling Babe Ruth's record for home runs in his first 1,000 Yankees games. By the end of April, Judge was slashing .427/.521/.761 with 10 home runs and 32 RBI. Judge won with the AL Player of the Month Award for April, the tenth of his career. On May 30 against the Los Angeles Dodgers, Judge and Shohei Ohtani became the first reigning MVPs ever to each hit a home run in the first inning of the same game. Judge was named the AL Player of the Month again in May, after slashing .364/.453/.798, with 11 home runs on the month. His 11th career monthly award is the most in AL history, surpassing Alex Rodriguez.

On June 26, Judge was announced as a starting outfielder for the AL in the All-Star Game, having received the most votes for the third time in four seasons and the second straight year. On July 12, Judge hit his 350th career home run against the Chicago Cubs; he accomplished this in 1,088 games, breaking the record of 1,280 games by Mark McGwire. On July 27, Judge was placed on the 10-day injury list with a flexor strain in his right elbow, following discomfort while throwing from the outfield against the Toronto Blue Jays. He was reactivated on August 5, mostly appearing as designated hitter in the following month, before making more regular appearances in the outfield from mid-September. On September 9 against the Detroit Tigers, Judge hit his 359th home run, passing Yogi Berra for fifth place on the Yankees all-time home run list.

On September 11, two more home runs against the Tigers brought his total to 361, tying Joe DiMaggio for fourth all-time in Yankees history. The next day, he passed DiMaggio with his 362nd against the Red Sox. This was his 19th first-inning home run of the season, breaking a tie with Alex Rodriguez (2001) and his own mark from 2024 for the most home runs by a player in a single inning in a season. On September 15, Judge was named the AL Player of the Week after going 9-for-20 with a 1.760 OPS, five home runs, and five RBI. On September 24, he hit two home runs against the Chicago White Sox, bringing him to the 50 home run mark in a season for the fourth time, tying Babe Ruth, Mark McGwire, and Sammy Sosa for the most such seasons in MLB history. Judge and Ruth are the only Yankees to have consecutive years of 50 or more homers. On September 29, Judge was named the AL Player of the Week after going 9-for-20 with four home runs, nine RBI and an OPS of 1.693. He also won the AL Player of the Month for September after slashing .391/.440/.772 with 10 home runs.

Judge finished the regular season with a .331 batting average, leading the major leagues, and winning his first career batting title. At 6 feet 7 inches, he became the tallest batting champion in MLB history. He slashed .331/.457/.688 with 53 home runs, 179 hits, two triples, 30 doubles, 114 RBI, 124 walks, 36 intentional walks, and 12 stolen bases in 152 games. His 53 home runs were the most ever by a batting champion. Judge's 36 intentional walks broke the AL single-season record, overtaking Ted Williams' record of 34 set in the 1957 season.

In the AL Wild Card Series against the Boston Red Sox, Judge went 4-for-11 with one walk and one RBI. On October 7 at Yankee Stadium, with the Yankees facing being swept in the AL Division Series by the Toronto Blue Jays, Judge went 3-for-4 and hit the tying three-run home run off the foul pole as the Yankees came back from a 6–1 run deficit to keep the series alive. This effort answered some of the lingering criticism of his previously underwhelming postseason performances, which had amplified after he had struck out with the bases loaded in the series opener. Judge ended the postseason slashing .500/.581/.692 with 13 hits, one home run, two doubles and seven RBI across seven games as the Yankees were eliminated by the Blue Jays in four games.

Judge won his third career and second consecutive AL MVP award. In a tight race, Judge received 17 first-place votes, four more than Cal Raleigh.

==== 2026 ====
Judge began the 2026 MLB season by striking out four times against the San Francisco Giants on Opening Night. On April 14, Judge hit two home runs against the Los Angeles Angels at Yankee Stadium. On May 24, Judge hit his fourth career walk-off home run to defeat the Tampa Bay Rays, ending a career-high 11 game homerless streak. On June 5, Judge was diagnosed with a stress fracture on the right side of his first rib, which was suspected to have been suffered during a game against the Houston Astros approximately six weeks previously. He was placed on the ten-day injured list from June 2 and was expected to miss at least four weeks. Despite the injury Judge was still elected as a starter for the 2026 Major League Baseball All-Star Game. He was transferred to the 60-day injured list on July 18. After months of rehab, Judge was activated off the IL on September 7, ahead of a series against the Colorado Rockies. However, on September 22, Judge went back on the injured list due to a right calf strain.

== International career ==
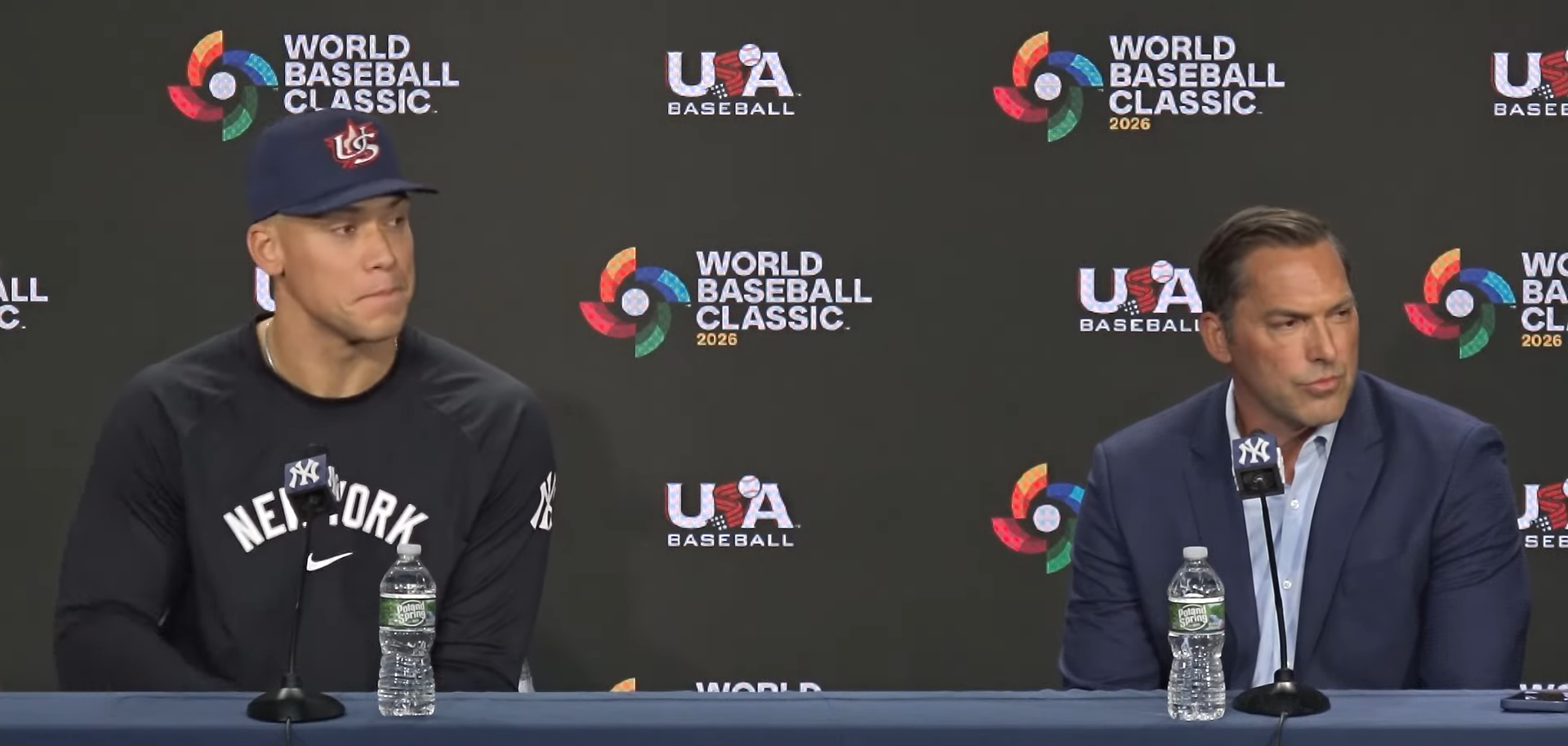
Judge (left) being announced as captain of the United States national baseball team ahead of the 2026 World Baseball Classic during a press conference with Mark DeRosa in April 2025

Judge did not compete in the 2023 World Baseball Classic (WBC), choosing instead to focus on preparing for his season with the Yankees, given his recent contract and captaincy.

On April 14, 2025, Judge was named captain of Team USA ahead of the 2026 WBC. Manager Mark DeRosa announced the decision on MLB Network, with Judge joining the broadcast to express his excitement: "Now, getting a chance to have 'USA' across my chest and represent all the great people in our country and represent what this country means, it's a great opportunity. I never had this opportunity before, even growing up as a kid, so I'm definitely looking forward to it."

At the WBC, Judge posted a slash line of .222/.364/.481, slugging two home runs with five RBIs and six hits across seven games. Highlights included homering on his very first swing of the tournament — a 405-foot, 106.5 mph two-run blast against Brazil — and a pair of standout defensive plays from right field, throwing out runners attempting to advance to third base. He threw out Joey Ortiz against Mexico in pool play, then did the same to Fernando Tatis Jr. against the Dominican Republic in the semi-final game with his throw clocked at 95.7 mph.

Judge and Team USA advanced to the championship game against Venezuela, but fell short by a score of 3–2, marking back-to-back runner-up finishes for the U.S. in the WBC. The offense for the U.S. went quiet in the game, with Judge going 0-for-4 with three strikeouts.

== Player profile ==
Judge is listed at 6 feet 7 inches (2.01 m) and 282 pounds (128 kg). Due to his large size and strength, he has elicited comparisons to teammate Giancarlo Stanton, as well as former MLB players Richie Sexson, Dave Winfield, and Willie Stargell.

His power output is historically significant: he is one of only eight players in MLB history to record an OPS+ above 200 in three seasons. He is also one of just 14 players in MLB history to slug above .700 in a season with a minimum of 550 plate appearances. He is the fourth player ever to produce four seasons with 50 or more home runs, alongside Ruth, Sammy Sosa, and Mark McGwire. Since Statcast began tracking exit velocity in 2015, Judge broke the record for the hardest-hit home run with a 121.1 mph blast on June 10, 2017, against the Baltimore Orioles; although later surpassed, it ranked fifth as of 2025. Judge and Miguel Sanó are the only MLB players since 2015 to hit multiple home runs measuring at least 495 feet.

=== Pregame rituals ===
Judge has been credited as a team leader both on and off the field.

He has a number of rituals before, during, and after games. According to Michael Kay (as discussed during The Michael Kay Show), before each game at Yankee Stadium, Judge ceremoniously tosses exactly 40 sunflower seeds in the grass behind home plate (one for each man on the Yankees extended roster.) The prayer he recites after he tosses the seeds is unknown to the public.

During his 2017 rookie season, Judge kept a note on his phone that read ".179", his batting average with the Yankees in 2016, and looked at it daily as a source of motivation.

=== Uniform ===
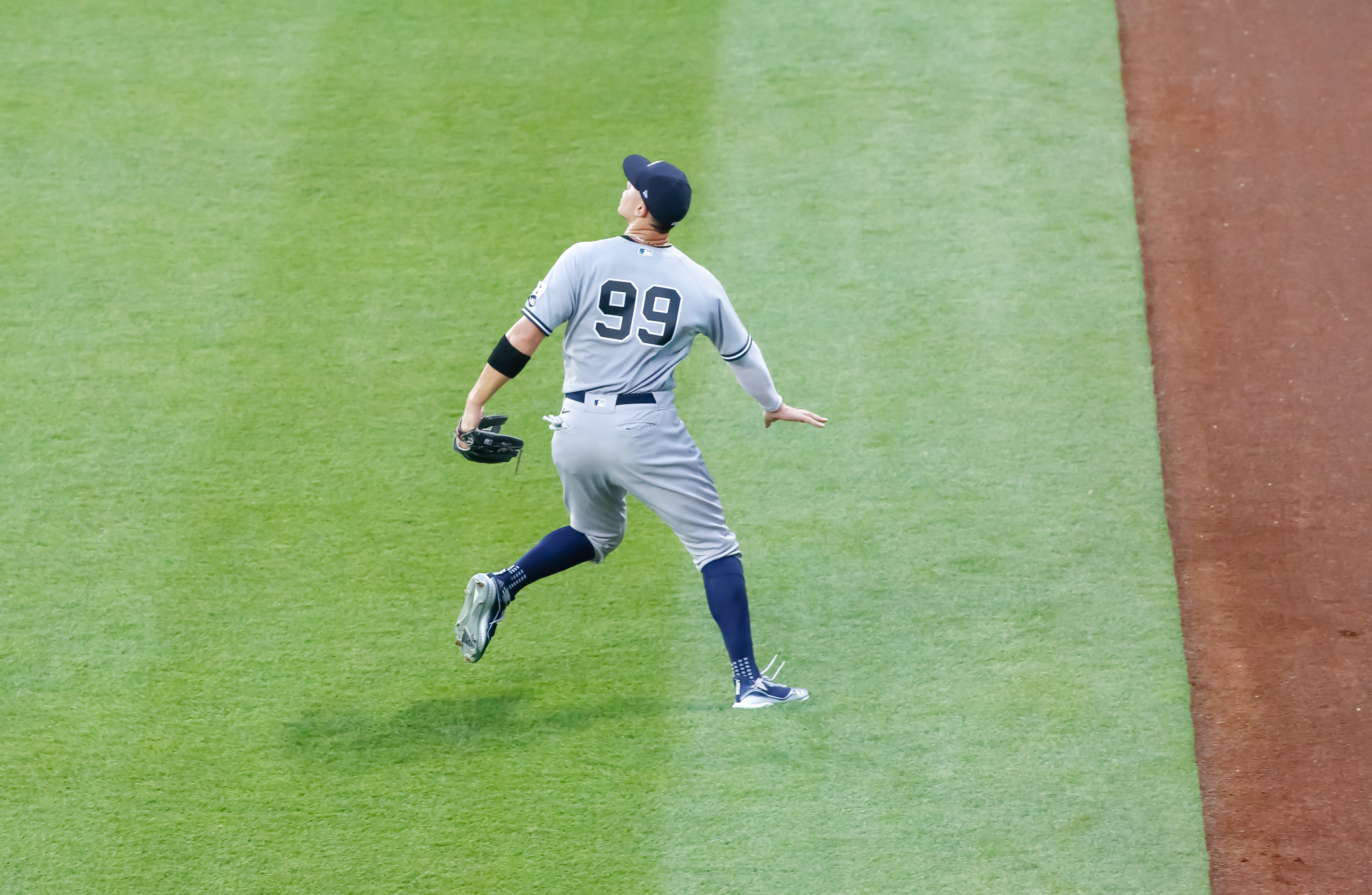
Judge chasing down a fly ball

Judge has worn the unusual uniform number of 99 since it was given to him during 2016 spring training (higher numbers are typically given to young players who are not expected to make the final regular-season roster). In 2016, Judge stated that he would have preferred either No. 44 (retired by the Yankees to honor Reggie Jackson) or No. 35 but was not sure whether he would switch if the latter two were to become available.

MLB along with the MLB Players Association, created Players Weekend to let players "express themselves while connecting with their past in youth baseball". From August 25–27, 2017, players wore alternate team jerseys inspired by youth league designs. They also had the option to replace their last names with their nicknames on their jersey nameplates, and the vast majority of players did so. Judge chose the nickname "All Rise" (given to him by former teammate Todd Frazier) to be worn on the back of his jersey nameplate. For the 2018 Players Weekend, Judge chose to just have his last name on the back of his jersey. During the 2019 event, Judge chose his own nickname, "BAJ", an abbreviation of "Big Aaron Judge".

== Personal life ==
Judge married his wife in December 2021 at a private ceremony in Maui. They met at Linden High School and both attended Fresno State University. Their first child was born in January 2025.

Judge has two pet dachshunds named Gus and Penny.

Judge is a Christian. He grew up going to a Methodist church and has posted about his faith on his social media accounts.

=== Philanthropy ===
Judge is the founder of the ALL RISE Foundation. Judge's mother, Patty, serves as its executive director and president. The foundation's mission statement is to "inspire children and youth to become responsible citizens and encourage them to reach unlimited possibilities." In January 2024, the foundation hosted an "All-Star Evening" gala on Wall Street, raising nearly $800,000 for various youth programs in New York City.

=== Endorsements ===
At the beginning of his career, Judge had contracts with Rawlings, Under Armour, and Fanatics. After his 2017 rookie season, Judge signed a multi-year endorsement deal with Pepsi. Judge endorsed Under Armour gear from 2014 until the 2018 season, when he signed an endorsement deal with Adidas. That deal expired in 2022. In August 2023, Judge signed a shoe deal with Nike-owned Jordan Brand, becoming the fifth active MLB player to do so. For the 2023 season, Legends Hospitality, the concessions company at Yankee Stadium, announced "The 99 Burger", a California-inspired food item named after Judge's uniform number. In March 2024, Judge was named the face of a new Ralph Lauren fragrance, "Polo Est. 67 Eau de Toilette" and its "Design Your Dreams" ad campaign. In April 2024, Judge agreed to endorse energy drink Prime. In 2025, Judge became the first active MLB player featured on a Big League Chew pouch when he appeared on the limited-edition "Grand Slam Grape" flavor.

=== Media appearances ===
Judge appeared on the cover of the May 15, 2017, edition of Sports Illustrated with the title "All Rise". That same day, Judge appeared on an episode of The Tonight Show Starring Jimmy Fallon where he posed undercover in Bryant Park to ask Yankee fans questions about himself.

On November 6, 2017, Judge was named the cover athlete for MLB The Show 18.

Judge appeared on a 23-second skit on rapper Logic's 2022 album Vinyl Days named after himself.

In 2024, Judge and his two pet dachshunds guest starred on an episode of Rubble & Crew, a Paw Patrol spin-off. His wife voiced their dog Penny.

Judge also participated in the 2026 FIFA World Cup draw on December 5, 2025.

On January 27, 2026, Judge was announced as the cover athlete for MLB The Show 26, becoming just the second player to appear on the game's cover twice.

== Career accomplishments ==
=== New York Yankees franchise records ===
- Most home runs in a season hit at home: 33 (Babe Ruth held the record with 32).
- Most home runs in a season by a rookie: 52 (Joe DiMaggio held the record with 29)
- Most home runs in a single season: 62 (Roger Maris held the record with 61)
- First right-handed hitter in Yankees history with at least 100 RBIs, 100 runs scored, and 100 walks in a single season
- Most home runs (4) in the first seven home playoff games, tying Reggie Jackson (1977–78).
- Most home runs by the All-Star break (34).
- Fastest to reach 60 home runs in a single season (147th team game).
- First to hit three home runs in a game twice in one season.
- Highest strikeout rate in the postseason (32.8%)
- Equal most home runs in first 1,000 games with the Yankees: 321 (tied with Babe Ruth)

=== AL records ===
- Home runs in a rookie season (52, 2017)
- Strikeouts in a single postseason (27, 2017)
- Strikeouts in a rookie season (208, 2017)
- Home runs in a single season (62, 2022)
- Most intentional walks in a season (36, 2025)

=== MLB records ===
- Striking out in 37 consecutive games. (2017)
- Most strikeouts by a rookie with 208.
- Most walks by a rookie with 127.
- First rookie in MLB history with at least 45 home runs, 100 RBIs, and 100 runs scored.
- Fastest to reach 60 career home runs. (197 games)
- Most strikeouts in a doubleheader with 8.
- Most single-season multi-home run games (11; tied with Hank Greenberg, Sammy Sosa, and Cal Raleigh)
- Most career home runs in postseason winner-takes-all games (4)
- Fastest to reach 250 career home runs. (810 games)
- Fastest to reach 300 career home runs. (955 games)
- Fastest to reach 350 career home runs. (1,088 games)
- Most single-season home runs by a player in the first inning (20, 2025)
- Most seasons with 50+ home runs: 4 (Tied with Babe Ruth, Mark McGwire, and Sammy Sosa)
- Most seasons with 50+ home runs and 10+ stolen bases: 3
- Most career home runs in postseason elimination games: 6 (Tied with David Ortiz)

=== Awards and honors ===
MLB

- 3× AL MVP (2022, 2024, 2025)
- 8× MLB All-Star (2017, 2018, 2021, 2022, 2023, 2024, 2025, 2026)
- 5× All-MLB Team selection:
  - 4× All-MLB First Team (2021, 2022, 2024, 2025)
  - All-MLB Second Team (2023)
- 3× AL Hank Aaron Award (2022, 2024, 2025)
- 5× Silver Slugger Award (2017, 2021, 2022, 2024, 2025)
- MLB batting champion (2025)
- 3× AL home run leader (2017, 2022, 2024)
- 2× AL RBI leader (2022, 2024)
- AL Rookie of the Year (2017)
- Roberto Clemente Award (2023)
- Home Run Derby champion (2017)
- Wilson Defensive Player of the Year Award (2019)
- Fielding Bible Award (2021)
- 60 Home Run Club (2022)
- 4× 50 Home Run Club (2017, 2022, 2024, 2025)
- 2× Players Choice Award for Player of the Year (2022, 2024)
- 2× Players Choice Award for AL Outstanding Player (2022, 2024)
- Players Choice Award for AL Outstanding Rookie (2017)
- Esurance MLB Award for Best Rookie (2017)
- 15× American League (AL) Player of the Week (June 5–11, 2017, September 18–24, 2017, July 27 – August 2, 2020, May 10–16, 2021, July 18–24, 2022, July 25–31, 2022, September 29 – October 5, 2022, May 15–21, 2023, September 18–24, 2023, May 13–19, 2024, June 3–9, 2024, August 19–25, 2024, March 27–31, 2025, September 8–14, 2025, September 22–28, 2025)
- 12× AL Player of the Month (June 2017, September 2017, May 2022, July 2022, September 2022, May 2023, May 2024, June 2024, August 2024, April 2025, May 2025, September 2025)

Media

- 3× Baseball America Major League Player of the Year (2022, 2024, 2025)
- 2× Baseball Digest Player of the Year (2022, 2024)
- The Associated Press (AP) Male Athlete of the Year (2022)
- TIME Athlete of the Year (2022)
- Hickok Belt (2022)
- Sports Illustrated Male Athlete of the Year (2022)
- Sports Illustrated MLB Player of the Year (2024)
- The Sporting News Player of the Year (2022)
- The Sporting News AL Rookie of the Year Award (2017)
- Baseball America Rookie of the Year Award (2017)
- The Daily News New York Sportsperson of the Year (2017)
- SNY "King of New York Sports" (2025)
- 5× Sid Mercer–Dick Young Player of the Year Award (2017, 2021, 2022, 2024, 2025)
- 2× Joe DiMaggio "Toast of the Town" Award (2017, 2022)
- Topps All-Star Rookie Team (2017)

State/Local

- Key to the City of New York (2023)

=== Statistical achievements ===
American League statistical leader
Category	Times	Seasons
Adjusted OPS+ leader	3	2022, 2024, 2025
Bases on balls leader	4	2017, 2022, 2024, 2025
Batting average leader	1	2025
Extra base hits leader	3	2022, 2024, 2025
Home runs leader	3	2017, 2022, 2024
On-base percentage leader	3	2022, 2024, 2025
On-base plus slugging leader	3	2022, 2024, 2025
Runs batted in leader	2	2022, 2024
Runs scored leader	3	2017, 2022, 2025
Slugging percentage leader	3	2022, 2024, 2025
Total bases leader	3	2022, 2024, 2025
Wins above replacement leader	3	2022, 2024, 2025
Wins above replacement @ position	3	2022, 2024, 2025

== See also ==
- List of California State University, Fresno people
- 50 home run club
- List of Major League Baseball career home run leaders
- List of Major League Baseball career strikeouts by batters leaders
- List of Major League Baseball annual home run leaders
- List of Major League Baseball annual runs batted in leaders
- List of Major League Baseball annual runs scored leaders
- List of Major League Baseball players with a home run in their first major league at bat
- List of New York Yankees team records
- New York Yankees award winners and league leaders

== Notes ==
Awards and achievements
Preceded by Carlos Correa; Manny Machado; José Ramírez; Yordan Alvarez; Alex Bregman; Matt Chapman; Gunnar Henderson; Himself; Bobby Witt Jr. Wyatt Langford; Himself; Shea Langeliers	American League Player of the Month; June 2017; September 2017; May 2022; July 2022; September 2022; May 2023; May 2024; June 2024; August 2024; April 2025; May 2025; September 2025	Succeeded by Jose Altuve; Didi Gregorius; Yordan Alvarez; Alex Bregman; Matt Chapman; Shohei Ohtani; Himself; Bobby Witt Jr. Himself; Cal Raleigh
