= Linden High School (California) =

Location
- 18527 E. Front Street; Linden, California 95236; United States; 38.0202°N 121.0897°W

Information
- Type: Public high school secondary school
- Established: 1921
- School district: Linden Unified School District
- Superintendent: Dan Moore
- Principal: Todd Dunaway
- Teaching staff: 38.06 (FTE)
- Grades: 9-12
- Gender: Co-educational
- Enrollment: 720 (2023-2024)
- Student to teacher ratio: 18.92
- Campus type: Rural
- Colors: Blue and gold
- Athletics conference: San Joaquin Athletic Association
- Mascot: Lion
- Team name: Lions
- Rival: Summerville Union High School
- Website: lhs.lindenusd.com

Linden High School is a four-year public high school in Linden, California, United States. It is a part of the Linden Unified School District.

== History ==
Linden High School began classes in 1921.

== Athletics ==
The following sports are offered at Linden:

- Baseball
- Basketball
- Football
- Golf
- Soccer
- Softball
- Tennis
- Volleyball
- Wrestling

== Notable alumni ==
- Aaron Judge (2010), MLB outfielder for the New York Yankees
- Brooke Bryant (2018), Ice hockey player for the PWHL Minnesota
