= Linden, California =

Linden
- Census-designated place
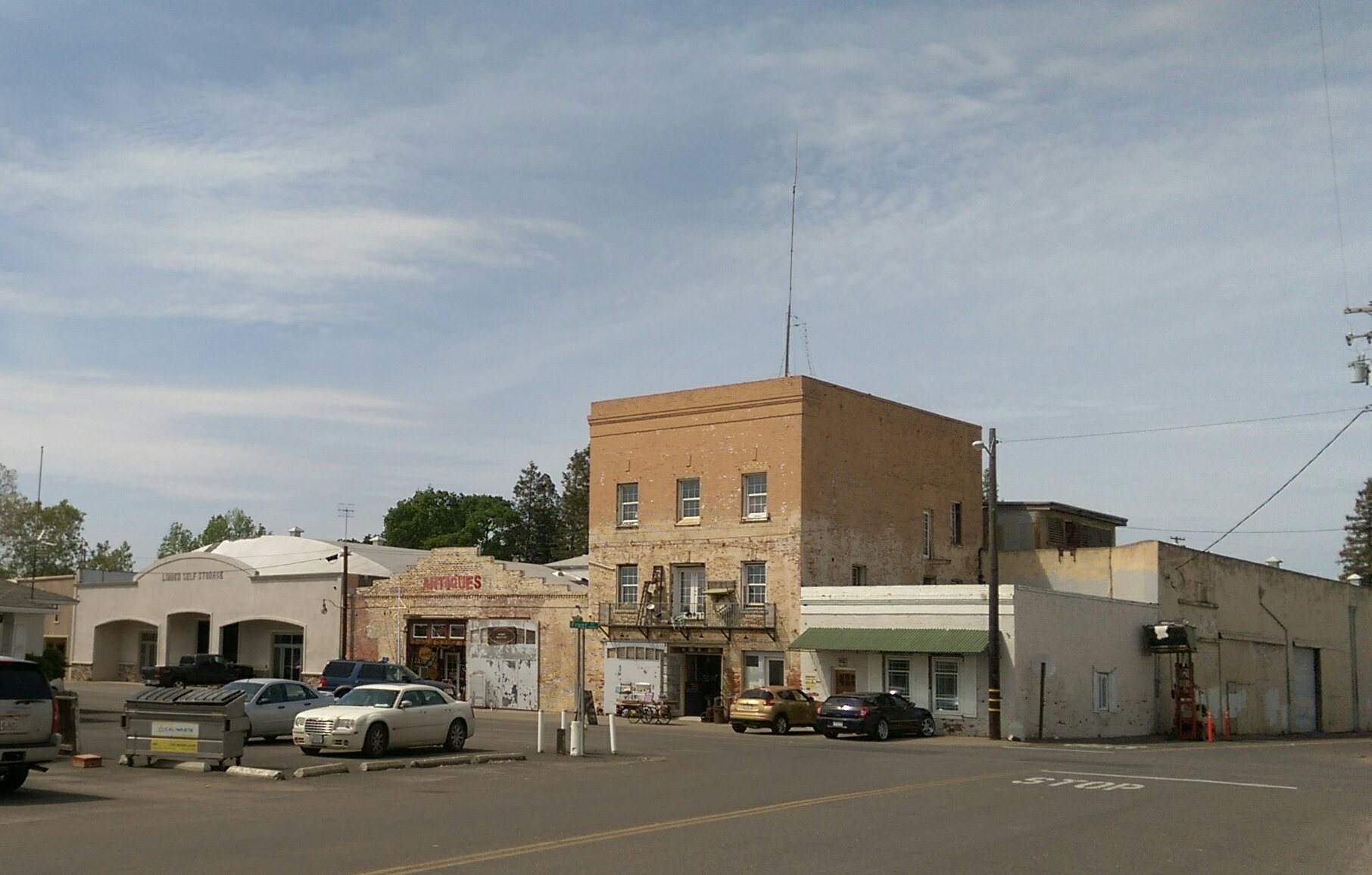

- Location in San Joaquin County and the state of California

- Location in the United States
- Coordinates: 38°1′12″N 121°5′29″W
- Country: United States
- State: California
- County: San Joaquin

Government
  - State senator: Jerry McNerney (D)
  - Assemblymember: Heath Flora (R)
  - U. S. rep.: Josh Harder (D)

Area
  - Total: 7.461 sq mi (19.324 km^{2})
  - Land: 7.409 sq mi (19.189 km^{2})
  - Water: 0.052 sq mi (0.135 km^{2}) 0.70%
- Elevation: 92 ft (28 m)

Population (2020)
  - Total: 1,863
  - Density: 251.5/sq mi (97.09/km^{2})
- Time zone: UTC-8 (Pacific Time Zone)
  - Summer (DST): UTC-7 (PDT)
- ZIP code: 95236
- Area code: 209
- FIPS code: 06-41670
- GNIS feature ID: 277540

Linden is a census-designated place (CDP) in San Joaquin County, California, United States. The population was 1,863 at the 2020 census, up from 1,784 at the 2010 census. The city is host of the Linden Cherry Festival each spring.

== Geography ==
Linden is located at 38°1′12″N 121°5′29″W (38.019989, -121.091450), along California Highway 26 and is approx 13 miles ENE of Stockton.

According to the United States Census Bureau, the CDP has a total area of 7.5 square miles (19 km^{2}), 99.30% of it land and 0.70% of it water.

== Demographics ==
Historical population
Census	Pop.	Note	%±
1990	1,339		—
2000	1,103		−17.6%
2010	1,784		61.7%
2020	1,863		4.4%
U.S. Decennial Census; 1860–1870 1880-1890; 1900 1910 1920; 1930 1940 1950; 1960 1970 1980; 1990 2000 2010

Linden first appeared as a census designated place in the 1990 U.S. census.

=== Racial and ethnic composition ===
Linden CDP, California – Racial and ethnic composition Note: the US Census treats Hispanic/Latino as an ethnic category. This table excludes Latinos from the racial categories and assigns them to a separate category. Hispanics/Latinos may be of any race.
Race / Ethnicity (NH = Non-Hispanic)	Pop 2000	Pop 2010	Pop 2020	% 2000	% 2010	% 2020
White alone (NH)	905	1,326	1,153	82.05%	74.33%	61.89%
Black or African American alone (NH)	3	4	10	0.27%	0.22%	0.54%
Native American or Alaska Native alone (NH)	12	7	4	1.09%	0.39%	0.21%
Asian alone (NH)	9	19	24	0.82%	1.07%	1.29%
Native Hawaiian or Pacific Islander alone (NH)	0	1	4	0.00%	0.06%	0.21%
Other race alone (NH)	0	1	8	0.00%	0.06%	0.43%
Mixed race or Multiracial (NH)	19	41	92	1.72%	2.30%	4.94%
Hispanic or Latino (any race)	155	385	568	14.05%	21.58%	30.49%
Total	1,103	1,784	1,863	100.00%	100.00%	100.00%

=== 2020 census ===
As of the 2020 census, Linden had a population of 1,863. The population density was 251.5 inhabitants per square mile (97.1/km^{2}). The median age was 40.0 years. The age distribution was 488 people (26.2%) under the age of 18, 161 people (8.6%) aged 18 to 24, 429 people (23.0%) aged 25 to 44, 472 people (25.3%) aged 45 to 64, and 313 people (16.8%) who were 65 years of age or older. For every 100 females, there were 100.3 males, and for every 100 females age 18 and over, there were 95.0 males age 18 and over.

0.0% of residents lived in urban areas, while 100.0% lived in rural areas.

The whole population lived in households. There were 656 households, out of which 225 (34.3%) had children under the age of 18 living in them, 411 (62.7%) were married-couple households, 34 (5.2%) were cohabiting couple households, 131 (20.0%) had a female householder with no partner present, and 80 (12.2%) had a male householder with no partner present. 124 households (18.9%) were one person, and 80 (12.2%) were one person aged 65 or older. The average household size was 2.84. There were 499 families (76.1% of all households).

There were 682 housing units at an average density of 92.1 units per square mile (35.6 units/km^{2}), of which 656 (96.2%) were occupied. Of these, 515 (78.5%) were owner-occupied, and 141 (21.5%) were occupied by renters. Of all housing units, 3.8% were vacant. The homeowner vacancy rate was 1.3%, and the rental vacancy rate was 8.4%.

Racial composition as of the 2020 census
Race	Number	Percent
White	1,268	68.1%
Black or African American	13	0.7%
American Indian and Alaska Native	21	1.1%
Asian	31	1.7%
Native Hawaiian and Other Pacific Islander	4	0.2%
Some other race	248	13.3%
Two or more races	278	14.9%

=== Income and poverty ===
In 2023, the US Census Bureau estimated that the median household income was $123,378, and the per capita income was $45,771. About 1.5% of families and 3.2% of the population were below the poverty line.

=== 2010 census ===
At the 2010 census Linden had a population of 1,784. The population density was 239.1 inhabitants per square mile (92.3/km^{2}). The racial makeup of Linden was 1,541 (86.4%) White, 6 (0.3%) African American, 10 (0.6%) Native American, 25 (1.4%) Asian, 1 (0.1%) Pacific Islander, 127 (7.1%) from other races, and 74 (4.1%) from two or more races. Hispanic or Latino of any race were 385 people (21.6%).

The census reported that 1,784 people (100% of the population) lived in households, no one lived in non-institutionalized group quarters and no one was institutionalized.

There were 631 households, 275 (43.6%) had children under the age of 18 living in them, 389 (61.6%) were opposite-sex married couples living together, 76 (12.0%) had a female householder with no husband present, 36 (5.7%) had a male householder with no wife present. There were 32 (5.1%) unmarried opposite-sex partnerships, and 4 (0.6%) same-sex married couples or partnerships. 106 households (16.8%) were one person and 41 (6.5%) had someone living alone who was 65 or older. The average household size was 2.83. There were 501 families (79.4% of households); the average family size was 3.18.

The age distribution was 516 people (28.9%) under the age of 18, 118 people (6.6%) aged 18 to 24, 468 people (26.2%) aged 25 to 44, 461 people (25.8%) aged 45 to 64, and 221 people (12.4%) who were 65 or older. The median age was 36.9 years. For every 100 females, there were 98.2 males. For every 100 women age 18 and over, there were 99.4 men.

There were 673 housing units at an average density of 90.2 per square mile, of the occupied units 490 (77.7%) were owner-occupied and 141 (22.3%) were rented. The homeowner vacancy rate was 2.0%; the rental vacancy rate was 6.0%. 1,339 people (75.1% of the population) lived in owner-occupied housing units and 445 people (24.9%) lived in rental housing units.

== Notable people and events ==
The 1974 film Dirty Mary, Crazy Larry was filmed in and around Linden.

Pavement, a band hailing from nearby Stockton, immortalizes the town in "Feed 'Em to the (Linden) Lions", song three on their 1992 EP, Watery, Domestic.

The Speed Freak Killers, a serial killer duo, are from Linden.

Ervin Zádor, gold medalist at 1956 Summer Olympics in water polo and famous for being brutally punched in the Blood in the Water match, spent the last years of his life in Linden.

Baseball superstar Aaron Judge, the 2017 AL Rookie of the Year, 2022, 2024, and 2025 AL Most Valuable Player, and all-time single-season American League home run king hails from Linden.

The city is host of the Linden Cherry Festival each spring.
