= List of Major League Baseball All-Star Game starting pitchers =

Below is a list of starting pitchers for the American League and National League in each Major League Baseball All-Star Game. Major League Baseball has held an All-Star Game nearly every year since 1933; no All-Star Game was held in 1945 or 2020, and two All-Star Games per year were held from 1959 to 1962. The pitching staffs for the two leagues are determined by a ballot of current players and the commissioner of baseball, and the starting pitcher is designated by each team's manager. Unlike regular season and postseason baseball games, starting pitchers generally only pitch one or two innings to allow the rest of the pitching staff opportunities to enter the game.

Lefty Gomez and Robin Roberts lead the American League and National League, respectively, having started the All-Star Game five times each. The New York Yankees have had the most starting pitchers of any team with 21, while the Los Angeles Dodgers lead the National League with 17.

== Game results ==
Key
†	Elected to the Baseball Hall of Fame
^{W}	Winning pitcher
^{L}	Losing pitcher

Date	Winning League (All-Time Record)	Score	Venue	AL Starting Pitcher	Team	NL Starting Pitcher	Team
July 6, 1933	American (1–0–0 AL)	4–2	Comiskey Park	Lefty Gomez^{W} (1)^{†}	New York Yankees (1)	Bill Hallahan^{L}	St. Louis Cardinals (1)
July 10, 1934	American (2–0–0 AL)	9–7	Polo Grounds	Lefty Gomez (2)^{†}	New York Yankees (2)	Carl Hubbell^{†}	New York Giants (1)
July 8, 1935	American (3–0–0 AL)	4–1	Cleveland Stadium	Lefty Gomez^{W} (3)^{†}	New York Yankees (3)	Bill Walker^{L}	St. Louis Cardinals (2)
July 7, 1936	National (3–1–0 AL)	4–3	National League Park	Lefty Grove^{L}^{†}	Boston Red Sox (1)	Dizzy Dean^{W} (1)^{†}	St. Louis Cardinals (3)
July 7, 1937	American (4–1–0 AL)	8–3	Griffith Stadium	Lefty Gomez^{W} (4)^{†}	New York Yankees (4)	Dizzy Dean^{L} (2)^{†}	St. Louis Cardinals (4)
July 6, 1938	National (4–2–0 AL)	4–1	Crosley Field	Lefty Gomez^{L} (5)^{†}	New York Yankees (5)	Johnny Vander Meer^{W}	Cincinnati Reds (1)
July 11, 1939	American (5–2–0 AL)	3–1	Yankee Stadium	Red Ruffing (1)^{†}	New York Yankees (6)	Paul Derringer (1)	Cincinnati Reds (2)
July 9, 1940	National (5–3–0 AL)	4–0	Sportsman's Park	Red Ruffing^{L} (2)^{†}	New York Yankees (7)	Paul Derringer^{W} (2)	Cincinnati Reds (3)
July 8, 1941	American (6–3–0 AL)	7–5	Briggs Stadium	Bob Feller (1)^{†}	Cleveland Indians (1)	Whit Wyatt	Brooklyn Dodgers (1)
July 6, 1942	American (7–3–0 AL)	3–1	Polo Grounds	Spud Chandler^{W}	New York Yankees (8)	Mort Cooper^{L} (1)	St. Louis Cardinals (5)
July 13, 1943	American (8–3–0 AL)	5–3	Shibe Park	Dutch Leonard^{W}	Washington Senators (1) (Note: First iteration of the Washington Nationals who relocated to Minneapolis as the Minnesota Twins in 1961.)	Mort Cooper^{L} (2)	St. Louis Cardinals (6)
July 11, 1944	National (8–4–0 AL)	7–1	Forbes Field	Hank Borowy	New York Yankees (9)	Bucky Walters	Cincinnati Reds (4)
July 10, 1945	Game canceled due to World War II-related travel restrictions. Game was originally scheduled to be held at Fenway Park in Boston, Massachusetts.						
July 9, 1946	American (9–4–0 AL)	12–0	Fenway Park	Bob Feller^{W} (2)^{†}	Cleveland Indians (2)	Claude Passeau^{L}	Chicago Cubs (1)
July 8, 1947	American (10–4–0 AL)	2–1	Wrigley Field	Hal Newhouser^{†}	Detroit Tigers (1)	Ewell Blackwell	Cincinnati Reds (5)
July 13, 1948	American (11–4–0 AL)	5–2	Sportsman's Park	Walt Masterson	Washington Senators (2)	Ralph Branca	Brooklyn Dodgers (2)
July 12, 1949	American (12–4–0 AL)	11–7	Ebbets Field	Mel Parnell	Boston Red Sox (2)	Warren Spahn (1)^{†}	Boston Braves (1)
July 11, 1950	National (12–5–0 AL)	4–3 (14)	Comiskey Park	Vic Raschi (1)	New York Yankees (10)	Robin Roberts (1)^{†}	Philadelphia Phillies (1)
July 10, 1951	National (12–6–0 AL)	8–3	Briggs Stadium	Ned Garver	St. Louis Browns (1) (Note: The St. Louis Browns relocated to Baltimore and became the Baltimore Orioles in 1953.)	Robin Roberts (2)^{†}	Philadelphia Phillies (2)
July 8, 1952	National (12–7–0 AL)	3–2 (5)	Shibe Park	Vic Raschi (2)	New York Yankees (11)	Curt Simmons (1)	Philadelphia Phillies (3)
July 14, 1953	National (12–8–0 AL)	5–1	Crosley Field	Billy Pierce (1)	Chicago White Sox (1)	Robin Roberts (3)^{†}	Philadelphia Phillies (4)
July 13, 1954	American (13–8–0 AL)	11–9	Cleveland Stadium	Whitey Ford (1)^{†}	New York Yankees (12)	Robin Roberts (4)^{†}	Philadelphia Phillies (5)
July 12, 1955	National (13–9–0 AL)	6–5 (12)	County Stadium	Billy Pierce (2)	Chicago White Sox (2)	Robin Roberts (5)^{†}	Philadelphia Phillies (6)
July 10, 1956	National (13–10–0 AL)	7–3	Griffith Stadium	Billy Pierce^{L} (3)	Chicago White Sox (3)	Bob Friend^{W} (1)	Pittsburgh Pirates (1)
July 9, 1957	American (14–10–0 AL)	6–5	Busch Stadium	Jim Bunning^{W} (1)^{†}	Detroit Tigers (2)	Curt Simmons^{L} (2)	Philadelphia Phillies (7)
July 8, 1958	American (15–10–0 AL)	4–3	Memorial Stadium	Bob Turley	New York Yankees (13)	Warren Spahn (2)^{†}	Milwaukee Braves (2)
July 7, 1959	National (15–11–0 AL)	5–4	Forbes Field	Early Wynn^{†}	Chicago White Sox (4)	Don Drysdale (1)^{†}	Los Angeles Dodgers (3)
August 3, 1959	American (16–11–0 AL)	5–3	Memorial Coliseum	Jerry Walker^{W}	Baltimore Orioles (2)	Don Drysdale^{L} (2)^{†}	Los Angeles Dodgers (4)
July 11, 1960	National (16–12–0 AL)	5–3	Municipal Stadium	Bill Monbouquette^{L}	Boston Red Sox (3)	Bob Friend^{W} (2)	Pittsburgh Pirates (2)
July 13, 1960	National (16–13–0 AL)	6–0	Yankee Stadium	Whitey Ford^{L} (2)^{†}	New York Yankees (14)	Vern Law^{W}	Pittsburgh Pirates (3)
July 11, 1961	National (16–14–0 AL)	5–4 (10)	Candlestick Park	Whitey Ford (3)^{†}	New York Yankees (15)	Warren Spahn (3)^{†}	Milwaukee Braves (3)
July 31, 1961	TIE (16–14–1 AL)	1–1	Fenway Park	Jim Bunning (2)^{†}	Detroit Tigers (3)	Bob Purkey	Cincinnati Reds (6)
July 10, 1962	National (16–15–1 AL)	3–1	D.C. Stadium	Jim Bunning (3)^{†}	Detroit Tigers (4)	Don Drysdale (3)^{†}	Los Angeles Dodgers (5)
July 30, 1962	American (17–15–1 AL)	9–4	Wrigley Field	Dave Stenhouse	Washington Senators (1) (Note: Second iteration of the Washington Senators who relocated to Dallas-Fort Worth as the Texas Rangers in 1972.)	Johnny Podres	Los Angeles Dodgers (6)
July 9, 1963	National (17–16–1 AL)	5–3	Cleveland Stadium	Ken McBride	Los Angeles Angels (1)	Jim O'Toole	Cincinnati Reds (7)
July 7, 1964	National (17–17–1)	7–4	Shea Stadium	Dean Chance (1)	Los Angeles Angels (2)	Don Drysdale (4)^{†}	Los Angeles Dodgers (7)
July 13, 1965	National (18–17–1 NL)	6–5	Metropolitan Stadium	Milt Pappas	Baltimore Orioles (3)	Juan Marichal (1)^{†}	San Francisco Giants (2)
July 12, 1966	National (19–17–1 NL)	2–1 (10)	Busch Memorial Stadium	Denny McLain	Detroit Tigers (5)	Sandy Koufax^{†}	Los Angeles Dodgers (8)
July 11, 1967	National (20–17–1 NL)	2–1 (15)	Anaheim Stadium	Dean Chance (2)	Los Angeles Angels (3)	Juan Marichal (2)^{†}	San Francisco Giants (3)
July 9, 1968	National (21–17–1 NL)	1–0	Astrodome	Luis Tiant^{L}	Cleveland Indians (3)	Don Drysdale^{W} (5)^{†}	Los Angeles Dodgers (9)
July 23, 1969	National (22–17–1 NL)	9–3	RFK Stadium	Mel Stottlemyre^{L}	New York Yankees (16)	Steve Carlton^{W} (1)^{†}	St. Louis Cardinals (8)
July 14, 1970	National (23–17–1 NL)	5–4 (12)	Riverfront Stadium	Jim Palmer (1)^{†}	Baltimore Orioles (4)	Tom Seaver^{†}	New York Mets (1)
July 13, 1971	American (23–18–1 NL)	6–4	Tiger Stadium	Vida Blue^{W} (1)	Oakland Athletics (1)	Dock Ellis^{L}	Pittsburgh Pirates (4)
July 25, 1972	National (24–18–1 NL)	4–3 (10)	Atlanta Stadium	Jim Palmer (2)^{†}	Baltimore Orioles (5)	Bob Gibson^{†}	St. Louis Cardinals (7)
July 24, 1973	National (25–18–1 NL)	7–1	Royals Stadium	Catfish Hunter^{†}	Oakland Athletics (2)	Rick Wise^{W}	St. Louis Cardinals (8)
July 23, 1974	National (26–18–1 NL)	7–2	Three Rivers Stadium	Gaylord Perry^{†}	Cleveland Indians (4)	Andy Messersmith	Los Angeles Dodgers (10)
July 15, 1975	National (27–18–1 NL)	6–3	County Stadium	Vida Blue (2)	Oakland Athletics (3)	Jerry Reuss	Pittsburgh Pirates (5)
July 13, 1976	National (28–18–1 NL)	7–1	Veterans Stadium	Mark Fidrych^{L}	Detroit Tigers (6)	Randy Jones^{W}	San Diego Padres (1)
July 19, 1977	National (29–18–1 NL)	7–5	Yankee Stadium	Jim Palmer^{L} (3)^{†}	Baltimore Orioles (6)	Don Sutton^{W}^{†}	Los Angeles Dodgers (11)
July 11, 1978	National (30–18–1 NL)	7–3	San Diego Stadium	Jim Palmer (4)^{†}	Baltimore Orioles (7)	Vida Blue (1)	San Francisco Giants (4)
July 17, 1979	National (31–18–1 NL)	7–6	Kingdome	Nolan Ryan^{†}	California Angels (4)	Steve Carlton (2)^{†}	Philadelphia Phillies (9)
July 8, 1980	National (32–18–1 NL)	4–2	Dodger Stadium	Steve Stone	Baltimore Orioles (8)	J. R. Richard	Houston Astros (1)
August 9, 1981	National (33–18–1 NL)	5–4	Cleveland Stadium	Jack Morris (1)^{†}	Detroit Tigers (7)	Fernando Valenzuela	Los Angeles Dodgers (12)
July 13, 1982	National (34–18–1 NL)	4–1	Olympic Stadium	Dennis Eckersley^{L}^{†}	Boston Red Sox (4)	Steve Rogers^{W}	Montreal Expos (1)
July 6, 1983	American (34–19–1 NL)	13–3	Comiskey Park	Dave Stieb^{W} (1)	Toronto Blue Jays (1)	Mario Soto^{L}	Cincinnati Reds (8)
July 10, 1984	National (35–19–1 NL)	3–1	Candlestick Park	Dave Stieb^{L} (2)	Toronto Blue Jays (2)	Charlie Lea^{W}	Montreal Expos (2)
July 16, 1985	National (36–19–1 NL)	6–1	Hubert H. Humphrey Metrodome	Jack Morris^{L} (2)^{†}	Detroit Tigers (8)	LaMarr Hoyt^{W}	San Diego Padres (2)
July 15, 1986	American (36–20–1 NL)	3–2	Astrodome	Roger Clemens^{W} (1)	Boston Red Sox (5)	Dwight Gooden (1)	New York Mets (2)
July 14, 1987	National (37–20–1 NL)	2–0 (13)	Oakland–Alameda County Coliseum	Bret Saberhagen	Kansas City Royals (1)	Mike Scott	Houston Astros (2)
July 12, 1988	American (37–21–1 NL)	2–1	Riverfront Stadium	Frank Viola^{W}	Minnesota Twins (3)	Dwight Gooden (2)	New York Mets (3)
July 11, 1989	American (37–22–1 NL)	5–3	Anaheim Stadium	Dave Stewart	Oakland Athletics (4)	Rick Reuschel	San Francisco Giants (5)
July 10, 1990	American (37–23–1 NL)	2–0	Wrigley Field	Bob Welch	Oakland Athletics (5)	Jack Armstrong	Cincinnati Reds (9)
July 9, 1991	American (37–24–1 NL)	4–2	SkyDome	Jack Morris (3)^{†}	Minnesota Twins (4)	Tom Glavine (1)^{†}	Atlanta Braves (4)
July 14, 1992	American (37–25–1 NL)	13–6	Jack Murphy Stadium	Kevin Brown^{W}	Texas Rangers (2)	Tom Glavine^{L} (2)^{†}	Atlanta Braves (5)
July 13, 1993	American (37–26–1 NL)	9–3	Oriole Park at Camden Yards	Mark Langston	California Angels (5)	Terry Mulholland	Philadelphia Phillies (10)
July 12, 1994	National (38–26–1 NL)	8–7 (10)	Three Rivers Stadium	Jimmy Key	New York Yankees (17)	Greg Maddux (1)^{†}	Atlanta Braves (6)
July 11, 1995	National (39–26–1 NL)	3–2	The Ballpark in Arlington	Randy Johnson (1)^{†}	Seattle Mariners (1)	Hideo Nomo	Los Angeles Dodgers (13)
July 9, 1996	National (40–26–1 NL)	6–0	Veterans Stadium	Charles Nagy^{L}	Cleveland Indians (5)	John Smoltz^{W}^{†}	Atlanta Braves (7)
July 8, 1997	American (40–27–1 NL)	3–1	Jacobs Field	Randy Johnson (2)^{†}	Seattle Mariners (2)	Greg Maddux (2)^{†}	Atlanta Braves (8)
July 7, 1998	American (40–28–1 NL)	13–8	Coors Field	David Wells (1)	New York Yankees (18)	Greg Maddux (3)^{†}	Atlanta Braves (9)
July 13, 1999	American (40–29–1 NL)	4–1	Fenway Park	Pedro Martinez^{†}	Boston Red Sox (6)	Curt Schilling^{L} (1)	Philadelphia Phillies (11)
July 11, 2000	American (40–30–1 NL)	6–3	Turner Field	David Wells (2)	Toronto Blue Jays (3)	Randy Johnson (1)^{†}	Arizona Diamondbacks (1)
July 10, 2001	American (40–31–1 NL)	4–1	Safeco Field	Roger Clemens (2)	New York Yankees (20)	Randy Johnson (2)^{†}	Arizona Diamondbacks (2)
July 9, 2002	TIE (40–31–2 NL)	7–7 (11)	Miller Park	Derek Lowe	Boston Red Sox (7)	Curt Schilling (2)	Arizona Diamondbacks (3)
July 15, 2003	American (40–32–2 NL)	7–6	U.S. Cellular Field	Esteban Loaiza	Chicago White Sox (5)	Jason Schmidt	San Francisco Giants (6)
July 13, 2004	American (40–33–2 NL)	9–4	Minute Maid Park	Mark Mulder^{W}	Oakland Athletics (6)	Roger Clemens^{L} (1)	Houston Astros (3)
July 12, 2005	American (40–34–2 NL)	7–5	Comerica Park	Mark Buehrle^{W}	Chicago White Sox (6)	Chris Carpenter	St. Louis Cardinals (9)
July 11, 2006	American (40–35–2 NL)	3–2	PNC Park	Kenny Rogers	Detroit Tigers (9)	Brad Penny	Los Angeles Dodgers (14)
July 10, 2007	American (40–36–2 NL)	5–4	AT&T Park	Dan Haren	Oakland Athletics (7)	Jake Peavy	San Diego Padres (3)
July 15, 2008	American (40–37–2 NL)	4–3 (15)	Yankee Stadium	Cliff Lee	Cleveland Indians (6)	Ben Sheets	Milwaukee Brewers (1)
July 14, 2009	American (40–38–2 NL)	4–3	Busch Stadium	Roy Halladay (1)^{†}	Toronto Blue Jays (4)	Tim Lincecum	San Francisco Giants (7)
July 13, 2010	National (41–38–2 NL)	3–1	Angel Stadium of Anaheim	David Price	Tampa Bay Rays (1)	Ubaldo Jimenez	Colorado Rockies (1)
July 12, 2011	National (42–38–2 NL)	5–1	Chase Field	Jered Weaver	Los Angeles Angels of Anaheim (6)	Roy Halladay (1)^{†}	Philadelphia Phillies (12)
July 10, 2012	National (43–38–2 NL)	8–0	Kauffman Stadium	Justin Verlander^{L} (1)	Detroit Tigers (10)	Matt Cain^{W}	San Francisco Giants (8)
July 16, 2013	American (43–39–2 NL)	3–0	Citi Field	Max Scherzer (1)	Detroit Tigers (11)	Matt Harvey	New York Mets (4)
July 15, 2014	American (43–40–2 NL)	5–3	Target Field	Felix Hernandez	Seattle Mariners (3)	Adam Wainwright	St. Louis Cardinals (10)
July 14, 2015	American (43–41–2 NL)	6–3	Great American Ball Park	Dallas Keuchel	Houston Astros (4)	Zack Greinke	Los Angeles Dodgers (15)
July 12, 2016	American (43–42–2 NL)	4–2	Petco Park	Chris Sale (1)	Chicago White Sox (7)	Johnny Cueto^{L}	San Francisco Giants (9)
July 11, 2017	American (43–43–2)	2–1 (10)	Marlins Park	Chris Sale (2)	Boston Red Sox (8)	Max Scherzer (1)	Washington Nationals (3)
July 17, 2018	American (44–43–2 AL)	8–6 (10)	Nationals Park	Chris Sale (3)	Boston Red Sox (9)	Max Scherzer (2)	Washington Nationals (4)
July 9, 2019	American (45–43–2 AL)	4–3	Progressive Field	Justin Verlander (2)	Houston Astros (5)	Hyun-jin Ryu	Los Angeles Dodgers (16)
July 14, 2020	Game canceled due to a delay in the start of the 2020 season as a result of the COVID-19 pandemic. Game was originally scheduled to be held at Dodger Stadium in Los Angeles, California.						
July 13, 2021	American (46–43–2 AL)	5–2	Coors Field	Shohei Ohtani^{W}	Los Angeles Angels (7)	Max Scherzer (3)	Washington Nationals (5)
July 19, 2022	American (47–43–2 AL)	3–2	Dodger Stadium	Shane McClanahan	Tampa Bay Rays (2)	Clayton Kershaw	Los Angeles Dodgers (17)
July 11, 2023	National (47–44–2 AL)	3–2	T-Mobile Park	Gerrit Cole	New York Yankees (21)	Zac Gallen	Arizona Diamondbacks (4)
July 16, 2024	American (48–44–2 AL)	5–3	Globe Life Field	Corbin Burnes	Baltimore Orioles (9)	Paul Skenes (1)	Pittsburgh Pirates (6)
July 15, 2025	National (48–45–2 AL)	7–6 (Note: The National League defeated the American League 4–3 in a swing-off tiebreaker.)	Truist Park	Tarik Skubal	Detroit Tigers (12)	Paul Skenes (2)	Pittsburgh Pirates (7)
July 14, 2026	American (49–45–2 AL)	4–0	Citizens Bank Park	Dylan Cease^{W}	Toronto Blue Jays (5)	Cristopher Sánchez^{L}	Philadelphia Phillies (13)
