= List of Major League Baseball All-Star Game broadcasters =

The following is a list of the American radio and television networks and announcers that have broadcast the Major League Baseball All-Star Game over the years.

== Television ==
=== 2020s ===
Year	Venue/Host team	Network	Play-by-play	Color commentator(s)	Field reporters	Pregame host	Pregame analysts
2026	Citizens Bank Park, Philadelphia Phillies	Fox	Joe Davis	John Smoltz	Ken Rosenthal and Tom Verducci	Kevin Burkhardt	Alex Rodriguez, David Ortiz, and Derek Jeter
2025	Truist Park, Atlanta Braves	Fox	Joe Davis	John Smoltz	Ken Rosenthal and Tom Verducci	Kevin Burkhardt	Alex Rodriguez, David Ortiz, and Derek Jeter
2024	Globe Life Field, Texas Rangers	Fox	Joe Davis	John Smoltz	Ken Rosenthal and Tom Verducci	Kevin Burkhardt	Alex Rodriguez, David Ortiz, and Derek Jeter
2023	T-Mobile Park, Seattle Mariners	Fox	Joe Davis	John Smoltz	Ken Rosenthal and Tom Verducci	Kevin Burkhardt	Alex Rodriguez, David Ortiz, and Derek Jeter
2022	Dodger Stadium, Los Angeles Dodgers	Fox	Joe Davis	John Smoltz	Ken Rosenthal and Tom Verducci	Kevin Burkhardt	Alex Rodriguez, David Ortiz, and Frank Thomas
2021	Coors Field, Colorado Rockies	Fox	Joe Buck	John Smoltz	Ken Rosenthal and Tom Verducci	Kevin Burkhardt	Alex Rodriguez, David Ortiz, and Frank Thomas
2020	Not held because of the coronavirus pandemic						

==== Notes ====
- On July 3, 2020, it was announced that the 2020 Major League Baseball All-Star Game scheduled to be held in Los Angeles would not be played due to the coronavirus pandemic. They will instead host in 2022.
- The 2021 game was originally scheduled to be played at Truist Park in Atlanta, GA, home of the Atlanta Braves. However, because of a new voter suppression bill being passed in Atlanta, Major League Baseball relocated the game, the 2021 Home Run Derby, and the 2021 MLB draft (a new addition to the All-Star festivities) to Denver.

=== 2010s ===
Year	Venue/Host team	Network	Play-by-play	Color commentator(s)	Field reporters	Pregame host	Pregame analyst(s)
2019	Progressive Field, Cleveland Indians	Fox	Joe Buck	John Smoltz	Ken Rosenthal and Tom Verducci	Kevin Burkhardt	Alex Rodriguez and Frank Thomas
2018	Nationals Park, Washington Nationals	Fox	Joe Buck	John Smoltz	Ken Rosenthal and Tom Verducci	Kevin Burkhardt	Alex Rodriguez, David Ortiz, and Frank Thomas
2017	Marlins Park, Miami Marlins	Fox	Joe Buck	John Smoltz	Ken Rosenthal and Tom Verducci	Kevin Burkhardt	Alex Rodriguez, David Ortiz, and Frank Thomas
2016	Petco Park, San Diego Padres	Fox	Joe Buck	John Smoltz	Ken Rosenthal and Tom Verducci	Chris Myers	Tom Verducci, Pete Rose, and Frank Thomas
2015	Great American Ball Park, Cincinnati Reds	Fox	Joe Buck	Harold Reynolds and Tom Verducci	Ken Rosenthal and Erin Andrews	Kevin Burkhardt	Pete Rose and Frank Thomas
2014	Target Field, Minnesota Twins	Fox	Joe Buck	Harold Reynolds and Tom Verducci	Ken Rosenthal and Erin Andrews	Kevin Burkhardt	Gabe Kapler and Frank Thomas
2013	Citi Field, New York Mets	Fox	Joe Buck	Tim McCarver	Ken Rosenthal and Erin Andrews	Joe Buck	
2012	Kauffman Stadium, Kansas City Royals	Fox	Joe Buck	Tim McCarver	Ken Rosenthal and Erin Andrews	Matt Vasgersian	Harold Reynolds and Eric Karros
2011	Chase Field, Arizona Diamondbacks	Fox	Joe Buck	Tim McCarver	Ken Rosenthal, Eric Karros, and Mark Grace	Chris Rose	Eric Karros
2010	Angel Stadium of Anaheim, Los Angeles Angels of Anaheim	Fox	Joe Buck	Tim McCarver	Ken Rosenthal, Chris Rose, and Eric Karros	Chris Rose	

==== Notes ====
- The 2010 All-Star Game marked the first time the annual game would be shown in 3D. Kenny Albert and Mark Grace were the announcers for the 3D broadcast.

=== 2000s ===
Year	Venue/Host team	Network	Play-by-play	Color commentator(s)	Field reporter(s)	Pregame host(s)	Pregame analyst(s)
2009	Busch Stadium, St. Louis Cardinals	Fox	Joe Buck	Tim McCarver	Ken Rosenthal, Chris Rose, and Eric Karros	Chris Rose	
2008	Yankee Stadium, New York Yankees	Fox	Joe Buck	Tim McCarver	Ken Rosenthal, Kevin Kennedy, and Eric Karros	Jeanne Zelasko and Chris Rose	Kevin Kennedy and Eric Karros
2007	AT&T Park, San Francisco Giants	Fox	Joe Buck	Tim McCarver	Ken Rosenthal, José Mota, and Eric Byrnes	Jeanne Zelasko	Kevin Kennedy and Eric Karros
2006	PNC Park, Pittsburgh Pirates	Fox	Joe Buck	Tim McCarver	Ken Rosenthal, José Mota, and Eric Byrnes	Jeanne Zelasko	Kevin Kennedy
2005	Comerica Park, Detroit Tigers	Fox	Joe Buck	Tim McCarver	—N/a	Jeanne Zelasko	Kevin Kennedy
2004	Minute Maid Park, Houston Astros	Fox	Joe Buck	Tim McCarver	—N/a	Jeanne Zelasko	Kevin Kennedy
2003	U.S. Cellular Field, Chicago White Sox	Fox	Joe Buck	Tim McCarver	—N/a	Jeanne Zelasko	Kevin Kennedy
2002	Miller Park, Milwaukee Brewers	Fox	Joe Buck	Tim McCarver	—N/a	Jeanne Zelasko	Kevin Kennedy
2001	Safeco Field, Seattle Mariners	Fox	Joe Buck	Tim McCarver and Steve Lyons	Steve Lyons	Jeanne Zelasko	Kevin Kennedy
2000	Turner Field, Atlanta Braves	NBC	Bob Costas	Joe Morgan	Jim Gray and Jimmy Roberts	Hannah Storm	

==== Notes ====
- In 2008, Fox went on the air at 7 p.m. Eastern Time with a special, one-hour "red carpet parade" show hosted by Jeanne Zelasko and Chris Rose. Also contributing to the program were reporters Mark Grace, Laura Okmin, and Charissa Thompson. This was followed by play-by-play man Joe Buck presiding over the pregame festivities (e.g. player introductions and the singing of "The Star-Spangled Banner") via the public address system.
  - The British rights-holder for this game, five (now known as Channel 5) ended its coverage at 6 a.m. BST with the game still in the 12th inning. The network explained that it had a commitment to carry the children's show The Wiggles that it could not break. The situation is similar to the infamous "Heidi Game" on the U.S. network NBC in 1968.

=== 1990s ===
Year	Venue/Host team	Network	Play-by-play	Color commentator(s)	Field reporter(s)	Pregame host(s)	Pregame analyst
1999	Fenway Park, Boston Red Sox	Fox	Joe Buck	Tim McCarver and Bob Brenly	Thom Brennaman	Keith Olbermann	Steve Lyons
1998	Coors Field, Colorado Rockies	NBC	Bob Costas	Joe Morgan	Jim Gray and Keith Olbermann	Hannah Storm and Keith Olbermann	
1997	Jacobs Field, Cleveland Indians	Fox	Joe Buck	Tim McCarver and Bob Brenly	—N/a	Chip Caray	Steve Lyons
1996	Veterans Stadium, Philadelphia Phillies	NBC	Bob Costas	Joe Morgan and Bob Uecker	Jim Gray	Hannah Storm	
1995	The Ballpark in Arlington, Texas Rangers	ABC	Al Michaels	Jim Palmer and Tim McCarver	Lesley Visser and Rick Dempsey	John Saunders	
1994	Three Rivers Stadium, Pittsburgh Pirates	NBC	Bob Costas	Joe Morgan and Bob Uecker	Hannah Storm and Johnny Bench	Greg Gumbel	
1993	Oriole Park at Camden Yards, Baltimore Orioles	CBS	Sean McDonough	Tim McCarver	Jim Kaat	Pat O'Brien and Andrea Joyce	
1992	Jack Murphy Stadium, San Diego Padres	CBS	Sean McDonough	Tim McCarver	Jim Kaat and Lesley Visser	Pat O'Brien	
1991	SkyDome, Toronto Blue Jays	CBS	Jack Buck	Tim McCarver	Jim Kaat and Lesley Visser	Pat O'Brien	
1990	Wrigley Field, Chicago Cubs	CBS	Jack Buck	Tim McCarver	Jim Kaat, Lesley Visser, and Pat O'Brien	Greg Gumbel	

==== Notes ====
- The 1990 All-Star Game from Chicago's Wrigley Field was marred by an approximately 68-minute rain delay during the top of the 7th inning. In the meantime, CBS aired Rescue 911.
- For CBS' coverage of the 1992 All-Star Game, they introduced Basecam, a lipstick-size camera, inside first base.
  - The 1992 All-Star Game on CBS was interrupted with coverage of the Democratic National Convention.
- In June 1993, CBS Sports' Lesley Visser suffered a jogging accident in New York's Central Park in which she broke her hip and skidded face-first across the pavement. She required reconstructive plastic surgery on her face and in 2006, she required an artificial hip replacement. She missed the 1993 Major League Baseball All-Star Game due to the accident. In Visser's place in the meantime, came Jim Kaat.
- The 1994 All-Star Game marked NBC's first broadcast of a Major League Baseball game since Game 5 of the 1989 National League Championship Series on October 9. It also marked the inaugural broadcast of "The Baseball Network", which was a short-lived (lasting through the conclusion of the 1995 World Series), revenue-sharing joint venture between NBC, ABC, and Major League Baseball. The '94 All-Star game also was broadcast in Spanish on NBC's Secondary Audio Program. Boston Red Sox announcer Héctor Martínez and seven time All-Star Tony Pérez were the announcers for the occasion.
- The 1998 MLB All Star Game did not feature Bob Uecker, who was originally supposed to call the game with Bob Costas and Joe Morgan, but he left NBC Sports due to back problems.

=== 1980s ===
Year	Venue/Host team	Network	Play-by-play	Color commentator(s)	Field reporter(s)	Pregame host(s)	Pregame analysts
1989	Anaheim Stadium, California Angels	NBC	Vin Scully	Tom Seaver and Ronald Reagan (1st inning only)	Bob Costas and Marv Albert		
1988	Riverfront Stadium, Cincinnati Reds	ABC	Al Michaels	Jim Palmer and Tim McCarver	Gary Bender and Joe Morgan	Al Michaels	Jim Palmer and Tim McCarver
1987	Oakland–Alameda County Coliseum, Oakland Athletics	NBC	Vin Scully	Joe Garagiola	Bob Costas and Marv Albert		
1986	Astrodome, Houston Astros	ABC	Al Michaels	Jim Palmer and Tim McCarver	Don Drysdale	Al Michaels	Jim Palmer and Tim McCarver
1985	Hubert H. Humphrey Metrodome, Minnesota Twins	NBC	Vin Scully	Joe Garagiola	Bob Costas		
1984	Candlestick Park, San Francisco Giants	ABC	Al Michaels	Howard Cosell and Earl Weaver	Don Drysdale and Jim Palmer	Howard Cosell	Don Drysdale and Jim Palmer
1983	Comiskey Park, Chicago White Sox	NBC	Vin Scully	Joe Garagiola	Don Sutton	Bob Costas	
1982	Olympic Stadium, Montreal Expos	ABC	Al Michaels (first half); Keith Jackson (second half)	Don Drysdale and Howard Cosell	Bob Uecker	Al Michaels and Keith Jackson	Don Drysdale and Howard Cosell
1981	Cleveland Stadium, Cleveland Indians	NBC	Joe Garagiola	Tony Kubek	—N/a	Bryant Gumbel	
1980	Dodger Stadium, Los Angeles Dodgers	ABC	Keith Jackson (first half); Al Michaels (second half)	Don Drysdale and Howard Cosell	Bob Uecker	Keith Jackson and Al Michaels	Don Drysdale and Howard Cosell

==== Notes ====
- The 1981 All-Star Game is to date, the only one to be played on a weekend (Sunday night). The game was originally to be played on July 14, but it was cancelled due to the players' strike lasting from June 12 to July 31. It was then brought back as a prelude to the second half of the season, which began the following day.
- For NBC's 1983 All-Star Game coverage, Don Sutton was in New York City, periodically tracking pitches with the aid of NBC's "Inside Pitch" technology.
- In 1984, Jim Palmer only served as a between innings analyst for ABC's coverage.
- In 1985, NBC's telecast of the All-Star Game out of the Metrodome in Minnesota was the first program to be broadcast in stereo by a TV network.
- Former President of the United States, Ronald Reagan (who had just left office) served as the color commentator instead of Tom Seaver (Vin Scully's normal NBC broadcasting partner at the time) for the first inning of the 1989 game.

=== 1970s ===
Year	Venue/Host team	Network	Play-by-play	Color commentator(s)	Field reporter	Pregame host	Pregame analysts
1979	Kingdome, Seattle Mariners	NBC	Joe Garagiola	Tony Kubek and Tom Seaver	—N/a	Bryant Gumbel	
1978	San Diego Stadium, San Diego Padres	ABC	Keith Jackson	Don Drysdale and Howard Cosell	Bob Uecker	Keith Jackson	Don Drysdale and Howard Cosell
1977	Yankee Stadium, New York Yankees	NBC	Joe Garagiola	Tony Kubek	Curt Gowdy	Bryant Gumbel	
1976	Veterans Stadium, Philadelphia Phillies	ABC	Bob Prince	Warner Wolf and Bob Uecker			
1975	County Stadium, Milwaukee Brewers	NBC	Curt Gowdy	Joe Garagiola and Tony Kubek	—N/a	Joe Garagiola	
1974	Three Rivers Stadium, Pittsburgh Pirates	NBC	Curt Gowdy	Joe Garagiola and Tony Kubek	—N/a	Joe Garagiola	
1973	Royals Stadium, Kansas City Royals	NBC	Curt Gowdy	Tony Kubek			
1972	Atlanta–Fulton County Stadium, Atlanta Braves	NBC	Curt Gowdy	Tony Kubek			
1971	Tiger Stadium, Detroit Tigers	NBC	Curt Gowdy	Tony Kubek	Lindsey Nelson		
1970	Riverfront Stadium, Cincinnati Reds	NBC	Curt Gowdy	Tony Kubek and Mickey Mantle	Lindsey Nelson		

==== Notes ====
- 1976 – The ABC team of Bob Prince, Bob Uecker, and Warner Wolf alternated roles for the broadcast. For the first three innings, Prince did play-by-play with Wolf on color commentary and Uecker doing field interviews. Uecker worked play-by-play with Prince on color, and Wolf did the interviews for the middle three innings. For the rest of the game, Wolf worked play-by-play with Uecker on color, and Prince did interviews.
  - ABC aired Democratic National Convention coverage from roughly 7:30-8 p.m. EDT prior to the game and another half hour after the game.

=== 1960s ===
Year	Venue/Host team	Network	Play-by-play	Color commentator(s)
1969	Robert F. Kennedy Memorial Stadium, Washington Senators	NBC	Curt Gowdy	Tony Kubek and Mickey Mantle
1968	Astrodome, Houston Astros	NBC	Curt Gowdy	Pee Wee Reese and Sandy Koufax
1967	Anaheim Stadium, California Angels	NBC	Curt Gowdy	Pee Wee Reese and Sandy Koufax
1966	Busch Stadium, St. Louis Cardinals	NBC	Curt Gowdy	Pee Wee Reese
1965	Metropolitan Stadium, Minnesota Twins	NBC	Jack Buck	Joe Garagiola
1964	Shea Stadium, New York Mets	NBC	Lindsey Nelson	Buddy Blattner
1963	Municipal Stadium, Cleveland Indians	NBC	Vin Scully	Joe Garagiola
1962 (1st game)	D.C. Stadium, Washington Senators	NBC	Mel Allen	Joe Garagiola
1962 (2nd game)	Wrigley Field, Chicago Cubs	NBC	Vin Scully	Curt Gowdy
1961 (1st game)	Candlestick Park, San Francisco Giants	NBC	Mel Allen	Russ Hodges
1961 (2nd game)	Fenway Park, Boston Red Sox	NBC	Curt Gowdy	Joe Garagiola
1960 (1st game)	Municipal Stadium, Kansas City Athletics	NBC	Curt Gowdy	Russ Hodges
1960 (2nd game)	Yankee Stadium, New York Yankees	NBC	Mel Allen	Vin Scully

==== Notes ====
- The 1967 All-Star Game in Anaheim can be considered the first "prime time" telecast of a Major League Baseball All-Star Game. The game started at approximately 7 p.m. on the East Coast. Sports Illustrated, noting that the game “began at 4 p.m. in California and ended at 11 p.m. Eastern Daylight Time,” reported “an estimated 55 million people watched the game, compared with 12 million viewers for the 1966 All-Star Game, played in the afternoon.”
  - Buddy Blattner, broadcaster for the host California Angels, appeared briefly at the beginning of the NBC telecast to introduce viewers to Anaheim Stadium before moving to the NBC Radio booth for the game itself. Houston Astros announcer Gene Elston was used in the same role for the 1968 game at the Astrodome.
- The 1969 game was originally scheduled for the evening of Tuesday, July 22, but heavy rains forced its postponement to the following afternoon. The 1969 contest remains the last All-Star Game to date to be played earlier than prime time in the Eastern United States.
  - Charlie Jones served as an "in-the-stands" reporter for NBC's coverage.

=== 1950s ===
Year	Venue/Host team	Network	Play-by-play	Color commentator
1959 (1st game)	Forbes Field, Pittsburgh Pirates	NBC	Mel Allen	Curt Gowdy
1959 (2nd game)	Memorial Coliseum, Los Angeles Dodgers	NBC	Mel Allen	Vin Scully
1958	Memorial Stadium, Baltimore Orioles	NBC	Mel Allen	Al Helfer
1957	Sportsman's Park, St. Louis Cardinals	NBC	Mel Allen	Al Helfer
1956	Griffith Stadium, Washington Senators	NBC	Mel Allen	Al Helfer
1955	County Stadium, Milwaukee Braves	NBC	Mel Allen	Al Helfer
1954	Municipal Stadium, Cleveland Indians	NBC	Mel Allen	Gene Kelly
1953	Crosley Field, Cincinnati Reds	NBC	Jack Brickhouse	Mel Allen
1952	Shibe Park, Philadelphia Phillies	NBC	Jack Brickhouse	Al Helfer
1951	Briggs Stadium, Detroit Tigers	NBC	Jack Brickhouse	Jim Britt
1950	Comiskey Park, Chicago White Sox	NBC	Jack Brickhouse	

==== Notes ====
- During the 1955 All-Star Game, NBC director Harry Coyle introduced the center field pitcher-batter camera shot to supplement the standard behind home-plate view. The angle allowed viewers to follow the ball from the pitcher's hand all the way into the catcher's mitt.
- The 1952 All-Star Game in Philadelphia was the first nationally televised All-Star Game, but it was shortened by rain.
- In 1950, the Mutual Broadcasting System acquired the television broadcast rights to the World Series and All-Star Game for the next six years. Mutual may have been reindulging in TV network dreams or simply taking advantage of a long-standing business relationship; in either case, the broadcast rights were sold to NBC in time for the following season's games at an enormous profit.

=== 1940s ===
Year	Venue/Host team	Network	Play-by-play
1949	Ebbets Field, Brooklyn Dodgers	CBS	Red Barber
1948	Sportsman's Park, St. Louis Browns	KSD	Bob Ingham

== Radio ==
=== 2020s ===
Year	Venue/Host team	Network	Play-by-play	Color commentator	Reporters	Studio host
2026	Citizens Bank Park, Philadelphia Phillies	ESPN	Karl Ravech	Doug Glanville	Buster Olney and Tim Kurkjian	Jim Basquil
2025	Truist Park, Atlanta Braves	ESPN	Karl Ravech	Doug Glanville	Tim Kurkjian	Jim Basquil
2024	Globe Life Field, Texas Rangers	ESPN	Karl Ravech	Doug Glanville	Buster Olney and Tim Kurkjian	Marc Kestecher
2023	T-Mobile Park, Seattle Mariners	ESPN	Jon Sciambi	Doug Glanville	Buster Olney and Tim Kurkjian	Kevin Winter
2022	Dodger Stadium, Los Angeles Dodgers	ESPN	Jon Sciambi	Doug Glanville	Buster Olney and Tim Kurkjian	Marc Kestecher
2021	Coors Field, Colorado Rockies	ESPN	Jon Sciambi	Chris Singleton	Buster Olney and Tim Kurkjian	Kevin Winter
2020	Not held because of the COVID-19 pandemic					

=== 2010s ===
Year	Venue/Host team	Network	Play-by-play	Color commentator(s)	Reporters	Studio host
2019	Progressive Field, Cleveland Indians	ESPN	Jon Sciambi	Chris Singleton	Buster Olney and Tim Kurkjian	Marc Kestecher
2018	Nationals Park, Washington Nationals	ESPN	Jon Sciambi	Chris Singleton	Buster Olney and Tim Kurkjian	Marc Kestecher
2017	Marlins Park, Miami Marlins	ESPN	Jon Sciambi	Chris Singleton	Buster Olney and Tim Kurkjian	Marc Kestecher
2016	Petco Park, San Diego Padres	ESPN	Jon Sciambi	Chris Singleton	Peter Pascarelli and Tim Kurkjian	Marc Kestecher
2015	Great American Ball Park, Cincinnati Reds	ESPN	Jon Sciambi	Chris Singleton	Peter Pascarelli and Tim Kurkjian	Marc Kestecher
2014	Target Field, Minnesota Twins	ESPN	Jon Sciambi	Chris Singleton	Peter Pascarelli and Tim Kurkjian	Marc Kestecher
2013	Citi Field, New York Mets	ESPN	Jon Sciambi	Chris Singleton	Peter Pascarelli and Tim Kurkjian	Marc Kestecher
2012	Kauffman Stadium, Kansas City Royals	ESPN	Jon Sciambi	Chris Singleton	Peter Pascarelli and John Rooney	Marc Kestecher
2011	Chase Field, Arizona Diamondbacks	ESPN	Jon Sciambi	Chris Singleton	Peter Pascarelli and John Rooney	Marc Kestecher
2010	Angel Stadium of Anaheim, Los Angeles Angels of Anaheim	ESPN	Jon Sciambi	Dave Campbell	Peter Pascarelli and John Rooney	Marc Kestecher

=== 2000s ===
Year	Venue/Host team	Network	Play-by-play	Color commentator	Reporter(s)	Studio host
2009	Busch Stadium, St. Louis Cardinals	ESPN	Dan Shulman	Dave Campbell	Peter Pascarelli and John Rooney	Marc Kestecher
2008	Yankee Stadium, New York Yankees	ESPN	Dan Shulman	Dave Campbell	Peter Pascarelli and John Rooney	Marc Kestecher
2007	AT&T Park, San Francisco Giants	ESPN	Dan Shulman	Dave Campbell	Peter Pascarelli and John Rooney	Joe D'Ambrosio
2006	PNC Park, Pittsburgh Pirates	ESPN	Dan Shulman	Dave Campbell	Peter Pascarelli and John Rooney	Joe D'Ambrosio
2005	Comerica Park, Detroit Tigers	ESPN	Dan Shulman	Dave Campbell	Peter Pascarelli and John Rooney	Joe D'Ambrosio
2004	Minute Maid Park, Houston Astros	ESPN	Dan Shulman	Dave Campbell	Peter Pascarelli and John Rooney	Joe D'Ambrosio
2003	U.S. Cellular Field, Chicago White Sox	ESPN	Dan Shulman	Dave Campbell	—N/a	Joe D'Ambrosio
2002	Miller Park, Milwaukee Brewers	ESPN	Dan Shulman	Dave Campbell	—N/a	Joe D'Ambrosio
2001	Safeco Field, Seattle Mariners	ESPN	Charley Steiner	Dave Campbell	—N/a	Joe D'Ambrosio
2000	Turner Field, Atlanta Braves	ESPN	Charley Steiner	Dave Campbell	Karl Ravech	Joe D'Ambrosio

=== 1990s ===
Year	Venue/Host team	Network	Play-by-play	Color commentator(s)
1999	Fenway Park, Boston Red Sox	ESPN	Charley Steiner	Dave Campbell
1998	Coors Field, Colorado Rockies	ESPN	Charley Steiner	Kevin Kennedy
1997	Jacobs Field, Cleveland Indians	CBS	John Rooney	Jerry Coleman and Jeff Torborg
1996	Veterans Stadium, Philadelphia Phillies	CBS	John Rooney	Jim Hunter
1995	The Ballpark in Arlington, Texas Rangers	CBS	John Rooney	Jerry Coleman and Jeff Torborg
1994	Three Rivers Stadium, Pittsburgh Pirates	CBS	John Rooney	Jerry Coleman and Jeff Torborg
1993	Oriole Park at Camden Yards, Baltimore Orioles	CBS	John Rooney	Jerry Coleman and Johnny Bench
1992	Jack Murphy Stadium, San Diego Padres	CBS	John Rooney	Jerry Coleman and Johnny Bench
1991	SkyDome, Toronto Blue Jays	CBS	John Rooney	Jerry Coleman and Johnny Bench
1990	Wrigley Field, Chicago Cubs	CBS	John Rooney	Jerry Coleman and Johnny Bench

=== 1980s ===
Year	Venue/Host team	Network	Play-by-play	Color commentator(s)
1989	Anaheim Stadium, California Angels	CBS	Brent Musburger	Jerry Coleman and Johnny Bench
1988	Riverfront Stadium, Cincinnati Reds	CBS	Brent Musburger	Jerry Coleman and Johnny Bench
1987	Oakland–Alameda County Coliseum, Oakland Athletics	CBS	Brent Musburger	Jerry Coleman and Johnny Bench
1986	Astrodome, Houston Astros	CBS	Brent Musburger	Jerry Coleman and Johnny Bench
1985	Hubert H. Humphrey Metrodome, Minnesota Twins	CBS	Brent Musburger	Jerry Coleman and Johnny Bench
1984	Candlestick Park, San Francisco Giants	CBS	Brent Musburger	Jerry Coleman and Johnny Bench
1983	Comiskey Park, Chicago White Sox	CBS	Brent Musburger	Duke Snider and Brooks Robinson
1982	Olympic Stadium, Montreal Expos	CBS	Vin Scully	Brent Musburger
1981	Cleveland Stadium, Cleveland Indians	CBS	Vin Scully	Win Elliot and Herb Score
1980	Dodger Stadium, Los Angeles Dodgers	CBS	Vin Scully	Brent Musburger

=== 1970s ===
Year	Venue/Host team	Network	Play-by-play	Color commentator(s)
1979	Kingdome, Seattle Mariners	CBS	Vin Scully	Brent Musburger and Jerry Coleman
1978	San Diego Stadium, San Diego Padres	CBS	Vin Scully	Brent Musburger and Jerry Coleman
1977	Yankee Stadium, New York Yankees	CBS	Vin Scully	Brent Musburger
1976	Veterans Stadium, Philadelphia Phillies	CBS	Jack Buck	Brent Musburger and Andy Musser
1975	County Stadium, Milwaukee Brewers	NBC	Jim Simpson	Maury Wills
1974	Three Rivers Stadium, Pittsburgh Pirates	NBC	Jim Simpson	Maury Wills
1973	Royals Stadium, Kansas City Royals	NBC	Jim Simpson	Maury Wills
1972	Atlanta–Fulton County Stadium, Atlanta Braves	NBC	Jim Simpson	Sandy Koufax
1971	Tiger Stadium, Detroit Tigers	NBC	Jim Simpson	Sandy Koufax
1970	Riverfront Stadium, Cincinnati Reds	NBC	Jim Simpson	Sandy Koufax

=== 1960s ===
Year	Venue/Host team	Network	Play-by-play	Color commentator(s)/Secondary play-by-play
1969	Robert F. Kennedy Memorial Stadium, Washington Senators	NBC	Jim Simpson	Sandy Koufax
1968	Astrodome, Houston Astros	NBC	Jim Simpson	Tony Kubek and Gene Elston
1967	Anaheim Stadium, California Angels	NBC	Jim Simpson	Tony Kubek and Buddy Blattner
1966	Busch Stadium, St. Louis Cardinals	NBC	Jim Simpson	Tony Kubek
1965	Metropolitan Stadium, Minnesota Twins	NBC	Herb Carneal	Bob Prince
1964	Shea Stadium, New York Mets	NBC	Blaine Walsh	Dan Daniels
1963	Municipal Stadium, Cleveland Indians	NBC	Bob Neal	George Bryson
1962 (1st game)	D.C. Stadium, Washington Senators	NBC	Lindsey Nelson	John MacLean
1962 (2nd game)	Wrigley Field, Chicago Cubs	NBC	Jack Quinlan	George Kell
1961 (1st game)	Candlestick Park, San Francisco Giants	NBC	Jimmy Dudley	Jerry Doggett
1961 (2nd game)	Fenway Park, Boston Red Sox	NBC	Blaine Walsh	Ernie Harwell
1960 (1st game)	Municipal Stadium, Kansas City Athletics	NBC	Merle Harmon	Jack Quinlan
1960 (2nd game)	Yankee Stadium, New York Yankees	NBC	Bob Elson	Waite Hoyt

=== 1950s ===
Year	Venue/Host team	Network	Play-by-play	Color commentator/Secondary play-by-play
1959 (1st game)	Forbes Field, Pittsburgh Pirates	NBC	Jack Brickhouse	Bob Prince
1959 (2nd game)	Memorial Coliseum, Los Angeles Dodgers	NBC	Bob Neal	Russ Hodges
1958	Memorial Stadium, Baltimore Orioles	NBC	Bob Neal	Ernie Harwell
1957	Sportsman's Park, St. Louis Cardinals	NBC	Bob Neal	Harry Caray
1956	Griffith Stadium, Washington Senators	Mutual	Bob Neal	Bob Wolff
1955	County Stadium, Milwaukee Braves	Mutual	Bob Neal	Earl Gillespie
1954	Municipal Stadium, Cleveland Indians	Mutual	Al Helfer	Jimmy Dudley
1953	Crosley Field, Cincinnati Reds	Mutual	Al Helfer	Waite Hoyt
1952	Shibe Park, Philadelphia Phillies	Mutual	Al Helfer	Gene Kelly
1951	Briggs Stadium, Detroit Tigers	Mutual	Al Helfer	Mel Allen
1950	Comiskey Park, Chicago White Sox	Mutual	Mel Allen	Jim Britt

=== 1940s ===
Year	Venue/Host team	Network	Play-by-play	Color commentator(s)/Secondary play-by-play
1949	Ebbets Field, Brooklyn Dodgers	Mutual	Mel Allen	Jim Britt
1948	Sportsman's Park, St. Louis Browns	Mutual	Mel Allen	Jim Britt and France Laux
1947	Wrigley Field, Chicago Cubs	Mutual	Mel Allen	Jim Britt
1946	Fenway Park, Boston Red Sox	Mutual	Mel Allen	Jim Britt and Bill Corum
1945	Not held because of World War II			
1944	Forbes Field, Pittsburgh Pirates	Mutual	Don Dunphy	Bill Slater and Bill Corum
1943	Shibe Park, Philadelphia Athletics	Mutual	Mel Allen	Red Barber and Bill Corum
1942	Polo Grounds, New York Giants (first game; July 6)	Mutual	Bob Elson	Mel Allen and Jim Britt (first game)
1942	Cleveland Municipal Stadium, Cleveland Indians (second game; July 8)	Mutual	Bob Elson	Waite Hoyt and Jack Graney (second game)
1941	Briggs Stadium, Detroit Tigers	Mutual	Red Barber	Bob Elson
1941	Briggs Stadium, Detroit Tigers	CBS	Mel Allen	France Laux
1941	Briggs Stadium, Detroit Tigers	WWJ	Ty Tyson	
1941	Briggs Stadium, Detroit Tigers	WXYZ	Harry Heilmann	
1940	Sportsman's Park, St. Louis Cardinals	Mutual	Red Barber	Bob Elson
1940	Sportsman's Park, St. Louis Cardinals	CBS	Mel Allen	France Laux
1940	Sportsman's Park, St. Louis Cardinals	NBC	Tom Manning	Ray Schmidt and Alex Buchan
1940	Sportsman's Park, St. Louis Cardinals	KWK	Johnny O'Hara	Johnny Neblett

=== 1930s ===
Year	Venue/Host team	Network	Play-by-play	Color commentator(s)/Secondary play-by-play
1939	Yankee Stadium, New York Yankees	Mutual	Red Barber and Bob Elson	Al Helfer
1939	Yankee Stadium, New York Yankees	CBS	France Laux and Arch McDonald	Mel Allen
1939	Yankee Stadium, New York Yankees	NBC	Tom Manning and Paul Douglas	Warren Brown
1938	Crosley Field, Cincinnati Reds	Mutual	Bob Elson	Dick Bray
1938	Crosley Field, Cincinnati Reds	CBS	Bill Dyer	France Laux
1938	Crosley Field, Cincinnati Reds	NBC	Tom Manning	Red Barber
1937	Griffith Stadium, Washington Senators	Mutual	Bob Elson	Tony Wakeman
1937	Griffith Stadium, Washington Senators	CBS	France Laux	Bill Dyer and Arch McDonald
1937	Griffith Stadium, Washington Senators	NBC	Tom Manning	Warren Brown
1936	National League Park, Boston Bees	Mutual	Fred Hoey	Linus Travers
1936	National League Park, Boston Bees	CBS	Arch McDonald	Dolly Stark
1936	National League Park, Boston Bees	NBC	Hal Totten and Tom Manning	Graham McNamee
1935	Municipal Stadium, Cleveland Indians	Mutual	Bob Elson	Ellis Vander Pyl
1935	Municipal Stadium, Cleveland Indians	CBS	Jack Graney	France Laux
1935	Municipal Stadium, Cleveland Indians	NBC	Tom Manning	Graham McNamee
1934	Polo Grounds, New York Giants	CBS	France Laux	Ted Husing
1934	Polo Grounds, New York Giants	NBC	Tom Manning	Graham McNamee and Ford Bond
1933	Comiskey Park, Chicago White Sox	CBS	Pat Flanagan	Johnny O'Hara
1933	Comiskey Park, Chicago White Sox	NBC	Tom Manning	Graham McNamee

==== Notes ====
- Up until at least, the late 1970s-early 1980s, a majority of the radio announcing crews for the All-Star Game split play-by-play duties, doing either the first 4½ or last 4½ innings.
