= List of Major League Baseball All-Star Games =

Ninety-six Major League Baseball All-Star Games have been played since the inaugural game in 1933. The American League (AL) leads the series with a 49–45–2 (.521) record, and a 398–386 run advantage. The NL's longest winning streak is 11 games from 1972 to 1982; the AL held a 13-game unbeaten streak from 1997 to 2009 (including a tie in 2002). The AL previously dominated from 1933 to 1949, winning 12 of the first 16. The NL dominated from 1950 to 1987, going 33–8–1, including a stretch from 1963 to 1982 when they won 19 of 20. Since 1988, the AL has dominated, going 29–8–1. In 2018, the AL took its first lead in the series since 1963.

The "home team" has traditionally been the league in which the host franchise plays its games; however, the AL was designated the home team for the 2016 All-Star Game, despite it being played in Petco Park, home of the National League's San Diego Padres. This decision was made following the announcement of Miami as host for the 2017 All-Star Game, which was the third consecutive year in which the game was hosted in an NL ballpark. The criteria for choosing the venue are subjective; for the most part, cities with new parks and cities who have not hosted the game in a long time—or ever—tend to get the nod. In the first two decades of the game there were two pairs of teams that shared ballparks, located in Philadelphia and St. Louis. This led to some shorter gaps between the use of those venues than usual: the Cardinals hosted the game in 1940 and the Browns in 1948, while Athletics hosted in 1943, followed by their crosstown rival Phillies in 1952.

There were two All-Star Games played annually for four seasons, from 1959 through 1962. The All-Star Game Most Valuable Player (MVP) Award was introduced in 1962 and the first recipient was Maury Wills of the Los Angeles Dodgers. The 2008 game featured the longest All-Star Game by time: 4 hours 50 minutes, and tied for innings at 15 with the 1967 game.

== Game results ==
Date	Winning League (All-Time Record)	Score	Venue	Host Team	Attendance	MVP	Winning pitcher	Losing pitcher
July 6, 1933	American (1–0–0 AL)	4–2	Comiskey Park	Chicago White Sox	47,595		Lefty Gomez, New York (AL)	Bill Hallahan, St. Louis (NL)
July 10, 1934	American (2–0–0 AL)	9–7	Polo Grounds	New York Giants	48,368		Mel Harder, Cleveland (AL)	Van Mungo, Brooklyn (NL)
July 8, 1935	American (3–0–0 AL)	4–1	Cleveland Stadium	Cleveland Indians	69,812		Lefty Gomez, New York (AL)	Bill Walker, St. Louis (NL)
July 7, 1936	National (3–1–0 AL)	4–3	Braves Field	Boston Bees	25,556		Dizzy Dean, St. Louis (NL)	Lefty Grove, Boston, (AL)
July 7, 1937	American (4–1–0 AL)	8–3	Griffith Stadium	Washington Senators	31,391		Lefty Gomez, New York (AL)	Dizzy Dean, St. Louis (NL)
July 6, 1938	National (4–2–0 AL)	4–1	Crosley Field	Cincinnati Reds	27,067		Johnny Vander Meer, Cincinnati (NL)	Lefty Gomez, New York (AL)
July 11, 1939	American (5–2–0 AL)	3–1	Yankee Stadium	New York Yankees	62,892		Tommy Bridges, Detroit (AL)	Bill Lee, Chicago (NL)
July 9, 1940	National (5–3–0 AL)	4–0	Sportsman's Park	St. Louis Cardinals	32,373		Paul Derringer, Cincinnati (NL)	Red Ruffing, New York (AL)
July 8, 1941	American (6–3–0 AL)	7–5	Briggs Stadium	Detroit Tigers	54,674		Eddie Smith, Chicago (AL)	Claude Passeau, Chicago (NL)
July 6, 1942	American (7–3–0 AL)	3–1	Polo Grounds	New York Giants	34,178		Spud Chandler, New York (AL)	Mort Cooper, St. Louis (NL)
July 13, 1943	American (8–3–0 AL)	5–3	Shibe Park	Philadelphia Athletics	31,938		Dutch Leonard, Washington (AL)	Mort Cooper, St. Louis (NL)
July 11, 1944	National (8–4–0 AL)	7–1	Forbes Field	Pittsburgh Pirates	29,589		Ken Raffensberger, Philadelphia (NL)	Tex Hughson, Boston (AL)
July 10, 1945	Game canceled due to World War II-related travel restrictions. Game was originally scheduled to be held at Fenway Park in Boston, Massachusetts.							
July 9, 1946	American (9–4–0 AL)	12–0	Fenway Park	Boston Red Sox	34,906		Bob Feller, Cleveland (AL)	Claude Passeau, Chicago (NL)
July 8, 1947	American (10–4–0 AL)	2–1	Wrigley Field	Chicago Cubs	41,123		Spec Shea, New York (AL)	Johnny Sain, Boston (NL)
July 13, 1948	American (11–4–0 AL)	5–2	Sportsman's Park	St. Louis Browns	34,009		Vic Raschi, New York (AL)	Johnny Schmitz, Chicago (NL)
July 12, 1949	American (12–4–0 AL)	11–7	Ebbets Field	Brooklyn Dodgers	32,577		Virgil Trucks, Detroit (AL)	Don Newcombe, Brooklyn (NL)
July 11, 1950	National (12–5–0 AL)	4–3 (14)	Comiskey Park	Chicago White Sox	46,127		Ewell Blackwell, Cincinnati (NL)	Ted Gray, Detroit (AL)
July 10, 1951	National (12–6–0 AL)	8–3	Briggs Stadium	Detroit Tigers	52,075		Sal Maglie, New York (NL)	Ed Lopat, New York (AL)
July 8, 1952	National (12–7–0 AL)	3–2 (5)	Shibe Park	Philadelphia Phillies	32,785		Bob Rush, Chicago (NL)	Bob Lemon, Cleveland (AL)
July 14, 1953	National (12–8–0 AL)	5–1	Crosley Field	Cincinnati Reds	30,846		Warren Spahn, Milwaukee (NL)	Allie Reynolds, New York (AL)
July 13, 1954	American (13–8–0 AL)	11–9	Cleveland Stadium	Cleveland Indians	69,751		Dean Stone, Washington (AL)	Gene Conley, Milwaukee (NL)
July 12, 1955	National (13–9–0 AL)	6–5 (12)	County Stadium	Milwaukee Braves	45,643		Gene Conley, Milwaukee (NL)	Frank Sullivan, Boston (AL)
July 10, 1956	National (13–10–0 AL)	7–3	Griffith Stadium	Washington Senators	28,843		Bob Friend, Pittsburgh (NL)	Billy Pierce, Chicago (AL)
July 9, 1957	American (14–10–0 AL)	6–5	Sportsman's Park	St. Louis Cardinals	30,693		Jim Bunning, Detroit (AL)	Curt Simmons, Philadelphia (NL)
July 8, 1958	American (15–10–0 AL)	4–3	Memorial Stadium	Baltimore Orioles	48,829		Early Wynn, Chicago (AL)	Bob Friend, Pittsburgh (NL)
July 7, 1959	National (15–11–0 AL)	5–4	Forbes Field	Pittsburgh Pirates	35,277		Johnny Antonelli, San Francisco (NL)	Whitey Ford, New York (AL)
August 3, 1959	American (16–11–0 AL)	5–3	Memorial Coliseum	Los Angeles Dodgers	55,105		Jerry Walker, Baltimore (AL)	Don Drysdale, Los Angeles (NL)
July 11, 1960	National (16–12–0 AL)	5–3	Municipal Stadium	Kansas City Athletics	30,619		Bob Friend, Pittsburgh (NL)	Bill Monbouquette, Boston (AL)
July 13, 1960	National (16–13–0 AL)	6–0	Yankee Stadium	New York Yankees	38,362		Vern Law, Pittsburgh (NL)	Whitey Ford, New York (AL)
July 11, 1961	National (16–14–0 AL)	5–4 (10)	Candlestick Park	San Francisco Giants	44,115		Stu Miller, San Francisco (NL)	Hoyt Wilhelm, Baltimore (AL)
July 31, 1961	TIE (16–14–1 AL)	1–1	Fenway Park	Boston Red Sox	31,851	N/A		
July 10, 1962	National (16–15–1 AL)	3–1	D.C. Stadium	Washington Senators	45,480	Maury Wills, Los Angeles (NL)	Juan Marichal, San Francisco (NL)	Camilo Pascual, Minnesota (AL)
July 30, 1962	American (17–15–1 AL)	9–4	Wrigley Field	Chicago Cubs	38,359	Leon Wagner, Los Angeles (AL)	Ray Herbert, Chicago (AL)	Art Mahaffey, Philadelphia (NL)
July 9, 1963	National (17–16–1 AL)	5–3	Cleveland Stadium	Cleveland Indians	44,160	Willie Mays, San Francisco (NL)	Larry Jackson, Chicago (NL)	Jim Bunning, Detroit (AL)
July 7, 1964	National (17–17–1)	7–4	Shea Stadium	New York Mets	50,850	Johnny Callison, Philadelphia (NL)	Juan Marichal, San Francisco (NL)	Dick Radatz, Boston (AL)
July 13, 1965	National (18–17–1 NL)	6–5	Metropolitan Stadium	Minnesota Twins	46,706	Juan Marichal, San Francisco (NL)	Sandy Koufax, Los Angeles (NL)	Sam McDowell, Cleveland (AL)
July 12, 1966	National (19–17–1 NL)	2–1 (10)	Busch Memorial Stadium	St. Louis Cardinals	49,936	Brooks Robinson, Baltimore (AL)	Gaylord Perry, San Francisco (NL)	Pete Richert, Washington (AL)
July 11, 1967	National (20–17–1 NL)	2–1 (15)	Anaheim Stadium	California Angels	46,309	Tony Pérez, Cincinnati Reds (NL)	Don Drysdale, Los Angeles (NL)	Catfish Hunter, Kansas City (AL)
July 9, 1968	National (21–17–1 NL)	1–0	Astrodome	Houston Astros	48,321	Willie Mays, San Francisco (NL)	Don Drysdale, Los Angeles (NL)	Luis Tiant, Cleveland (AL)
July 23, 1969	National (22–17–1 NL)	9–3	RFK Stadium	Washington Senators	45,259	Willie McCovey, San Francisco (NL)	Steve Carlton, St. Louis (NL)	Mel Stottlemyre, New York (AL)
July 14, 1970	National (23–17–1 NL)	5–4 (12)	Riverfront Stadium	Cincinnati Reds	51,838	Carl Yastrzemski, Boston (AL)	Claude Osteen, Los Angeles (NL)	Clyde Wright, California Angels (AL)
July 13, 1971	American (23–18–1 NL)	6–4	Tiger Stadium	Detroit Tigers	53,559	Frank Robinson, Baltimore (AL)	Vida Blue, Oakland (AL)	Dock Ellis, Pittsburgh (NL)
July 25, 1972	National (24–18–1 NL)	4–3 (10)	Atlanta Stadium	Atlanta Braves	53,107	Joe Morgan, Cincinnati (NL)	Tug McGraw, New York (NL)	Dave McNally, Baltimore (AL)
July 24, 1973	National (25–18–1 NL)	7–1	Royals Stadium	Kansas City Royals	40,849	Bobby Bonds, San Francisco (NL)	Rick Wise, St. Louis (NL)	Bert Blyleven, Minnesota (AL)
July 23, 1974	National (26–18–1 NL)	7–2	Three Rivers Stadium	Pittsburgh Pirates	50,706	Steve Garvey, Los Angeles (NL)	Ken Brett, Pittsburgh (NL)	Luis Tiant, Boston (AL)
July 15, 1975	National (27–18–1 NL)	6–3	County Stadium	Milwaukee Brewers	51,480	Bill Madlock, Chicago (NL); Jon Matlack, New York (NL)	Jon Matlack, New York (NL)	Catfish Hunter, New York (AL)
July 13, 1976	National (28–18–1 NL)	7–1	Veterans Stadium	Philadelphia Phillies	63,974	George Foster, Cincinnati (NL)	Randy Jones, San Diego (NL)	Mark Fidrych, Detroit (AL)
July 19, 1977	National (29–18–1 NL)	7–5	Yankee Stadium	New York Yankees	56,683	Don Sutton, Los Angeles (NL)	Don Sutton, Los Angeles (NL)	Jim Palmer, Baltimore (AL)
July 11, 1978	National (30–18–1 NL)	7–3	San Diego Stadium	San Diego Padres	51,549	Steve Garvey, Los Angeles (NL)	Bruce Sutter, Chicago (NL)	Rich Gossage, New York (AL)
July 17, 1979	National (31–18–1 NL)	7–6	Kingdome	Seattle Mariners	58,905	Dave Parker, Pittsburgh (NL)	Bruce Sutter, Chicago (NL)	Jim Kern, Texas (AL)
July 8, 1980	National (32–18–1 NL)	4–2	Dodger Stadium	Los Angeles Dodgers	56,088	Ken Griffey, Sr., Cincinnati (NL)	Jerry Reuss, Los Angeles (NL)	Tommy John, New York (AL)
August 9, 1981	National (33–18–1 NL)	5–4	Cleveland Stadium	Cleveland Indians	72,086	Gary Carter, Montreal (NL)	Vida Blue, San Francisco (NL)	Rollie Fingers, Milwaukee (AL)
July 13, 1982	National (34–18–1 NL)	4–1	Olympic Stadium	Montreal Expos	59,057	Dave Concepción, Cincinnati (NL)	Steve Rogers, Montreal (NL)	Dennis Eckersley, Boston (AL)
July 6, 1983	American (34–19–1 NL)	13–3	Comiskey Park	Chicago White Sox	43,801	Fred Lynn, California (AL)	Dave Stieb, Toronto (AL)	Mario Soto, Cincinnati (NL)
July 10, 1984	National (35–19–1 NL)	3–1	Candlestick Park	San Francisco Giants	57,756	Gary Carter, Montreal (NL)	Charlie Lea, Montreal (NL)	Dave Stieb, Toronto (AL)
July 16, 1985	National (36–19–1 NL)	6–1	Hubert H. Humphrey Metrodome	Minnesota Twins	54,960	LaMarr Hoyt, San Diego (NL)	LaMarr Hoyt, San Diego (NL)	Jack Morris, Detroit (AL)
July 15, 1986	American (36–20–1 NL)	3–2	Astrodome	Houston Astros	45,774	Roger Clemens, Boston (AL)	Roger Clemens, Boston (AL)	Dwight Gooden, New York (NL)
July 14, 1987	National (37–20–1 NL)	2–0 (13)	Oakland–Alameda County Coliseum	Oakland Athletics	49,671	Tim Raines, Montreal (NL)	Lee Smith, Chicago (NL)	Jay Howell, Oakland (AL)
July 12, 1988	American (37–21–1 NL)	2–1	Riverfront Stadium	Cincinnati Reds	55,837	Terry Steinbach, Oakland (AL)	Frank Viola, Minnesota (AL)	Dwight Gooden, New York (NL)
July 11, 1989	American (37–22–1 NL)	5–3	Anaheim Stadium	California Angels	64,036	Bo Jackson, Kansas City (AL)	Nolan Ryan, Texas (AL)	John Smoltz, Atlanta (NL)
July 10, 1990	American (37–23–1 NL)	2–0	Wrigley Field	Chicago Cubs	39,071	Julio Franco, Texas (AL)	Bret Saberhagen, Kansas City (AL)	Jeff Brantley, San Francisco (NL)
July 9, 1991	American (37–24–1 NL)	4–2	SkyDome	Toronto Blue Jays	52,383	Cal Ripken Jr., Baltimore (AL)	Jimmy Key, Toronto (AL)	Dennis Martínez, Montreal (NL)
July 14, 1992	American (37–25–1 NL)	13–6	Jack Murphy Stadium	San Diego Padres	59,372	Ken Griffey Jr., Seattle (AL)	Kevin Brown, Texas (AL)	Tom Glavine, Atlanta (NL)
July 13, 1993	American (37–26–1 NL)	9–3	Oriole Park at Camden Yards	Baltimore Orioles	48,147	Kirby Puckett, Minnesota (AL)	Jack McDowell, Chicago (AL)	John Burkett, San Francisco (NL)
July 12, 1994	National (38–26–1 NL)	8–7 (10)	Three Rivers Stadium	Pittsburgh Pirates	59,568	Fred McGriff, Atlanta (NL)	Doug Jones, Philadelphia (NL)	Jason Bere, Chicago (AL)
July 11, 1995	National (39–26–1 NL)	3–2	The Ballpark in Arlington	Texas Rangers	50,920	Jeff Conine, Florida (NL)	Heathcliff Slocumb, Philadelphia (NL)	Steve Ontiveros, Oakland (AL)
July 9, 1996	National (40–26–1 NL)	6–0	Veterans Stadium	Philadelphia Phillies	62,670	Mike Piazza, Los Angeles (NL)	John Smoltz, Atlanta (NL)	Charles Nagy, Cleveland (AL)
July 8, 1997	American (40–27–1 NL)	3–1	Jacobs Field	Cleveland Indians	44,916	Sandy Alomar Jr., Cleveland (AL)	José Rosado, Kansas City (AL)	Shawn Estes, San Francisco (NL)
July 7, 1998	American (40–28–1 NL)	13–8	Coors Field	Colorado Rockies	51,267	Roberto Alomar, Baltimore (AL)	Bartolo Colón, Cleveland (AL)	Ugueth Urbina, Montreal (NL)
July 13, 1999	American (40–29–1 NL)	4–1	Fenway Park	Boston Red Sox	34,187	Pedro Martínez, Boston (AL)	Pedro Martínez, Boston (AL)	Curt Schilling, Philadelphia (NL)
July 11, 2000	American (40–30–1 NL)	6–3	Turner Field	Atlanta Braves	51,323	Derek Jeter, New York (AL)	James Baldwin, Chicago (AL)	Al Leiter, New York (NL)
July 10, 2001	American (40–31–1 NL)	4–1	Safeco Field	Seattle Mariners	47,364	Cal Ripken Jr., Baltimore (AL)	Freddy García, Seattle (AL)	Chan Ho Park, Los Angeles (NL)
July 9, 2002	TIE (40–31–2 NL)	7–7 (11)	Miller Park	Milwaukee Brewers	41,871	N/A		
July 15, 2003	American (40–32–2 NL)	7–6	U.S. Cellular Field	Chicago White Sox	47,609	Garret Anderson, Anaheim (AL)	Brendan Donnelly, Anaheim (AL)	Éric Gagné, Los Angeles (NL)
July 13, 2004	American (40–33–2 NL)	9–4	Minute Maid Park	Houston Astros	41,886	Alfonso Soriano, Texas (AL)	Mark Mulder, Oakland (AL)	Roger Clemens, Houston (NL)
July 12, 2005	American (40–34–2 NL)	7–5	Comerica Park	Detroit Tigers	41,617	Miguel Tejada, Baltimore (AL)	Mark Buehrle, Chicago (AL)	John Smoltz, Atlanta (NL)
July 11, 2006	American (40–35–2 NL)	3–2	PNC Park	Pittsburgh Pirates	38,904	Michael Young, Texas (AL)	B. J. Ryan, Toronto (AL)	Trevor Hoffman, San Diego (NL)
July 10, 2007	American (40–36–2 NL)	5–4	AT&T Park	San Francisco Giants	43,965	Ichiro Suzuki, Seattle (AL)	Josh Beckett, Boston (AL)	Chris Young, San Diego (NL)
July 15, 2008	American (40–37–2 NL)	4–3 (15)	Yankee Stadium	New York Yankees	55,632	J. D. Drew, Boston (AL)	Scott Kazmir, Tampa Bay (AL)	Brad Lidge, Philadelphia (NL)
July 14, 2009	American (40–38–2 NL)	4–3	Busch Stadium	St. Louis Cardinals	46,760	Carl Crawford, Tampa Bay (AL)	Jonathan Papelbon, Boston (AL)	Heath Bell, San Diego (NL)
July 13, 2010	National (41–38–2 NL)	3–1	Angel Stadium of Anaheim	Los Angeles Angels of Anaheim	45,408	Brian McCann, Atlanta (NL)	Matt Capps, Washington (NL)	Phil Hughes, New York (AL)
July 12, 2011	National (42–38–2 NL)	5–1	Chase Field	Arizona Diamondbacks	49,033	Prince Fielder, Milwaukee (NL)	Tyler Clippard, Washington (NL)	C. J. Wilson, Texas (AL)
July 10, 2012	National (43–38–2 NL)	8–0	Kauffman Stadium	Kansas City Royals	40,933	Melky Cabrera, San Francisco (NL)	Matt Cain, San Francisco (NL)	Justin Verlander, Detroit (AL)
July 16, 2013	American (43–39–2 NL)	3–0	Citi Field	New York Mets	45,186	Mariano Rivera, New York (AL)	Chris Sale, Chicago (AL)	Patrick Corbin, Arizona (NL)
July 15, 2014	American (43–40–2 NL)	5–3	Target Field	Minnesota Twins	41,048	Mike Trout, Los Angeles (AL)	Max Scherzer, Detroit (AL)	Pat Neshek, St. Louis (NL)
July 14, 2015	American (43–41–2 NL)	6–3	Great American Ball Park	Cincinnati Reds	43,656	Mike Trout, Los Angeles (AL)	David Price, Detroit (AL)	Clayton Kershaw, Los Angeles (NL)
July 12, 2016	American (43–42–2 NL)	4–2	Petco Park	San Diego Padres	42,386	Eric Hosmer, Kansas City (AL)	Corey Kluber, Cleveland (AL)	Johnny Cueto, San Francisco (NL)
July 11, 2017	American (43–43–2)	2–1 (10)	Marlins Park	Miami Marlins	37,188	Robinson Canó, Seattle (AL)	Craig Kimbrel, Boston (AL)	Wade Davis, Chicago (NL)
July 17, 2018	American (44–43–2 AL)	8–6 (10)	Nationals Park	Washington Nationals	43,843	Alex Bregman, Houston (AL)	Edwin Diaz, Seattle (AL)	Ross Stripling, Los Angeles (NL)
July 9, 2019	American (45–43–2 AL)	4–3	Progressive Field	Cleveland Indians	36,747	Shane Bieber, Cleveland (AL)	Masahiro Tanaka, New York (AL)	Clayton Kershaw, Los Angeles (NL)
July 14, 2020	Game canceled due to a delay in the start of the 2020 season as a result of the COVID-19 pandemic. Game was originally scheduled to be held at Dodger Stadium in Los Angeles, California.							
July 13, 2021	American (46–43–2 AL)	5–2	Coors Field	Colorado Rockies	49,184	Vladimir Guerrero Jr., Toronto (AL)	Shohei Ohtani, Los Angeles (AL)	Corbin Burnes, Milwaukee (NL)
July 19, 2022	American (47–43–2 AL)	3–2	Dodger Stadium	Los Angeles Dodgers	52,518	Giancarlo Stanton, New York (AL)	Framber Valdez, Houston (AL)	Tony Gonsolin, Los Angeles (NL)
July 11, 2023	National (47–44–2 AL)	3–2	T-Mobile Park	Seattle Mariners	47,159	Elías Díaz, Colorado (NL)	Camilo Doval, San Francisco (NL)	Félix Bautista, Baltimore (AL)
July 16, 2024	American (48–44–2 AL)	5–3	Globe Life Field	Texas Rangers	39,343	Jarren Duran, Boston (AL)	Mason Miller, Oakland (AL)	Hunter Greene, Cincinnati (NL)
July 15, 2025	National (48–45–2 AL)	7–6 (Note: The National League defeated the American League 4–3 in a swing-off tiebreaker.)	Truist Park	Atlanta Braves	41,702	Kyle Schwarber, Philadelphia (NL)	N/A	N/A
July 14, 2026	American (49–45–2 AL)	4–0	Citizens Bank Park	Philadelphia Phillies	43,916	Cody Bellinger, New York (AL)	Dylan Cease, Toronto (AL)	Cristopher Sánchez, Philadelphia (NL)
July 13, 2027			Wrigley Field	Chicago Cubs				

	American League	National League	Notes
Wins	49	45	Ties: 2 (1961, 2002)
Runs	398	386	Most total runs: 21 (1998)

== Future MLB All-Star Games ==
The following future games have had their date and location announced by Major League Baseball.

Date	Host team	Stadium	City	Television	Radio	Ref.
July 13, 2027	Chicago Cubs	Wrigley Field	Chicago, Illinois	Fox	ESPN Radio	
July 2028	San Francisco Giants	Oracle Park	San Francisco, California	TBD	TBD	
July 2029				TBD	TBD	
July 2030				TBD	TBD	

== Notes ==
- Tampa (Tampa Bay Rays) and West Sacramento (Athletics) are the only current MLB cities that have not yet hosted an All-Star Game, with the Rays being the only current MLB team to never host one.
- In addition to Tropicana Field in Tampa, Sutter Health Park in West Sacramento and Yankee Stadium (New York Yankees) are the only current venues that have not yet hosted an All-Star Game. The Yankees and Athletics have hosted the game in previous stadiums.
