= Major League Baseball Most Valuable Player Award (disambiguation) =

The Major League Baseball Most Valuable Player Award is given annually to the league's best performing players of the regular season.

Other MVP awards given by MLB include:

- World Series Most Valuable Player Award
- League Championship Series Most Valuable Player Award
- Major League Baseball All-Star Game Most Valuable Player Award
