= Ben Sheets =

American baseball pitcher (born 1978)

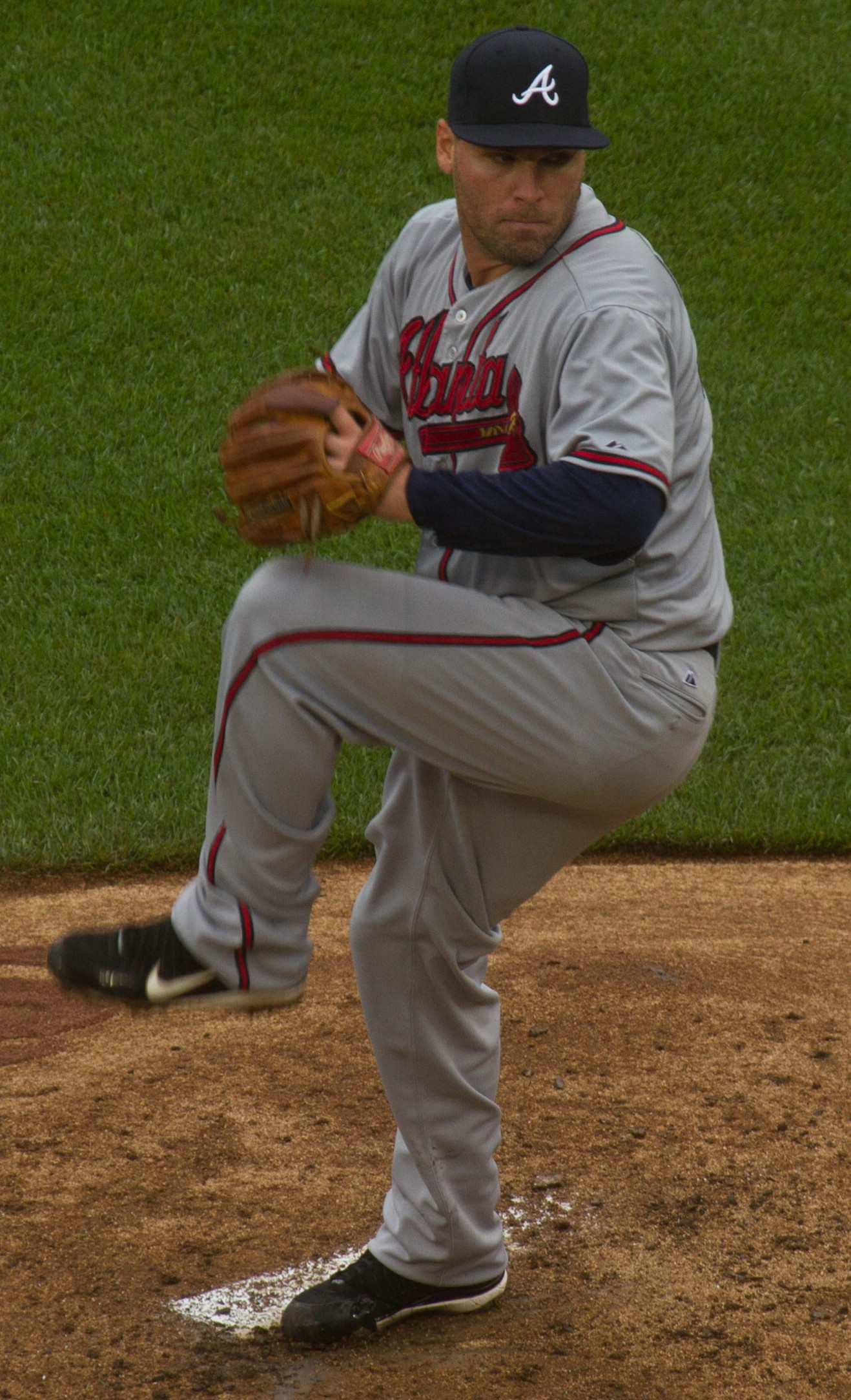
- Sheets with the Atlanta Braves
- Pitcher
- Born: July 18, 1978 (age 48); Baton Rouge, Louisiana, U.S.
- Batted: Right Threw: Right

MLB debut
- April 5, 2001, for the Milwaukee Brewers

Last MLB appearance
- October 3, 2012, for the Atlanta Braves

MLB statistics
- Win–loss record: 94–96
- Earned run average: 3.78
- Strikeouts: 1,325
- Stats at Baseball Reference

Teams
- Milwaukee Brewers (2001–2008); Oakland Athletics (2010); Atlanta Braves (2012)

Career highlights and awards
- 4× All-Star (2001, 2004, 2007, 2008); Milwaukee Brewers Wall of Honor; American Family Field Walk of Fame
Medals
Men's baseball
Representing United States
Olympic Games
Gold medal – first place	2000 Sydney	Team

Ben Michael Sheets (born July 18, 1978) is an American former professional baseball pitcher who played for the Milwaukee Brewers, Oakland Athletics, and Atlanta Braves of Major League Baseball. Sheets is a four-time MLB All-Star (2001, 2004, 2007, and 2008). He won a gold medal at the 2000 Summer Olympics.

== Amateur career ==
Sheets graduated from St. Amant High School in Ascension Parish, Louisiana. He attended Northeast Louisiana University on a college baseball scholarship. He once struck out 20 batters in a game against Louisiana Tech. In the summer of 1998, he played collegiate summer baseball in the Cape Cod Baseball League (CCBL) with the Wareham Gatemen, and returned to the CCBL in 1999 to play with the Orleans Cardinals, where he was a teammate of fellow future Major Leaguer Mark Teixeira. Sheets was inducted into the CCBL Hall of Fame in 2008.

== Professional career ==
=== Draft and minor leagues ===
Drafted by the Milwaukee Brewers in the first round (10th overall) of the 1999 draft, he made his professional debut with the Ogden Raptors of the Pioneer League. In August, against the Idaho Falls Chukars, Sheets struck out eight batters while allowing just one hit through five innings. Later in the month, he was promoted to Class A Stockton of the California League. In his seven minor league starts that year, Sheets averaged a strikeout ratio of 10.09 batters per nine innings.

In 2000, Sheets was on the United States national team for the 2000 Summer Olympics in Sydney. He pitched 22 innings, struck out 11 batters, walked one, and gave up 11 hits during the tournament, and faced off against Cuban ace Pedro Luis Lazo in the gold medal game, giving up three singles and advancing just one runner to second base for the entire game. Sheets gave up no walks and struck out five in a 4–0 complete-game shutout.

=== Milwaukee Brewers (2001–2008) ===
By 2001, Sheets had been promoted to the Brewers' starting rotation. His first two starts resulted in losses, but he won his next four, while pitching to a 1.73 ERA. On May 29, in his ninth career start, he pitched his first shutout, giving up five hits against the St. Louis Cardinals. He ended the season 11–10 with a 4.76 ERA. In 2003, Sheets was troubled by bulging discs in his lower back. "My back has been hurt but you've got to go out there and perform," he said. Over the final two months of the season, Sheets pitched poorly and finished the year 11–13 with a 4.45 ERA.

In 2004, Sheets' trouble with a bulging disc subsided. On June 13, 2004, Sheets struck out all three batters on nine total pitches in the third inning of a 5–4 loss to the Houston Astros, becoming the 26th National League pitcher and the 35th pitcher in major-league history to accomplish an immaculate inning. During 2004, his fastball was being clocked regularly at 96–98 miles per hour (154–158 km/h), primarily a result of improved health. That season he also struck out 18 batters in a May 16, 2004, game against the Atlanta Braves, shattering the franchise record of 14, set by Moose Haas in 1978.

By the end of the season, Sheets established himself as a strikeout threat, throwing 264, to finish second in the National League and third in the majors behind Randy Johnson and Johan Santana. After posting an ERA above 4.00 in his previous three seasons, Sheets compiled a dominant 2.70 ERA and 0.98 WHIP, which ranked Sheets fourth and third, respectively, among all starting pitchers. Most impressively, Sheets amassed only 32 walks, giving Sheets a strikeout-to-walk ratio of over 8:1, far and away the best in the major leagues. A mediocre 12–14 win–loss record during this outstanding season was primarily the result of poor run support. Sheets finished 8th in the Cy Young Award voting.

In response to his success in 2004, the Brewers signed Sheets to a four-year, $38.5 million extension. At that time, it was the largest contract in Brewers history. However, after signing the contract, Sheets struggled with health issues. A series of inner ear infections that caused dizziness and a loss of balance forced Sheets onto the disabled list for a period of time in the beginning of the 2005 season.

Sheets started the 2006 season on the disabled list but quickly came off it only to pitch three starts before going on the DL again with shoulder tendinitis. He returned to the starting rotation two weeks after the All-Star break. Sheets pitched a seven-inning shutout against the Pittsburgh Pirates. In his second game back, he would pitch nearly a complete-game shutout, but in the 9th inning, Sheets gave up a two-run homer to Ken Griffey Jr. of the Reds.

In 2007, Sheets started both his and the Brewers' season on a high note by throwing an Opening Day complete game, two-hitter against the Los Angeles Dodgers. A strained hamstring in August forced him to miss the rest of the 2007 regular season.

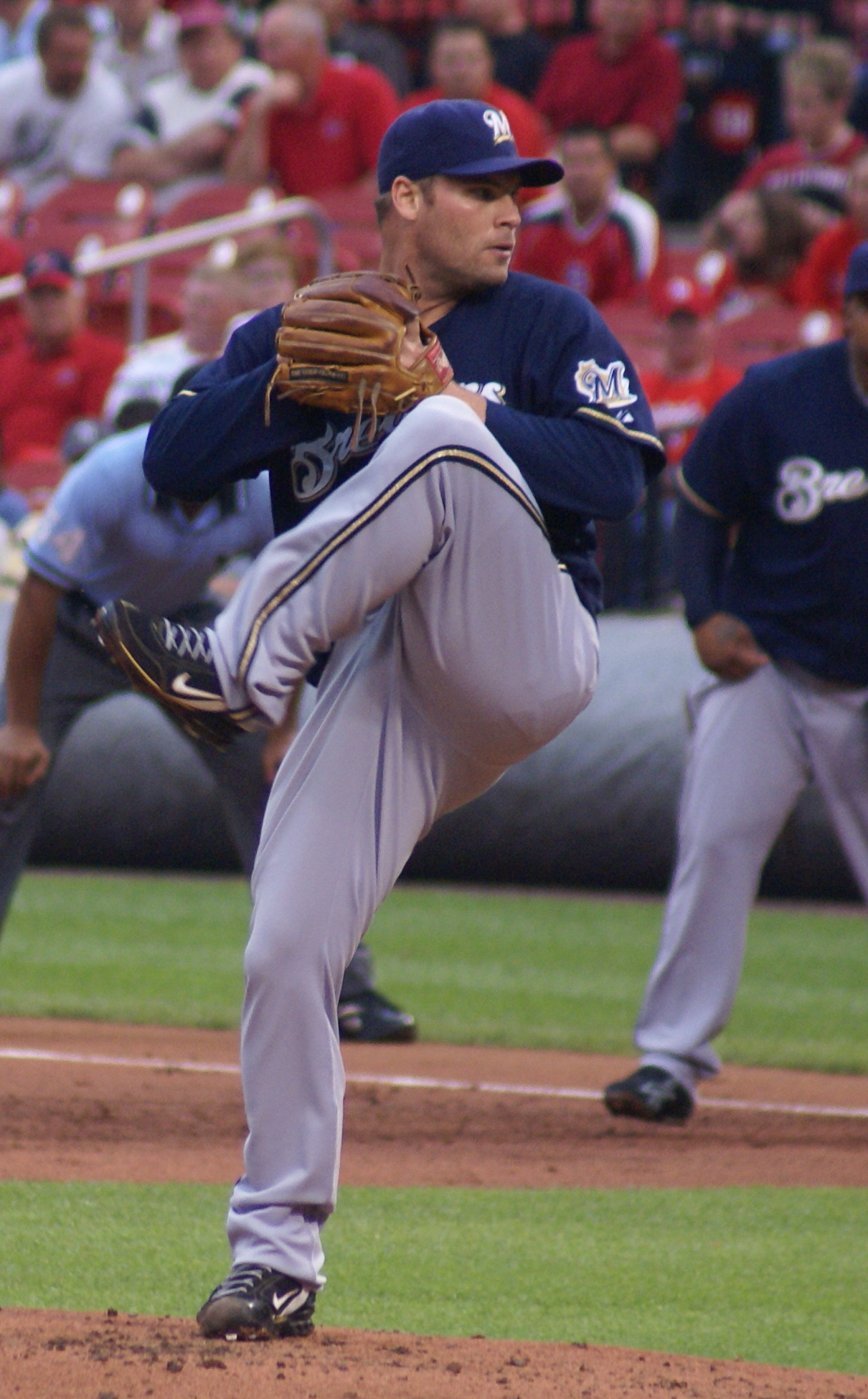
Sheets pitching for the Milwaukee Brewers in 2008

Sheets started on Opening Day 2008 in a 4–3 win over the Cubs. He batted eighth in the lineup, the first Brewers starting pitcher to bat in a position other than ninth. In his second start, Sheets threw only the second complete-game shutout of his career, beating the San Francisco Giants 7–0 in a five-hit, eight-strikeout performance.

On May 10, Sheets struck out St. Louis Cardinals' first baseman Albert Pujols on a breaking ball in the first inning to reach 1,082 strikeouts, breaking Teddy Higuera's club mark. On July 9, Sheets had a season-high 11 strikeouts, including the first seven outs as strikeouts. By mid-July, he was 10–3 with a 2.85 ERA and was chosen as a starting pitcher for the National League in the 2008 All-Star Game. Pitching in his fourth All-Star Game, Sheets became the first Milwaukee Brewer pitcher to start an All-Star Game. In his 2008 All-Star outing, he pitched two scoreless innings, giving up one hit, walking two, and striking out three.

Sheets finished the season with 13–9 with a 3.09 ERA in 31 starts and 198 1/3 innings pitched. He went to a 3–0 count on only 2% of all batters he faced in the season, the lowest percentage in the majors. He also threw curveballs 33% of the time, more than any other starter in the major leagues. At the end of the season, he incurred a tear in his right elbow, underwent Tommy John surgery and did not pitch in the postseason.

In October 2008, Sheets filed for free agency. Most teams were put off by Sheets due to his propensity for injuries. In addition, Sheets was a "type-A" free agent, meaning that if a team signed him before the Rule 4 draft, they would forfeit a draft pick to the Brewers. Sheets ultimately did not play during the 2009 season.

=== Oakland Athletics (2010) ===
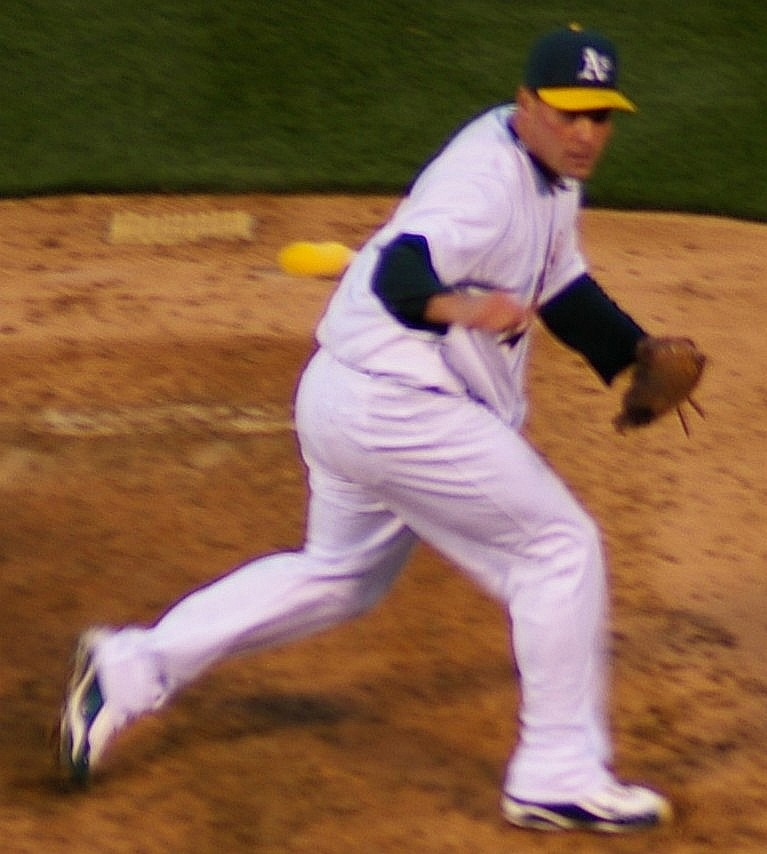
Sheets pitching for the Oakland Athletics in 2010

On January 26, 2010, Sheets agreed to a one-year, $10 million with an additional $2 million in incentives, contract with the Oakland Athletics. Sheets got the Opening Day start, going five innings allowing three runs (two earned) on four hits while striking out three and walking four, receiving a no-decision. The Athletics lost the game in the bottom of the 9th.

On July 29, 2010, the Athletics announced Sheets would miss the remainder of the season due to a torn flexor in his right elbow. His season ended with Sheets going 4–9 in 20 starts.

=== Atlanta Braves (2012) ===
On July 1, 2012, the Atlanta Braves announced that Sheets had signed a minor league contract with the organization in order to attempt a comeback to the major leagues. He made his first minor league start with the Mississippi Braves on July 4, 2012. On July 12, the Braves announced that they had called Sheets up from the minors. Sheets made his first start in nearly two years, on July 15 against the New York Mets. He pitched six scoreless innings, giving up two hits and striking out five to earn the win. After his second start also resulted in no runs given up by Sheets, who pitched six innings of five-hit, six-strikeout ball, he stated, "If you asked me if I'm surprised I haven't given up a run, yeah I am. But I'm not surprised I'm getting people out. I wouldn't have come back if I didn't think I could get people out." Sheets made the final start of his career on October 3, 2012, against the Pirates.

== Personal life ==
Sheets was born on July 18, 1978, in Baton Rouge, Louisiana. During the 2004 season, Sheets resided in St. Amant, Louisiana. In 2008, he was living in Highland Park, Texas. He and his wife Julie have two sons, Seaver (named after Tom Seaver) and Miller Bennett. Sheets is also part owner of the American Hockey League's Milwaukee Admirals. He enjoys Cajun food, including jambalaya and crawfish etouffee. Since 2013, Sheets has been a volunteer baseball coach at his alma mater the University of Louisiana at Monroe. Andy Sheets, a former major league infielder, is a distant cousin.

On June 13, 2014, Sheets was inducted into the Brewers Wall of Honor for pitching over 1,000 innings with the club.

== See also ==
- List of pitchers who have struck out 18 or more batters in a nine-inning baseball game

Awards and achievements
Preceded by Jake Peavy	National League Pitcher of the Month; June 2007	Succeeded by Carlos Zambrano
Preceded by Jake Peavy	National League All-Star Game Starting Pitcher; 2008	Succeeded by Tim Lincecum
