= 2013 Major League Baseball All-Star Game =

2013 American baseball competition

	1	2	3	4	5	6	7	8	9	R	H	E
American League	0	0	0	1	1	0	0	1	0	3	9	0
National League	0	0	0	0	0	0	0	0	0	0	3	0
- Date: July 16, 2013
- Venue: Citi Field
- City: Queens, New York City
- Managers: Jim Leyland (DET); Bruce Bochy (SF)
- MVP: Mariano Rivera (NYY)
- Attendance: 45,186
- Ceremonial first pitch: Tom Seaver
- Television: Fox (United States); MLB International (International)
- TV announcers: Joe Buck, Tim McCarver, Ken Rosenthal and Erin Andrews (Fox); Gary Thorne and Rick Sutcliffe (MLB International)
- Radio: ESPN
- Radio announcers: Jon Sciambi and Chris Singleton

The 2013 Major League Baseball All-Star Game was the 84th edition of the Major League Baseball All-Star Game. It was held on Tuesday, July 16, 2013 at Citi Field in Queens, New York City, the home of the New York Mets. This was the first time that the Mets have hosted an All-Star Game since 1964, the team's inaugural season at Shea Stadium, and the ninth time the All-Star Game was held in New York City. The game was last held in New York City in 2008, when the original Yankee Stadium hosted it in its final season before being demolished. It was televised in the United States on Fox.

The American League shut out the National League for the third time in All-Star game history; the National League has six shutouts. This game marks the first time that there have been shutouts in consecutive All-Star games.

== Host selection ==
The host site was reportedly to either be at Nationals Park in Washington, D.C., home of the Washington Nationals or at Citi Field, the home of the Mets since 2009. The official announcement was made on May 16, 2012, at New York City Hall. The Mets unveiled the logo for the 2013 All-Star Game on August 7, 2012.

== Fan balloting ==
=== Starters ===
Balloting for the 2013 All-Star Game starters began online April 24 and ended on July 4. Fan voting also took place in each MLB stadium, beginning May 7 (at the latest) and ended on June 28. The top vote-getters at each position (including the designated hitter for the American League) and the top three among outfielders, were named the starters for their respective leagues. The results were announced on July 6. Chris Davis was the leading vote-getter with 8,272,243 votes, while Yadier Molina led the NL with 6,883,258 ballots.

=== Final roster spot ===
After the rosters were revealed, a second ballot of five players per league was created for the All-Star Final Vote to determine the 34th and final player of each roster. The online balloting was conducted from July 6 through July 11. The winners of the All-Star Final Vote were Steve Delabar of the Toronto Blue Jays (AL) and Freddie Freeman of the Atlanta Braves (NL).

Player	Team	Pos.	Player	Team	Pos.
American League			National League		
Steve Delabar	Blue Jays	P	Ian Desmond	Nationals	SS
David Robertson	Yankees	P	Freddie Freeman#	Braves	1B
Koji Uehara	Red Sox	P	Adrián González	Dodgers	1B
Tanner Scheppers	Rangers	P	Hunter Pence	Giants	OF
Joaquín Benoit	Tigers	P	Yasiel Puig	Dodgers	OF

== Rosters ==
Players in italics have since been inducted into the National Baseball Hall of Fame.

=== American League ===
Elected starters
Position	Player	Team	All-Star Games
C	Joe Mauer	Twins	6
1B	Chris Davis	Orioles	1
2B	Robinson Canó	Yankees	5
3B	Miguel Cabrera	Tigers	8
SS	J. J. Hardy	Orioles	2
OF	Mike Trout	Angels	2
OF	Adam Jones	Orioles	3
OF	José Bautista	Blue Jays	4
DH	David Ortiz	Red Sox	9

Reserves
Position	Player	Team	All-Star Games
C	Jason Castro	Astros	1
C	Salvador Pérez	Royals	1
1B	Prince Fielder	Tigers	5
2B	Jason Kipnis	Indians	1
2B	Dustin Pedroia	Red Sox	4
2B	Ben Zobrist	Rays	2
3B	Manny Machado	Orioles	1
SS	Jhonny Peralta	Tigers	2
OF	Nelson Cruz	Rangers	2
OF	Alex Gordon	Royals	1
OF	Torii Hunter	Tigers	5
DH	Edwin Encarnación	Blue Jays	1

Pitchers
Player	Team	All-Star Games
Grant Balfour^{[J]}	Athletics	1
Clay Buchholz^{#}	Red Sox	2
Brett Cecil	Blue Jays	1
Bartolo Colón^{#}	Athletics	3
Jesse Crain^{#}	White Sox	1
Steve Delabar^{[D]}	Blue Jays	1
Greg Holland^{[I]}	Royals	1
Félix Hernández	Mariners	4
Hisashi Iwakuma^{#}	Mariners	1
Justin Masterson^{[B]}	Indians	1
Matt Moore^{[C]}	Rays	1
Joe Nathan	Rangers	6
Glen Perkins^{[A]}	Twins	1
Mariano Rivera	Yankees	13
Chris Sale	White Sox	2
Max Scherzer	Tigers	1
Chris Tillman^{[E]}	Orioles	1
Justin Verlander^{#}	Tigers	6
Yu Darvish^{#}	Rangers	2

=== National League ===
Elected starters
Position	Player	Team	All-Star Games
C	Yadier Molina	Cardinals	5
1B	Joey Votto	Reds	4
2B	Brandon Phillips	Reds	3
3B	David Wright	Mets	7
SS	Troy Tulowitzki	Rockies	3
OF	Carlos Beltrán	Cardinals	8
OF	Carlos González	Rockies	2
OF	Bryce Harper	Nationals	2
DH	Michael Cuddyer^{[L]}	Rockies	2

Reserves
Position	Player	Team	All-Star Games
C	Buster Posey	Giants	2
C	Brian McCann^{[H]}	Braves	7
1B	Paul Goldschmidt	Diamondbacks	1
1B	Allen Craig	Cardinals	1
1B	Freddie Freeman^{[D]}^{#}	Braves	1
2B	Matt Carpenter	Cardinals	1
2B	Marco Scutaro	Giants	1
3B	Pedro Álvarez	Pirates	1
SS	Everth Cabrera	Padres	1
SS	Jean Segura	Brewers	1
OF	Domonic Brown	Phillies	1
OF	Carlos Gómez	Brewers	1
OF	Andrew McCutchen	Pirates	3

Pitchers
Player	Team	All-Star Games
Madison Bumgarner	Giants	1
Aroldis Chapman	Reds	2
Patrick Corbin	Diamondbacks	1
José Fernández	Marlins	1
Jason Grilli	Pirates	1
Matt Harvey	Mets	1
Clayton Kershaw	Dodgers	3
Craig Kimbrel	Braves	3
Cliff Lee	Phillies	4
Jeff Locke^{#}	Pirates	1
Mark Melancon^{[F]}	Pirates	1
Edward Mujica^{[K]}	Cardinals	1
Sergio Romo^{[G]}	Giants	1
Adam Wainwright^{#}	Cardinals	2
Travis Wood	Cubs	1
Jordan Zimmermann^{#}	Nationals	1

1. Glen Perkins replaced Clay Buchholz on the roster due to injury.
2. Justin Masterson replaced Jesse Crain on the roster due to injury.
3. Matt Moore replaced Yu Darvish on the roster due to injury.
4. Denotes Final Vote Winner.
5. Chris Tillman replaced Justin Verlander on the roster due to Verlander's ineligibility to pitch.
6. Mark Melancon replaced Jeff Locke on the roster due to injury.
7. Sergio Romo replaced Jordan Zimmermann on the roster due to injury.
8. Brian McCann replaced Freddie Freeman on the roster due to injury.
9. Greg Holland replaced Hisashi Iwakuma on the roster due to Iwakuma's ineligibility to pitch.
10. Grant Balfour replaced Bartolo Colón on the roster due to Colon's ineligibility to pitch.
11. Edward Mujica replaced Adam Wainwright on the roster due to Wainwright's ineligibility to pitch.
12. Michael Cuddyer was selected to start for the National League as their designated hitter

#: Indicates player would not play (replaced as per reference notes above).

== Game summary ==
=== Starters ===
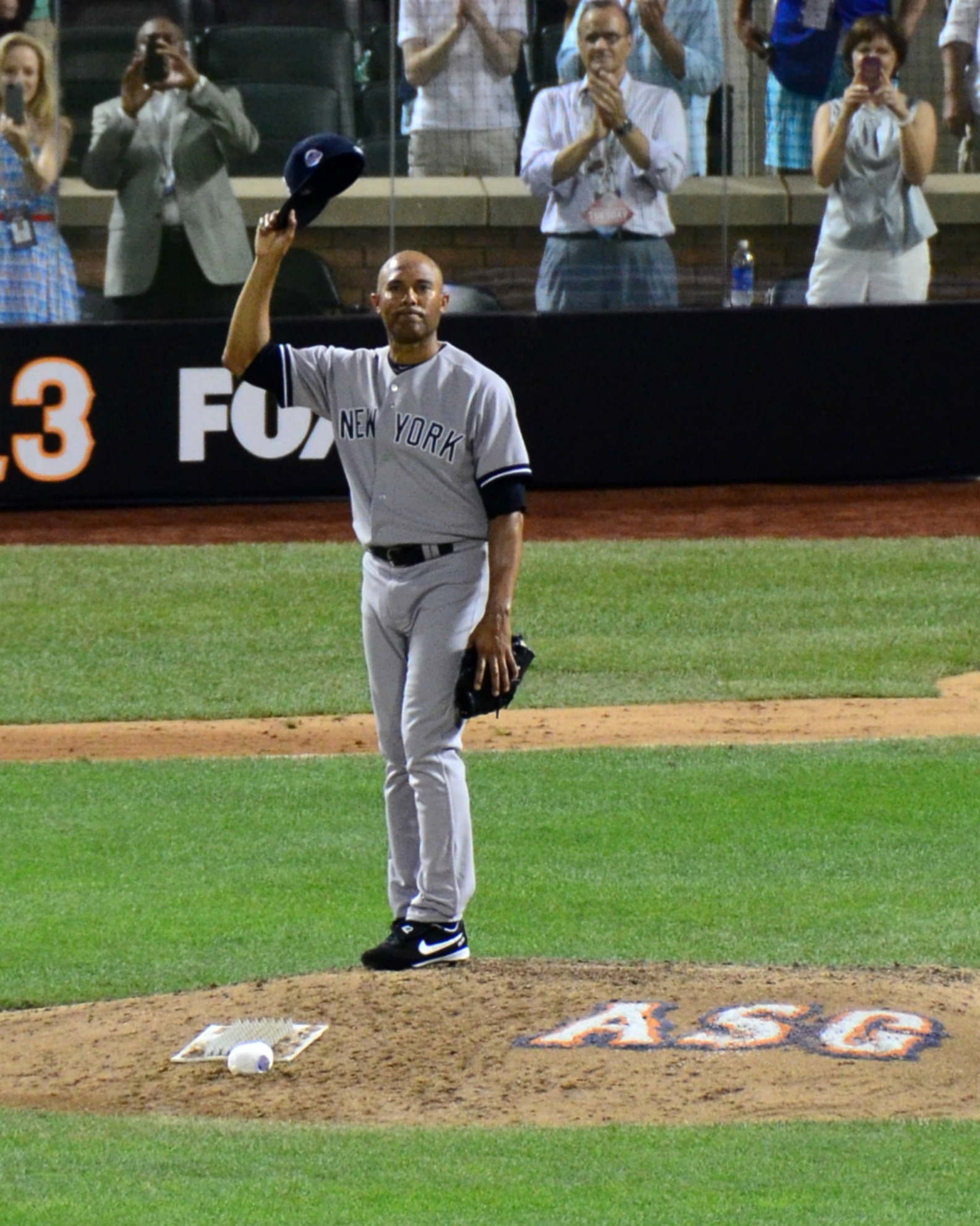
During his entrance in the 8th inning, Mariano Rivera received a standing ovation from both teams and the fans.

American				National			
Order	Player	Team	Position	Order	Player	Team	Position
1	Mike Trout	Angels	LF	1	Brandon Phillips	Reds	2B
2	Robinson Canó	Yankees	2B	2	Carlos Beltrán	Cardinals	RF
3	Miguel Cabrera	Tigers	3B	3	Joey Votto	Reds	1B
4	Chris Davis	Orioles	1B	4	David Wright	Mets	3B
5	José Bautista	Blue Jays	RF	5	Carlos González	Rockies	LF
6	David Ortiz	Red Sox	DH	6	Yadier Molina	Cardinals	C
7	Adam Jones	Orioles	CF	7	Troy Tulowitzki	Rockies	SS
8	Joe Mauer	Twins	C	8	Michael Cuddyer	Rockies	DH
9	J. J. Hardy	Orioles	SS	9	Bryce Harper	Nationals	CF
	Max Scherzer	Tigers	P		Matt Harvey	Mets	P

=== Box score ===
Tuesday, July 16, 2013 8:19 pm (EDT) Citi Field in Queens, New York
Team	1	2	3	4	5	6	7	8	9	R	H	E
American League	0	0	0	1	1	0	0	1	0	3	9	0
National League	0	0	0	0	0	0	0	0	0	0	3	0
Starting pitchers: AL: Max Scherzer; NL: Matt Harvey; WP: Chris Sale (1–0) LP: Patrick Corbin (0–1) Sv: Joe Nathan (1); Home runs: AL: none NL: none

Umpires: Home Plate, crew chief – John Hirschbeck; First Base – Wally Bell; Second Base – Larry Vanover; Third Base – Paul Emmel; Left Field – Rob Drake; Right Field – Chad Fairchild
Weather: Temperature: 90 °F (32 °C), clear; Wind: 9 mph, in from left field
Time of Game: 3:06
Attendance: 45,186

== Notes ==
- The Yankees Mariano Rivera, who retired at the end of the season, was named the All-Star Game Most Valuable Player. Rivera pitched in the 8th inning and retired all 3 batters he faced. He was the first reliever selected to an All-Star team to ever receive the award, as well as the first pitcher since Pedro Martínez in 1999 and the second Yankee ever after Derek Jeter in 2000. Given his pending retirement, the award was given in recognition of his outstanding career, not his performance in the game.
- The attendance of 45,186 was the largest in Citi Field's history.
- Yankees TV announcer Michael Kay joined Sciambi and Singleton in the ESPN Radio call from the 2nd to 4th innings.
- With the shutout, the "home" league did not score a run in 19 straight innings.
- This game featured Tim McCarver's last All-Star Game with Joe Buck on FOX.
- This is the last All-Star Game where teams wore their regular hats.

== See also ==
- List of Major League Baseball All-Star Game winners
- All-Star Futures Game
- Home Run Derby (Major League Baseball)
