= Major League Baseball All-Star Game Most Valuable Player =

Annual baseball award

Ted Williams All-Star Game Most Valuable Player Award
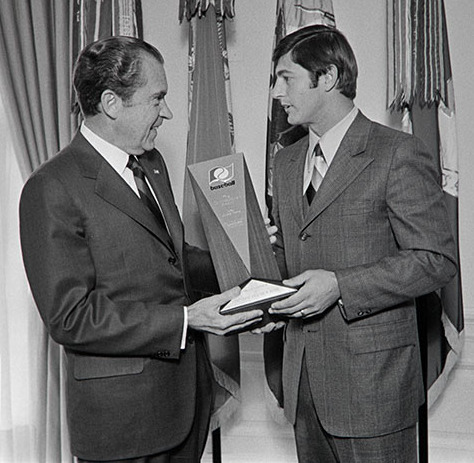
- Carl Yastrzemski (right) presenting his 1970 MLB All-Star Game MVP trophy to U.S. President Richard Nixon
- Sport: Baseball
- League: Major League Baseball
- Awarded for: Most outstanding player in the All-Star Game
- Sponsored by: Chevrolet
- Presented by: Major League Baseball

History
- First award: 1962
- Most recent: Cody Bellinger (2026)

The Major League Baseball All-Star Game Most Valuable Player (MVP) is an annual Major League Baseball (MLB) award that is presented to the most outstanding player in each year's MLB All-Star Game. Awarded each season since 1962 (two games were held and an award was presented to each game winner in 1962), it was originally called the Arch Ward Memorial Award in honor of Arch Ward, who conceived of the All-Star Game in 1933. The award's name was changed to the Commissioner's Trophy in 1970, but this name change was reversed in 1985 when the World Series Trophy was renamed the Commissioner's Trophy. Finally, the trophy was renamed the Ted Williams Most Valuable Player Award in 2002, honoring former Boston Red Sox player Ted Williams, who died earlier that year. No award was presented for the 2002 All-Star Game, which ended in a tie. Thus, the Anaheim Angels' Garret Anderson was the first recipient of the re-named Ted Williams Award in 2003. The award winner receives a glass bat engraved with their name and, due to an advertising agreement, a Chevrolet car or truck. Currently, the winner is chosen based on a vote, with 80 percent coming from writers and broadcasters on-site at the game and 20 percent from an online fan vote.

As of 2025, NL players have won the award 30 times (including one award shared by two players), and American League (AL) players have won 34 times. Baltimore Orioles players have won the most awards for a single franchise (with six); players from the Cincinnati Reds, Los Angeles Dodgers and San Francisco Giants are tied for the most in the NL with five each. Five players have won the award twice: Willie Mays (1963, 1968), Steve Garvey (1974, 1978), Gary Carter (1981, 1984), Cal Ripken Jr. (1991, 2001), and Mike Trout (2014, 2015, the only player to win the award in back-to-back years). The award has been shared by multiple players once; Bill Madlock and Jon Matlack shared the award in 1975. Two players have won the award for a game in which their league lost: Brooks Robinson in 1966 and Carl Yastrzemski in 1970. One pair of awardees were father and son (Ken Griffey Sr. and Ken Griffey Jr.), and another were brothers (Roberto Alomar and Sandy Alomar Jr.). Three players have won the MVP award at a game played in their home ballpark (Sandy Alomar Jr. in 1997, Pedro Martínez in 1999, and Shane Bieber in 2019). Derek Jeter is the only player to win the All-Star Game MVP and World Series MVP in the same season, doing so in 2000.

Among MVP winners who are no longer active players, only five won the award in what turned out to be their only All-Star Game appearance; LaMarr Hoyt, Bo Jackson, J. D. Drew, Melky Cabrera, and Eric Hosmer. Five teams, the Chicago White Sox, Detroit Tigers, Arizona Diamondbacks, St. Louis Cardinals, and Washington Nationals (excluding their predecessor, the Montreal Expos) have never had a player win the award.

== List of winners ==
Key
Year	Links to the article about the corresponding Major League Baseball All-Star Game
Player (X)	Denotes winning player and number of times they had won the award at that point
†	Member of the National Baseball Hall of Fame and Museum
^	Denotes player who is still active
§	Player's league lost the All-Star Game
*	Denotes year in which the award was shared

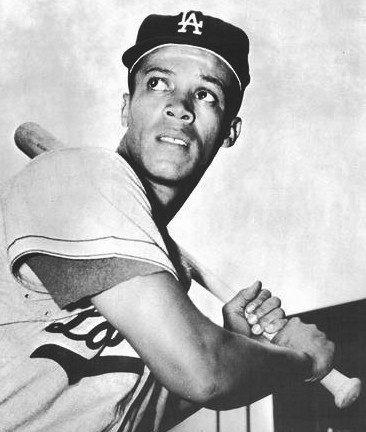
Maury Wills (NL) received the first All-Star Game MVP Award when two All-Star Games were played and two awards (Leon Wagner-AL) were presented as the "Arch Ward Memorial Award" in 1962.

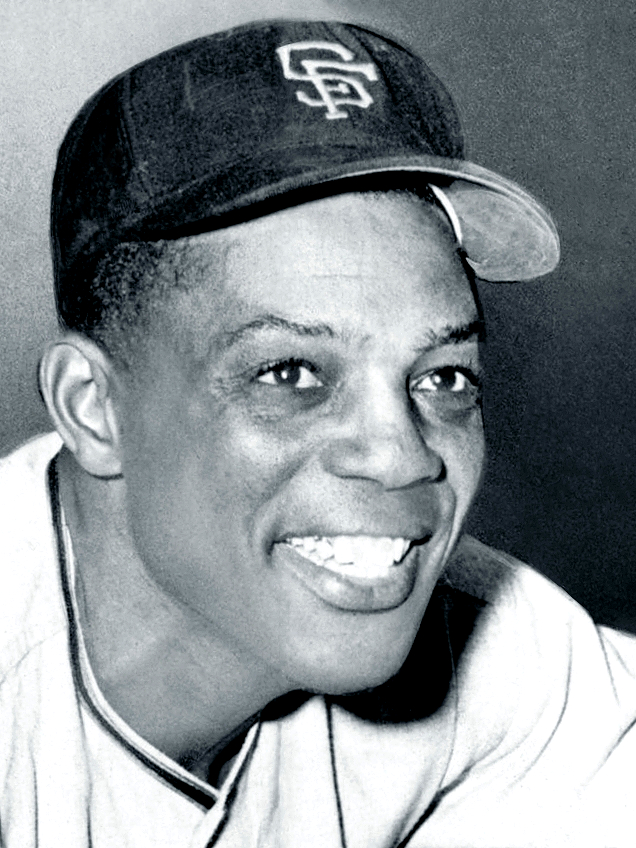
Willie Mays was the first player to win more than one All-Star Game MVP Award (1963, 1968).

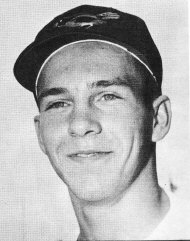
Brooks Robinson (AL) won the award in 1966, the first of only two times a player from the losing team has won the award.

Year	Player	Team	League	Position
1962 (Note: Two All-Star games were played in 1962.)	Maury Wills	Los Angeles Dodgers	National	Shortstop
1962	Leon Wagner	Los Angeles Angels	American	Left fielder
1963	Willie Mays^{†}	San Francisco Giants	National	Center fielder
1964	Johnny Callison	Philadelphia Phillies	National	Right fielder
1965	Juan Marichal^{†}	San Francisco Giants	National	Pitcher
1966	Brooks Robinson^{†}	Baltimore Orioles	American^{§}	Third baseman
1967	Tony Pérez^{†}	Cincinnati Reds	National	Third baseman
1968	Willie Mays^{†} (2)	San Francisco Giants	National	Center fielder
1969	Willie McCovey^{†}	San Francisco Giants	National	First baseman
1970	Carl Yastrzemski^{†}	Boston Red Sox	American^{§}	Center fielder/First baseman
1971	Frank Robinson^{†}	Baltimore Orioles	American	Right fielder
1972	Joe Morgan^{†}	Cincinnati Reds	National	Second baseman
1973	Bobby Bonds	San Francisco Giants	National	Right fielder
1974	Steve Garvey	Los Angeles Dodgers	National	First baseman
1975^{*} (Note: The 1975 award was shared by two players.)	Bill Madlock	Chicago Cubs	National	Third baseman
1975^{*}	Jon Matlack	New York Mets	National	Pitcher
1976	George Foster	Cincinnati Reds	National	Left fielder
1977	Don Sutton^{†}	Los Angeles Dodgers	National	Pitcher
1978	Steve Garvey (2)	Los Angeles Dodgers	National	First baseman
1979	Dave Parker^{†}	Pittsburgh Pirates	National	Right fielder
1980	Ken Griffey, Sr.	Cincinnati Reds	National	Right fielder
1981	Gary Carter^{†}	Montreal Expos	National	Catcher
1982	Dave Concepción	Cincinnati Reds	National	Shortstop
1983	Fred Lynn	California Angels	American	Center fielder
1984	Gary Carter^{†} (2)	Montreal Expos	National	Catcher
1985	LaMarr Hoyt	San Diego Padres	National	Pitcher
1986	Roger Clemens	Boston Red Sox	American	Pitcher
1987	Tim Raines^{†}	Montreal Expos	National	Left fielder
1988	Terry Steinbach	Oakland Athletics	American	Catcher
1989	Bo Jackson	Kansas City Royals	American	Left fielder
1990	Julio Franco	Texas Rangers	American	Second baseman
1991	Cal Ripken Jr.^{†}	Baltimore Orioles	American	Shortstop
1992	Ken Griffey Jr.^{†}	Seattle Mariners	American	Center fielder
1993	Kirby Puckett^{†}	Minnesota Twins	American	Center fielder
1994	Fred McGriff^{†}	Atlanta Braves	National	First baseman
1995	Jeff Conine	Florida Marlins	National	Left fielder
1996	Mike Piazza^{†}	Los Angeles Dodgers	National	Catcher
1997	Sandy Alomar Jr.	Cleveland Indians	American	Catcher
1998	Roberto Alomar^{†}	Baltimore Orioles	American	Second baseman
1999	Pedro Martínez^{†}	Boston Red Sox	American	Pitcher
2000	Derek Jeter^{†}	New York Yankees	American	Shortstop
2001	Cal Ripken Jr.^{†} (2)	Baltimore Orioles	American	Shortstop/Third baseman (Note: Ripken was elected as an American League All-Star at third base in 2001 but had spent the vast majority of his career at shortstop. Ripken had announced earlier that year that he would retire and Alex Rodriguez, the American League's starting shortstop, switched fielding positions with Ripken in the first inning as homage.)
2002 (Note: A winner was not chosen in 2002 when the game ended in a tie. Fox broadcasters Joe Buck and Tim McCarver stated that if the National League won, Damian Miller would be named MVP, and if the American League won, Paul Konerko would be named.)	No winner chosen			
2003	Garret Anderson	Anaheim Angels	American	Left fielder
2004	Alfonso Soriano	Texas Rangers	American	Second baseman
2005	Miguel Tejada	Baltimore Orioles	American	Shortstop
2006	Michael Young	Texas Rangers	American	Shortstop
2007	Ichiro Suzuki^{†}	Seattle Mariners	American	Center fielder
2008	J. D. Drew	Boston Red Sox	American	Right fielder
2009	Carl Crawford	Tampa Bay Rays	American	Left fielder
2010	Brian McCann	Atlanta Braves	National	Catcher
2011	Prince Fielder	Milwaukee Brewers	National	First baseman
2012	Melky Cabrera	San Francisco Giants	National	Center fielder
2013	Mariano Rivera^{†}	New York Yankees	American	Pitcher
2014	Mike Trout^{^}	Los Angeles Angels of Anaheim	American	Outfielder
2015	Mike Trout^{^} (2)	Los Angeles Angels of Anaheim	American	Outfielder
2016	Eric Hosmer	Kansas City Royals	American	First baseman
2017	Robinson Canó	Seattle Mariners	American	Second baseman
2018	Alex Bregman^{^}	Houston Astros	American	Third baseman
2019	Shane Bieber^{^}	Cleveland Indians	American	Pitcher
2020 (Note: The award was not given out as the game was canceled due to the COVID-19 pandemic.)	Game cancelled due to COVID-19 pandemic.			
2021	Vladimir Guerrero Jr.^{^}	Toronto Blue Jays	American	First baseman
2022	Giancarlo Stanton^{^}	New York Yankees	American	Outfielder
2023	Elías Díaz^{^}	Colorado Rockies	National	Catcher
2024	Jarren Duran^{^}	Boston Red Sox	American	Outfielder
2025	Kyle Schwarber^{^}	Philadelphia Phillies	National	Designated Hitter
2026	Cody Bellinger^{^}	New York Yankees	American	Outfielder

== See also ==
- Baseball awards § United States
- World Series Most Valuable Player Award
