= 2020 Major League Baseball All-Star Game =

Cancelled 2020 American baseball competition

- Teams: American League; National League
- Date: July 14, 2020 (cancelled)
- Venue: Dodger Stadium (planned)
- City: Los Angeles, California (planned)
- Managers: Dusty Baker (HOU); Dave Martinez (WAS)

The 2020 Major League Baseball All-Star Game would have been the 91st Major League Baseball All-Star Game. It was planned to be hosted on July 14 by the Los Angeles Dodgers, which would have been the second All-Star Game held at Dodger Stadium, following the 1980 All-Star Game, and the fourth hosted by the Dodgers. On July 3, the game was canceled due to the delayed start of the 2020 season, which began on July 23 due to the government restrictions imposed during the COVID-19 pandemic. It was the first cancellation since 1945, when the All-Star Game that year was not held in compliance with wartime travel restrictions at the time. Dodger Stadium was awarded the 2022 All-Star Game in its place. Fox and ESPN Radio were the game's respective planned television and radio partners.

== Host selection ==
Bidding for the 2020 All-Star Game began in 2017. It was awarded on April 11, 2018, by MLB Commissioner Rob Manfred. It would have been the first time since 1980 that Dodger Stadium would serve as the game's host. The Hollywood-inspired logo for the game was unveiled on July 23, 2019, in a ceremony at Dodger Stadium, emceed by longtime Dodgers broadcaster Vin Scully.

== Planned league managers and changes ==
As the manager of the previous season's American League champion Houston Astros, A. J. Hinch was originally designated as the manager for the American League All-Star team. On January 13, MLB suspended Hinch for the entire 2020 season for his role in the Houston Astros sign stealing scandal. Astros owner Jim Crane subsequently fired Hinch after the announcement. On January 29, it was announced that Hinch's successor, Dusty Baker, would manage the American League instead.

Dave Martinez, manager of the 2019 National League champion Washington Nationals, was designated as the manager for the National League All-Star team.

== Unofficial starters ==
Despite the game being cancelled, MLB.com released the players it believed deserved to be recognized as the "Unofficial 2020 All-Stars". The players selected by MLB.com are as follows:

=== National League ===
Position	Player	Team
C	J. T. Realmuto	Phillies
1B	Freddie Freeman	Braves
2B	Donovan Solano	Giants
3B	Manny Machado	Padres
SS	Fernando Tatis Jr.	Padres
OF	Bryce Harper	Phillies
OF	Mike Yastrzemski	Giants
OF	Mookie Betts	Dodgers
DH	Jesse Winker	Reds
SP	Jacob deGrom	Mets
RP	Josh Hader	Brewers

=== American League ===
Position	Player	Team
C	Pedro Severino	Orioles
1B	Luke Voit	Yankees
2B	Brandon Lowe	Rays
3B	Anthony Rendon	Angels
SS	Tim Anderson	White Sox
OF	Aaron Judge	Yankees
OF	Mike Trout	Angels
OF	Kyle Lewis	Mariners
DH	Nelson Cruz	Twins
SP	Shane Bieber	Indians
RP	Liam Hendriks	Athletics

== See also ==
- List of Major League Baseball All-Star Games
- Major League Baseball All-Star Game Most Valuable Player Award
- All-Star Futures Game
- Home Run Derby
