= 1950 Major League Baseball All-Star Game =

1950 American baseball competition

	1	2	3	4	5	6	7	8	9	10	11	12	13	14	R	H	E
National League	0	2	0	0	0	0	0	0	1	0	0	0	0	1	4	10	0
American League	0	0	1	0	2	0	0	0	0	0	0	0	0	0	3	8	1
- Date: July 11, 1950
- Venue: Comiskey Park
- City: Chicago
- Managers: Burt Shotton (Brooklyn Dodgers); Casey Stengel (New York Yankees)
- Attendance: 46,127
- Ceremonial first pitch: Connie Mack
- Television: NBC
- TV announcers: Jack Brickhouse
- Radio: Mutual
- Radio announcers: Mel Allen and Jim Britt

The 1950 Major League Baseball All-Star Game was the 17th playing of the midsummer classic between the all-stars of the American League (AL) and National League (NL), the two leagues comprising Major League Baseball. The game was held on July 11, 1950, at Comiskey Park in Chicago the home of the Chicago White Sox of the American League. The game resulted in the National League defeating the American League 4–3 in 14 innings. It was the first All-Star game to go into extra innings.

== White Sox in the game ==
The White Sox hosted the All-Star Game for the second time, the first having been the inaugural edition of 1933, and were represented by pitcher Ray Scarborough, who did not appear in the game.

== Starting lineups ==
Players in italics have since been inducted into the National Baseball Hall of Fame.

=== National League ===
- Willie Jones, 3B
- Ralph Kiner, LF
- Stan Musial, 1B
- Jackie Robinson, 2B
- Enos Slaughter, CF
- Hank Sauer, RF
- Roy Campanella, C
- Marty Marion, SS
- Robin Roberts, P

=== American League ===
- Phil Rizzuto, SS
- Larry Doby, CF
- George Kell, 3B
- Ted Williams, LF
- Walt Dropo, 1B
- Hoot Evers, RF
- Yogi Berra, C
- Bobby Doerr, 2B
- Vic Raschi, P

=== Umpires ===
Position	Umpire	League
Home plate	Bill McGowan	American
First base	Babe Pinelli	National
Second base	Eddie Rommel	American
Third base	Jocko Conlan	National
Left field	Johnny Stevens	American
Right field	Scotty Robb	National

The umpires changed assignments in the middle of the fifth inning – Pinelli to home, Rommel to first, Conlan to second, and McGowan to third.

== Synopsis ==
Tuesday, July 11, 1950 1:30 pm (CT) at Comiskey Park in Chicago, Illinois
Team	1	2	3	4	5	6	7	8	9	10	11	12	13	14	R	H	E
National League	0	2	0	0	0	0	0	0	1	0	0	0	0	1	4	10	0
American League	0	0	1	0	2	0	0	0	0	0	0	0	0	0	3	8	1
WP: Ewell Blackwell (1–0) LP: Ted Gray (0–1); Home runs: NL: Ralph Kiner (1), Red Schoendienst (1); AL: None

Vic Raschi and Robin Roberts were the starting pitchers for the AL and NL, respectively.

The NL scored first in the top of the 2nd inning, pushing across 2 runs on a single by Jackie Robinson followed by a triple by Enos Slaughter, who then scored on a flyout by Hank Sauer. The AL got 1 run back in the bottom of the 3rd inning, when Cass Michaels scored from third base on a flyout by George Kell. The AL then pulled ahead 3–2 in the bottom of the 5th inning; with runners on second and third with one out, Bob Lemon scored from third base on a flyout by George Kell, and Larry Doby then scored on a single by Ted Williams.

There was no further scoring until the top of the 9th inning, when the NL's Ralph Kiner hit a home run off of AL reliever Art Houtteman, tying the score 3–3. The NL benefitted from five innings of scoreless relief from Larry Jansen, who faced 16 batters striking out 6, while allowing just one hit.

In the top of the 14th, the NL's Red Schoendienst hit a home run off of AL reliever Ted Gray to put the NL ahead 4–3. In the bottom of the 14th, the AL's Joe DiMaggio came to bat with one out and a man on first, but with the crowd on its feet, DiMaggio grounded into a game-ending 5-4-3 double play.

The losing pitcher was the AL's Ted Gray. The winning pitcher was the NL's Ewell Blackwell, who shutout the AL in the final three innings, while facing nine batters and giving up just a single.
