= 2008 Major League Baseball All-Star Game =

2008 American baseball competition

	1	2	3	4	5	6	7	8	9	10	11	12	13	14	15	R	H	E
National League	0	0	0	0	1	1	0	1	0	0	0	0	0	0	0	3	13	4
American League	0	0	0	0	0	0	2	1	0	0	0	0	0	0	1	4	14	1
- Date: July 15–16, 2008
- Venue: Yankee Stadium
- City: The Bronx, New York City
- Managers: Clint Hurdle (COL); Terry Francona (BOS)
- MVP: J. D. Drew (BOS)
- Attendance: 55,632
- Ceremonial first pitch: Yogi Berra, Whitey Ford, Goose Gossage and Reggie Jackson
- Television: Fox (United States); MLB International (International)
- TV announcers: Joe Buck and Tim McCarver (Fox); Gary Thorne and Rick Sutcliffe (MLB International)
- Radio: ESPN
- Radio announcers: Dan Shulman and Dave Campbell

The 2008 Major League Baseball All-Star Game was the 79th midseason exhibition between the all-stars of the American League (AL) and the National League (NL), the two leagues comprising Major League Baseball. The game was played at Yankee Stadium in The Bronx, New York City, home of the New York Yankees, on July 15, 2008, and began at 8:47 p.m. ET. The game ended at 1:38 a.m. ET the following morning. The home American League won 4–3 in 15 innings, giving home field advantage in the 2008 World Series to the AL champion, which eventually came to be the Tampa Bay Rays.

By length of time, this was the longest MLB All-Star Game in history (4 hours and 50 minutes), and it also tied the mark for the longest game by innings played at 15 with the 1967 All-Star Game. Second baseman Dan Uggla of the Florida Marlins committed three errors, an All-Star Game record, none of which resulted in a run. J. D. Drew of the Boston Red Sox was named Most Valuable Player due to his two-run game-tying home run in the seventh inning. Drew won a Chevrolet Tahoe hybrid and the Ted Williams Trophy. It was the second All-Star Game in which the winning run was batted in by the Texas Rangers' Michael Young.

This was the fourth and final time that the All-Star Game was held at the original Yankee Stadium, which tied it with Cleveland Stadium for the most All-Star Games hosted by one venue.

== Background ==
As with each All-Star Game since 1970, the eight starting position players of each league, as well as the American League's designated hitter, were elected by fan balloting. The remaining players were selected by a players' vote, each league's team manager, and a second fan balloting to add one more player to each roster. In all, 32 players were selected to each league's team, not including players who decline to play due to injuries or personal reasons.

The game was the sixth straight All-Star Game to decide home-field advantage in the World Series, the AL having clinched each of the first five opportunities. The AL entered the game on an 11-game unbeaten streak (10–0–1) as the NL continued to look for their first win since the 1996 game in Philadelphia, still holding a 40–37–2 lead in the series.

=== Venue selection ===
The announcement of Yankee Stadium as the site of the game was made by MLB Commissioner Bud Selig and New York City Mayor Michael Bloomberg on January 31, 2007, at New York's City Hall. Though it was the fourth game hosted at the Stadium and the eighth held in New York City, it was the first time since 1977 that the game had been played in the city (the last time also at Yankee Stadium). It had been speculated for months that the game would be held in Yankee Stadium, accelerated by the announcement that the 2008 season would be the 84th and final one for the stadium before the team moved into the new Yankee Stadium in 2009. Thus, it was seen as a fitting tribute to the old stadium that it host an All-Star Game in its final season.

It was the first All-Star Game to be played in a venue scheduled to close after that season.

=== Related events ===
- The DHL FanFest, an indoor amusement park and quasi-museum, took place over five days beginning on July 11 at the Jacob K. Javits Convention Center on Manhattan's West Side.
- The XM All-Star Futures Game and the Taco Bell All-Star Legends and Celebrity Softball Game were played on July 13 at Yankee Stadium.
- The Gatorade Workout Day and State Farm Home Run Derby was held July 14 at the stadium.
- 42 replicas of the Statue of Liberty (officially 43 when including the replica found at the Jacob K. Javits Convention Center) were put on display beginning on June 20 at various sites throughout the city. They depicted every MLB team, the game logo, the league logo, and even the Brooklyn Dodgers and New York Giants.

== Fan balloting ==
=== Starters ===
Balloting for the 2008 All-Star Game starters (excluding pitchers) began on April 29. Because the game was in an American League ballpark, fans were asked to select their favorite AL designated hitter in addition to all the position players. The top vote-getters at each position, and top three among outfielders, were named to start the game.

Votes were cast online and at the 30 MLB ballparks. Monster was the sponsor of the online portion of balloting. There was a limit of 25 votes per e-mail address, but no limit to the number of ballots cast at the stadium. The deadline to cast votes was July 2. Rosters were announced on July 6. Alex Rodriguez led all players in votes for the second consecutive year with 3,934,518 votes, while Chase Utley led all National League players with 3,889,602 votes.

=== Final roster spot ===
After the rosters were revealed, a second ballot of five players per league was created for the Monster All-Star Final Vote to determine the 32nd and final player of each roster. Ballots were cast online between July 6 and 10 with the player in each league receiving the most votes added to the team rosters. The winners were Corey Hart of the Milwaukee Brewers and Evan Longoria of the Tampa Bay Rays. A record 47.8 million votes were cast in the balloting, shattering the record set the previous year of 23.2 million. Longoria's nine million votes more than doubled the individual record of 4.4 million set by San Diego Padres pitcher Chris Young in 2007.

Player	Team	Pos.	Experience (All Star/ Seasons)	Player	Team	Pos.	Experience (All Star/ Seasons)
National League				American League			
Corey Hart	MIL	OF	(0/5)	Evan Longoria	TB	3B	(0/1)
David Wright	NYM	3B	(2/5)	Jermaine Dye	CWS	OF	(2/13)
Pat Burrell	PHI	OF	(0/9)	Jason Giambi	NYY	1B	(5/14)
Aaron Rowand	SF	OF	(1/8)	Brian Roberts	BAL	2B	(2/8)
Carlos Lee	HOU	OF	(3/10)	José Guillén	KC	OF	(0/12)

== Rosters ==
Players in italics have since been inducted into the National Baseball Hall of Fame.

=== National League ===
Elected starters
Position	Player	Team	All-Star Games
C	Geovany Soto	Cubs	1
1B	Lance Berkman	Astros	5
2B	Chase Utley	Phillies	3
3B	Chipper Jones	Braves	6
SS	Hanley Ramírez	Marlins	1
OF	Ryan Braun	Brewers	1
OF	Kosuke Fukudome	Cubs	1
OF	Alfonso Soriano^{b}	Cubs	7
DH	Albert Pujols	Cardinals	7

Pitchers
Position	Player	Team	All-Star Games
P	Aaron Cook	Rockies	1
P	Ryan Dempster	Cubs	2
P	Dan Haren	Diamondbacks	2
P	Brad Lidge	Phillies	2
P	Tim Lincecum^{e}	Giants	1
P	Carlos Mármol	Cubs	1
P	Ben Sheets	Brewers	4
P	Edinson Vólquez	Reds	1
P	Billy Wagner	Mets	6
P	Brandon Webb	Diamondbacks	3
P	Brian Wilson	Giants	1
P	Kerry Wood^{d}	Cubs	2
P	Carlos Zambrano	Cubs	3

Reserves
Position	Player	Team	All-Star Games
C	Russell Martin	Dodgers	2
C	Brian McCann	Braves	3
1B	Adrián González	Padres	1
2B	Dan Uggla	Marlins	2
3B	Aramis Ramírez	Cubs	2
3B	David Wright	Mets	3
SS	Cristian Guzmán	Nationals	2
SS	Miguel Tejada	Astros	5
OF	Corey Hart^{c}	Brewers	1
OF	Matt Holliday	Rockies	3
OF	Ryan Ludwick	Cardinals	1
OF	Nate McLouth	Pirates	1

=== American League ===
Elected starters
Positioning	Player	Team	All-Star Games
C	Joe Mauer	Twins	2
1B	Kevin Youkilis	Red Sox	1
2B	Dustin Pedroia	Red Sox	1
3B	Alex Rodriguez	Yankees	12
SS	Derek Jeter	Yankees	9
OF	Josh Hamilton	Rangers	1
OF	Manny Ramirez	Red Sox	12
OF	Ichiro Suzuki	Mariners	8
DH	David Ortiz^{a}	Red Sox	5

Pitchers
Position	Player	Team	All-Star Games
P	Justin Duchscherer	Athletics	2
P	Roy Halladay	Blue Jays	5
P	Scott Kazmir	Rays	2
P	Cliff Lee	Indians	1
P	Joe Nathan	Twins	3
P	Jonathan Papelbon	Red Sox	3
P	Mariano Rivera	Yankees	9
P	Francisco Rodríguez	Angels	3
P	Ervin Santana	Angels	1
P	Joe Saunders	Angels	1
P	George Sherrill	Orioles	1
P	Joakim Soria	Royals	1

Reserves
Position	Player	Team	All-Star Games
C	Dioner Navarro	Rays	1
C	Jason Varitek	Red Sox	3
1B	Justin Morneau	Twins	2
2B	Ian Kinsler	Rangers	1
3B	Joe Crede	White Sox	1
3B	Carlos Guillén	Tigers	3
3B	Evan Longoria^{c}	Rays	1
SS	Michael Young	Rangers	5
OF	J. D. Drew	Red Sox	1
OF	Carlos Quentin	White Sox	1
OF	Grady Sizemore	Indians	3
DH	Milton Bradley	Rangers	1

^aSelected to start but unable to play due to injury. Milton Bradley took his place in the starting lineup.
^bSelected to start but unable to play due to injury. Matt Holliday took his place in the starting lineup. David Wright took his place on the roster.
^cWon the Monster All-Star Final Vote.
^dUnable to play due to injury. Carlos Mármol took his place on the roster.
^eLincecum was not available to the National League due to flu-like symptoms he suffered earlier in the day.

== Game ==
=== Ceremonies ===
To commemorate the last all-star game at Yankee Stadium, every living member of the Baseball Hall of Fame was invited to the game. Forty-nine players, coaches, and administrators accepted the invitation. Many of them participated in a pre-game parade that went up Sixth Avenue from Bryant Park to Central Park. During the pre-game ceremonies, the Hall of Famers were introduced and assumed their playing position on the field. Instead of announcing the league lineups separately and in batting order, as is usually done, both teams' starters were introduced simultaneously by position, and the players stood in position next to the Hall of Fame members on the field.

The colors were presented by the West Point Cadet Color Guard. A recording of O Canada was played, and "The Star-Spangled Banner" was sung by Sheryl Crow, during which a B-2 stealth bomber flew over. Four Yankees, all members of the Baseball Hall of Fame – Yogi Berra, Whitey Ford, Reggie Jackson and Rich Gossage – threw the ceremonial first pitch, with balls delivered to them by Yankees owner George Steinbrenner.

During the seventh-inning stretch, Josh Groban sang "God Bless America".

=== Umpires ===
The six umpires working the 79th All-Star game were announced on June 25. The crew was led by Derryl Cousins, a thirty-year MLB veteran working his third All-Star game and his first behind the plate.

Position	Umpire
Home Plate	Derryl Cousins
First Base	Ed Rapuano
Second Base	Tom Hallion
Third Base	Mark Wegner
Left Field	Greg Gibson
Right Field	Phil Cuzzi

=== Starting lineups ===
National League				American League			
Order	Player	Team	Position	Order	Player	Team	Position
1	Hanley Ramírez	Marlins	SS	1	Ichiro Suzuki	Mariners	RF
2	Chase Utley	Phillies	2B	2	Derek Jeter	Yankees	SS
3	Lance Berkman	Astros	1B	3	Josh Hamilton	Rangers	CF
4	Albert Pujols	Cardinals	DH	4	Alex Rodriguez	Yankees	3B
5	Chipper Jones	Braves	3B	5	Manny Ramírez	Red Sox	LF
6	Matt Holliday	Rockies	RF	6	Milton Bradley	Rangers	DH
7	Ryan Braun	Brewers	LF	7	Kevin Youkilis	Red Sox	1B
8	Kosuke Fukudome	Cubs	CF	8	Joe Mauer	Twins	C
9	Geovany Soto	Cubs	C	9	Dustin Pedroia	Red Sox	2B
	Ben Sheets	Brewers	P		Cliff Lee	Indians	P

=== Coaches ===
Tigers manager Jim Leyland and Yankees manager Joe Girardi were selected as coaches by manager Terry Francona. The staff also included Brad Mills (bench coach), John Farrell (pitching coach), Dave Magadan (hitting coach), Luis Alicea (first base coach), DeMarlo Hale, (third base coach), and Gary Tuck (bullpen coach). Girardi also caught in the bullpen in the eighth and ninth innings for some of the American League relievers.

New York Mets manager Willie Randolph and San Diego Padres manager Bud Black were selected as coaches by manager Clint Hurdle. Randolph was later replaced by Chicago Cubs manager Lou Piniella after Randolph was fired by the Mets on June 16.

=== Game summary ===
Tuesday, July 15, 2008 8:47 pm (EDT) at Yankee Stadium in Bronx, New York
Team	1	2	3	4	5	6	7	8	9	10	11	12	13	14	15	R	H	E
National League	0	0	0	0	1	1	0	1	0	0	0	0	0	0	0	3	13	4
American League	0	0	0	0	0	0	2	1	0	0	0	0	0	0	1	4	14	1
Starting pitchers: NL: Ben Sheets; AL: Cliff Lee; WP: Scott Kazmir (1-0) LP: Brad Lidge (0-1); Home runs: NL: Matt Holliday (1); AL: J. D. Drew (1)

The game-time temperature was 82 °F (28 °C), with the wind blowing out to center field at eight miles per hour. Cliff Lee threw the first pitch at 8:47 EDT. Starting pitchers Lee and Ben Sheets set the tone for the game by each throwing two scoreless innings. The game stayed scoreless until the fifth inning when Matt Holliday led off the inning with a home run off Ervin Santana to give the National League a 1–0 lead. The NL added a run in the sixth on a sacrifice fly by Lance Berkman to score Hanley Ramírez. The American League finally got on the board in the bottom of the seventh inning on a two-out, two-run home run by J. D. Drew off Edinson Vólquez, tying the game at two.

In the eighth inning, Miguel Tejada singled, and with one out attempted to steal second base. Catcher Dioner Navarro made a poor throw to get Tejada, and the ball ended up in center field, allowing Tejada to advance to third base on the error. Tejada scored on a sacrifice fly by Adrián González, and the NL retook the lead. In the bottom half of the inning, after Brian Wilson retired the first two batters, Billy Wagner gave up a single to Grady Sizemore. Sizemore proceeded to steal second base (one of a record six stolen bases by both sides), and pinch-hitter Evan Longoria hit a ground rule double to left field to tie the game once again. With Mariano Rivera in to pitch with one out in the ninth inning for the American League, Rivera struck out Ryan Ludwick and Navarro threw out Cristian Guzmán as he attempted to steal second, thus ending the inning. Ryan Dempster struck out the side in the bottom of the ninth to force the game into extra innings.

In the tenth inning for the American League, Michael Young and Carlos Quentin reached base on consecutive errors by Dan Uggla. Carlos Guillén was intentionally walked to load the bases with none out. With the infield and outfield drawn in, NL pitcher Aaron Cook induced ground balls from Sizemore and Longoria and the potential winning runs in both at bats were forced out at home. Cook successfully escaped the jam by getting Justin Morneau to ground out to Tejada to end the inning. The AL had another chance to win in the eleventh when Young singled with one out in the eleventh and Drew and Navarro on first and second. Navarro tried scoring from second on the hit, but was thrown out at home by Nate McLouth. Cook got Quentin to ground out to third and keep the game going.

The NL then had their chance to score in the twelfth off Joakim Soria, with the bases loaded and one out. Soria struck out Dan Uggla, and was relieved by George Sherrill, who struck out Adrián González to end the threat. In the bottom of the inning, Carlos Guillén hit a long fly ball that bounced off the left field wall for a double. After advancing to third base after a Grady Sizemore groundout, Cook, pitching his third inning of relief, struck out Longoria. Morneau was intentionally walked, and advanced to second base on defensive indifference. Cook got Ian Kinsler to ground out to end the inning.

Sherrill pitched scoreless innings in the 13th and 14th, while Carlos Mármol and Brandon Webb did the same for the NL, and the game moved into the 15th inning, tying the record set in 1967 for the longest All-Star Game in terms of innings played. At this point, each team was down to their final pitchers, raising concerns of the game finishing in a tie due to lack of pitchers. In the bottom of the 15th, Morneau led off with a single off Brad Lidge. A diving play by Ludwick robbed Kinsler of a base hit for the first out. Navarro then singled to move Morneau to second base, and Drew walked to once again load the bases. This time, the AL would capitalize; Michael Young flew out to right field, and Morneau was able to tag and just beat the throw from Corey Hart to score the winning run for a final score of 4–3. The American League's unbeaten streak in the All-Star Game was extended to 12 in a row. Young was credited a walk-off sacrifice fly.

=== All-Star Game records set or tied ===
- The longest game based on time (4:50) in MLB All-Star Game history.
- Tied for the longest game in terms of number of innings (15) with the 1967 All-Star Game at Angels Stadium (formerly Anaheim Stadium).
- Most combined strikeouts (34), stolen bases (7), runners left on base (28), pitchers (23) and players (63) in a Mid-Summer Classic.
- Dan Uggla of the Florida Marlins set an All-Star Game record by committing the most errors (3). He is the first MLB player ever to have 3 strikeouts, 3 errors, and ground into a double play in a single game. This includes any regular season, postseason, and All-Star Games.

== Home Run Derby ==
The State Farm Home Run Derby took place on July 14. Josh Hamilton set a Home Run Derby record for most home runs in one round with 28. Justin Morneau won the derby.

Yankee Stadium, New York—A.L. 66, N.L. 39
Player	Team	Round 1	Round 2	Subtotal	Finals	Total
Justin Morneau	Minnesota	8	9	17	5	22
Josh Hamilton	Texas	28^{a}	4^{b}	32	3	35
Lance Berkman	Houston	8	6	14	–	14
Ryan Braun	Milwaukee	7	7	14	–	14
Dan Uggla	Florida	6	–	6	–	6
Grady Sizemore	Cleveland	6	–	6	–	6
Chase Utley	Philadelphia	5	–	5	–	5
Evan Longoria	Tampa Bay	3	–	3	–	3

Notes:
^aNew single round record.
^bVoluntarily ended round with four outs
10 Home Runs were hit while the Gold Ball (special balls used when the batters have nine outs) was in play, earning $170,000 for the Boys & Girls Clubs of America.

== Broadcasters ==
The All-Star Game was shown live in the United States on Fox Sports, with Joe Buck and Tim McCarver in the booth and sportswriter Ken Rosenthal as a field reporter. Yogi Berra visited the booth in the third inning.

For telecasts in other countries, the game was produced by Major League Baseball Properties under the name MLB International, with Gary Thorne and Rick Sutcliffe as the English-language announcers. In the U.S., the feed was simulcast by Fox Sports en Español with Spanish-language commentary.

The British rights-holder for this game, five (now known as Channel 5) ended its coverage at 6 a.m. BST with the game still in the 12th inning. The network explained that it had a commitment to carry the children's cartoon show The Wiggles that it could not break. The situation is similar to the infamous Heidi Game on the U.S. network NBC in 1968.

The radio rights in the U.S. were held by ESPN Radio; the announcers were Dan Shulman and Dave Campbell.
