= Clayton Kershaw =

American baseball player (born 1988)

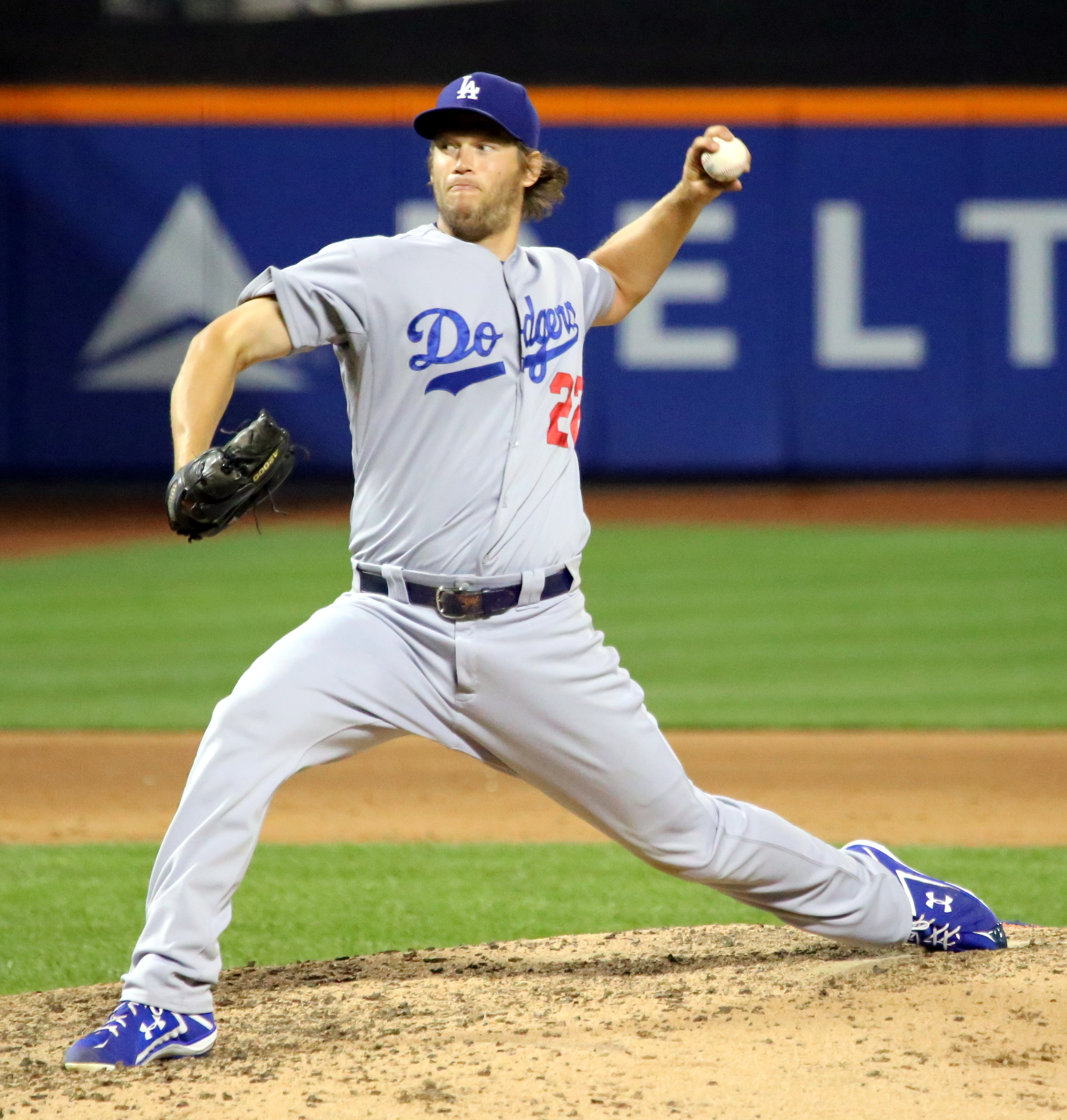
- Kershaw with the Los Angeles Dodgers in 2015
- Pitcher
- Born: March 19, 1988 (age 38); Dallas, Texas, U.S.
- Batted: Left Threw: Left

MLB debut
- May 25, 2008, for the Los Angeles Dodgers

Last MLB appearance
- September 28, 2025, for the Los Angeles Dodgers

MLB statistics
- Win–loss record: 223–96
- Earned run average: 2.53
- Strikeouts: 3,052
- Stats at Baseball Reference

Teams
- Los Angeles Dodgers (2008–2025)

Career highlights and awards
- 11× All-Star (2011–2017, 2019, 2022, 2023, 2025); 3× World Series champion (2020, 2024, (Note: Kershaw was injured and did not participate in the postseason.) 2025); NL MVP (2014); 3× NL Cy Young Award (2011, 2013, 2014); Triple Crown (2011); Gold Glove Award (2011); Roberto Clemente Award (2012); 3× NL wins leader (2011, 2014, 2017); 5× NL ERA leader (2011–2014, 2017); 3× NL strikeout leader (2011, 2013, 2015); Pitched a no-hitter on June 18, 2014
Medals
Men's baseball
Representing United States
World Baseball Classic
Silver medal – second place	2026 Miami	Team

Clayton Edward Kershaw (born March 19, 1988) is an American former professional baseball pitcher who played 18 seasons for the Los Angeles Dodgers of Major League Baseball (MLB). A left-handed starting pitcher, Kershaw was an 11-time National League (NL) All-Star, three-time Cy Young Award winner, and 2014 NL Most Valuable Player. He is one of 20 pitchers and four left-handers to be members of the 3,000 strikeout club. He is widely regarded as one of the greatest pitchers in baseball history.

Kershaw was drafted by the Dodgers with the seventh overall pick in the first round of the 2006 MLB draft. He worked his way through the Dodgers' farm system and reached the major league level at age 20 after one season. In 2011, he won the pitching Triple Crown and the NL Cy Young Award, becoming the youngest pitcher to accomplish either of these feats since Dwight Gooden in 1985. Kershaw pitched a no-hitter on June 18, 2014. He was on the roster of the 2020 and 2025 World Series-winning teams and received a ring from the 2024 team, missing the postseason due to injuries.

Kershaw was the first pitcher to lead MLB in earned run average (ERA) in four consecutive years (2011–2014) and also led the NL in a fifth. He was also a three-time NL wins leader and strikeouts leader. His 2.53 career ERA is the lowest among starting pitchers with at least 60 starts in the live-ball era. Kershaw was less effective in the postseason than in the regular season, with a 4.62 earned run average in 196 2/3 postseason innings pitched. He retired from MLB after the 2025 season.

Off the field, Kershaw participates in volunteer work. He and his wife Ellen launched "Kershaw's Challenge" and wrote the book Arise: Live Out Your Faith and Dreams on Whatever Field You Find Yourself to raise money to build an orphanage in Zambia. He received the Roberto Clemente Award and Branch Rickey Award for his humanitarian work.

== Early life ==
Clayton Edward Kershaw was born on March 19, 1988, in Dallas, Texas. His parents divorced when he was 10, and he was raised by his mother. He played in youth sports leagues as a child, including Little League Baseball.

Kershaw attended nearby Highland Park High School, where he played baseball and was also the center for future NFL quarterback Matthew Stafford on the varsity football team. After a growth spurt and further development of his pitches, he established himself as an elite high school prospect in 2006 when he posted a 13–0 record with an earned run average (ERA) of 0.77, and recorded 139 strikeouts in 64 innings pitched. In a playoff game against Northwest High School of Justin, Texas, Kershaw pitched an all-strikeout perfect game; he struck out all 15 batters he faced in the game, which was shortened because of the mercy rule. He also hit a home run in the game. Kershaw was selected by USA Today as "High School Baseball Player of the Year", and was also the Gatorade National Player of the Year for baseball. He also pitched for the United States national under-18 team in the 2005 U-18 Pan American Championships.

== Professional baseball career ==
=== Draft and minor leagues (2006–2008) ===
Entering the 2006 MLB draft, Kershaw was considered the consensus top high school pitcher available. The Los Angeles Dodgers selected Kershaw with the seventh overall pick in the draft. He had committed to Texas A&M University but turned down the scholarship offer to sign with the Dodgers, with a bonus estimated at $2.3 million. At the time, it was the largest bonus conferred on any Dodgers draft pick and remained so until it was topped by the $5.25 million that Zach Lee, another Texas high school pitcher, earned from the 2010 draft.

Kershaw began his professional career with the Gulf Coast League (GCL) Dodgers. He pitched 37 innings in 2006, striking out 54 batters while walking only five and compiling a record of 2–0 with a 1.95 ERA. His fastball topped out at 96 miles per hour (154 km/h). Baseball America rated him as the top prospect in the GCL and the Dodgers' second best prospect behind third baseman Andy LaRoche.

Kershaw was promoted to the Great Lakes Loons in 2007, with whom he recorded a record of 7–5 with a 2.77 ERA. He was selected to play on the East Team in the Midwest League All-Star Game and on the USA team in the All-Star Futures Game. On August 6, he was promoted to the Double-A Jacksonville Suns in the Southern League, where he produced a 1–2 record and 3.65 ERA in five starts and was selected as the top prospect in the Dodgers organization heading into the 2008 season.

During spring training in a game against the Boston Red Sox, Kershaw gained much attention for throwing a curveball to Sean Casey that started behind Casey but at the end looped into the strike zone and struck him out looking. Kershaw was 0–3 and had a 2.28 ERA with 47 strikeouts through 43 1/3 innings pitched in his first stint of the year with the Suns. He was then called up to the majors on May 24, 2008, but optioned back to Jacksonville on July 2.

Kershaw pitched 18 innings during his second trip to Jacksonville (two starts and one seven-inning relief appearance), winning two games. During this stretch, he allowed only two earned runs, lowering his ERA to 1.91. He was recalled on July 22.

=== 2008 season: Rookie year ===
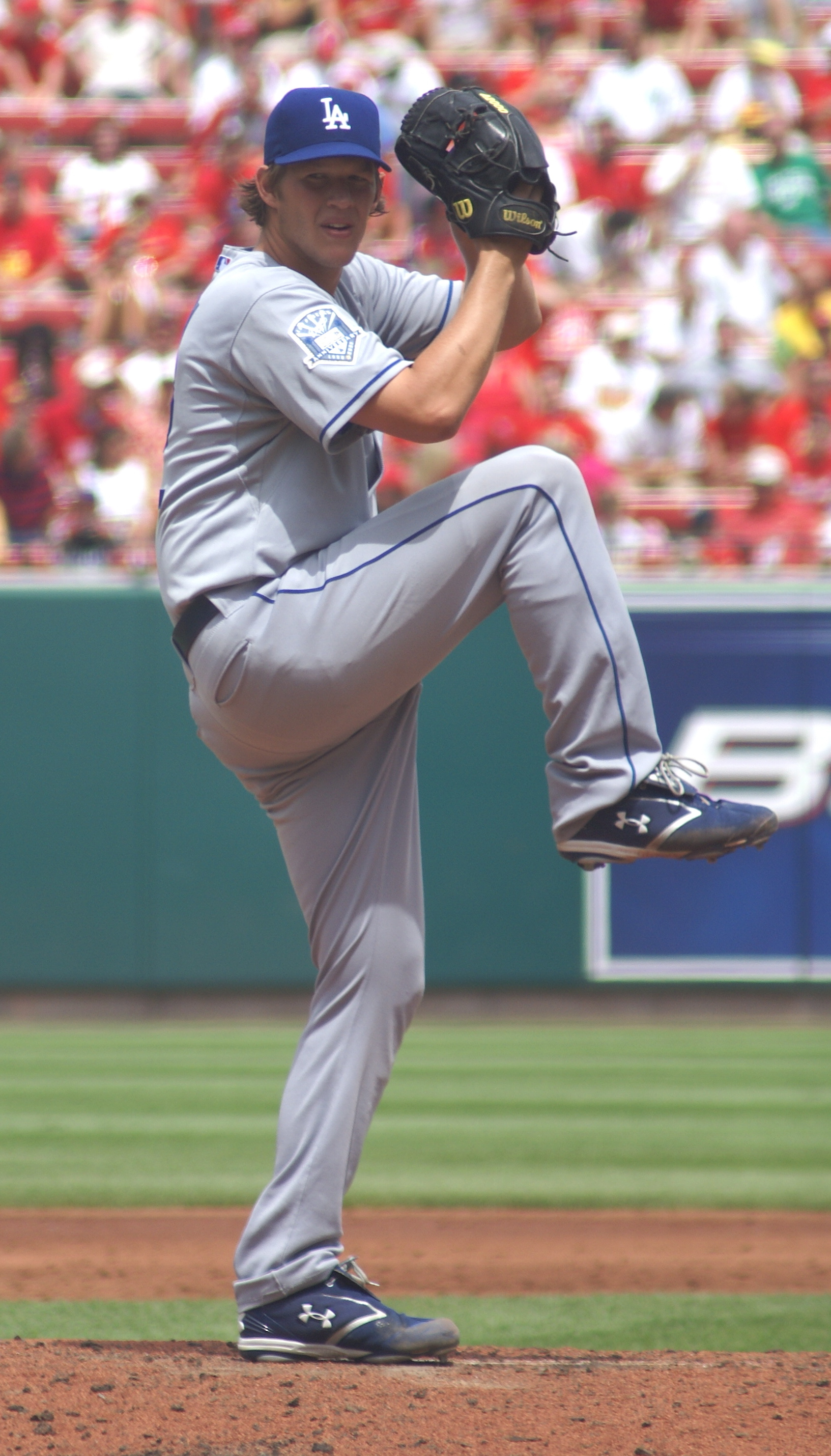
Kershaw during his 2008 rookie season

On May 24, 2008, the Dodgers bought Kershaw's minor-league contract, and he was added to the active roster. Sportswriter Tony Jackson called Kershaw's debut the most anticipated start by a Dodgers pitcher since Hideo Nomo's MLB debut in 1995. He made his MLB debut on May 25, starting against the St. Louis Cardinals. He struck out the first batter he faced, Skip Schumaker, the first of seven strikeouts in the game, in which he pitched six innings and allowed two runs. When he debuted, Kershaw was the youngest player in MLB (20 years, 67 days), a title he held until Fernando Martínez debuted in May 2009.

Kershaw won his first MLB game against the Washington Nationals on July 27. He pitched six-plus shutout innings, allowing four hits, a walk, and he struck out five. Kershaw finished his rookie season 5–5, with a 4.26 ERA in 22 games (21 starts). He also pitched two innings out of the bullpen for the Dodgers in the National League Championship Series (NLCS) against the Philadelphia Phillies.

=== 2009 season ===
On April 15, 2009, Kershaw pitched seven innings, striking out 13 batters while allowing only one hit (a solo home run) against the rival San Francisco Giants. On May 17, Kershaw did not allow a hit against the Florida Marlins through seven innings, then gave up a lead-off double to Florida's Cody Ross. In 2009, despite an 8–8 record, he led the major leagues in opposing batting average (.200), opposing slugging percentage (.282), and hits per nine innings (6.26). He also posted an ERA of 2.79 and 185 strikeouts. Kershaw also walked 91 batters, which was second most in the National League (NL).

Kershaw made his playoff starting debut against the St. Louis Cardinals in the National League Division Series (NLDS). He went 6 2/3 innings, striking out four, walking one, and ended up getting a no-decision (the Dodgers went on to win the game in the ninth inning). At 21 years old, he started the opener of the NLCS against the Philadelphia Phillies and was the third youngest pitcher to ever start a playoff series opener, behind only Fernando Valenzuela in the 1981 NLDS and Rick Ankiel in the 2000 NLDS.

=== 2010 season: First complete game shutout ===
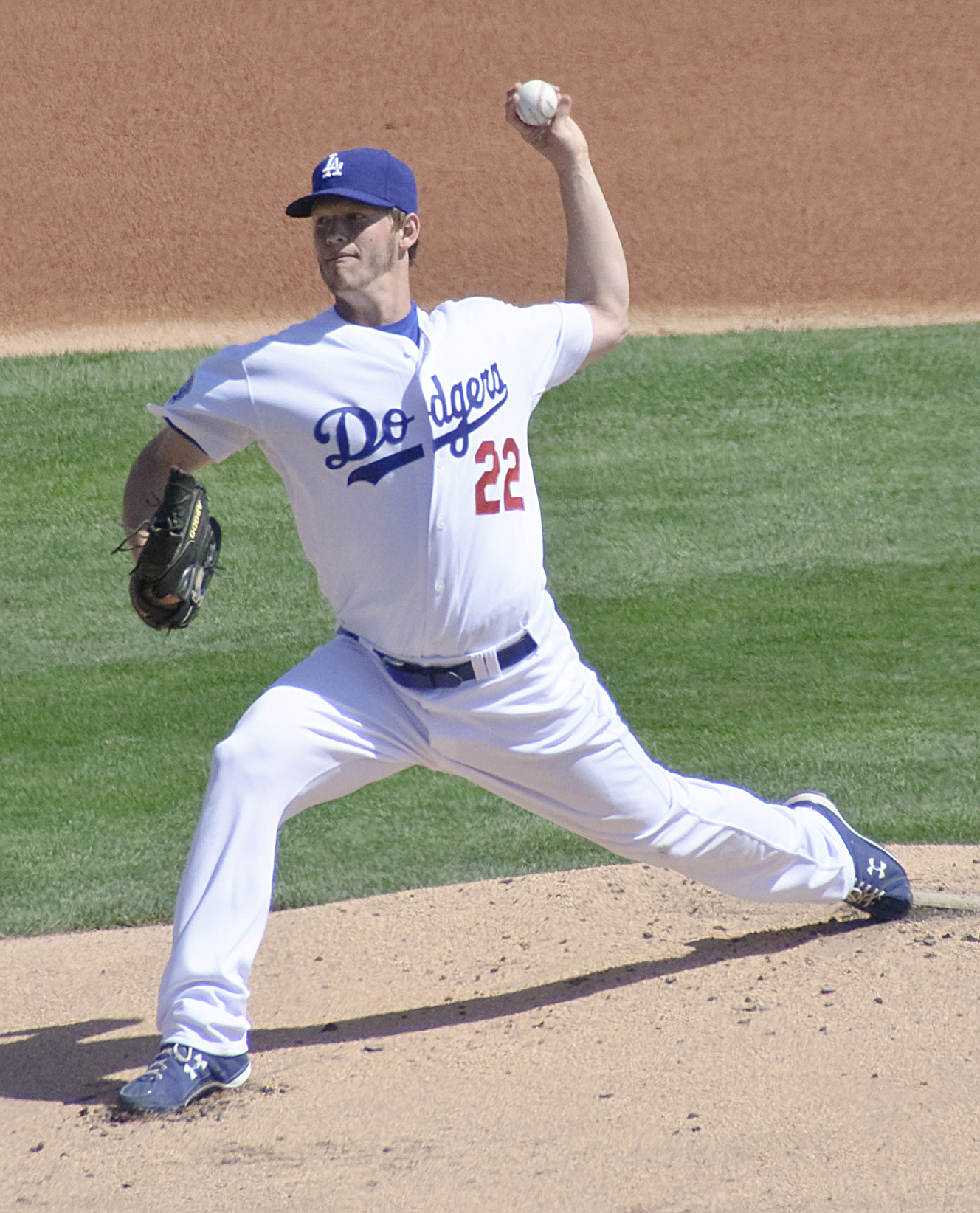
Kershaw pitching in 2010

Kershaw started the 2010 season by posting a 3.07 ERA in April but did so by walking 22 batters in 29 innings. On May 4, he had the worst start of his career against the Milwaukee Brewers at Dodger Stadium, throwing just 57 pitches in 1 1/3 innings while retiring only four of the 13 batters he faced—including the pitcher. He was booed loudly upon being pulled from the game. Kershaw said after the game, "I didn't give our team any kind of chance. It's just not a good feeling to let your teammates down, let everybody down. It stings, it hurts. I've got to figure things out."

Kershaw rebounded his next start by pitching an eight-inning two-hitter and outdueling the then-undefeated Ubaldo Jiménez. He credited his control of the slider being the major turning point for him. Later in the season, he was suspended for five games after hitting Aaron Rowand of the Giants with a pitch in a game on July 20. The incident occurred after both teams were given a warning following Giants ace Tim Lincecum hitting Matt Kemp earlier in the game. He threw his first career complete game shutout on September 14, also against San Francisco and finished the season with a record of 13–10 and a 2.91 ERA in 32 starts, pitching 204 1/3 innings and recording 212 strikeouts.

=== 2011 season: First Cy Young Award ===
After finishing the 2010 season strong, the Dodgers named Kershaw as the Opening Day Starter for the 2011 season. On May 29, he pitched the second complete-game shutout of his career, striking out 10 while winning a two-hitter against the Florida Marlins; he also had two singles and an RBI, scoring twice in the game. He produced his third career shutout on June 20, a two-hit, 11-strikeout effort against the Detroit Tigers.

In his next start, on June 26, Kershaw pitched another complete game (against the Los Angeles Angels of Anaheim). He became the first Dodger starter to have back-to-back complete-game victories since Jeff Weaver in the 2005 season and the first Dodger to have double-digit strikeouts in consecutive starts since Chan Ho Park in the 2000 season. He was awarded the National League Player of the Week award for the week of June 20–26 as a result of those two starts. Midway through June, Kershaw had amassed 32 career victories, a 3.15 ERA and 593 career strikeouts in 568 2/3 innings. According to the Elias Sports Bureau, Kershaw was the first 23-year-old pitcher to have that many victories, an ERA that low, and an average of more than one strikeout per inning since ERA became an official statistic in 1910.

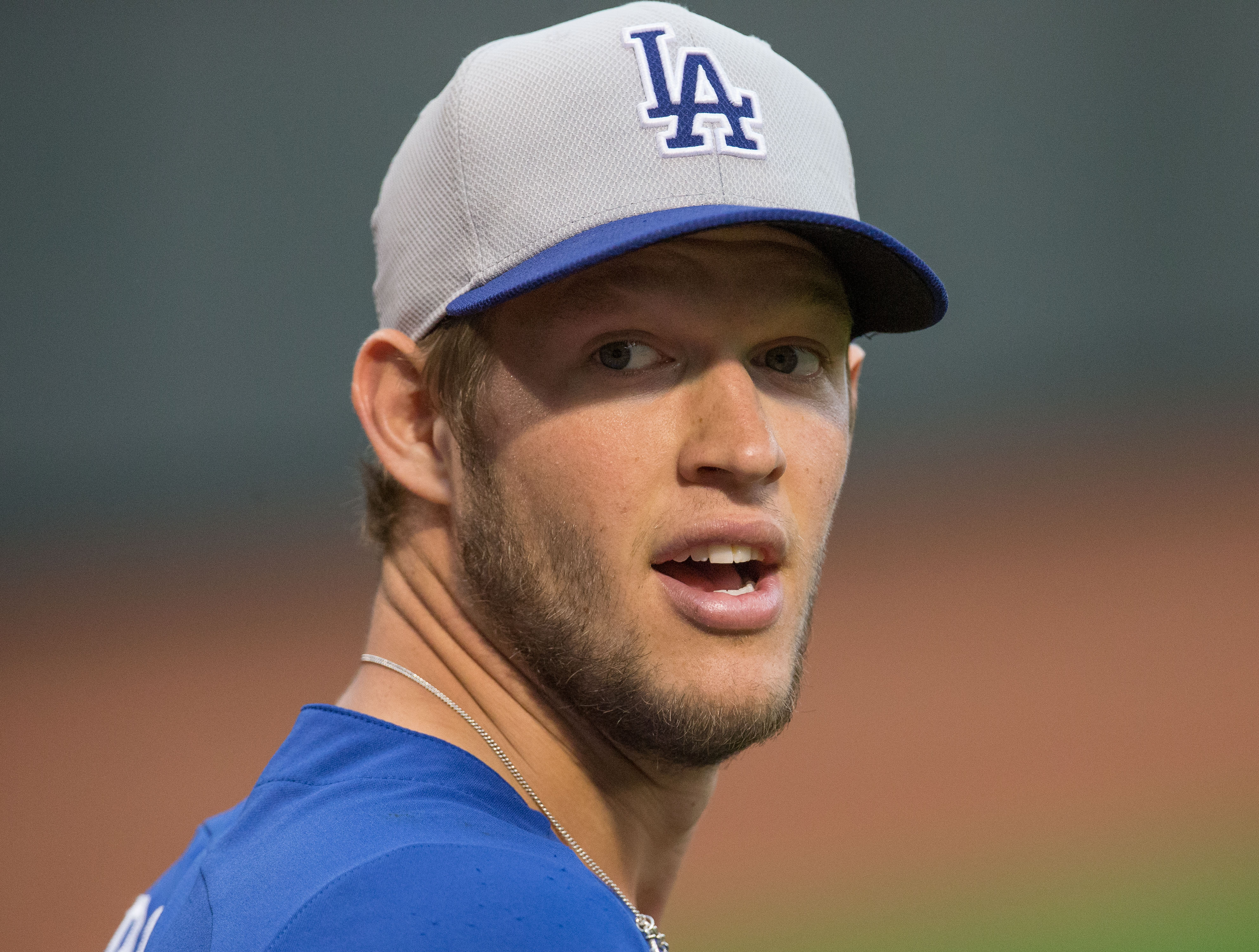
Kershaw won numerous awards for his 2011 campaign

Kershaw was selected to the National League team for the MLB All-Star Game, his first All-Star selection. In the month of July, Kershaw was 4–1 with a 2.02 ERA and NL-leading 45 strikeouts, earning him the NL Pitcher of the Month Award. On August 23, he recorded his 200th strikeout of the season and became the tenth Dodger pitcher to record back-to-back 200 strikeout seasons and the first since Chan-Ho Park did it in the 2001 season.

Throughout the season, Kershaw pitched opposite two-time Cy Young Award winner and three-time defending NL strikeout leader Tim Lincecum of the San Francisco Giants in four particularly memorable matchups. Lincecum posted a 1.24 ERA over 29 innings in the four games but failed to record a win, as Kershaw countered with a 0.30 ERA over 30 1/3 innings and was the winning pitcher in each game. Each game was decided by a final score of 1–0 or 2–1, with many writers describing the matchups as reminiscent of epic pitching duels of bygone eras.

Kershaw finished the 2011 season by leading the NL with 21 wins, 248 strikeouts, and a 2.28 ERA, winning the NL pitching Triple Crown, the first Triple Crown winner since Jake Peavy of the 2007 San Diego Padres. Justin Verlander of the Detroit Tigers won the American League Triple Crown the same season, marking the first major-league season since 1924 to feature Triple Crown-winning pitchers in both leagues. Kershaw also became just the second left-hander to have 240-plus strikeouts in a season before the age of 24, joining Vida Blue.

After the season, Kershaw was awarded the Warren Spahn Award as the best left-handed pitcher, the Players Choice Award for Most Outstanding National League pitcher, the Gold Glove Award as the top fielding pitcher, and the Sporting News (TSN) National League Pitcher of the Year. He was additionally selected as the starting pitcher for the TSN NL All-Star Team. On November 17, he was honored with the National League Cy Young Award, making him the youngest Cy Young winner since Dwight Gooden of the 1985 New York Mets. He was the eighth Dodger pitcher to win the award.

=== 2012 season: Cy Young runner-up ===
On February 7, 2012, Kershaw and the Dodgers agreed on a two-year, $19 million contract. The contract was the second highest for a player in his first year of arbitration (after Tim Lincecum's $23 million 2-year contract in 2010).

Kershaw was the Dodgers' Opening Day starter for a second consecutive year, where he pitched three innings of shutout ball against the San Diego Padres at Petco Park before being removed from the game due to flu-like symptoms. On April 27, he was able to last through eight innings for his second win of the season against the Washington Nationals. The win was also his 12th straight home win, tying him with Ed Roebuck (June 1960 – August 1962) and Orel Hershiser (September 1984 – October 1985) for the longest home winning streak since the Dodgers moved to Los Angeles. Kershaw won the National League's Player of the Week Award for the week of May 14–20 after he made two starts during that week and pitched 16 scoreless innings, including his fourth career shutout. Kershaw was selected to appear in the All-Star Game, the second straight year he made the team.

On August 11, he went over 200 innings on the season, becoming the 12th Los Angeles Dodger pitcher with three or more seasons of 200 or more innings, and the first since Hershiser did it five times from 1985 to 1989. Kershaw also became just the fifth Dodger pitcher with three straight 200 strikeout seasons.

Kershaw finished 2012 with a 14–9 record, a 2.53 ERA (leading the league), 229 strikeouts, and 227 2/3 innings pitched, coming second in both categories. He became the first pitcher to lead the league in ERA in consecutive seasons since Arizona's Randy Johnson in 2001–02. This also marked his fourth consecutive season with a sub-3.00 ERA, making him the first to do this since Randy Johnson from 1999 to 2002. He finished second for the NL Cy Young behind R. A. Dickey, receiving two first-place votes.

=== 2013 season: Second Cy Young Award ===
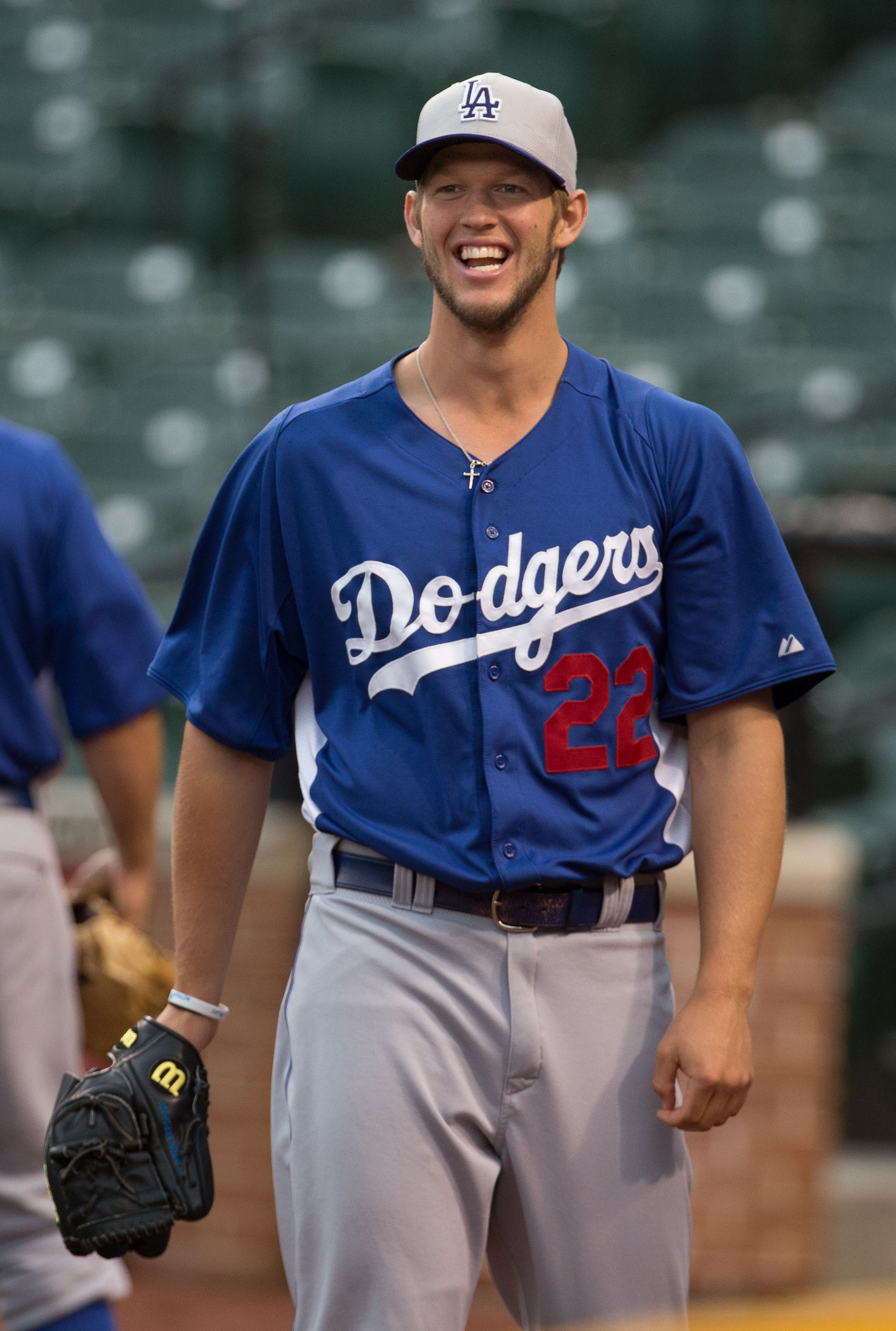
Kershaw with the Dodgers in 2013

Kershaw made his third straight opening day start for the Dodgers in the 2013 season, the first Dodger starter to do so since Derek Lowe (2005–2007). In that opening day start, he pitched a complete game, four-hit, 4–0 shutout over the Giants, having also scored the first run of the game, a solo home run which was his first and so far only home run of his career. He was the first pitcher to throw a shutout and hit a home run on opening day since Bob Lemon of the Cleveland Indians did so against the Chicago White Sox on April 14, 1953. Kershaw picked up his 1,000th career strikeout on April 17, when he struck out Yonder Alonso of the Padres. He was the second youngest Dodger to reach that mark, behind only Fernando Valenzuela. On May 14, Kershaw passed the 1,000 inning mark for his career. His ERA of 2.70 at the time was the fifth-best of the live-ball era at the 1,000-inning mark and the best career mark. He also threw 130 pitches that day, the most of his career and the most by a Dodger pitcher since Odalis Pérez in the 2003 season.

Kershaw was selected to the All-Star Game, his third straight selection. In July, he compiled a 4–1 record and 1.34 ERA in six starts and was awarded his second National League Pitcher of the Month Award. On September 2, Kershaw picked up his 200th strikeout, recording his fourth consecutive season with at least 200 strikeouts.

Kershaw finished the season with a 16–9 record, 236 innings pitched (a career-high), and a major league-best 1.83 ERA and 0.92 WHIP. He was the third player in history to lead the major leagues in ERA in three consecutive years, joining Greg Maddux (1993–95) and Lefty Grove (1929–31). His ERA was the first sub-2.00 ERA since Roger Clemens did it in the 2005 season and the lowest overall since Pedro Martínez in the 2000 season.

Kershaw struck out 12 batters in seven innings in the first game of the NLDS. His six straight strikeouts in the game tied an MLB postseason record set by Tim Belcher in the second game of the 1988 World Series. He picked up his first career postseason victory in that game.

Kershaw won the Warren Spahn Award for 2013, the second time he had won the award, which honors the best left-handed pitcher in the MLB. On November 13, he won the NL Cy Young Award for the second time in three seasons. He became just the sixth pitcher in history to finish in the top two in voting in three consecutive seasons.

After the season, Kershaw and the Dodgers agreed on a seven-year, $215 million, contract extension. The deal was the richest in MLB history for a pitcher, eclipsing the seven-year, $180 million, contract signed by Justin Verlander the previous year. The average annual value of $30.7 million was also the largest ever for a baseball player, beating the $28 million Roger Clemens received in 2007 and the 10-year, $275 million contract that Alex Rodriguez signed that same year.

=== 2014 season: MVP and third Cy Young Award ===
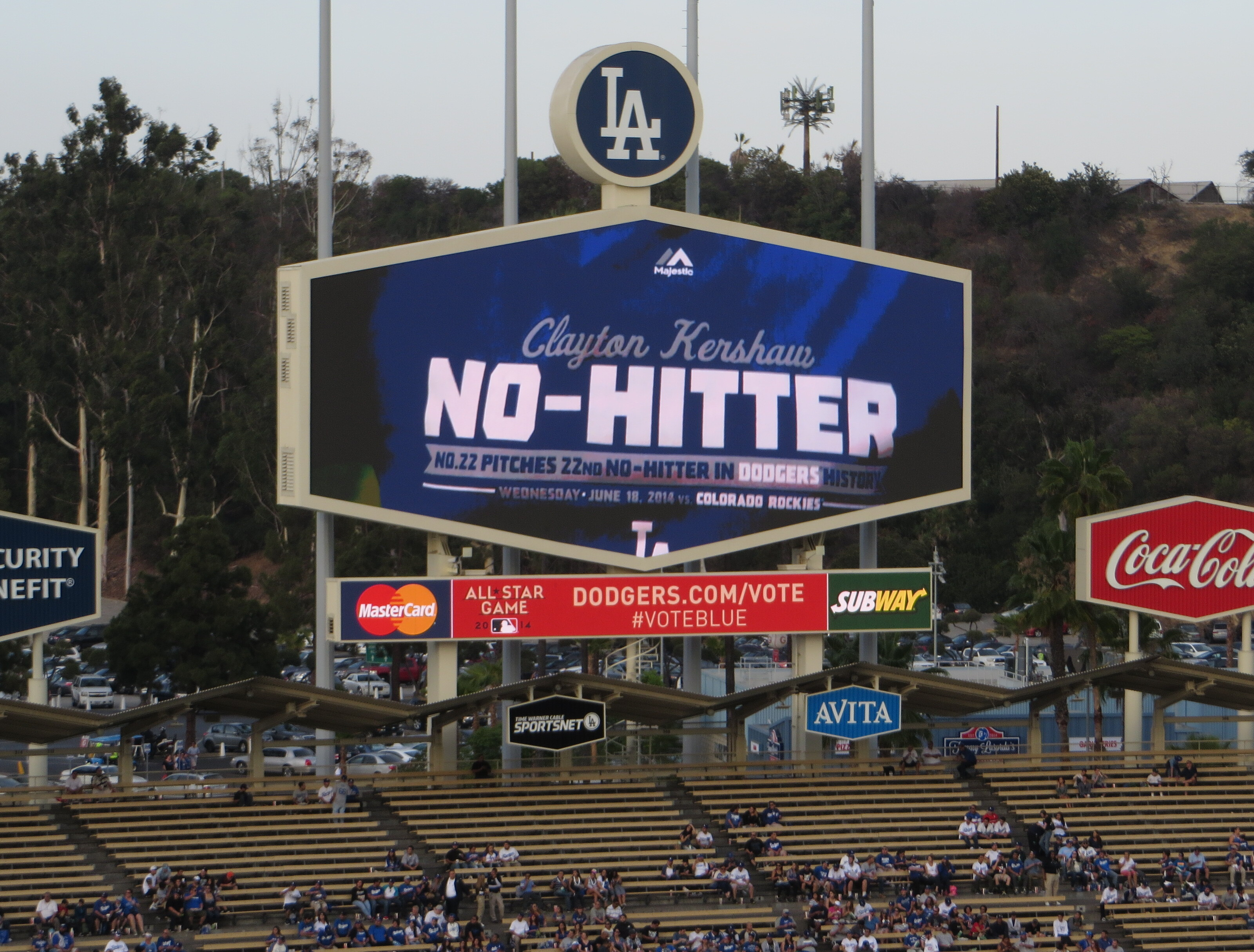
Dodger Stadium scoreboard commemorating Kershaw's 2014 no-hitter

Kershaw made his fourth straight opening day start for the Dodgers in 2014, only the fourth Dodger ever to do so. This season the game was played at the Sydney Cricket Ground in Australia. Before his second start, Kershaw felt some pain in his back and was placed on the disabled list for the first time in his career. He rejoined the Dodgers in early May. On June 18, he pitched a complete game no-hitter against the Colorado Rockies and struck out a career-high 15 batters. The only batter to reach base was due to an error by Hanley Ramírez in the top of the seventh inning. He is one of two pitchers in MLB history, along with Max Scherzer, with 15 strikeouts in a game while allowing no hits and no walks. It was the 22nd no-hitter in Dodgers history. Kershaw was 6–0 with an 0.82 ERA in June and was awarded his third career Pitcher of the Month award. He was selected to the National League squad at the All-Star Game, his fourth straight selection.

Kershaw recorded a scoreless innings streak of 41 innings which started on June 13 and ended in the top of the sixth inning on July 10 when, with two outs, Chase Headley homered to left field at Dodger Stadium. At the time, the 41-inning streak was tied for the fifteenth-longest scoreless inning streak in MLB history. He won the pitcher of the month award again in July, the third Dodger (along with Don Sutton and Burt Hooton) to win it in two consecutive months. He was 4–0 with a 1.10 ERA in the month with 48 strikeouts and only 10 walks. He picked up his 200th strikeout of the season on September 2, the fifth consecutive year he had reached that number. He also became just the fourth pitcher since 1893 to have at least five 200-strikeout seasons through an age-26 season (Bert Blyleven, Walter Johnson and Sam McDowell are the others).

Kershaw finished the season 21–3 with a 1.77 ERA in 27 starts. He led the National League in numerous categories once again, such as ERA, ERA+, Wins, Win %, WHIP, IP/GS, SO/9, Strikeout-to-walk ratio, complete games, FIP, and Wins Above Replacement for both pitchers and all NL players. He also finished third in strikeouts despite missing most of the first month of the season. He was the first pitcher in history to win four consecutive major league-leading ERA titles.

However, in his first start of the playoffs, in Game 1 of the NLDS against the Cardinals, Kershaw became the first pitcher in history to strike out 10 while allowing eight runs. Allowing only two hits in the first six innings, both solo home runs, he surrendered six runs in the seventh. He was also the first pitcher in history to give up at least seven runs in back-to-back postseason starts (his previous one was Game 6 of the 2013 NLCS). Pitching on short rest in Game 4, he pitched well but lost after giving up a 3-run home run to Matt Adams in the 7th inning. It was the first home run Kershaw had allowed in his career to a left-handed batter off his curveball.

Kershaw was honored after the season with the player of the year awards from both The Sporting News and Baseball America. He won three awards at the Players Choice Awards including Outstanding NL Pitcher, Player of the Year and the Marvin Miller Man of the Year Award. He also won his third (and second straight) Warren Spahn Award. On November 12, he was awarded his third Cy Young Award in four seasons (a unanimous vote). The following day, he was elected as the NL MVP, the first National League pitcher to win the award since Bob Gibson in 1968 and the first Dodgers player to win the award since Kirk Gibson in 1988.

=== 2015 season: 300-strikeout season ===
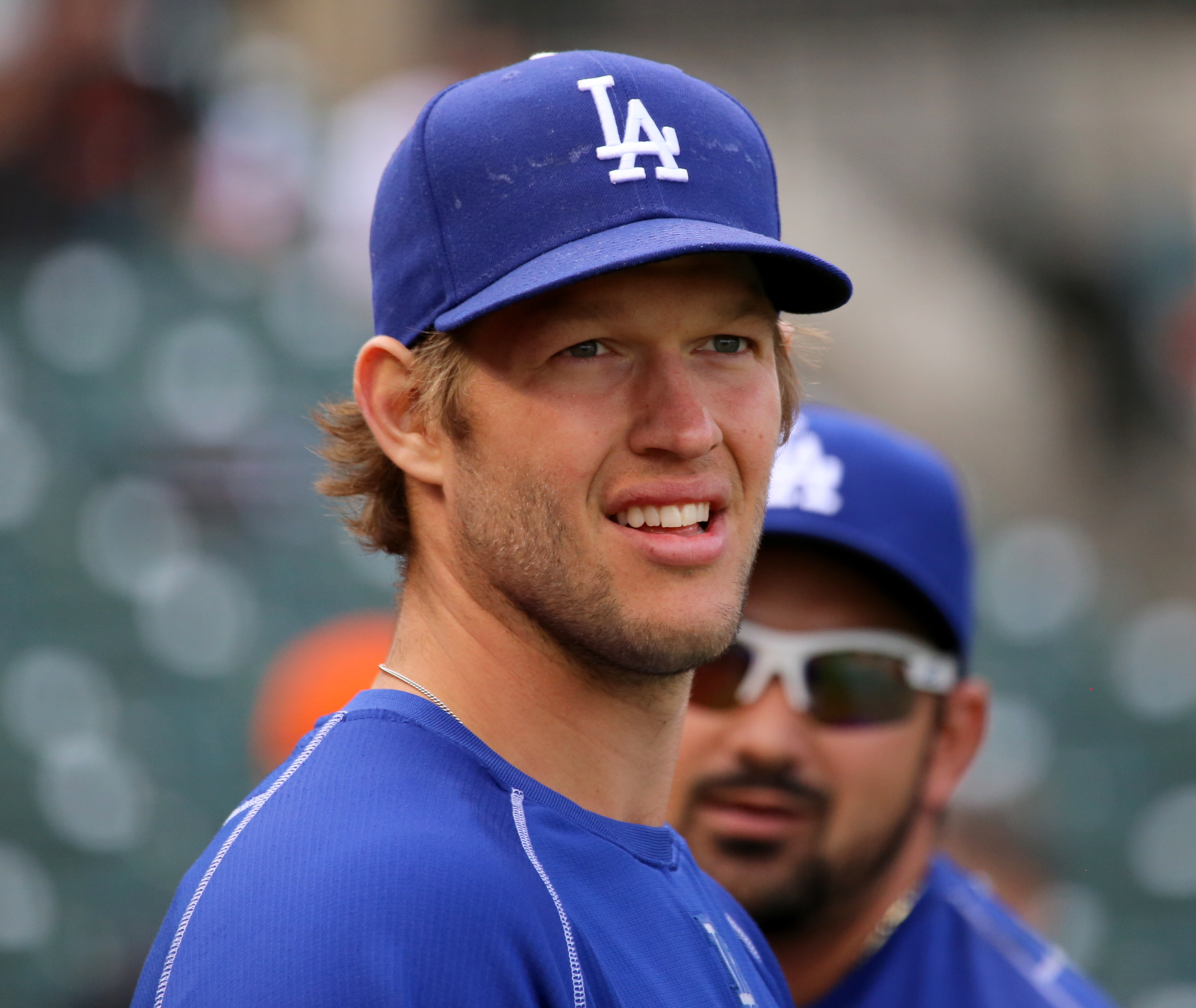
Kershaw with the Dodgers in 2015

Kershaw made his fifth consecutive opening day start in 2015, the first Dodgers pitcher to do so since Hall of Famer Don Sutton had seven consecutive from 1972 through 1978. He recorded his 1,500th career strikeout on May 10 when he fanned Drew Stubbs of the Colorado Rockies. Kershaw picked up his 100th career win on May 15 against the Rockies. He became the 22nd pitcher in franchise history, and the second-youngest active pitcher, to reach that mark. Kershaw won his sixth career NL Player of the Week award for the week of June 1–7, when he allowed only two runs on 10 baserunners in 15 innings while striking out 18 in two starts.

Kershaw did not make the initial NL roster for the All-Star Game, though he was included on the Final Vote ballot, which he lost to Cardinals pitcher Carlos Martínez. However, he was added to the roster to replace Nationals pitcher Max Scherzer, who was unavailable due to pitching the Sunday before the game.

Kershaw struck out a season-high 14 batters in eight shutout innings on July 18 against the Washington Nationals. He became the first Dodgers starter with back-to-back games of at least 13 strikeouts since Chan Ho Park in 2000, and the first Dodgers pitcher with back-to-back games of double-digit strikeouts and no walks since Dazzy Vance in 1930. He shared the NL Player of the Week honors with his teammate Zack Greinke for the week of July 13–19 and won NL Pitcher of the Month for July.

Kershaw picked up his 200th strikeout of the season on August 12, tying Hideo Nomo's 1995 season for the fastest to that mark in Dodgers history at 156 innings; it was also his sixth straight 200-strikeout season. On October 4, Kershaw became the 11th player in MLB history to strike out 300 batters in a season, and the first player to do so since Randy Johnson did it in 2002. He finished the season with a 16–7 record, a 2.13 ERA, and 301 strikeouts in 232 2/3 innings.

In Game One of the NLDS, Kershaw struck out 11 in 6 2/3 innings but allowed three runs for his fifth straight postseason loss. He and New York Mets starter Jacob deGrom were the first pair of starters to each throw at least 11 strikeouts in the same postseason game in MLB history. He rebounded in Game Four, earning the win on three days' rest by allowing one run and three hits against eight strikeouts in seven innings on October 13. Kershaw finished third in the National League Cy Young Award voting, placing behind teammate Zack Greinke and eventual winner Jake Arrieta.

=== 2016 season: Injury-plagued year ===
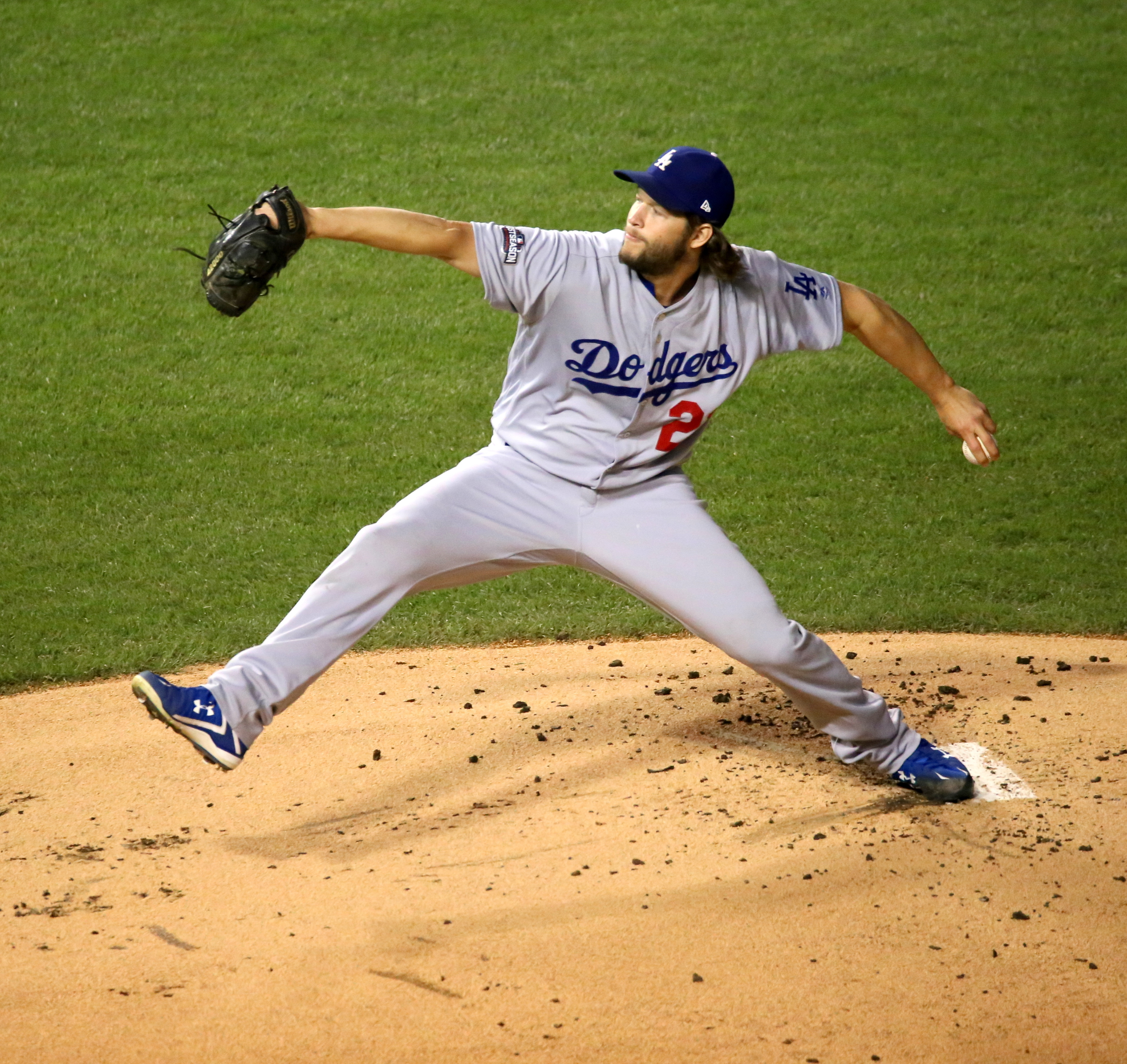
Kershaw delivers a pitch during Game 6 of the 2016 NLCS against the Chicago Cubs

Kershaw made his sixth straight opening day start in 2016 as the Dodgers won 15–0. It also marked the first time the Dodgers had won six straight opening-day games, all of which he started. On May 12 against the New York Mets, he struck out 13 while pitching a three-hit complete-game shutout.

He set an MLB record with six consecutive starts with at least 10 strikeouts and no more than one walk and a club record with six consecutive starts with at least 10 strikeouts. He picked up his 100th strikeout on May 29, while only walking five batters within that period. That was the lowest walk total for a pitcher reaching 100 strikeouts in the modern era, beating Cliff Lee who had seven walks in the 2010 season. On June 30, Kershaw was placed on the 15-day disabled list due to back pain. He received an MRI, which revealed that there was a mild herniated disc in the back, and received an epidural injection to treat the pain.

He was named to the All-Star team but was unable to pitch in the game due to his injury. On July 20, the Dodgers shut down Kershaw for an indefinite period. He continued to feel discomfort in his back after a simulated game. On August 3, Kershaw was transferred to the 60-day disabled list. He rejoined the Dodger rotation on September 9.

He started 21 games in 2016, with a 12–4 record and a 1.69 ERA. He also struck out 172 batters with 11 walks in 149 innings pitched.

Kershaw started Games 1 and 4 of the NLDS and picked up the save in the clinching Game 5. It was his first professional save since he was with the Gulf Coast Dodgers in his first minor league season in 2006. He next pitched seven shutout innings, allowing only two hits, in Game 2 of the NLCS against the Chicago Cubs. He struggled in Game 6, allowing five runs in five innings to pick up the loss as the Dodgers were eliminated from the playoffs.

=== 2017 season: First World Series appearance ===
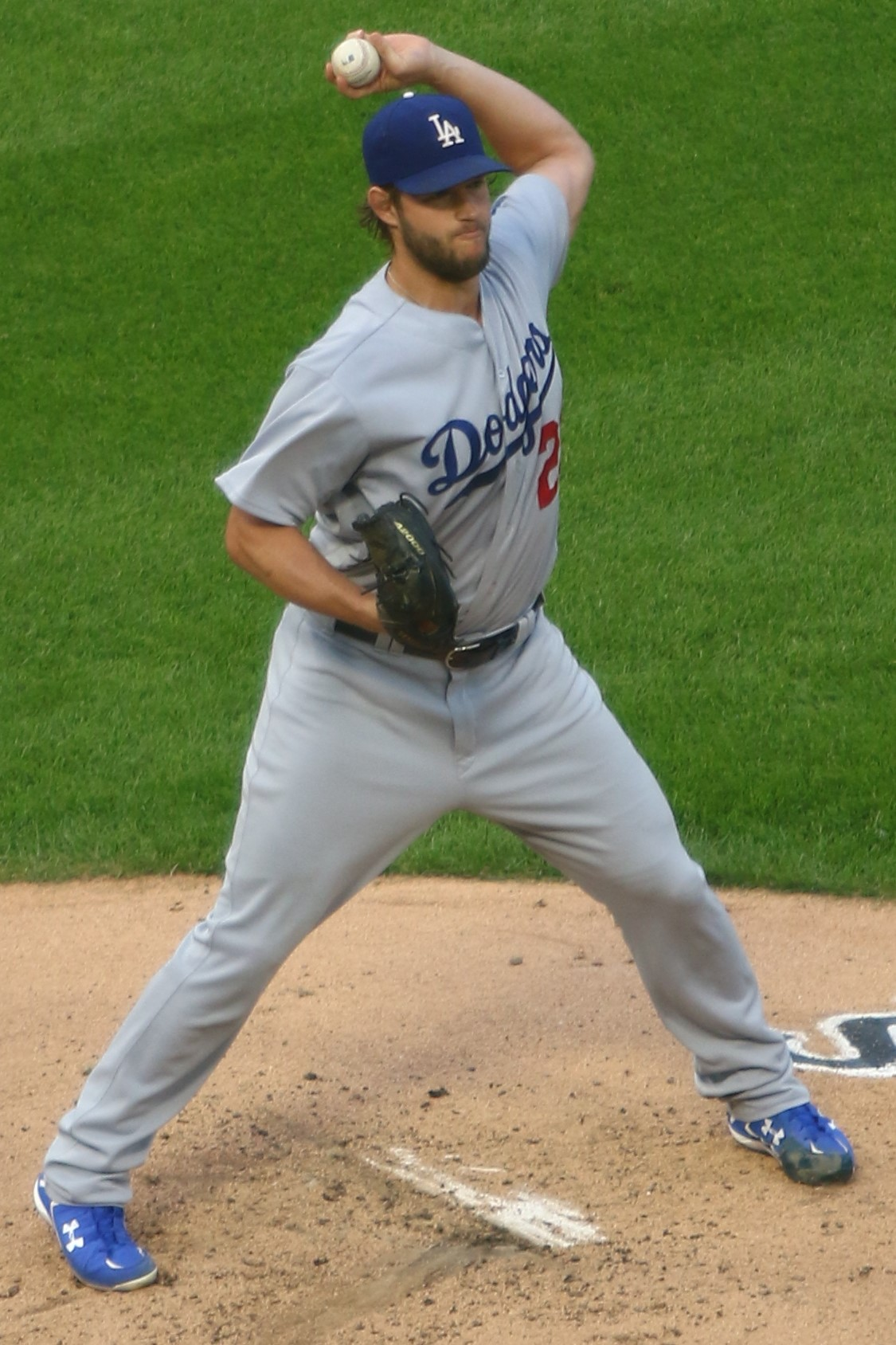
Kershaw attempts a pickoff in 2017

Kershaw made his seventh straight Opening Day start, tying Don Sutton for most consecutive Opening Day starts, and Sutton and Don Drysdale for most total opening day starts by a Dodger. On June 2, he struck out Jonathan Villar of the Milwaukee Brewers for his 2,000th career strikeout. He was the fifth-youngest player in major league history to reach that mark, as well as the second-fastest pitcher to 2,000 strikeouts, accomplishing the feat in 277 games (behind Randy Johnson's 262 games). He was named to his seventh straight All-Star Game. On July 23, Kershaw left the game due to back tightness. The same day, he was placed on the 10-day disabled list. He returned to the mound on September 1, but despite his extended absence, he went on to lead the National League in earned run average and wins.

In 27 starts, he was 18–4 with a 2.31 ERA and 202 strikeouts. He led all major league pitchers in left on base percentage, stranding 87.4% of base runners. He also led all major league pitchers in first-strike percentage (69.4%).

In the opener of the NLDS against the Arizona Diamondbacks, he allowed four solo home runs in 6 1/3 innings but still picked up the win. The four home runs were tied for the most allowed in a postseason game. He made two starts in the NLCS against the Chicago Cubs, both Dodgers wins, including the clinching game five. He allowed three runs in 11 innings in the two games with nine strikeouts and only two walks. Kershaw started the opening game of the World Series for the Dodgers against the Houston Astros. He struck out 11 batters in the game without walking anyone and only allowed one run (a solo homer) on three hits to pick up the win. His 11 strikeouts were the third most ever by a Dodgers pitcher in a World Series game, after Sandy Koufax (15 in 1963) and Carl Erskine (14 in 1953). He made another start in the fifth game of the series, but he did not pitch as well this time, allowing six runs on four hits in 4 2/3 innings. Notably, he threw 39 sliders and generated only one swing and miss all game. Although he received criticism after this start for his continued postseason struggles, the later revelation of the Astros sign stealing scandal as a possible factor has complicated assessments of his performance in this game. He came back in game seven to pitch four scoreless innings of relief in the game, and in the process, he broke Orel Hershiser's Dodgers post-season record with his 33rd strikeout. However, the Dodgers lost the game and the series.

Kershaw was selected as a starting pitcher on Baseball America's All-MLB Team and finished second in Cy Young Award voting.

=== 2018 season: Second World Series appearance ===
Kershaw made his team-record eighth opening-day start in 2018. He allowed only one run in six innings with seven strikeouts against the Giants but still lost the game 1–0. It was his first opening-day loss. On May 6, Kershaw was placed on the disabled list due to left biceps tendinitis. He returned to the team for one start on May 31, during which he experienced a recurrence of his chronic back pain and was put back on the disabled list. He rejoined the roster on June 23. He had a record of 9–5 with a 2.73 ERA and 155 strikeouts in 2018, his lowest win total and highest ERA since 2010 and fewest strikeouts since his rookie season.

In a surprising move, Dave Roberts chose Hyun-jin Ryu to pitch the Dodgers' first playoff game of the 2018 NLDS against the Atlanta Braves. It was the first time since 2009 that Kershaw had not started the first game of the playoffs for the Dodgers. He started the second game of the series and pitched eight scoreless innings while allowing only two hits. He then started the opener of the 2018 NLCS against the Milwaukee Brewers, but turned in the shortest postseason start of his career, replaced with no outs in the fourth inning after allowing five runs on six hits and two walks. He had better results in Game 5, pitching seven innings and allowing one run on three hits and two walks while striking out nine. He also walked twice as a batter, becoming just the third pitcher in the last 20 years to do so in a postseason game (after Jon Lester in the 2016 NLCS and Derek Lowe in the 2008 NLDS).

Kershaw made two starts for the Dodgers in the World Series against the Boston Red Sox. In Game 1 he pitched four innings and gave up five runs in an 8–4 loss, and in Game 5 he pitched seven innings and allowed four runs, including three home runs as the Red Sox won the Series 4–1; it was the Dodgers' second straight World Series defeat.

Kershaw's contract allowed him to opt out and become a free agent after the 2018 season, but on November 2 he and the team agreed to a new three-year, $93 million contract. This extended his previous contract by one year and $28 million.

=== 2019 season: More injuries and an early playoff exit ===
Kershaw experienced left shoulder inflammation early in spring training, causing him to be shut down and he did not begin throwing in spring until late. As a result, the Dodgers chose to place him on the injured list to begin the season, ending his Dodgers record streak of eight straight opening-day starts. He was selected to the All-Star Game, his eighth all-star appearance.

On August 14, Kershaw picked up his 165th career win on against the Miami Marlins, tying Koufax for the most ever by a Dodger left-handed pitcher. He also struck out the first seven batters in the game, breaking a Dodger record previously held by Andy Messersmith (1973) and one short of the major league record. Kershaw picked up his 166th career win on August 20 against the Toronto Blue Jays, passing Koufax for the most wins ever by a Dodger left-handed pitcher. That game also marked only the sixth time in his career that Kershaw gave up two home runs in the same game to the same batter, Bo Bichette, and only the first time Kershaw did so to a rookie.

Kershaw finished the 2019 regular season with a record of 16–5 with a 3.03 ERA with 189 strikeouts. On offense, he led the major leagues with 15 sacrifice hits.

In the NLDS against the Washington Nationals, Kershaw started Game 2 and entered Game 5 in relief. In Game 2, Kershaw pitched six innings and allowed three runs in a 4–2 loss. In Game 5, he entered the game in relief of Walker Buehler with two outs in the seventh inning and struck out Adam Eaton. In the eighth inning, Kershaw allowed home runs on back-to-back pitches to Anthony Rendon and Juan Soto to surrender a 3–1 lead, and the Nationals won the game and the series.

=== 2020 season: First World Series championship ===
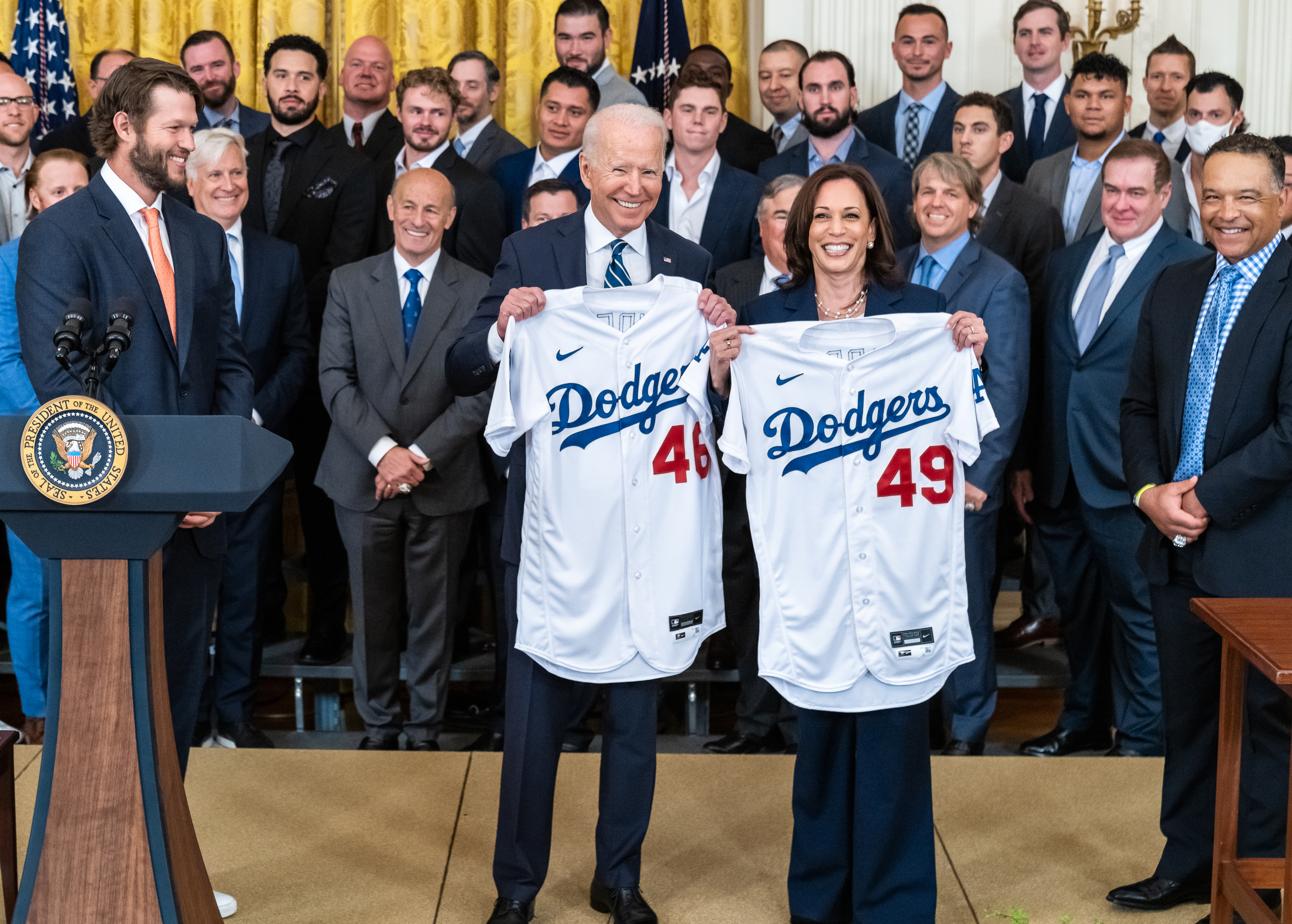
Kershaw (at the podium to the left) with President Joe Biden and Vice President Kamala Harris during the Dodgers' White House championship celebration.

Kershaw was scheduled to start on opening day in the season shorted by the COVID-19 pandemic, but he hurt his back in the weight room and was placed on the injured list to start the season. Instead, rookie Dustin May got his first Opening Day nod. On August 20, he passed Don Drysdale for the second-most strikeouts in franchise history. Kershaw started 10 games for the Dodgers in 2020, with a 6–2 record, 2.16 ERA and 62 strikeouts. He started the second game of the Wild Card Series against the Milwaukee Brewers and threw eight scoreless innings while only allowing three hits and striking out 13. In the NLDS against the San Diego Padres, he also started the second game and allowed three runs in six innings while striking out six. Kershaw was scratched from his scheduled Game 2 start in the NLCS against the Atlanta Braves because of back spasms and started Game 4 instead, where he allowed four runs in five innings for his first loss of the 2020 postseason. He started the first game of the World Series against the Tampa Bay Rays, tying Greg Maddux for second place all-time with 11 postseason Game 1 starts. Kershaw allowed only one run in six innings in the game while striking out eight, in the process passing John Smoltz for second place all-time in postseason strikeouts with 201. Kershaw started again in Game 5, pitching 5 2/3 innings, allowing two runs on five hits and two walks. He struck out six in the game to pass Justin Verlander for the most strikeouts in postseason history (207). The Dodgers went on to defeat the Rays in six games to win their first World Series championship since 1988. After the season, Kershaw was named to the All-MLB Second Team.

=== 2021 season: Third injury-plagued year ===
Kershaw made his ninth opening day start for the Dodgers, after having missed doing so the previous two seasons because of injuries. He remained in the rotation until July 7, when he was placed on the injured list with left forearm inflammation, the first time in his career he had gone on the IL with an arm injury. Initially it was hoped he would only miss a short time, but he had setbacks in his rehab which necessitated a longer stint on the injured list. He finally rejoined the Dodgers rotation on September 13, allowing only one run in 4 1/3 innings against the Diamondbacks. However, he experienced more arm pain in an October 1 game against the Brewers, causing him to leave the game in the second inning. An MRI showed no ligament damage, but Kershaw was placed back on the injured list and ruled out for the 2021 post-season. He started 22 games for the Dodgers during the season, with a 10–8 record and 3.55 ERA, the highest since his rookie season.

=== 2022 season: Franchise strikeout record and more injuries ===
Kershaw in 2022

On March 13, 2022, Kershaw signed a one-year deal worth $17 million to return to the Dodgers. In his first start of the season, on April 13 against the Minnesota Twins, Kershaw struck out 13 batters in seven perfect innings before he was removed by the manager. Despite only being at 80 pitches, Kershaw said he agreed with the decision because he had not been built up due to a shortened spring training caused by the offseason lockout.

On April 30, Kershaw set the Dodgers franchise strikeout record, striking out Spencer Torkelson of the Detroit Tigers to move past Don Sutton. On July 15, Kershaw had another perfect game bid against the Los Angeles Angels, where he threw seven perfect innings until it was broken up by a lead-off double by Luis Rengifo in the eighth inning.

Kershaw was chosen to start the All-Star Game at Dodger Stadium. It was his ninth All-Star selection and the first time he was chosen to start. In his one inning of work, he allowed one hit and one walk with a strikeout and picked off Shohei Ohtani from first base. For the season, Kershaw made 22 starts and finished with a 12–3 record and 2.28 ERA. He had two stints on the injured list: in May due to a pelvic joint inflammation, and in August due to an issue in his back.

In the NLDS, Kershaw started Game 2 against the San Diego Padres, allowing three runs on seven hits across five innings. He left the game tied, with the Dodgers eventually losing the game and then losing the series to the Padres three games to one. Following the season, Kershaw again re-signed with the Dodgers, for one year and $15 million, with a $5 million signing bonus.

=== 2023 season: Fourth injury-plagued year ===
Before the 2023 season, Kershaw committed to pitch for the United States in the 2023 World Baseball Classic but withdrew from the team in February, reportedly due to his inability to get insurance in case of injury.

On April 18, Kershaw recorded his 200th career win against the New York Mets, becoming the third pitcher in Dodgers history to accomplish that feat. For the month of April, Kershaw was selected as the NL Pitcher of the Month.

He struggled during the month of May, recording a 5.55 ERA, before rebounding in June. He was selected to the All-Star Game, his tenth selection, tying Pee Wee Reese for the most all-time by a Dodgers player. Before the All-Star break, he was placed on the injured list due to a sore left shoulder. On September 23, he picked up his 210th win, passing Don Drysdale for second most in franchise history. Kershaw finished the regular season with a 13–5 record, 2.46 ERA and 137 strikeouts in 131 2/3 innings, his highest total since the 2019 season.

Kershaw opened the Dodgers' 2023 postseason with the worst start of his career in Game 1 of the NLDS. He allowed six runs against the Diamondbacks while only recording one out. The Diamondbacks ended up sweeping the Dodgers in three games. In the offseason, on November 3, he underwent surgery on his left shoulder to repair the glenohumeral ligaments and capsule.

=== 2024 season: More injuries and career lows ===
Kershaw stated that his recovery from surgery and injury would keep him out of game action for at least the first half of the season. Despite that, on February 9, 2024, he re-signed with the Dodgers on a one-year, $10 million contract with a player option for the 2025 season. Kershaw was activated off the injured list on July 25 to make his season debut against the Giants.

In his first start in 2024, he pitched four innings and struck out six batters against the Giants. On July 31, he lasted only 3 2/3 innings in a loss to the Padres, allowing seven runs and failing to record a strikeout for the first time during a start. On August 12, Kershaw got his first win of the season against the Brewers, where he pitched 5 2/3 innings, giving up three hits and one earned run, while striking out six batters. On August 31, Kershaw was placed on the 15-day injured list due to a bone spur in his left big toe. That injury kept him sidelined for the remainder of the regular season and the entire postseason. He only managed to make seven starts in 2024, pitching 30 innings with a 2–2 record and 4.50 ERA, all career lows.

With Kershaw sidelined for the remainder of the year, the Dodgers won the World Series against the New York Yankees. After the season, he revealed that he would undergo surgery for a torn meniscus in his left knee as well as for a ruptured plantar plate and bone spurs in his left big toe. On November 4, he declined the 2025 player option on his contract, making him a free agent.

=== 2025 season: 3,000 strikeouts and final season ===
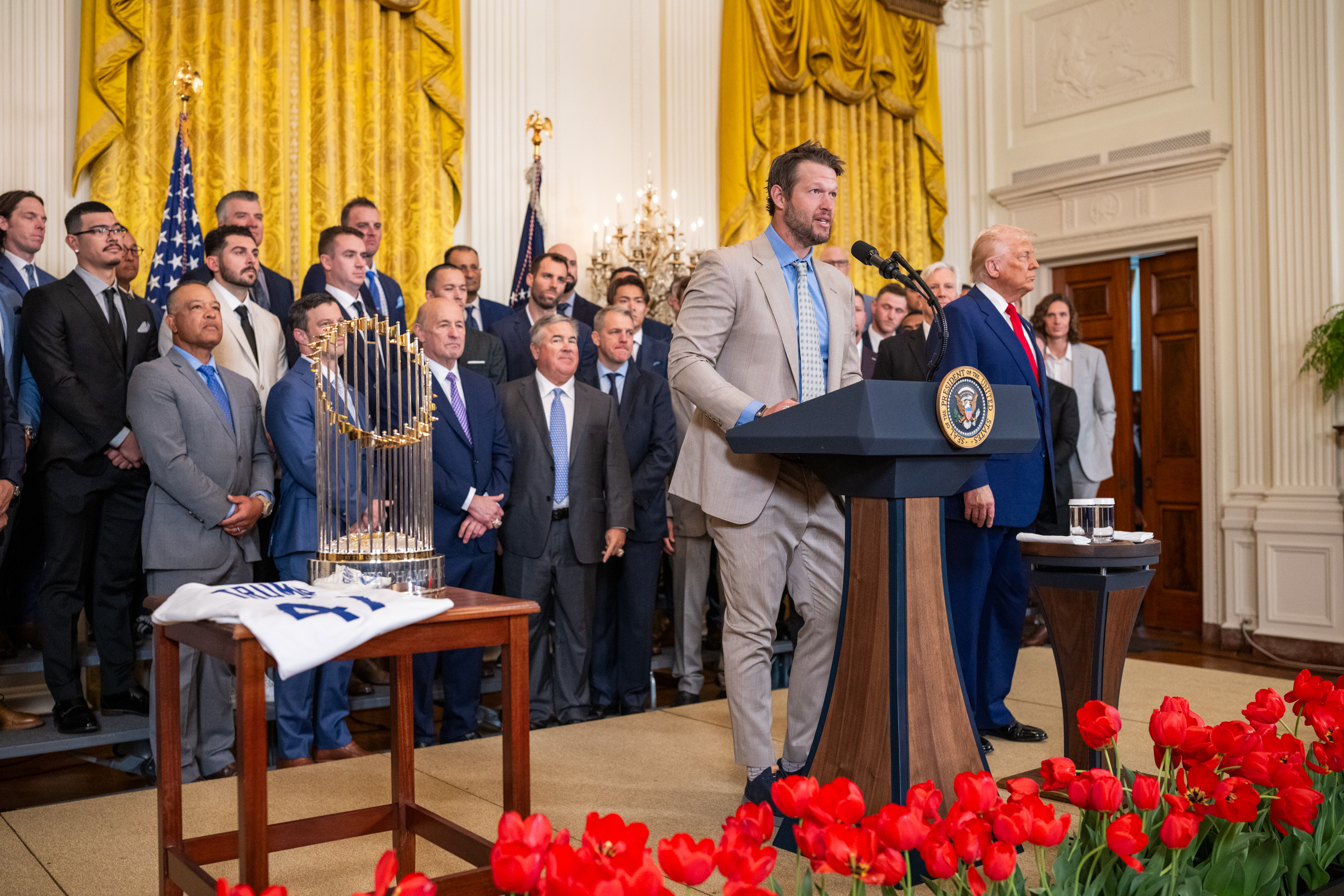
Kershaw and the Dodgers with the Commissioner's Trophy (left) and President Donald Trump (far right) at the White House in April 2025.

On February 13, 2025, Kershaw again re-signed with the Dodgers, on a one-year, $7.5 million contract, that also included roster and game-started bonuses. His 18th season with the Dodgers matched the longest for any player in franchise history, joining Zack Wheat and Bill Russell. He also became the 59th player in MLB history to spend 18 seasons with one team.

After beginning the season on the injured list while recovering from his off-season surgery, Kershaw rejoined the Dodgers active roster on May 17. In his first game back, he allowed five earned runs on five hits while recording three walks and two strikeouts in four innings. On June 8, Kershaw got his first win of the season, pitching five innings, allowing six hits and one earned run, and striking out seven batters against the Cardinals.

Kershaw picked up his 3,000th career strikeout on July 2, against Vinny Capra of the Chicago White Sox. He became the 20th pitcher and fourth left-handed pitcher in MLB history to reach that mark as well as the fifth to do so as a member of one team. He was selected to the All-Star Game as a legends pick by MLB commissioner Rob Manfred, his 11th all-star selection.

On September 18, 2025, Kershaw announced he would retire at the end of the season, one day before making his final regular season Dodger Stadium start, against the Giants. His final MLB start was on the last day of the 2025 season, September 28, against the Seattle Mariners. He pitched 5 1/3 scoreless innings, struck out seven, and allowed only four hits and one walk. He struck out the last batter he faced, Eugenio Suárez, for the 3,052nd and last strikeout of his career. He finished his final season with an 11–2 record, 3.36 ERA, and 84 strikeouts in 23 games.

Kershaw made two appearances in the postseason for the Dodgers. In the third game of the NLDS against the Phillies he pitched two innings, allowing five runs (four earned) on six hits and three walks. His final career appearance was in the top of the 12th inning of the third game of the World Series against the Toronto Blue Jays. He entered the game with the bases loaded and two outs to face Nathan Lukes and got him to ground out to end the inning. The Dodgers went on to win the series in seven games, the team's third title during his career.

=== 2026 World Baseball Classic ===
Despite retiring from MLB, Kershaw joined Team USA at the 2026 World Baseball Classic. He pitched in an exhibition game against the Colorado Rockies but not in any WBC games in the tournament, in which the U.S. won the silver medal.

== Post-playing career ==
Kershaw signed with NBC Sports as an analyst for select Sunday Night Baseball games beginning with Opening Day in 2026.

On March 27, 2026, the Dodgers announced that Kershaw would remain attached to the team as a special assistant in the baseball operations department.

== Pitching style ==
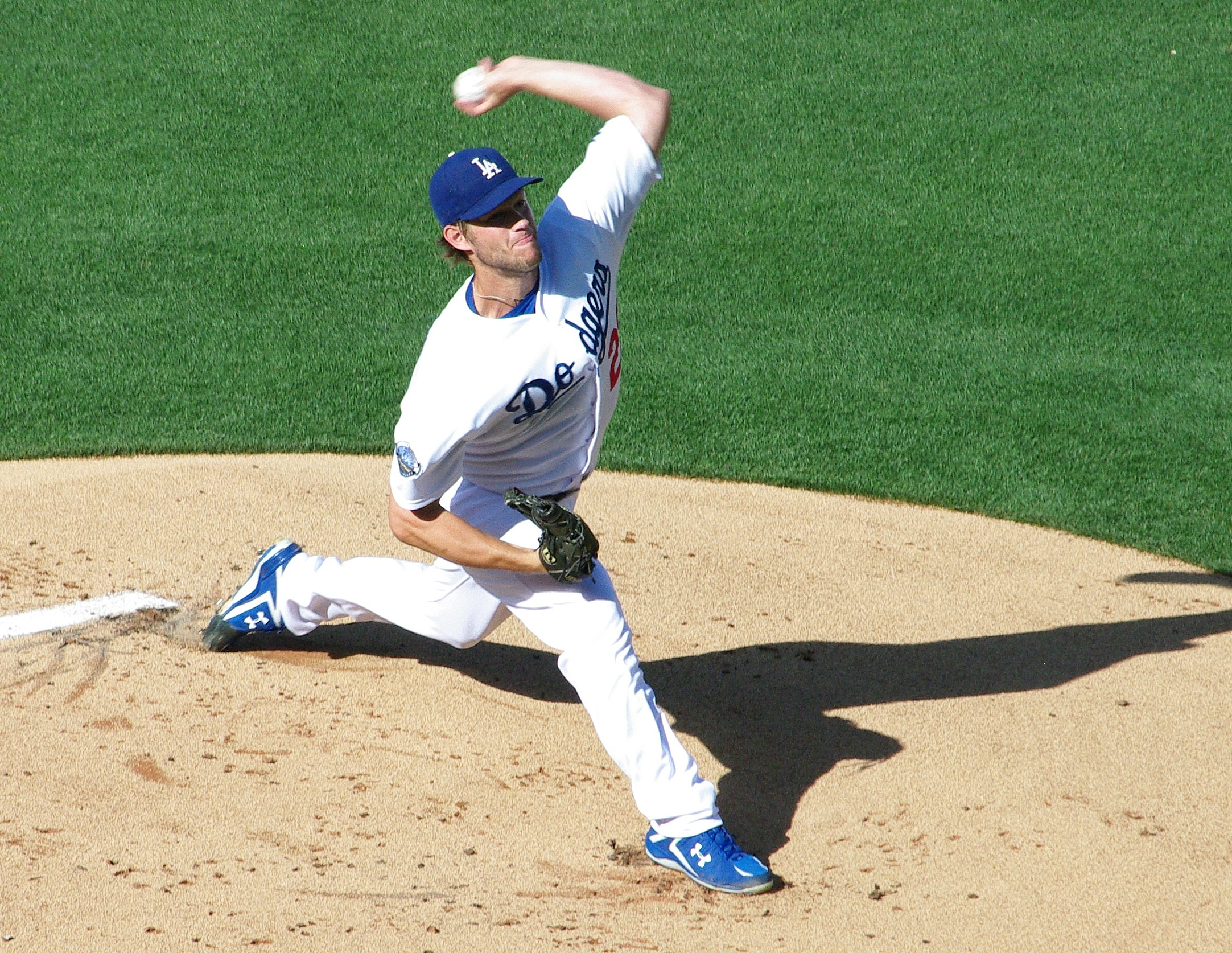
Kershaw's pitching delivery and stride

Kershaw relied on deception, movement, and changes in velocity. He hid the ball so that it was hard for the batter to pick up the ball, and he had a consistent overhand delivery on all of his pitches. He also consistently pitched low in the strike zone below the catcher's knees, causing batters to chase the ball even when it is going to hit the dirt. Out of the windup, Kershaw lowered his right foot vertically with a slight pause before moving it forward toward the plate. The motion was described during the 2015 National League Division Series as a "kickstand move," drawing a comparison with one setting a kickstand on a bicycle. Out of the stretch, he used a slide step as it made it difficult for a baserunner at first base to get a read on him. He has often said that he modeled his pitching mechanics after his favorite pitcher growing up, Roger Clemens.

Kershaw's repertoire included a four-seam fastball that sat anywhere from 91 miles per hour (146 km/h) to 95 miles per hour (153 km/h) and in his younger years topped out at 98 miles per hour (158 km/h) with arm-side movement, a slider from 84 miles per hour (135 km/h) to 90 miles per hour (140 km/h), a 12–6 curveball from 72 miles per hour (116 km/h) to 75 miles per hour (121 km/h), and a seldom-thrown changeup (under 3% usage). In the final seasons of his career, he also began to utilize a splitter and a two-seam fastball as a result of his diminishing velocity, as few of his pitches topped 90 miles per hour (140 km/h). He was known for having one of the better pickoff moves to first base and was generally considered one of the better fielding pitchers.

== Personal life ==
Kershaw with his wife and kids

Kershaw grew up in Highland Park, Texas, and attended school with quarterback Matthew Stafford. Stafford and Kershaw, who graduated from high school in 2006, were the highest-paid players in their leagues in 2017. One of Kershaw's favorite players growing up was former Texas Rangers first baseman Will Clark, and the main reason he wore number 22 was to honor Clark.

He is the great-nephew of astronomer Clyde Tombaugh, the discoverer of Pluto. His father, Christopher George Kershaw, was a musician and won a Clio Award for his work. The elder Kershaw remarried after his divorce from Marianne and died in 2013. His mother died in May 2023.

On December 4, 2010, Kershaw married his girlfriend of seven years, Ellen Melson. They have five children. During the season, they reside in Studio City, Los Angeles, and they live in University Park, Texas, during the offseason.

Kershaw is a Methodist with strong religious faith and shared his faith story in a 2012 video for the I Am Second series.

Kershaw made a cameo appearance in "Prince", a Season 3 episode of New Girl that originally aired following FOX's telecast of Super Bowl XLVIII.

Kershaw and his wife co-authored a book, Arise: Live Out Your Faith and Dreams on Whatever Field You Find Yourself, about their Christian faith and humanitarian efforts. It was published on January 10, 2012, by Regal Press.

=== Humanitarian work ===
Before the 2011 season, Kershaw visited Zambia with his wife as part of a Christian mission. After the trip, he announced his dream of building an orphanage in Lusaka, which he called "Hope's Home" after 11-year-old Hope, an HIV-positive child Kershaw met in Zambia. To accomplish his goal, Kershaw pledged a donation of $100 per strikeout recorded in 2011. With a then-career-high of 248 strikeouts thrown during the 2011 season, combined with additional donations through his Kershaw's Challenge organization, the initial $70,000 goal - later increased to $100,000 - was exceeded. When Kershaw won the 2011 Players Choice Award, he donated $260,000 to Hope's Home.

Kershaw and his wife returned to Zambia in 2012. He donated $100 for every strikeout in the 2012 season to Kershaw's Challenge, calling that season's incarnation of the project "Strike Out To Serve." Seventy percent of the money raised in 2012 went to Arise Africa, with 10 percent each going to the Peacock Foundation in Los Angeles, Mercy Street in Dallas, and I Am Second. In 2014, Kershaw continued to support the children of Zambia, in partnership with CURE International, raising funds to pay for 170 children's surgeries and new medical equipment for CURE hospital in Lusaka. Kershaw continued his partnership with CURE International in 2015, setting a goal of funding 100 surgeries for CURE's hospital in the Dominican Republic.

In December 2015, Kershaw participated in an expedition to Cuba composed of MLB players and officials, including former Dodgers manager Joe Torre. It was the first visit by MLB since 1999 and was anticipated as an important step to help normalize relations with the United States that had begun to ease earlier in the year.

Kershaw has also helped with other programs in Los Angeles, such as helping Habitat for Humanity demolish and rehabilitate a house in Lynwood, California. He is also a supporter of the Peacock Foundation, which provides animal-assisted interventions and activities for at-risk youth by partnering with mental health practitioners, public service agencies and community organizations.

Beginning in 2013, Kershaw and his wife have hosted “Ping Pong 4 Purpose,” a charity ping-pong tournament at Dodger Stadium. The tournament raised money for Kershaw's Challenge and featured past and present members of the Dodgers, high-profile celebrities, and team sponsors.

=== Controversies ===
In 2023, the Dodgers received backlash from Christian groups for inviting the Sisters of Perpetual Indulgence, an LGBT charity, to receive a "Community Hero Award" at their annual Pride Night event. Kershaw criticized the inclusion of the Sisters, saying their parodies were offensive to Christians. In response, he urged the Dodgers to speed up plans for "Christian Faith and Family Day", both promoting and hosting it. His decision to push for the event received criticism from the LGBT community.

During the Dodgers' Pride Night game in 2025, Kershaw wrote the Bible verse "Gen 9:12–16" on his Pride-themed cap, which attracted attention. (Note: That section of the Book of Genesis describes the Noahic covenant, which is symbolized by the rainbow. Per Alvin Garcia of the sports website Heavy, that portion of the Bible "is widely seen by conservative Christian groups as reclaiming the rainbow from LGBTQ+ symbolism".)

== Awards and honors ==
Awards received
Name of award	Times	Dates	Ref
Baseball America Major League Player of the Year	1	2014	
Branch Rickey Award	1	2013	
Cy Young Award	3	2011, 2013–14	
Gatorade National Player of the Year in baseball	1	2006	
Los Angeles Sports Council Sportsman of the Year	2	2011, 2014	
Major League Baseball All-Star	11	2011–17, 2019, 2022–23, 2025	
Marvin Miller Man of the Year Award	1	2014	
Midwest League Prospect of the Year	1	2007	
National League Most Valuable Player	1	2014	
National League Pitcher of the Month	7	2011, 2013, 2014 ×2, 2015, 2016, 2023	
National League Player of the Week	8	2011, 2012, 2013, 2014 ×2, 2015 ×2, 2017	
Player's Choice Award for National League Outstanding Pitcher (Voted on by MLB players)	3	2011, 2013–14	
Players Choice Awards for Player of the Year	1	2014	
Rawlings Gold Glove Award at pitcher	1	2011	
Roberto Clemente Award (Top humanitarian honor bestowed by MLB)	1	2012	
Roy Campanella Award (Leadership award voted on by Dodgers Players and Coaches )	2	2013–14	
The Sporting News Pitcher of the Year (Voted on by a panel of NL general managers (GM) and assistant GMs)	3	2011, 2013–14	
The Sporting News Player of the Year Award	1	2014	
Texas Professional Baseball Player of the Year Award	3	2009, 2011, 2014	
USA Today Baseball High School Player of the Year	1	2006	
Warren Spahn Award (Best left-handed pitcher in MLB)	4	2011, 2013–14, 2017	

== See also ==
- List of largest sports contracts
- List of Los Angeles Dodgers no-hitters
- List of Los Angeles Dodgers team records
- List of Major League Baseball All-Star Game records
- List of Major League Baseball annual ERA leaders
- List of Major League Baseball annual shutout leaders
- List of Major League Baseball annual strikeout leaders
- List of Major League Baseball annual wins leaders
- List of Major League Baseball career ERA leaders
- List of Major League Baseball career FIP leaders
- List of Major League Baseball career games started leaders
- List of Major League Baseball career strikeout leaders
- List of Major League Baseball career WAR leaders
- List of Major League Baseball career WHIP leaders
- List of Major League Baseball career wild pitches leaders
- List of Major League Baseball career wins leaders
- List of Major League Baseball postseason records
- List of Major League Baseball single-inning strikeout leaders
- List of Major League Baseball titles leaders
- List of Major League Baseball wins records
- List of World Series starting pitchers
- Los Angeles Dodgers award winners and league leaders

== Notes ==
Awards and achievements
Preceded by Vicente Padilla; Dustin May	Los Angeles Dodgers Opening Day; Starting pitcher 2011–2018; 2021	Succeeded by Hyun-jin Ryu; Walker Buehler
Preceded by Josh Beckett	No-hitter pitcher June 18, 2014	Succeeded by Tim Lincecum
Preceded by Cliff Lee; Adam Wainwright; Madison Bumgarner; Max Scherzer; Jake Arrieta; Yu Darvish	National League Pitcher of the Month; July 2011; July 2013; June–July 2014; July 2015; May 2016; April 2023	Succeeded by Cliff Lee; Zack Greinke; Madison Bumgarner; Jake Arrieta; Jon Lester; Michael Wacha
