= List of Los Angeles Dodgers team records =

The Los Angeles Dodgers are a Major League Baseball (MLB) team based in Los Angeles, California. The list of the Dodgers' team records includes batting and pitching records for both individual players and the team as a whole.

== Individual career records ==
Batting statistics; pitching statistics

Career batting records
Statistic	Player	Record	Dodgers career	Ref
Batting average	Willie Keeler	.352	1893; 1899–1902	
On-base percentage	Gary Sheffield	.424	1998–2001	
Slugging percentage	Gary Sheffield	.573	1998–2001	
On-base plus slugging	Gary Sheffield	.998	1998–2001	
Hits	Zack Wheat	2,804	1909–1926	
Total bases	Zack Wheat	4,003	1909–1926	
Singles	Zack Wheat	2,038	1909–1926	
Doubles	Zack Wheat	464	1909–1926	
Triples	Zack Wheat	171	1909–1926	
Home runs	Duke Snider	389	1947–1962	
RBI	Duke Snider	1,271	1947–1962	
Bases on balls	Pee Wee Reese	1,210	1940–1942; 1946–1958	
Strikeouts	Matt Kemp	1,179	2006–2014; 2018	
Stolen bases	Maury Wills	490	1959–1966; 1969–1972	

Career pitching records
Statistic	Player	Record	Dodgers career	Ref
Wins	Don Sutton	233	1966–1980; 1988	
Losses	Don Sutton	181	1966–1980; 1988	
Win–loss percentage	Zack Greinke	.773	2013–2015	
ERA	Zack Greinke	2.30	2013–2015	
Saves	Kenley Jansen	350	2010–2021	
Strikeouts	Clayton Kershaw	3,052	2008–2025	
Shutouts	Don Sutton	52	1966–1980; 1988	
Games	Kenley Jansen	701	2010–2021	
Innings	Don Sutton	3,816 1/3	1966–1980; 1988	
Games started	Don Sutton	533	1966–1980; 1988	
Complete games	Brickyard Kennedy	280	1892–1901	
Base on balls	Brickyard Kennedy	1,130	1892–1901	
Hits allowed	Don Sutton	3,291	1966–1980; 1988	
Wild pitches	Adonis Terry	165	1884–1891	
Hit batsmen	Don Drysdale	154	1956–1969	

== Individual single-season records ==
Batting statistics; pitching statistics; fielding statistics

Single-season batting records
Statistic	Player	Record	Season	Ref
Batting average	Babe Herman	.393	1930	
On-base percentage	Mike Griffin	.466	1894	
Slugging percentage	Babe Herman	.678	1930	
On-base plus slugging	Babe Herman	1.132	1930	
Hits	Babe Herman	241	1930	
Total bases	Babe Herman	416	1930	
Singles	Willie Keeler	190	1899	
Doubles	Freddie Freeman	59	2023	
Triples	George Treadway	26	1894	
Home runs	Shohei Ohtani	55	2025	
RBI	Tommy Davis	153	1962	
Base on balls	Eddie Stanky	148	1945	
Strikeouts	Teoscar Hernández	188	2024	
Stolen bases	Maury Wills	104	1962	

Single-season pitching records
Statistic	Player	Record	Season	Ref
Wins	Bob Caruthers	40	1889	
Losses	Adonis Terry	35	1884	
ERA	Rube Marquard	1.58	1916	
Saves	Éric Gagné	55	2003	
Strikeouts	Sandy Koufax	382	1965	
Games	Mike Marshall	106	1974	
Innings	Henry Porter	481 2/3	1885	
Starts	Adonis Terry	55	1884	
Complete games	Adonis Terry	54	1884	
Base on balls	Ed Stein	170	1894	
Hits allowed	Adonis Terry	486	1884	
Wild pitches	Sam Kimber	52	1884	
Hit batsmen	Joe McGinnity	40	1900	

Single-season fielding records
Statistic	Player	Record	Season	Ref
Putouts	Steve Garvey	1,606	1977	
Assists	Bill Russell	560	1973	
Double plays	Gil Hodges	171	1951	
Fielding percentage, infielder	Steve Garvey	.998	1976	
Fielding percentage, outfielder	Brett Butler	1.000*	1991	
Fielding percentage, outfielder	Brett Butler	1.000*	1993	
Errors	Bill Joyce	107	1891	

== Postseason ==
Career postseason batting records
Statistic	Player	Record	Seasons	Ref
Games played	Kiké Hernández	92	2015–2020; 2023–2025	
At Bats	Justin Turner	315	2014–2022	
Batting average (more than 30 games played)	Steve Garvey	.346	1974; 1977–1978; 1981	
On-base percentage (more than 30 games played)	Shohei Ohtani	.390	2024–2025	
Slugging percentage (more than 30 games played)	Duke Snider	.594	1949; 1952–1953; 1955-1956; 1959	
On-base plus slugging	Duke Snider	.945	1949; 1952–1953; 1955-1956; 1959	
Hits	Justin Turner	85	2014–2022	
Total bases	Justin Turner	145	2014–2022	
Singles	Justin Turner	52	2014–2022	
Doubles	Mookie Betts	19	2020–2025	
Triples	Five players tied (Cody Bellinger, Steve Garvey, Davey Lopes, Yasiel Puig, Bill Russell)	3		
Home runs	Max Muncy	16	2018–2020; 2022–2025	
RBI	Justin Turner	42	2014–2022	
Base on balls	Max Muncy	65	2018–2020; 2022–2025	
Strikeouts	Cody Bellinger	87	2017–2022	
Stolen bases	Davey Lopes	20	1974; 1977–1978; 1981	

Career postseason pitching records
Statistic	Player	Record	Seasons	Ref
Wins	Clayton Kershaw	13	2008–2009; 2013–2020; 2022–2023; 2025	
Losses	Clayton Kershaw	13	2008–2009; 2013–2020; 2022–2023; 2025	
Win–loss percentage (more than 5 games started)	Orel Hershiser	1.000	1985; 1988	
ERA (more than 50 innings pitched)	Sandy Koufax	0.95	1959; 1963; 1965–1966	
Saves	Kenley Jansen	19	2013–2021	
Strikeouts	Clayton Kershaw	213	2008–2009; 2013–2020; 2022–2023; 2025	
Shutouts	Two players tied (Orel Hershiser & Sandy Koufax)	2		
Games	Kenley Jansen	57	2013–2021	
Innings	Clayton Kershaw	196 2/3	2008–2009; 2013–2020; 2022–2023; 2025	
Games started	Clayton Kershaw	32	2008–2009; 2013–2020; 2022–2023; 2025	
Complete games	Two players tied (Orel Hershiser & Sandy Koufax)	4		
Base on balls	Clayton Kershaw	54	2008–2009; 2013–2020; 2022–2023; 2025	
Hits allowed	Clayton Kershaw	171	2008–2009; 2013–2020; 2022–2023; 2025	
Wild pitches	Clayton Kershaw	11	2008–2009; 2013–2020; 2022–2023; 2025	
Hit batsmen	Three players tied (Brent Honeywell Jr., Clayton Kershaw, Yoshinobu Yamamoto)	4		

== Team season records ==
- Games: 165 (1962)
- Wins: 111 (2022)
- Losses: 104 (1905)
- Highest Winning Percentage: .717 (2020)
- Lowest Winning Percentage: .316 (1905)

=== Batting records ===
- Batting Average: .313 (1894)
- Hits: 1654 (1930)
- Singles: 1223 (1925)
- Runs: 1021 (1894)
- Doubles: 306 (2017)
- Triples: 130 (1894)
- Stolen Bases: 409 (1892)
- Home Runs: 279 (2019)
- Grand Slams: 10 (2004)
- Pinch-Homers: 12 (2000)
- Runs Batted In: 891 (2019)
- Total Bases: 2593 (2019)
- Extra-Base Hits: 541 (1953)
- Slugging Percent: .483 (2020)
- On-Base Percent: .378 (1894)
- Hit by Pitch: 125 (1899)
- Left On Base: 1278 (1947)
- Walks: 732 (1947)
- Intentional Bases on Balls: 91 (1956)
- Most Strikeouts: 1436 (2018)
- Fewest Strikeouts: 318 (1922)

=== Pitching records ===
- Saves: 58 (2003)
- Complete Games: 135 (1904)
- Most Innings Pitched: 1491 (1973)
- Most Runs Allowed: 1007 (1894)
- Fewest Runs Allowed: 463 (1918)
- Most Earned Runs Allowed: 743 (1929)
- Fewest Earned Runs Allowed: 336 (1916)
- Most Hits Allowed: 1608 (1925)
- Fewest Hits Allowed: 1024 (1918)
- Fewest Walks Allowed: 258 (1919)
- Most Walks Allowed: 671 (1946)
- Most Strikeouts: 1232 (1997)
- Fewest Strikeouts: 216 (1895)
- Most Shutouts: 24 (1963, 1988)
- Lowest Earned Run Average: 2.12 (1916)
- Most Wild Pitches: 70 (1894, 1958)
- Most Homers Allowed: 192 (1999)
- Fewest Homers Allowed: 10 (1902)
- Most Hit Batters: 75 (2000)
- Most Balks: 30 (1988)

=== Fielding records ===
- Highest Fielding Percent: .988 (2004)
- Lowest Fielding Percent: .924 (1891)
- Most Putouts: 4480 (2005)
- Fewest Putouts: 3992 (1938)
- Most Assists: 1946 (1982)
- Fewest Assists: 1573 (1961)
- Most Total Chances: 6550 (1982)
- Fewest Total Chances: 5845 (1938)
- Most Errors: 432 (1891)
- Fewest Errors: 73 (2004)
- Most Double Plays: 198 (1958)
- Fewest Double Plays: 73 (1891, 1906)
- Fewest Passed Balls: 4 (1933, 1951, 1953, 1954)
- Most Consecutive Errorless Games: 11 (May 5–16, 1979)

== See also ==
- List of Major League Baseball franchise postseason streaks
- Los Angeles Dodgers award winners and league leaders
