= Major League Baseball All-Star Game =

Mid-summer MLB baseball game

Major League Baseball All-Star Game Midsummer Classic
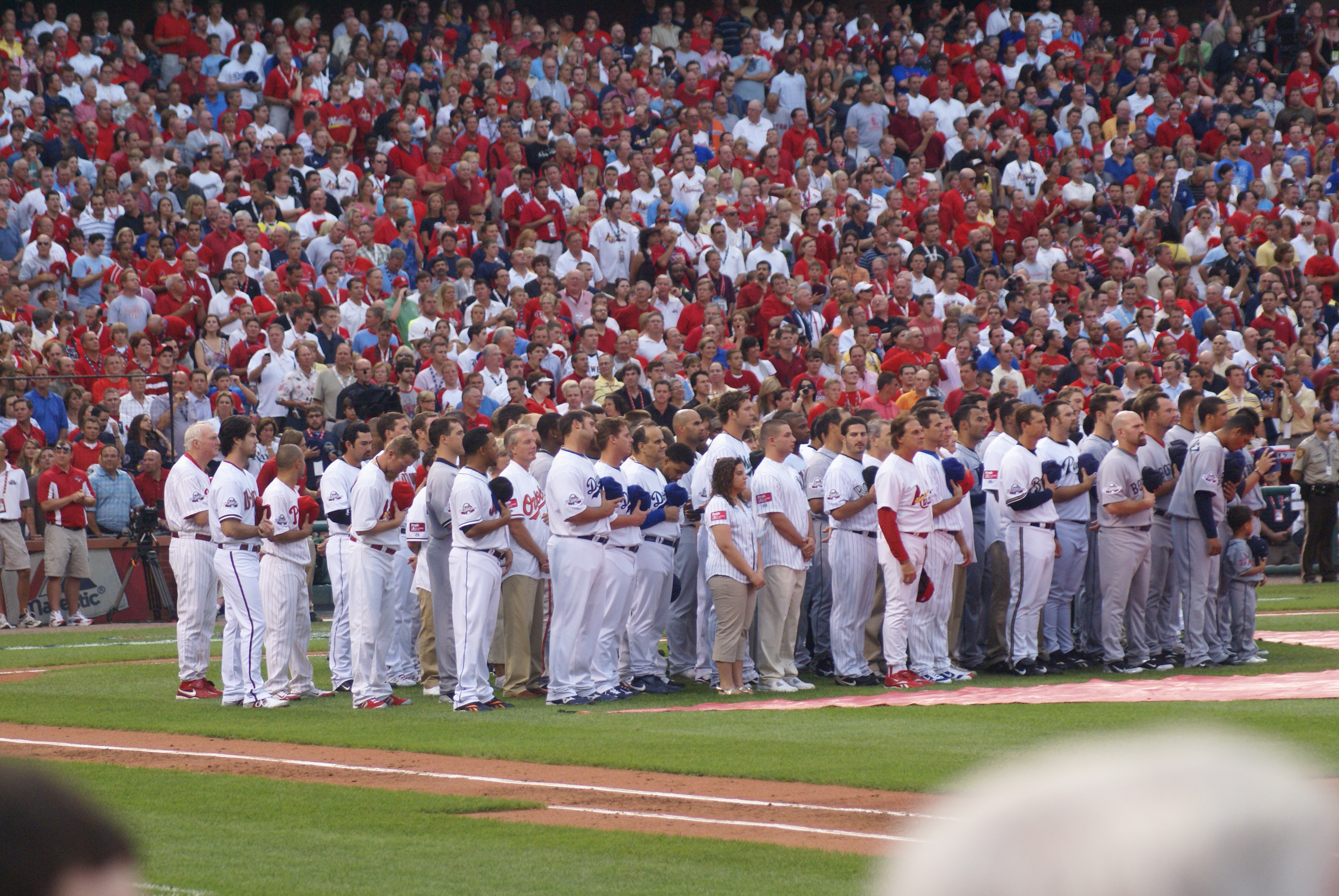
- 2009 Major League Baseball All-Star Game in St. Louis
- Frequency: Annual
- Location: Varies
- Inaugurated: 1933
- Previous event: July 14, 2026 (Citizens Bank Park, Philadelphia, Pennsylvania)
- Next event: July 13, 2027 (Wrigley Field, Chicago, Illinois)
- Participants: American League; National League
- Organizer: Major League Baseball

The Major League Baseball All-Star Game, also known as the "Midsummer Classic", is an annual professional baseball game sanctioned by Major League Baseball (MLB) and contested between the all-stars from the American League (AL) and National League (NL). Starting position players and designated hitters are selected by fans, pitchers are selected by managers, and reserves are selected by players and managers.

The game is usually played on the second or third Tuesday in July, and is meant to mark the symbolic halfway point of the MLB season (though not the mathematical halfway point, which usually falls several weeks earlier). Both leagues share an All-Star break, with no regular-season games scheduled from the day before through two days after the All-Star Game, with the exception of a single Thursday night game starting in the 2018 season. Some additional events and festivities associated with the game take place each year close to and during this break in the regular season.

No official MLB All-Star Games were held in 1945 and 2020, and no official selection of players took place, due to World War II travel restrictions and the COVID-19 pandemic, respectively. Two All-Star Games were held each season from 1959 to 1962. The most recent All-Star Game was held on July 14, 2026, at Citizens Bank Park in Philadelphia, home of the NL's Philadelphia Phillies.

== History ==
The earliest antecedent of the baseball all-star game was the "Great Base Ball Match of 1858", which pitted the premier amateur players of New York against rival stars from Brooklyn in front of a paying crowd.

In the early 20th century, baseball teams put on benefit games for the families of players or former players who died unexpectedly. The Addie Joss Benefit Game hosted by the Cleveland Naps in July 1911 raised $12,914 for the Joss family ($446,225 in 2025). In September 1917, the Tim Murnane Benefit Game hosted by the Boston Red Sox raised from $13,000 ($326,688 in 2025) to $15,000 ($376,948 in 2025) for Murnane's family.

The first All-Star Game was held on July 6, 1933, at Comiskey Park in Chicago as part of the 1933 World's Fair, and was initiated by Arch Ward, then sports editor for the Chicago Tribune, and supported by American League president Will Harridge, who lobbied baseball executives to create the event. Initially intended to be a one-time event, its success resulted in making the contest an annual one.

From 1959 to 1962, two All-Star Games were held each season, in order to increase the money going to the players' pension fund. This practice ended after the owners agreed to give the players a larger share of the income from a single game.

According to the Baseball Database provided by Sean Lahman, a total of 2,076 individual players have been selected for an All-Star game between 1933 and 2026.

== Venues ==
MLB chooses the venue for the All-Star Game. The criteria for venue selection are subjective; generally, cities with new ballparks and those who have not hosted the Game in many years – or ever – tend to get selected. Over time, this has resulted in certain cities being selected to host more often than others. Cleveland Stadium and the original Yankee Stadium have each hosted four All-Star Games, the most of any venue, and New York City has hosted more Games than any other city, having done so nine times in five different stadiums. At the same time, the New York Mets did not host for 48 seasons (1965–2012), while the Los Angeles Dodgers did not host for 42 years, (1980–2022). (The Dodgers were scheduled to host the 2020 Major League Baseball All-Star Game before it was canceled by the COVID-19 pandemic.) The Tampa Bay Rays are currently the only club yet to host an All-Star Game, and one team hasn't hosted the All-Star Game at their current stadium: The New York Yankees at Yankee Stadium. Three teams have won the World Series in the same year their stadium hosted the All-Star Game: the 1939 New York Yankees, the 1959 Los Angeles Dodgers, and the 1977 New York Yankees. (Note: Additionally, the 2020 Los Angeles Dodgers and the 2021 Atlanta Braves won the World Series in those years and were originally scheduled to host the All-Star Game before the 2020 game was rescheduled to 2022 and the 2021 game was relocated to Denver.)

The venues traditionally alternated between the American and National Leagues every year, with an AL team hosting in an odd-numbered year and an NL club hosting in an even-numbered year. This tradition has been broken several times; the first time was in 1951, when the AL's Detroit Tigers hosted the game as part of the city's 250th birthday (corrected by the NL hosting the next two seasons). The second was when the two-game format from 1959 to 1962 resulted in the AL being one game ahead in turn. The NL hosted two consecutive games in 2006 and 2007 (Pittsburgh and San Francisco), and in 2021 and 2022 (in Denver and in Los Angeles). The NL also hosted four straight games from 2015 to 2018 (in Cincinnati, San Diego, Miami, and Washington). The AL hosted two consecutive games in 2023 and 2024 (in Seattle and in Arlington, Texas), and the NL did so again in 2025 and 2026 (in Atlanta and in Philadelphia).

During the first two decades of the Game's history, there were two pairs of teams that shared ballparks. In Philadelphia, the AL's Athletics and NL's Phillies both played at Shibe Park, and in St. Louis, the AL's Browns and NL's Cardinals shared Sportsman's Park. This led to some shorter-than-usual gaps between All-Star Games played at the same venue; Sportsman's Park hosted the All-Star Game twice in eight years (the Cardinals hosted in 1940 and the Browns in 1948), while Shibe Park was the All-Star venue twice in nine years (the Athletics hosted in 1943 and the Phillies in 1952).

The "home team" has traditionally been the league in which the host franchise plays its games. The lone exception has been the 2016 Game in which the AL was the "home" team, despite its being played in Petco Park, home of the NL's San Diego Padres. This was announced after the 2017 All-Star Game was awarded to Miami, marking a third straight game hosted at an NL venue. This was done because, from 2003 to 2016, the league who won the All-Star Game was given home field advantage in the World Series, and MLB did not want to allow the NL to have the last at-bat in an All-Star Game for three straight years. MLB ended this practice in 2017, and the All-Star Game reverted to having the host team's league serve as the home team.

== All-star team rosters ==
=== Selection of managers and coaches ===
Since 1934, the managers of the game are the managers of the previous year's league pennant winners and World Series clubs.

The coaching staff for each team is selected by its manager. This honor is given to the manager, not the team, so it is possible that the All-Star manager could no longer be with the team with which he won. This happened in 2003, when Dusty Baker managed the National League team despite having moved from the National League champion San Francisco Giants to the Chicago Cubs. This has also included situations where the person is no longer actively managing a team. For the first All-Star Game, intended as a one-time event, Connie Mack and John McGraw were regarded as baseball's venerable managers, and were asked to lead the American and National League teams, respectively. McGraw came out of retirement for that purpose. Dick Williams resigned after managing the Oakland Athletics to the 1973 World Series. In 1974, he became manager of the California Angels, whose uniform he wore for the game. Tony La Russa, who managed the World Series champion St. Louis Cardinals in 2011, and retired after the season, came back to manage the National League in 2012.

In 1979, Bob Lemon managed the American League team after having been fired by New York Yankees owner George Steinbrenner. Lemon led the Yankees to the 1981 World Series but did not make it to the '82 All-Star Game as manager after again being fired by Steinbrenner, so Billy Martin, skipper of the 1981 AL runner-up Oakland Athletics, led the All-Star squad.

There have been some exceptional cases where the usual rule was abandoned. After the 1964 season and the World Series, the managers, Johnny Keane of the St. Louis Cardinals and Yogi Berra of the New York Yankees, both left their teams and found new jobs in the other league: Keane was hired to manage the Yankees, and Berra became a player-coach with the New York Mets. The Philadelphia Phillies and Cincinnati Reds had finished in a second-place tie in the NL; the Chicago White Sox had finished second in the AL. Cincinnati's manager, Fred Hutchinson, had died in the off-season, so Gene Mauch of the Phillies and Al López of the White Sox were chosen to be the managers for the 1965 All-Star Game. The rule may have been abandoned again in 2020, as the manager of the 2019 American League champion Houston Astros, A. J. Hinch, was suspended for the 2020 season (and subsequently fired by the Astros) for his role in the Astros' scandal involving the usage of video to steal signs; however the game was canceled due to the COVID-19 pandemic.

Because of the season-ending 1994–95 MLBPA strike where the season was abandoned without official league champions, the 1995 game featured the "unofficial" league champions, the managers of the clubs leading their respective leagues' won-loss records, Buck Showalter of the New York Yankees and Felipe Alou of the Montreal Expos for the All-Star Game.

=== Selection of players ===
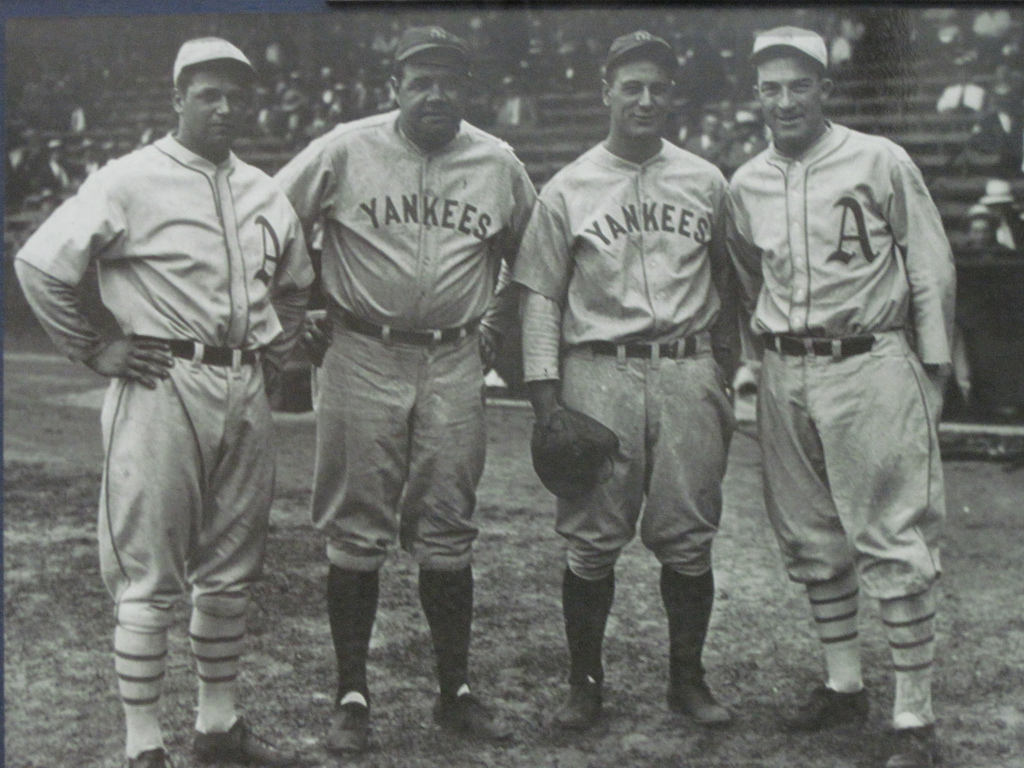
1933 AL All-Stars – Jimmie Foxx, Babe Ruth, Lou Gehrig, and Al Simmons

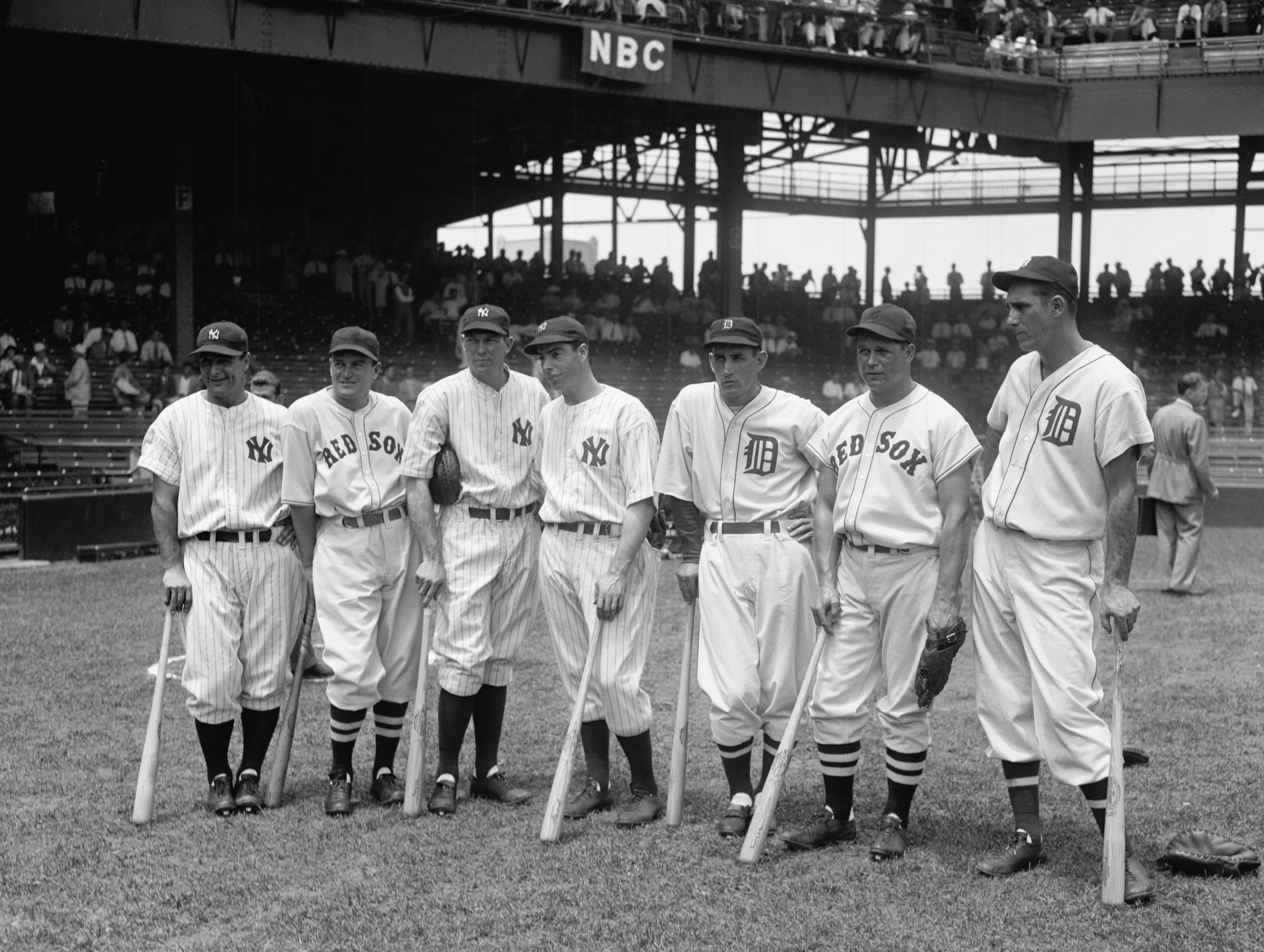
1937 AL All-Stars – Lou Gehrig, Joe Cronin, Bill Dickey, Joe DiMaggio, Charlie Gehringer, Jimmie Foxx, and Hank Greenberg

The All-Star Game roster size for each league was 18 in 1933, 20 from 1934 to 1938, 25 from 1939 to 1981, 30 from 1982 to 2002, 32 from 2003 to 2008, 33 in 2009, and since 2010, there have been 34 players on each league's team roster.

One continuing controversy of the player selection process is the rule that each team has to have at least one representative on its league's All-Star roster.

On April 29, 2010, MLB announced several rules changes for future All-Star games, effective with the 2010 edition.

- Rosters were expanded by one extra position player, to a total of 34.
- The designated hitter will be used in all games, even in National League ballparks. (This became moot when the NL adopted the DH in 2022.)
- Pitchers who start on the Sunday before the game break will be replaced on the roster, but will still be recognized as All-Stars.
- Each manager may designate a position player who will be eligible for game re-entry if the last position player is injured or ejected. This is in addition to a rule that allows a player to re-enter to replace an injured or ejected catcher.

The AL and NL All-Stars are selected through the following process:

- Fan voting (nine N.L. players; nine A.L. players): Baseball fans vote on the starting position players for the All-Star Game, with ballots formerly distributed at Major League Baseball games before mid-season and, as of 2015, exclusively on the Internet. Since 2022, fans can vote for the designated hitter on both leagues; prior to that, only the AL designated hitter can be voted in, while the NL designated hitter must be selected by the manager. Fan voting has been recently criticized because most of the starting players can come from teams that have large fan bases or passionate fan bases such as the Kansas City Royals and the Chicago Cubs.
- Player voting (16 players): Eight pitchers (five starters and three relievers) and one back-up player for each position are elected by the players, coaches, and managers. If the top vote-getter at a position has also been selected via fan voting, the second-place finisher in this category is selected.
- Manager selection (eight N.L. players; eight A.L. players): The manager of each league's All-Star team – in consultation with the other managers in his league and the Commissioner's Office – will fill his team's roster up to 33 players. Prior to 2022, the NL manager had the power to select his team's designated hitter; this is no longer applicable after the NL adopted the designated hitter and fans are allowed to vote for that league's starting DH. At this point, it is ensured that every team is represented by at least one player.
- Final vote (one player): After the list of 33 players for each league is announced, fans vote for one additional player, chosen from a list of five players that is compiled by the manager of each league's team and the Commissioner's Office. This concluded in 2018.
- Replacements: After the roster is selected, the All-Star manager and the Commissioner's Office will replace players who are injured, decline to participate, and pitchers who started on the Sunday before the game.

==== All-Star uniforms ====
Since the first game, American League players have worn their respective team uniforms rather than wearing uniforms made specifically for the game, while National League players waited until the second game to do this. In the first game, the National League All-Star Team wore gray uniforms with navy blue letters spelling "NATIONAL LEAGUE" across the front of the jersey with "NL" caps.

Game-specific uniforms are made every year, but are not worn for the game itself. Instead these uniforms were worn during batting practice and the Home Run Derby. From the 2021 to the 2024 games, Major League Baseball and Nike released new All-Star Game uniforms annually, and these uniforms would be worn by the players during the game. Starting with the 2025 game, however, MLB reverted to wearing team uniforms at the All-Star Game.

==== All-Star caps ====
Starting with the 2014 All-Star Game, players began to wear special All-Star Game caps. For the workout, batting practice and Home Run Derby contest, players started using one type of cap with colors corresponding the league. For the All-Star Game day, players started wearing a cap with the team's logo on front and the All-Star Game logo on the right side.

=== History of player selection methods ===
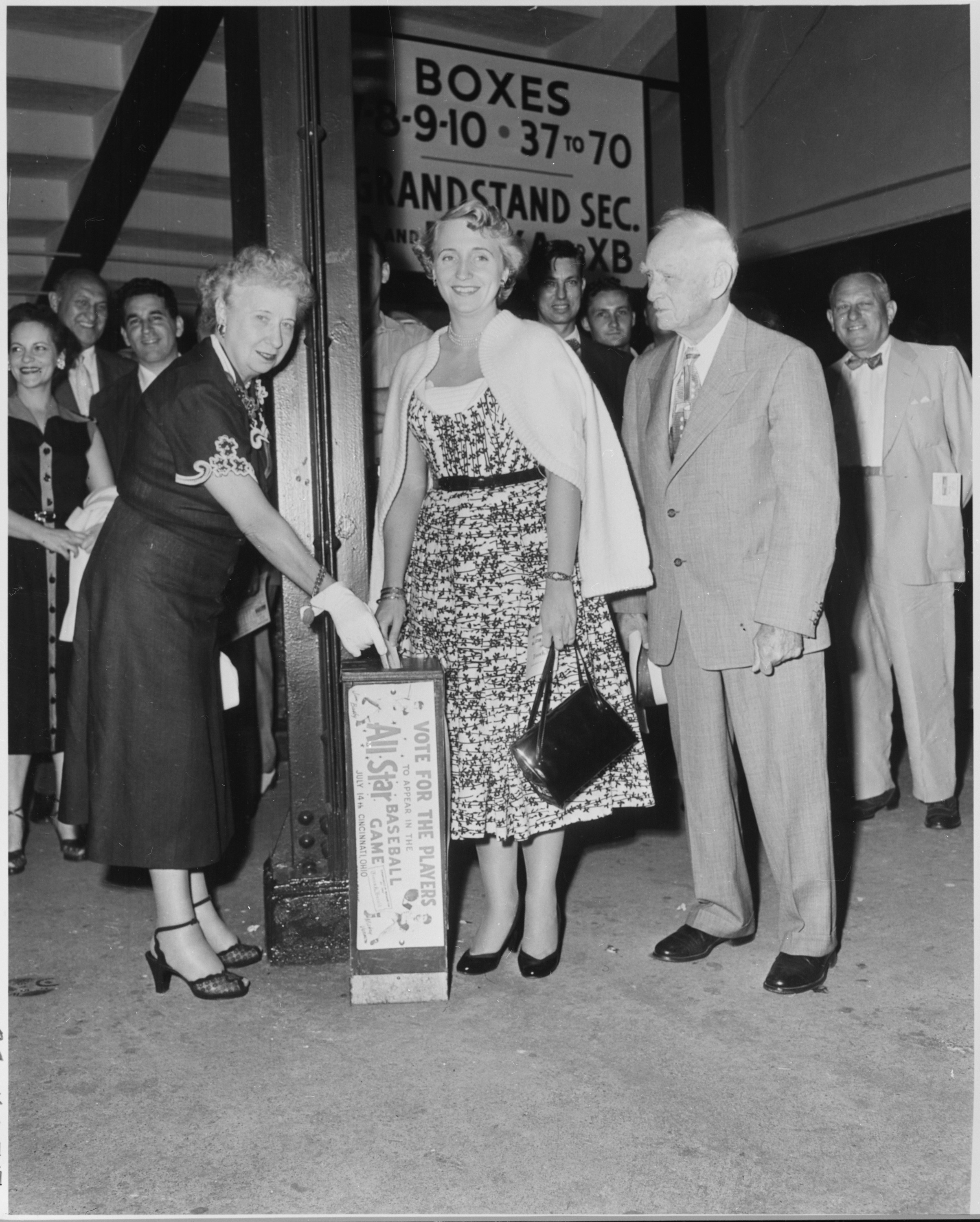
Bess and Margaret Truman submitting their ballots for the 1953 Major League Baseball All-Star Game rosters

In 1933 and 1934, the fans selected the 18 starters for the game and the managers chose the rest of the teams' players. From 1935 through 1944 and in 1946, the manager of each All-Star squad selected the entire team; in 1945, no MLB All-Star Game was held, and no All-Stars were officially named.

In 1947, fans were given the opportunity to vote on the eight starting position players, but in 1957, fans of the Cincinnati Reds stuffed the ballot box (see below), and elected a Red to every position except first base. Commissioner Ford Frick stepped in and removed two Reds from the lineup. As a response to this unfairness, fan voting was discontinued; players, coaches, and managers were given the sole authority to elect starting position players, for the next dozen years.

Between the lack of fan input and over-exposure due to the double All-Star games in 1959–1962, interest in the game was thought to be waning. As part of the rise of the MLB Promotion Corporation's attempts to modernize marketing of baseball, fan balloting for the starting eight was restored for the 1970 game.

Sometime in the 1960s, the distinction between left-fielder, center-fielder, and right-fielder was dropped, and it was provided that the top three vote-getters in the outfield category would start regardless of position. Oft-heard remarks prior to this time included ones such as "If you had Clemente, you couldn't have Aaron", and so on.

Rico Carty was the first player ever selected to an All-Star team as a write-in candidate by fans, in 1970, the first year that voting was given back to the fans. Steve Garvey was the second player ever selected to an All-Star team as a write-in candidate by fans, in 1974. He was later the Most Valuable Player of that game as well as the National League MVP for that year.

From 2002 to 2018, the final roster selection has been made by the public via the All-Star Final Vote.

Until 2003, reserves and pitchers were chosen by the manager. Player voting was re-introduced in 2003 after the managers were criticized for picking players from their own team over more deserving players from other teams. This was particularly evident in 2002, when National League manager Bob Brenly selected his own catcher, Damian Miller, over the more deserving Paul Lo Duca; while American League manager Joe Torre selected his own third baseman, Robin Ventura, over the Oakland Athletics' Gold Glove and Silver Slugger-winning third baseman Eric Chavez.

Before the 2009 game, Major League Baseball announced that an additional pitcher would be added to each roster, bringing the total for each league to 33 players. The following year, MLB announced that an extra position player would be added to each roster for the 2010 game and beyond, bringing the total to 34 for each league.

One continuing controversy of the player selection process is the rule that each team has to have at least one representative on its league's All-Star roster. Supporters of the rule point out that this prevents the large-market teams from totally dominating the squad, and keeps fan and media interest in the game, as fans would not be interested in the game if their team did not have any players involved. Opponents of the rule contend that the purpose of the game is to spotlight Major League Baseball's best players, and that some players from stronger teams are left off the roster in favor of possibly less deserving players from weaker teams.

Both these arguments were strengthened by the greater urgency of winning the game, due to the former rule that the winning league attains home field advantage in the World Series. A number of compromises were suggested in the sports/news media as measures to mitigate these selection issues, including limiting the number of representatives a particular team could have; or requiring only that a certain percentage of the 30 teams be represented; or expanding the size of the All-Star rosters.

The only exception is if a team trades its lone All-Star before the game; in this case, its league's All-Star Game manager is not required to include another player from that team.

=== Stuffing the ballot box ===
In 1957, Cincinnati Reds fans stuffed the ballot box and elected seven Reds players to start in the All-Star Game: Johnny Temple (2B), Roy McMillan (SS), Don Hoak (3B), Ed Bailey (C), Frank Robinson (LF), Gus Bell (CF), and Wally Post (RF), and the only non-Red elected to start for the National League was St. Louis Cardinals first baseman Stan Musial. While the Reds were a good offensive team, most baseball observers agreed that they did not deserve seven starters in the All-Star Game. An investigation ordered by Commissioner Ford Frick showed that over half of the ballots cast came from Cincinnati, as the Cincinnati Enquirer had printed up pre-marked ballots and distributed them with the Sunday newspaper to make it easy for Reds fans to vote often for their favorite stars. Commissioner Ford Frick appointed Willie Mays of the New York Giants and Hank Aaron of the Milwaukee Braves to substitute for Reds players Gus Bell and Wally Post, and took fan voting rights away in future games; Bell was kept as a reserve, while Post was injured and would have been unable to play in any event.

Managers, players, and coaches picked the entire team until 1969, when the vote for starters again returned to the fans. To prevent a repeat of this incident, from 1970 until the start of internet voting, each team has been given the same number of ballots to hand out. In 1998, that number was roughly 400,000 ballots.

The 1988 Game was surrounded by tacit accusations against Oakland Athletics fans of stuffing the ballot box in favor of catcher Terry Steinbach, whose qualifications as a starter were questioned by some sportswriters. Steinbach wound up being named the game's Most Valuable Player, hitting a home run and a sacrifice fly to get both RBIs in a 2–1 win.

Since the dawn of the internet age, online voting has again led to ballot stuffing. In 1999, Chris Nandor, a Red Sox fan, utilized a simple computer program to vote for Nomar Garciaparra over 39,000 times. Upon discovery, MLB rejected the votes.

In 2015, Kansas City Royals fans were accused of stuffing the ballot box when eight of their players (Salvador Pérez, Lorenzo Cain, Mike Moustakas, Alcides Escobar, Eric Hosmer, Kendrys Morales, Alex Gordon, and Omar Infante) were leading the ballots at their respective positions before the final tally was taken. Had this result stood, the only non-Royal in the American League's starting lineup would have been Los Angeles Angels of Anaheim player Mike Trout. This also would have been a record for the most players from one team starting in the All-Star game. However, after MLB cancelled 65 million votes deemed to be fraudulent, the final starting roster included only Salvador Pérez, Lorenzo Cain, Alcides Escobar, and Alex Gordon (Gordon would be replaced due to injury). The only other Royals to make the final lineup were Mike Moustakas, Kelvin Herrera and Wade Davis; Moustakas as the winner of the AL All-Star Final Vote while Herrera and Davis, both pitchers, were chosen through either Player Ballots or by Royals and AL Manager, Ned Yost.

=== Designated hitter ===
In 1989, a designated hitter was allowed in the All-Star Game for the first time. Between 1989 and 2010, the designated hitter rule was applied based on the league in which the host team plays; it was used for games played in American League ballparks – in each such instance, both teams used a designated hitter – while in National League ballparks, managers have scheduled the pitcher to hit, though pinch hitters have almost always been used in practice. This allows a deserving nonstarter to make a plate appearance. In 2010, Major League Baseball announced the designated hitter rule would apply for every All-Star Game; while the 2010 game was already to have the DH, the 2011 game was the first played in a National League park with a DH.

== All-Star Game MVP Award ==
The All-Star Game Most Valuable Player Award is presented annually to the most outstanding player of each season's All-Star Game. Presented each year beginning in 1962 (two games were held in 1962 and an award was presented for each game), the MVP award was originally called the Arch Ward Memorial Award, after the man who came up with the concept of the All-Star Game in 1933. In 1970, the name was changed to the Commissioner's Trophy (two NL players were presented the award in 1975); however, the name change was reversed in 1985, so that the World Series Trophy (first awarded in 1967) could be renamed the Commissioner's Trophy. In 2002, the trophy itself retained its eponym, while the award itself was dedicated as The Ted Williams Most Valuable Player Award, in honor of former Boston Red Sox player Ted Williams, who had died earlier that year.

== Tie games, rain delays, and home-field advantage in World Series ==
The first tie in an All-Star Game occurred on July 31, 1961 at Fenway Park in Boston when the game was called at 1–1 after nine innings due to rain; the only other rain-shortened game was in 1952, but the National League defeated the American League, 3–2 in five innings.

The 2002 All-Star Game, held in Milwaukee, ended in controversy in the 11th inning when both teams ran out of substitute players available to pitch in relief. At that point, Commissioner Bud Selig (a Milwaukee native and former owner of the Brewers) declared that the game would end after 11 innings, and it ended in a 7–all tie. The crowd booed and threw beer bottles onto the field, and the media were highly critical of this unsatisfactory conclusion.

To provide additional incentive for victory, Major League Baseball reached an agreement with the players union to award home-field advantage for the World Series to the champion of the league that won the All-Star Game, for 2003 and 2004. The agreement was extended for both 2005 and 2006, and it remained in place through-and-including the 2016 game. Since 2017, home-field advantage has been awarded to the World Series team having the better regular season record.

Previously, home-field advantage in the World Series alternated between the two leagues each year. The American League took advantage of the new rule in each of its first seven years: between 2003 and 2009, the American League won four Series and the National League won three. The National League champion benefited from this rule for the first time in 2010.

Even with this rule in effect, there was no guarantee that a repeat of the 2002 situation would not occur; to avoid future ties due to lack of available players, managers have been instructed to (and have voluntarily) hold back a few select position players and pitchers. This has resulted in some fan dissatisfaction and controversy when these players are never actually used in the game, such as Tim Wakefield in the 2009 All-Star Game. Such a move has resulted in calls to allow limited re-entry of players who have been replaced during the game (in addition to catchers, which is already allowed), thereby giving the freedom to use all the players on the roster without leaving teams with the situation where no players are available, as was the case in 2002. Since 2010, each league's manager is allowed to designate one position player who can re-enter the game to replace an injured or ejected player at any position, in addition to the existing rule covering catchers. The change to a home run swing-off in the event of a tie after nine innings starting in 2022 eliminates these concerns, as the games are now guaranteed to only last the nine standard innings at most, hence managers no longer need to hold back players with potential extra innings in mind and can make lineup plans that involve everyone voted into the game to be used at some point.

A tie game could have also been deemed a "suspended game" in which case it would have ended tied if no make-up date was scheduled, but it would be extremely difficult to find such a make-up date in any event as Major League Baseball would have to postpone one or more days of the regular season and/or schedule the make-up date on a travel day during the postseason, the latter which would be unfair to teams involved in the upcoming series. Since 2012, there have been off days for all teams on the Wednesday and Thursday after the All-Star Game, and if necessary, the game could have been finished in the morning or afternoon on Wednesday/Thursday if the situation warranted it.

Furthermore, various writers have stated that home-field advantage in the World Series should be decided based on the regular season records of the participants, not on an exhibition game such as the All-Star Game played several months earlier. Some writers especially questioned the integrity of this rule after the 2014 All-Star Game, when St. Louis Cardinals pitcher Adam Wainwright suggested that he intentionally gave Derek Jeter some easy pitches to hit in the New York Yankees' shortstop's final All-Star appearance before he retired at the end of that season.

In 2019 and 2021, any All-Star games that ended up tied after regulation would have had each extra inning start with a runner placed on second base to begin each half inning (a rule later used in the regular season since 2020). However, both the 2019 and 2021 All-Star games were decided in regulation and the 2020 game was canceled due to the COVID-19 pandemic, making the rule moot.

Since 2022, any All-Star game ending in a tie after 9 regulation innings will result in teams battling in a best-of-three-round Home Run Derby-style "swing-off" competition. Three players are chosen by managers to determine who will bat. Each player gets three swings. Whoever hits the most homers in the three rounds will win it; otherwise, teams play sudden-death triple-swing rounds until one team out-slugs the other. Under this rule, extra innings are abolished. The game would go into the record book as a tie, with a notation made as to which league won the swing-off (which would be recorded as such in the head to head record), with no winning nor losing pitcher. The rule was first used in the 2025 All-Star Game, when the game was tied at 6–6 after nine innings. The National League defeated the American League in the swing-off, 4–3.

== Winning streaks, run totals, longest games ==
Ninety-three All-Star Games have been played (including two games per year from 1959–1962), with the AL leading 48–45–2. The All-Star Game has seen several "eras" in which one league tended to dominate. From 1933 to 1949, the American League won 12 of the first 16. The National League dominated from 1950 to 1987, going 33–8–1. This included a stretch from 1963 to 1982 when it won 19 of 20, including 11 in a row from 1972 to 1982. Since 1988, the American League has dominated, going 28–8–1, including a 13-game unbeaten streak (12–0–1) from 1997 to 2009.

The AL has a 394–386 run advantage overall.

The longest All-Star Game, in terms of innings, lasted 15 innings, which has occurred twice: 1967 and 2008; the latter of which was the longest game, with a total time of four hours and 50 minutes.

== All-Star Game scheduling ==
Except for 1983, the All-Star Game has been scheduled on a Tuesday in July since 1963. In that year, in order to observe the 50-year anniversary of the first All-Star Game, the game was held on a Wednesday night, July 6, fifty years to the day of the first such event (July 6, 1933), at the same venue, Chicago's Comiskey Park.

There have been two All-Star Games scheduled on Tuesday that were subsequently moved during the season.

- In 1969, the game was rained out and moved to Wednesday afternoon, July 23 (making it the last afternoon game).
- In 1981, it was moved to Sunday, August 9, because of the MLB players' strike. This was the only game to be played on a weekend, and the most recent game not held in the month of July.

The game was played at night for the first time in 1942, at the Polo Grounds, located in New York City. Since 1970, every All-Star Game has been played under the lights, though when held at venues near enough to the west coast, the game starts in daylight in the late afternoon.

Twice, the MLB All-Star Game has been deferred because of travel restrictions. In 1945, severe wartime travel restrictions in effect led to the game scheduled to be played at Boston's Fenway Park being deferred to the next season. In 2020, severe pandemic restrictions for MLB teams, including prohibiting teams from playing outside their divisions, the game scheduled to be played at Los Angeles' Dodger Stadium was deferred to 2022.

There were two All-Star Games played each season from 1959 through 1962. The second game was added to raise money for the MLB players' pension funds, as well as other causes, but the experiment was later abandoned on the grounds that having two games watered down the appeal of the event.

In 1981, the game was moved from July to August, after the middle portion of the 1981 season, including the scheduled All-Star break, had been erased by the MLB players' strike. The game (in Cleveland) was moved from its original July date to August 9. The season would resume in a split season format, second-half regular-season play began the next afternoon with a game in Wrigley Field in Chicago.

The 2021 All-Star Game was held in Denver, home of the NL's Colorado Rockies, as MLB moved the 2021 game from Atlanta in response to a recently passed Georgia election law, stating "Major League Baseball fundamentally supports voting rights for all Americans and opposes restrictions to the ballot box."

== Other All-Star Game events ==
In addition to the All-Star Game, several events are held in the same host city and also televised nationally.

The Home Run Derby, a contest among home run hitters, has been held on the day before the All-Star Game since 1985. The most recent Home Run Derby Champion is Jordan Walker of the St. Louis Cardinals, after defeating Kyle Schwarber of the Philadelphia Phillies at the 2026 Home Run Derby at Citizens Bank Park.

Since 1999, the All-Star Futures Game has been held during All-Star Week. The two teams, one consisting of young players from the United States and the other consisting of young players from all other nations, are usually chosen based on prospect status in the minor leagues.

From 2001 to 2025, the All-Star Legends and Celebrity Softball Game pitted teams with a mixture of former stars from the host team's past, besides celebrities from music, film, and television. This game was held during the day prior to the Home Run Derby. However, it was tape-delayed and broadcast after the Derby. It was replaced by 2026 with a 3×3 co-ed game.

Since 2021, the Major League Baseball draft has been held during the All-Star Break and in the host city of the All-Star Game.

The HBCU Swingman Classic, open to players from 17 historically black colleges and universities in the United States, was introduced in 2023 as part of an MLB-MLBPA Youth Development Foundation initiative.

From 1982 through 1990, the Cracker Jack Old Timers Baseball Classic (which lost the Cracker Jack sponsorship after 1987) was held during the All-Star Break, although it was never officially associated with MLB for publicity reasons. Former Atlanta Braves Vice President Dick Cecil had the initial idea, presented a successful 15-minute pitch to Cracker Jack CEO Frank Forrestal of how this would be their chance to re-associate the brand with baseball, and enlisted the Association of Professional Ball Players of America (APBPA) to help bring in retired players to participate. APBPA leader and former MLB player Chuck Stevens was instrumental in the latter part. The game was played at RFK Stadium in Washington, D.C., from 1982 through 1987 and at the brand new Pilot Field in Buffalo, New York, from 1988 through 1990. It garnered national coverage from the first year thanks to both then-three-year-old network ESPN airing it and the iconic home run that then-75-year-old Luke Appling hit off of Warren Spahn in the first inning – the latter being particularly notable because Appling only had 45 total home runs in his 20-year MLB career. The only player to appear in all nine of the games was Joe DiMaggio.

== All-Star firsts and records ==
All-Star firsts

- First All-Star inducted into the Baseball Hall of Fame - Babe Ruth, 1936
- First rookie All-Star - Joe DiMaggio, 1936
- First All-Star of African descent - Roy Campanella, Larry Doby, Don Newcombe, and Jackie Robinson: 1949
- First All-Star Game MVP - Maury Wills, 1962

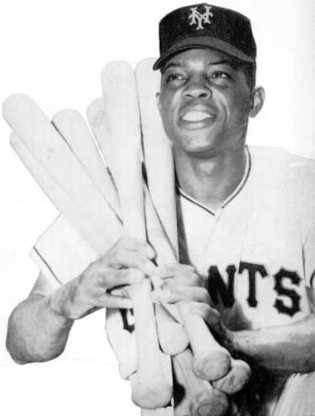
Willie Mays in 1954; 20-time All-Star, 24 All-Star Games

All-Star Game records

(1959-1962 seasons had two All-Star Games and 1945 and 2020 seasons no All-Star Game)

- Most All-Star Game appearance seasons - Hank Aaron, 21
- Most All-Star Games - Hank Aaron, 25
- Most All-Star Game MVP Awards - Willie Mays, Steve Garvey, Gary Carter, Cal Ripken Jr., and Mike Trout: 2
- Most All-Star Game hits - Willie Mays, 23
- Most All-Star Game runs batted in - Ted Williams, 12
- Most All-Star Game home runs - Stan Musial, 6
- Most All-Star Game grand slams - Fred Lynn, 1
- Most All-Star Game stolen bases - Willie Mays, 6
- Most All-Star Game wins - Lefty Gomez, 3
- Most All-Star Game strikeouts - Don Drysdale, 19

== See also ==
- List of Major League Baseball All-Star Games
- List of Major League Baseball All-Star Game broadcasters
- List of Major League Baseball All-Star Game starting pitchers
- Major League Baseball All-Star Game records
- Negro league East–West All-Star Game
- Triple-A All-Star Game

=== Similar events ===
- MLS All-Star Game
- NBA All-Star Game
- NHL All-Star Game
