= First-pitch strike =

Baseball strategy

In baseball, a first-pitch strike is when the pitcher throws a strike to the batter during the first pitch of the at bat. Statistics indicate that throwing a strike on the first pitch allows the pitcher to gain an advantage in the at bat, limiting the hitter's chance of getting on base.

== Importance ==
With the continued interest and development of statistics in the game of baseball, first-pitch strikes have been under the microscope of many fans and sabermetricians (those who study the game based on evidence, mainly stats that measure game activity). Many studies have proven that the first pitch in the at bat is the most important one. And according to Craig Burley's 2004 study in The Hardball Times, throwing a strike on a 0-0 count could potentially save over 12,000 runs scored in a single Major League Baseball season.

In Burley's study, he used stats from the 2003 MLB season. He found that when a pitcher throws a strike on the first pitch of the at bat, hitters collected a .261 batting average. But if the first pitch was a ball, their batting average jumped to .280, a substantial difference.

From Burley, "Let's imagine that we have two pitchers, both of whom are otherwise perfectly average but one of whom always throws a strike on the first pitch, while the other always throws a ball. The first pitcher, the "strike one" pitcher, has an expected ERA (earned run average) of about 3.60. The second one, the otherwise perfectly average one who always throws a ball on pitch one, has an expected ERA of about 5.50. He'll also pitch about 12% fewer innings (without taking into account the higher pitch counts that would result from starting 1-0)."

While there are some players in the game who are notorious for swinging at the first pitch, Burley's study proved that there is little risk in jumping ahead early in the count. Less than 8 percent of first-pitch strikes turn into base hits.

After that it becomes even more difficult for the hitter. Once a pitcher gets to a 0-1 count, hitters hit just .239 against him from there on out.

== Minnesota Twins ==
The Minnesota Twins franchise focuses on command and first-pitch strikes. Considered a small-market team, the Twins needed to find any advantage they could to keep pace with the larger franchises.

Twins pitchers are taught from the very beginning to get ahead in the count, throwing first-pitch strikes as often as possible. In training camp, pitchers who collect the most first-pitch strikes are given free dinner or other rewards.

The scouts and coaches throughout the organization are trained to look for pitchers with consistent arm slots and deliveries, allowing them to spot young players who harness the command that the franchise looks for.

As a team, the Twins haven’t ranked outside the top five in fewest walks allowed since 1996, and they’ve been first or second in that category in nine of the past 13 seasons.

Former Minnesota pitcher Brad Radke became the poster boy for first-pitch strikes, and his rate of 1.63 walks per nine innings ranks 32nd in baseball history.

Minnesota is one of the most successful small-market teams in MLB history, which some have attributed to their focus on simple fundamentals like the first-pitch strike.

"It stems from a manifesto we put together way back in the day: As a small-market club, how are you going to get an edge? We believe that command and control and makeup are true separators in the pitching category."—Twins scouting director Mike Radcliff told ESPN's Jerry Crasnick in May, 2010.

== 2010 ==
According to FanGraphs.com, as of Aug. 11, 2010, the three starting pitchers with the highest first-pitch strike percentages were Cliff Lee (70.8 percent), Carl Pavano (68 percent), and Roy Halladay (67.6 percent). Pavano (3.28) had the highest ERA of the three, with Halladay and Lee both carrying ERAs below 2.50.

Starting pitchers throughout the league have acknowledged that throwing first-pitch strikes gives them a better chance for success.

Daniel Hudson, a 23-year-old starting pitcher for the Arizona Diamondbacks told FoxSports.com on Aug. 6, 2010 that throwing first-pitch strikes has aided in his increased performance.

After a winning start in which he threw first-pitch strikes to 20 of the 29 hitters he faced, he told FoxSports.com, "When you get that first-pitch strike, it automatically puts [the hitters] in a hole and gives me an advantage. It's very important to get that first pitch over in every at-bat."

Seattle Mariners’ pitcher Jason Vargas was enjoying the best season of his career through Aug. 11, 2010, with an ERA close to 3.00. Following a 2009 season in which he won just three games in 14 starts and had an ERA of 4.91, Vargas took a new approach. After throwing just 51 percent strikes on the first pitch in 2009, that number jumped to 63 percent in 2010, above the MLB average. From SeattlePI.com, "It puts him in the drivers' seat to execute pitch sequences to hitters on his own accord, rather than having to give in and offer hitters fastballs in fastball-counts."

Phil Hughes of the New York Yankees has excelled in his first full season as a starting pitcher and was named to the American League All-Star team. Hughes has developed a knack for getting one over on the first pitch, increasing his first-pitch strike percentage in each of his four seasons in the majors. His percentage of 64.3 through Aug. 11, 2010 is the highest of his career, and the eighth best in the American League.

On June 19, 2010, Hughes told NJ.com, "There's a lot of good strike-throwers out there, but that's been my main goal, just get strike one and take it one pitch at a time. Get ahead, and go from there … When you’re falling behind 1-0 as opposed to 0-1, it's a huge difference … That's all I try to do is just throw strikes and be aggressive. And know that if I put myself in those good situations, good counts, more or less good things are going to happen."

Hughes backed up his comments with statistics. Through Aug. 11, 2010, Hughes allowed just a .221 batting average against after throwing a first-pitch strike, as opposed to a .273 batting average against after throwing a ball on the first pitch. His win total on the season is the highest of his career.
