= List of Major League Baseball All-Star Game records =

== All-Star Game appearance record ==
Most games on the roster originally or as a replacement. Two All-Star Games were held each season from 1959 through 1962.

- Hank Aaron 25
- Willie Mays 24
- Stan Musial 24

== All-Star Game MVP Award record ==
- Willie Mays, Steve Garvey, Gary Carter, Cal Ripken Jr., and Mike Trout 2

== Single All-Star Game hitting records ==
- Runs batted in: Al Rosen, Ted Williams 5
- Runs: Ted Williams 4
- Hits: Joe Medwick, Ted Williams, Carl Yastrzemski 4
- Home runs: Gary Carter, Willie McCovey, Al Rosen, Arky Vaughan, Ted Williams 2
- Inside-the-park home runs: Ichiro Suzuki 1
- Grand slams: Fred Lynn 1
- Doubles: Ernie Banks, Barry Bonds, Ted Kluszewski, Paul Konerko, Joe Medwick, Damian Miller, Albert Pujols, Al Simmons 2
- Triples: Rod Carew 2
- Walks: Phil Cavarretta, Charlie Gehringer 3
- Total bases: Ted Williams 10

== Single All-Star Game pitching records ==
- Runs allowed: Atlee Hammaker 7
- Earned runs: Atlee Hammaker 7
- Hits allowed: Tom Glavine 9
- Home runs allowed: Jim Palmer 3
- Innings pitched: Lefty Gomez 6
- Strikeouts: Carl Hubbell, Larry Jansen, Ferguson Jenkins, Johnny Vander Meer 6
- Consecutive Strikeouts: Carl Hubbell, Fernando Valenzuela 5

== Career All-Star Game hitting records ==
- At bats: Willie Mays 75
- Batting average: Charlie Gehringer .500
- Runs batted in: Ted Williams 12
- Runs: Willie Mays 20
- Hits: Willie Mays 23
- Extra base hits: Willie Mays, Stan Musial 8
- Home runs: Stan Musial 6
- Inside-the-park home runs: Ichiro Suzuki 1
- Grand slams: Fred Lynn 1
- Doubles: Dave Winfield 7
- Triples: Willie Mays, Brooks Robinson 3
- Walks: Ted Williams 11
- Total bases: Willie Mays, Stan Musial 40
- Pinch hits: Stan Musial 3

== Career All-Star Game pitching records ==
- Wins: Lefty Gomez 3
- Losses: Mort Cooper, Whitey Ford, Dwight Gooden, Catfish Hunter, Claude Passeau, John Smoltz, Luis Tiant, Clayton Kershaw 2
- Earned runs: Whitey Ford 11
- Hits: Whitey Ford 19
- Innings pitched: Don Drysdale 19⅓
- Batters faced: Don Drysdale 69
- Balks: Dwight Gooden 2
- Walks: Jim Palmer 7
- Strikeouts: Don Drysdale 19
- Games pitched: Roger Clemens 9
- Games started: Don Drysdale, Lefty Gomez, Robin Roberts 5
- Games finished: Rich Gossage 6
- Saves: Mariano Rivera 4
