= 2014 Major League Baseball Home Run Derby =

Baseball competition

- Date: July 14, 2014
- Venue: Target Field
- City: Minneapolis, Minnesota
- Winner: Yoenis Céspedes
- Score: 9–1

The 2014 Major League Baseball Home Run Derby (known through sponsorship as the Gillette Home Run Derby) was a home run hitting contest in Major League Baseball (MLB) between five batters each from the American League and National League. The derby was held on July 14, 2014, at the site of the 2014 MLB All-Star Game, Target Field in Minneapolis, Minnesota. Yoenis Céspedes was the winner, repeating his winning performance in 2013 to join Ken Griffey Jr. and Pete Alonso as the only players to win consecutive Home Run Derbies.

In June, MLB named José Bautista of the Toronto Blue Jays and Troy Tulowitzki of the Colorado Rockies the Home Run Derby captains. On July 8, 2014, the captains each made their first three picks, while saving their final pick for July 10. Tulowitzki selected Todd Frazier of the Cincinnati Reds, Yasiel Puig of the Los Angeles Dodgers, and Giancarlo Stanton of the Miami Marlins, and would later select his teammate Justin Morneau who played in Minnesota for ten seasons. Bautista selected defending home run derby champion Céspedes of the Oakland Athletics, Brian Dozier of the Minnesota Twins, and Adam Jones of the Baltimore Orioles, and added Oakland's Josh Donaldson as his fifth AL selection.

== Rule changes ==
As announced by Major League Baseball, there were changes to the format of the Home Run Derby in 2014. Five players participated from each league, making ten total participants rather than eight in the past. The batting order for the first round was determined prior to the event, with hitter #1 for the National League hitting first, followed by hitter #1 for the American League, and so on until each participant has batted. Each participant received seven outs, rather than 10 in previous years. The player who hit the most home runs from each league in the first round received a bye to the semifinals. The participants with the second and third most home runs from each league will face each other to determine the second semifinalist. The NL semifinal occurred first followed by the AL semifinal. The semifinal winners from each league competed in the finals to determine the Home Run Derby champion. The batting order for the finals was determined by a coin flip. The flex ball, replacing the golden ball from past years, came into play after 6 outs. A home run hit off of a flex ball resulted in a $10,000 donation to charity by Gillette and MLB. Ties in any round were broken by a 3-swing swing-off, and if still needed, sudden-death swings until one player homers and the other does not.

== Results ==
Target Field, Minneapolis — A.L. 54, N.L. 24
Player	Team	League	Round 1	Round 2	Round 3	Finals	Total
Yoenis Céspedes	Athletics	American	3 (2)	**9**	**7**	**9**	28
Todd Frazier	Reds	National	2 (1)	6	1	1	10
José Bautista	Blue Jays	American	**10**	Bye	4	—	14
Giancarlo Stanton	Marlins	National	6	Bye	0	—	6
Adam Jones	Orioles	American	4	3	—	—	7
Troy Tulowitzki	Rockies	National	4	2	—	—	6
Josh Donaldson	Athletics	American	3 (1)	—	—	—	3
Justin Morneau	Rockies	National	2 (0)	—	—	—	2
Brian Dozier	Twins	American	2	—	—	—	2
Yasiel Puig	Dodgers	National	0	—	—	—	0

Notes:

- Numbers in parentheses denote tiebreaker swingoff
- Numbers in bold denote round leader
- The captains of the AL and NL teams appear in italics

Round 2
American League
2	Adam Jones	3
3	Yoenis Céspedes	9
National League
2	Troy Tulowitzki	2
3	Todd Frazier	6

Round 3 (Semifinals)
1	José Bautista	4
3	Yoenis Céspedes	7
1	Giancarlo Stanton	0
3	Todd Frazier	1

Finals
3	Yoenis Céspedes	9
3	Todd Frazier	1
