= Yoenis Céspedes =

Cuban-born baseball player (born 1985)

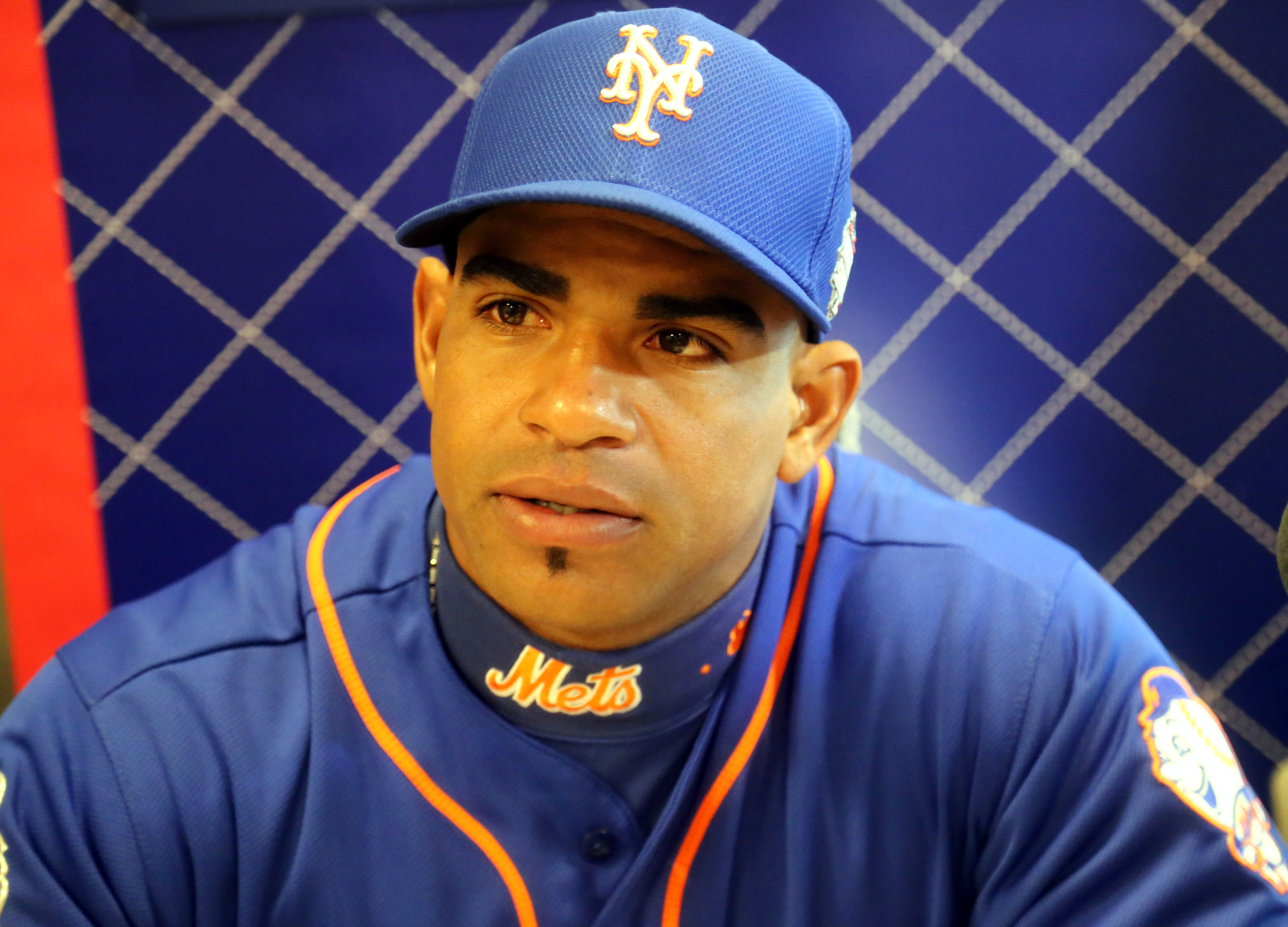
- Céspedes with the New York Mets in 2015
- Outfielder
- Born: October 18, 1985 (age 41); Campechuela, Granma Province, Cuba
- Batted: Right Threw: Right

MLB debut
- March 28, 2012, for the Oakland Athletics

Last MLB appearance
- August 1, 2020, for the New York Mets

MLB statistics
- Batting average: .273
- Home runs: 165
- Runs batted in: 528
- Stats at Baseball Reference

Teams
- Oakland Athletics (2012–2014); Boston Red Sox (2014); Detroit Tigers (2015); New York Mets (2015–2018, 2020)

Career highlights and awards
- 2× All-Star (2014, 2016); Gold Glove Award (2015); Silver Slugger Award (2016)
Medals
Men's baseball
Representing Cuba
Baseball World Cup
Silver medal – second place	2009 Nettuno	Team
Intercontinental Cup
Gold medal – first place	2010 Taichung	Team
Pan American Games
Gold medal – first place	2007 Rio de Janeiro	Team
World University Baseball Championship
Gold medal – first place	2010 Tokyo	Team

Yoenis Céspedes Milanés (born October 18, 1985), nicknamed "La Potencia" (The Power), is a Cuban-born former professional baseball outfielder. He made his Major League Baseball (MLB) debut on March 28, 2012, for the Oakland Athletics, and has also played in MLB for the Boston Red Sox, Detroit Tigers, and New York Mets. Primarily a left fielder in his early career, he split between left and center field on the Mets. A right-hand batter and fielder, he stands 5 feet 10 inches (1.78 m) tall and weighs 220 pounds (100 kg).

From Campechuela, Cuba, Céspedes played eight seasons until 2010 for the Alazanes de Granma in the Cuban National Series. In that time, he batted .319, .404 on-base percentage (OBP), .565 slugging percentage (SLG), 169 home runs and 557 runs batted in (RBI) over 528 games. He was also a member of the Cuba national team, winning gold medals in three tournaments. In MLB, he won the Home Run Derby in both 2013 and 2014. He is a two-time All-Star, and played in the 2015 World Series as member of the National League champion Mets.

== Early life ==
Céspedes was born in the small town of Campechuela, in Granma Province, Cuba. Céspedes is the son of Estela Milanés, a softball pitcher who appeared in the 2000 Summer Olympics for Cuba, and Cresencio Céspedes, a former Cuban League catcher who separated from Milanés when Yoenis was one year old. At age 10, he was sent by his mother to a state-run school where he could focus on baseball.

== Cuban career ==
Before defecting, Céspedes' first name was generally spelled Yoennis. Céspedes debuted in the Cuban National Series with the Alazanes de Granma during the 2003–04 Cuban National Series, hitting .302/.382/.503 (batting average, on-base percentage and slugging percentage). He was considered for the Cuban National Series Rookie of the Year Award, but lost out to Frank Montieth.

He batted .313/.403/.540 in the 2004–05 season.

In the 2005–06 season, he hit .351/.444/.649 with 23 home runs, 89 runs and 78 runs batted in (RBI) in 88 games played. He tied Yuli Gurriel for the National Series lead in runs and was four home runs behind Gurriel for the lead, placing second. He tied for seventh in doubles (24), was second in total bases (220, 6 behind Gurriel) and was 4th in slugging. He hit .481/.481/.741 for Cuba in the 2006 Haarlem Baseball Week. Despite his strong performance, Céspedes was left off Cuba's roster for the inaugural World Baseball Classic in 2006. Joe Kehoskie, at the time an agent who followed Cuban baseball closely, told Toronto's The Globe and Mail that Céspedes was the best player left at home by Cuba.

He produced at a .303/.402/.541 rate in the 2006–07 season with 17 home runs and 79 runs in 89 games. He again led in runs. He was also fifth in doubles (24), tied Yosvani Peraza for third in home runs, was fourth in total bases (184), tied Alfredo Despaigne for fourth in RBI, tied for fourth in steals (15) and was sixth in slugging. He was 1-for-7 with a steal and a run in the 2007 Pan-American Games in his debut for the Cuban national team.

He hit .284/.342/.552 in the 2007–08 season. He was among the league leaders in RBI (tying teammate Despaigne for third with 78), tied Yoandry Urgellés for fourth in runs (82), was second in home runs (26, trailing only Alexeis Bell) and fourth in 202 total bases.

Céspedes batted .323/.411/.601 in the 2008–09 season with 24 homers and 83 runs in 87 games. He tied Leonys Martín for fourth in the league in runs and tied Rolando Meriño for third in home runs (trailing Alfredo Despaigne and Joan Carlos Pedroso). He was seventh in total bases (197), ninth in RBI (76) and 10th in slugging. He made the All-Star outfield alongside Giorvis Duvergel and Despaigne.

Céspedes was the starting center fielder for Cuba in the 2009 World Baseball Classic. He hit .458/.480/1.000 with a double, three triples, two home runs, five runs and five RBI in six games. He led Cuba in slugging and was second to Frederich Cepeda in average, OBP and OPS. He tied Cepeda and Gurriel for the team lead in runs and tied Gourriel for second in homers, behind Cepeda. He broke a 1–1 tie against Australia with a 6th-inning solo homer off Damian Moss and started a 16–4 romp over Mexico with a leadoff triple against Pablo Ortega. Céspedes tripled off Hisashi Iwakuma in Cuba's last game of the tournament, a 5–0 loss to Japan, but did not score. Earlier in that game, he dropped a fly from Michihiro Ogasawara to let the first two Japanese runs score. Cuba thus missed the final four of an event for the first time ever; the Cuban team had also made the finals of every global baseball competition since 1959. Céspedes was named a member of the 2009 All-WBC team following the tournament.

Céspedes started the 2009 Baseball World Cup as Cuba's starting center fielder, but struggled and only hit .194/.275/.333 while being caught in his only steal attempt; Martín replaced him as the event went along. In the gold medal game, Céspedes pinch-hit for Yorbis Borroto successfully with a ninth-inning single off Brad Lincoln in Cuba's 10–5 loss to Team USA, settling for a silver medal.

He hit .345/.426/.617 in the 2009–2010 season with 87 runs and 22 homers in 87 contests. He was third in the league in runs (three behind Gurriel), 10th in hits (118), 8th in home runs, 4th in total bases (211, behind Alfredo Despaigne, Gourriel and José Abreu) and was ninth in slugging. He was not picked as an All-Star outfielder as Despaigne, Cepeda and Bell took the three slots.

Céspedes went 11 for 22 with 12 runs, 14 RBI, two doubles and four homers in six games at the 2010 World University Baseball Championship. He drove in six against South Korea and five against China. In the gold medal game, he was 0-for-4 with a strikeout as Cuba's fifth batter in a 4–3 win over Team USA. He made the tournament All-Star outfield alongside Mikie Mahtook and Shota Ishimine. He played for Cuba when it finished second in the 2011 Pan American Games Qualifying Tournament. In the 2010 Intercontinental Cup, he was 3-for-10 with a double, three runs, four RBI and a walk as a backup. In the 4–1 win over the Dutch national team in the gold medal game, he was the second of three left fielders Cuba used. He replaced Yoandry Urgellés, was retired by Berry van Driel and then replaced by Despaigne.

He put up a .333/.424/.667 batting line with 89 runs, 33 home runs and 99 RBI in 90 games in the 2010–2011 season. He led the league in runs (five ahead of Cepeda), tied Abreu for the home run lead (breaking Despaigne's league record by one), tied Cepeda for the most total bases (236), tied Ramón Tamayo for seventh in steals (11 in 14 tries), led in RBI (six ahead of Abreu) and finished fifth in slugging. He was named the All-Star center fielder, joining Despaigne and Cepeda in the outfield.

=== 2023 World Baseball Classic ===
Céspedes once again represented Cuba at the 2023 World Baseball Classic, the first such competition in which event organizers allowed the Cuban team to roster players who had previously defected from Cuba. He played in two of the team's four Pool A games in Taichung, going hitless with two walks in eight plate appearances. Following the pool stage, Céspedes returned to the United States rather than traveling to the quarterfinals in Tokyo with the team, stepping away from the team for personal reasons.

== Major League Baseball career ==
In the summer of 2011, Céspedes and six others took a 23-hour speedboat ride departing Cuba and heading for the Dominican Republic. After arriving in the Dominican, he met Dominican agent Edgar Mercedes, who established residency for him in Santiago, which allowed him to bypass the MLB draft and become a free agent.

Céspedes was considered a five-tool outfielder going into free agency. Kevin Goldstein of Baseball Prospectus declared Céspedes "arguably the best all-around player to come out of Cuba in a generation".

=== Oakland Athletics ===
==== 2012 ====
After interest from numerous Major League teams, Céspedes agreed to a four-year, $36 million contract with the Oakland Athletics on February 13, 2012, with the deal becoming official the following month. Céspedes began the 2012 season for the Athletics at his usual position of center field, but was later moved to left field upon the return of veteran center fielder Coco Crisp.

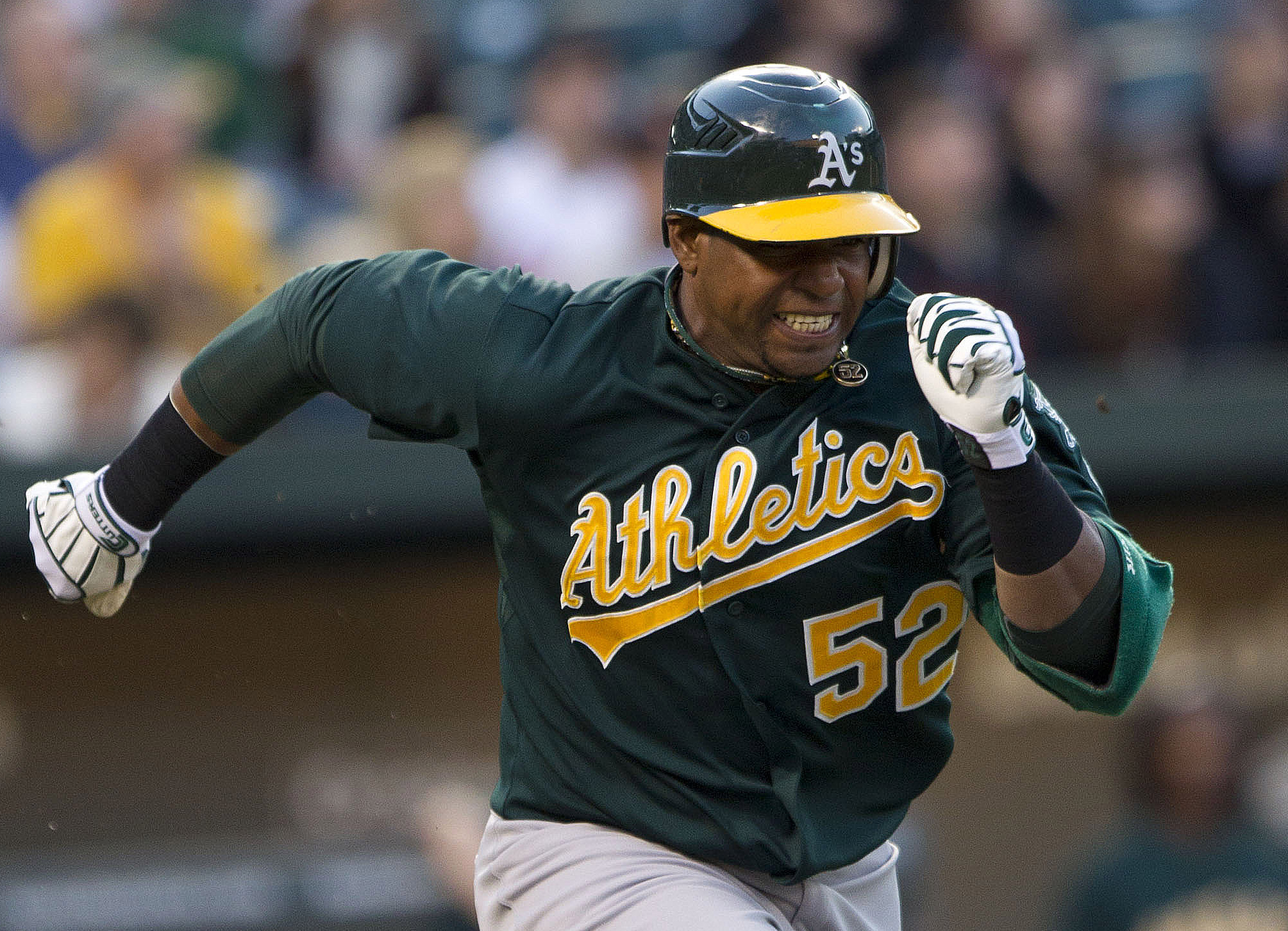
Céspedes with the Oakland Athletics in 2012

On March 28, in his major league debut, he went 1-for-3, and was also hit by a pitch. The following day, he hit his first major league home run, a two-run shot off Seattle Mariners reliever Shawn Kelley. Céspedes hit his first walk-off home run on June 21 against the Los Angeles Dodgers with the final score of 4–1, resulting in a three-game sweep. The Athletics would go on to win the American League West, with Céspedes batting .316, with a .381 OBP in the postseason.

==== 2013 ====
On July 15, 2013, Céspedes won the 2013 Home Run Derby. A last-minute addition by team captain Robinson Canó to represent the American League squad, he hit 32 home runs total in the exhibition, including 17 in the first round. He defeated the National League's Bryce Harper in the final round by hitting 9 home runs, with five swings to spare. He was the first winner of the contest who had not been selected to that year's All-Star Game. Céspedes hit .240 for the year and had 26 home runs along with 80 RBIs. Though Céspedes had a great postseason, the A's were eliminated by the Detroit Tigers. He suffered several injuries throughout the season, including wrist, hamstring, and knee injuries.

==== 2014 ====
Céspedes had a great start to the season, hitting .273 with 14 homers and 55 RBIs through July 1, 2014, and was third in the All-Star voting for the AL behind José Bautista of the Toronto Blue Jays and Mike Trout of the Los Angeles Angels of Anaheim.

Céspedes was known for having a great throwing arm. After getting three assists against the Toronto Blue Jays and Baltimore Orioles, Céspedes gunned down Chris Iannetta and Kole Calhoun at home plate in the same inning in a game against the Angels on May 31. He would have an even more memorable throw, again against the Angels, when he threw out Howie Kendrick at home on June 10. Céspedes bobbled a hit off the bat of Mike Trout, prompting Kendrick to attempt scoring on the play. Céspedes corralled the ball and uncorked a 300-foot rocket to nail Kendrick at the plate. He would once again terrorize Angel baserunners as he threw out Albert Pujols trying to advance to third when the ball got by Céspedes in the next game. This put Céspedes at 11 outfield assists on the season, which led the league.

On July 1, Céspedes suffered a hamstring injury while running against the Tigers on a RBI hit by Brandon Moss. Céspedes along with five other A's players (Josh Donaldson, Derek Norris, Brandon Moss, and pitchers Scott Kazmir and Sean Doolittle) were chosen to play in the 2014 MLB All-Star Game in Target Field. In the final week of fan voting to select starters for the All-Star Game, he was passed by Adam Jones. On July 14, Céspedes won the Home Run Derby for a second time, becoming the first player to win consecutive Derby titles since Ken Griffey Jr. accomplished the feat in 1999. Céspedes played in the 2014 All-Star Game, where he went 0-for-2.

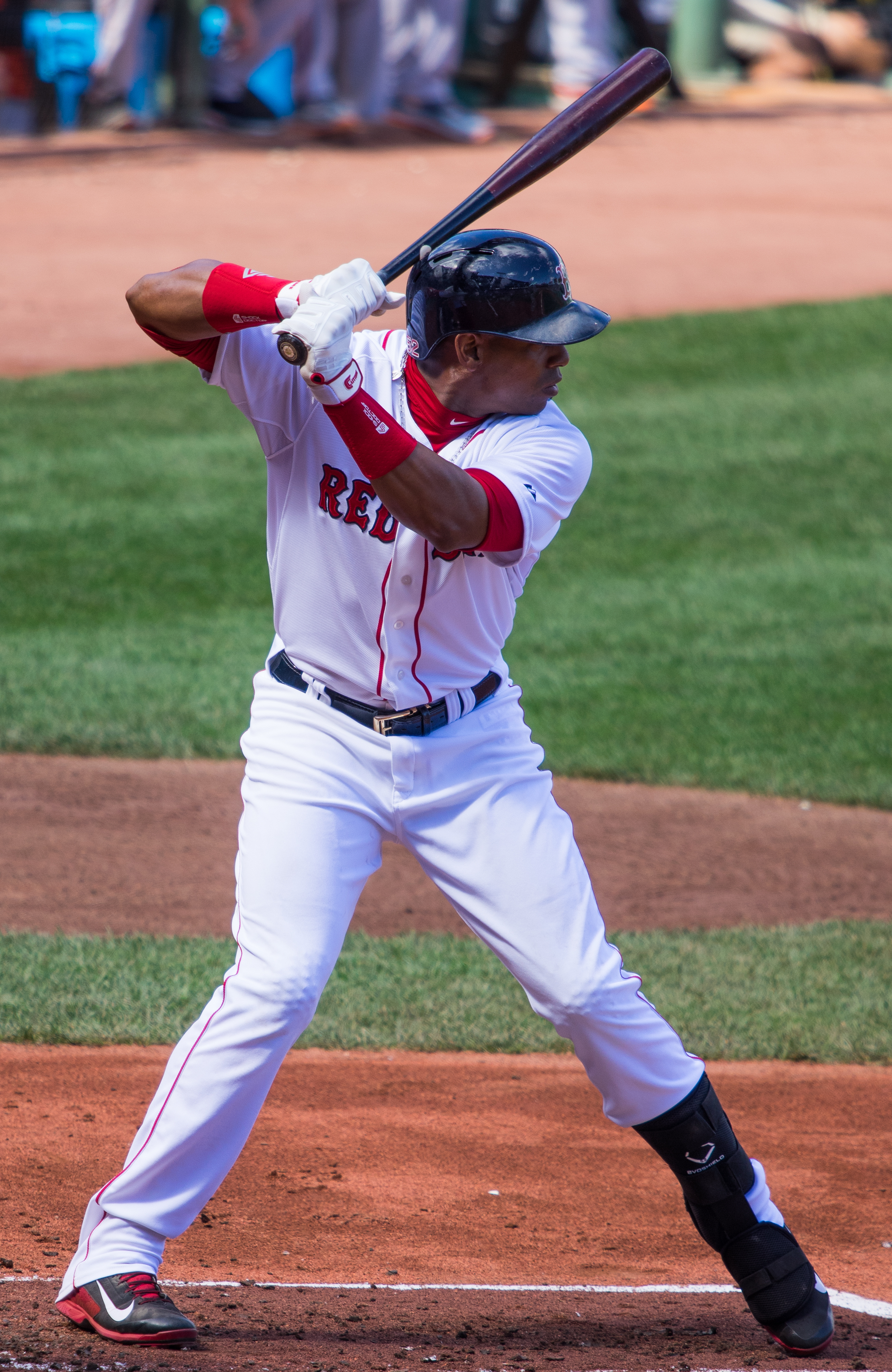
Céspedes with the Boston Red Sox in 2014

=== Boston Red Sox ===
On July 31, 2014, Céspedes was traded to the Boston Red Sox in exchange for pitcher Jon Lester and outfielder Jonny Gomes.

Céspedes hit his first home run as a member of the Red Sox on August 10, 2014, against the Los Angeles Angels of Anaheim, with a three-run home run. In 51 games with Boston, Céspedes batted .269 with five home runs and 33 RBIs. Overall, for the 2014 season, Céspedes had 22 home runs with 100 RBIs, while batting .260.

=== Detroit Tigers ===
On December 11, 2014, the Red Sox traded Céspedes along with Alex Wilson and Gabe Speier to the Detroit Tigers for Rick Porcello. Céspedes played his first game with the Tigers during opening day against the Minnesota Twins on April 6, 2015, where he robbed Kurt Suzuki of a home run, leading to a 4–0 victory for the Tigers. Through June 13, Céspedes was hitting .308 with nine home runs and 33 runs batted in. He was not selected as an All Star but was put in as a player on the All-Star Final Vote. Therefore, he could not compete in the Home Run Derby after winning the two previous years.

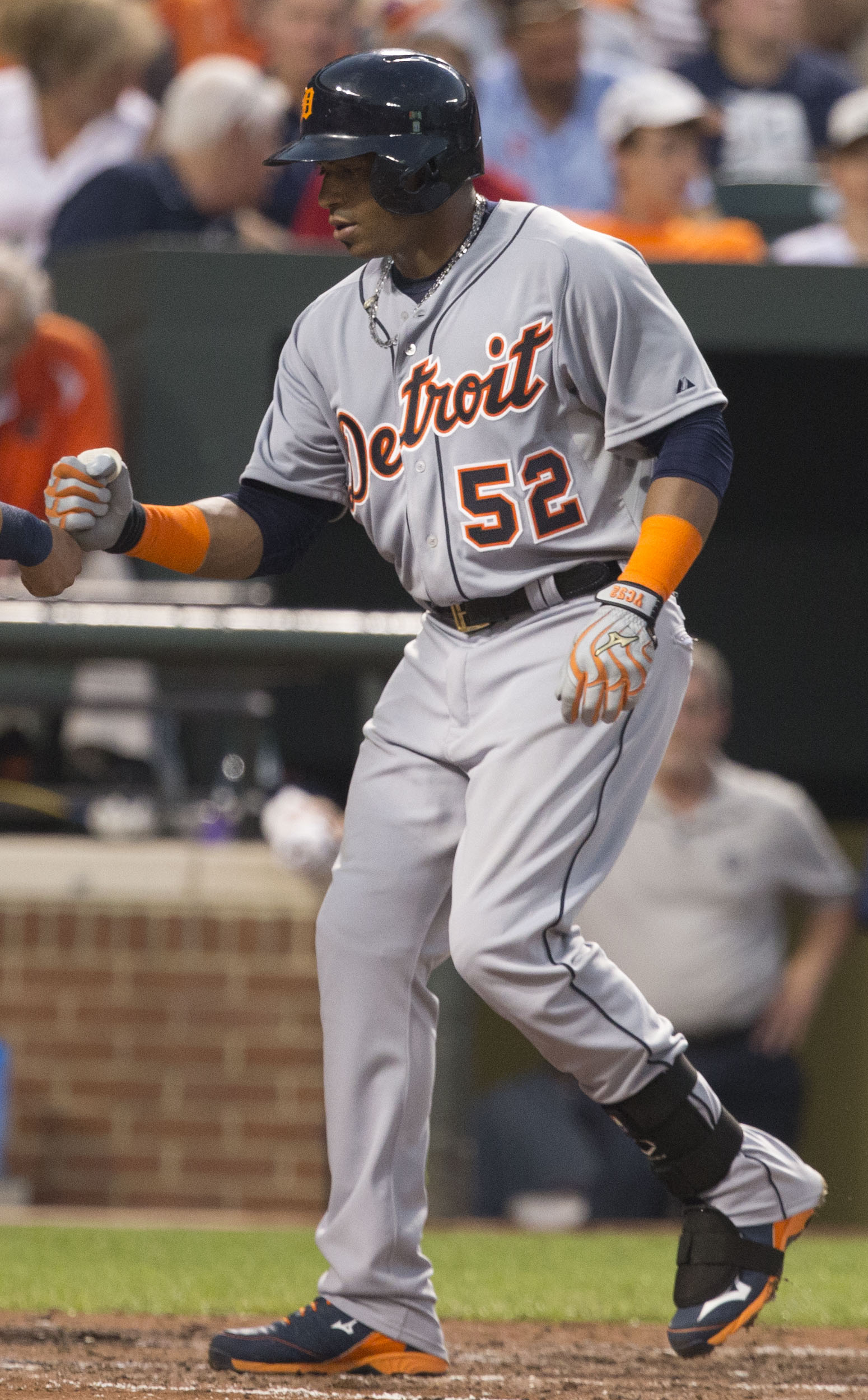
Céspedes with the Detroit Tigers in 2015

Céspedes won the American League Gold Glove Award in left field. In 99 games for the Tigers, Céspedes had nine assists, 11 Defensive Runs Saved and a 15 ultimate zone rating. He became only the second player in MLB history to win a Gold Glove Award after a mid-season trade between leagues, following Vic Power in 1964.

=== New York Mets ===
==== 2015 ====
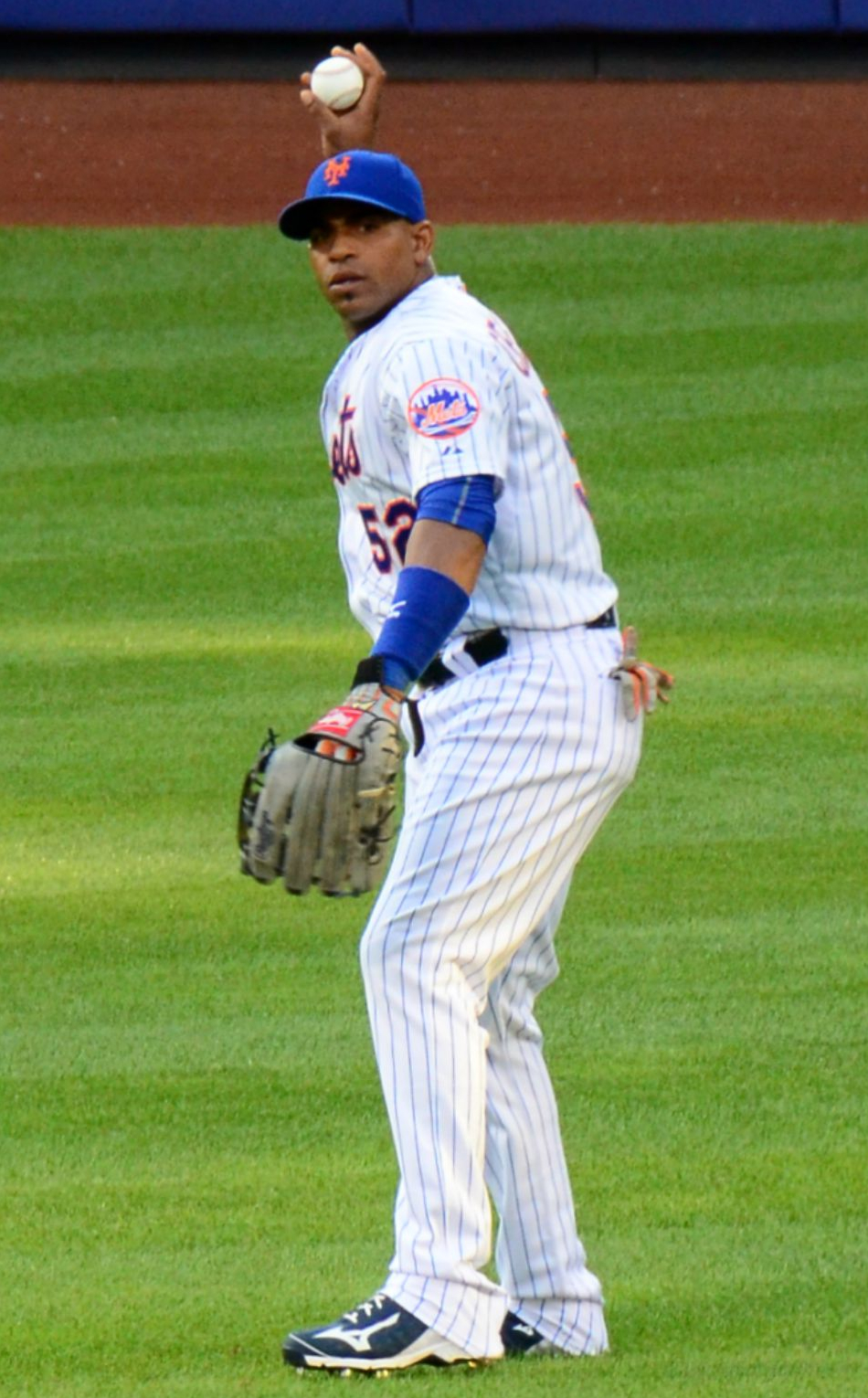
Céspedes with the New York Mets in 2015

On July 31, 2015, Céspedes was traded to the New York Mets for minor league pitchers Michael Fulmer and Luis Cessa. On August 21, Céspedes went 5-for-6 against the Colorado Rockies, hitting three home runs in a game for the first time. Céspedes finished a triple shy of the cycle. It was ranked the best offensive game of the season by ESPN.com. In his first 41 games with the Mets, Céspedes exploded, posting a .309 batting average, 17 home runs, 42 RBIs, and a .691 slugging percentage. His offensive explosion helped the Mets jump up to a 9^{1}/_{2} game lead over the Washington Nationals in the National League East as of September 14. Because of his efforts, Céspedes was awarded the NL Player of the Week Award for September 7–13. He batted .345, hit four home runs, scored six runs, and drove in 12 runs while posting a 1.263 OPS. Across 57 games for the Mets in 2015, Céspedes batted .287/.337/.604 with 17 home runs and 44 RBI.

In Game 3 of the National League Division Series against the Los Angeles Dodgers, his three-hit, three-run, three-RBI performance, including a home run, helped the Mets take a 13–7 win and a 2–1 series lead. In Game 1 of the National League Championship Series against the Chicago Cubs, Céspedes threw Starlin Castro out at the plate, preserving a then 1–1 tie which the Mets won 4–2. In the sixth inning of Game 3, Céspedes caught the Cubs off-guard by stealing third base. He later scored the go-ahead run when Trevor Cahill's uncaught third strike allowed Michael Conforto to reach base safely.

The 2015 World Series started inauspiciously for Céspedes when Kansas City Royals' leadoff hitter Alcides Escobar hit Matt Harvey's first pitch to center field, and Céspedes misplayed the ball, then booted it into left field, resulting in the first World Series inside-the-park home run since 1929. The Royals would eventually take the series 4–1. In the series, Céspedes batted .150 with no extra-base hits. At the end of the season, he became a free agent.

==== 2016 ====
On January 26, 2016, Céspedes re-signed with the Mets on a three-year, $75 million contract, with an opt-out after the first season. On April 26, Céspedes came off the bench against the Cincinnati Reds in the 7th inning and hit a first-pitch pinch-hit three-run homer to tie the game at 3. He had previously sat out the last few games due to a lingering leg injury. The Mets eventually won the game 4–3. On April 29 against the San Francisco Giants, Céspedes hit a grand slam in the 3rd inning, breaking the Mets' record for the most runs scored in an inning with 12. The Mets went on to win the game 13–1. His 466 feet (142 m) home run against the Chicago Cubs on June 30 tied for the longest in Citi Field history.

On July 5, Céspedes was named to the National League roster for the 2016 MLB All-Star Game at Petco Park, joining teammates Noah Syndergaard, Bartolo Colón, Jeurys Familia and Mets manager Terry Collins, but was later taken off the roster along with Syndergaard due to an injury. In August, Céspedes was criticized for golfing while on the disabled list. Across 132 games for the Mets in 2016, he batted .280/.354/.530 with 31 home runs and 86 RBI.

==== 2017 ====
Céspedes opted out of his contract with the Mets on November 3, 2016 and became a free agent. On November 30, the Mets re-signed him to a four-year, $110 million contract with a no-trade clause.

On April 11, 2017, Céspedes hit three home runs in a single game as the Mets won 14–4 over the Philadelphia Phillies. On April 27, Céspedes left the game after pulling his left hamstring, and on the same day, he was placed on the 10-day disabled list. His season ended early on August 25 when he strained his right hamstring against the Washington Nationals. He finished the 2017 season with a .292 batting average and 17 home runs in 81 games played.

==== 2018 ====
After spring training ended, Céspedes spoke confidently about the 2018 Mets, claiming that they were the "best team he had been around". On April 18, 2018 against the Washington Nationals, he capped off a 9-run 8th inning for the Mets with a grand slam. Céspedes batted .262 with 9 home runs and 29 RBIs in 38 games in 2018, as his season ended with him undergoing surgery on both heels which would result in him missing 8–10 months.

==== 2019 ====
On May 20, 2019, it was announced that Céspedes fractured his right ankle on his ranch after trapping a wild boar, effectively ending his hopes of playing in 2019. He missed the entire season.

==== 2020 ====
On July 24, 2020, Céspedes returned to major league action for the Mets' season opener against the Atlanta Braves at Citi Field. He hit a 7th inning home run in a Mets 1–0 victory, becoming the first designated hitter to hit a home run in a National League game. Céspedes, off to a .161 start to the shortened season, did not report to the Mets for their August 2 game; his agent announced during the game that Céspedes had opted out of the 2020 season, citing concerns regarding the COVID-19 pandemic. As a result, he ended his five-year tenure with the Mets and became a free agent at the conclusion of the 2020 season.

On November 21, 2024, Céspedes announced that he was interested in an MLB comeback with the Mets.

== Personal life ==
While playing in the major leagues, Céspedes lived in Manhattan, New York during the season, and on his ranch in Port St. Lucie, Florida, during the offseason. He has a son, Yoenis Jr., whom he has not seen since he left Cuba, and is only able to speak to on the phone. He has tried to get him into the United States. He has a half-brother, Yoelqui, who played in the Chicago White Sox organization.

In 2014, Céspedes signed with Jay-Z's Roc Nation Sports, a sports agency division of Roc Nation. An exotic car enthusiast, Céspedes arrived to 2016 Mets' spring training with a variety of custom sports cars on display. His collection includes a custom 2016 Ford F-250, two custom Polaris Slingshots, a custom Lamborghini Aventador, an Alfa Romeo 8C Competizione, and a custom Jeep Wrangler, all totaling a little under $1 million.

Céspedes bought a 270-pound hog from a local county fair while at 2016 Mets' spring training, reportedly paying $7,000 for it.

Céspedes acquired Chandler Bats in July 2019. The company specializes in professional wood baseball bats primarily made from maple trees. Aaron Judge and Shohei Ohtani use the bats.

== Awards ==
Championships earned or shared

- 3× Cuba national team gold medallist (2007 Pan Am Games, 2010 International Cup, 2010 World University)
- 2× Home Run Derby champion (2013, 2014)
- National League champion (2015)

Awards

- All-World Baseball Classic Team (2009)
- American League Rookie of the Month (September 2012)
- 2× MLB All-Star (2014, 2016)
- 2× MLB Player of the Week (July 15, 2012; September 13, 2015)
- Gold Glove Award at left field (2015)
- Silver Slugger Award at outfield (2016)

Statistical leader

- Assists at outfield leader (2014)
- Total zone runs at left field leader (2015)

== See also ==
- Detroit Tigers award winners and league leaders
- List of baseball players who defected from Cuba
- List of Major League Baseball players from Cuba
- New York Mets award winners and league leaders
- Chandler Bats - Céspedes owns the company since 2019.
