= 2015 Major League Baseball Home Run Derby =

Baseball competition

- Date: July 13, 2015
- Venue: Great American Ball Park
- City: Cincinnati, Ohio
- Winner: Todd Frazier
- Score: 15–14

The 2015 Major League Baseball Home Run Derby (known through sponsorship as the Gillette Home Run Derby presented by Head & Shoulders) was a home run hitting contest between eight batters from Major League Baseball (MLB). The derby was held on July 13, 2015, at Great American Ball Park in Cincinnati, Ohio, the site of the 2015 MLB All-Star Game.

The contest saw several rule changes from MLB in an attempt to enliven the event and draw more interest to it. Batters faced off in a single-elimination, bracket-style competition, and each round was timed, rather than limited by number of outs. Todd Frazier was the winner, defeating Joc Pederson in the final round, 15–14, winning the derby in front of his hometown crowd.

== Rule changes ==
As announced by Major League Baseball, there were changes to the format of the Home Run Derby in 2015. Eight players participated in the derby in a bracket-style, single-elimination timed event. Each player had five minutes to hit as many home runs as possible. Hitters were also awarded bonus time for hitting long home runs. Hitters were awarded an additional minute if they hit two home runs over 420 feet and an additional 30 seconds if they hit a home run over 475 feet. Hitters were also allowed one 45 second "timeout" to stop the clock. Flex balls came into play during the final minute (bonus time included); any homer meant a $10,000 donation by Gillette & MLB.

The eight competing players were seeded 1-8 based on their home run totals as of July 7. The higher seed hit second in any round, and the round ended if the higher seed surpassed the total of the first hitter. In the event of a tie, the two hitters competed in a 90-second swing-off (with no timeouts nor bonus time awarded). If there remained a tie, the hitters engaged in three swing-off rounds; thereafter, sudden-death swing-off rounds until a winner was determined.

=== Further rule changes ===
Due to the threat of rain, changes were announced to the Home Run Derby rules.

- The five-minute time limit was shortened to four minutes.
- The 1-minute bonus time was changed, with players receiving a 30-second bonus if they hit two home runs over 425 feet.

== Results ==
Quarterfinals
1 | Albert Pujols (LAA) | 10
8 | Kris Bryant (CHC) | 9
4 | Joc Pederson (LAD) | 13
5 | Manny Machado (BAL) | 12
3 | Josh Donaldson (TOR) | 9
6 | Anthony Rizzo (CHC) | 8
2 | Todd Frazier (CIN) | 14
7 | Prince Fielder (TEX) | 13

Semifinals
1 | Albert Pujols | 11
4 | Joc Pederson | 12
3 | Josh Donaldson | 9
2 | Todd Frazier | 10

Finals
4 | Joc Pederson | 14
2 | Todd Frazier | 15
