= Brian Dozier =

American baseball player (born 1987)

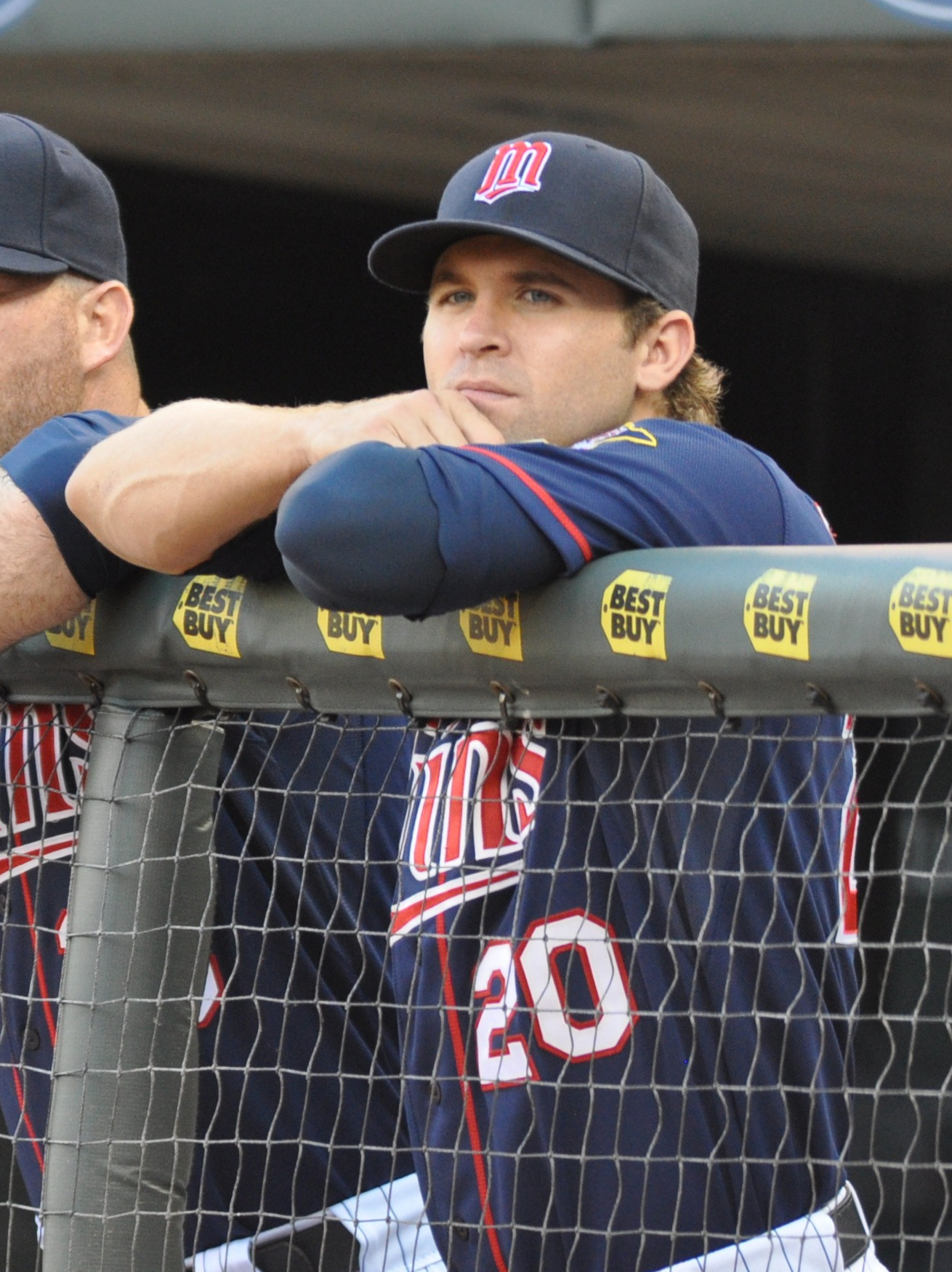
- Dozier with the Minnesota Twins in 2012
- Second baseman
- Born: May 15, 1987 (age 39); Tupelo, Mississippi, U.S.
- Batted: Right Threw: Right

MLB debut
- May 7, 2012, for the Minnesota Twins

Last MLB appearance
- August 14, 2020, for the New York Mets

MLB statistics
- Batting average: .244
- Home runs: 192
- Runs batted in: 561
- Stats at Baseball Reference

Teams
- Minnesota Twins (2012–2018); Los Angeles Dodgers (2018); Washington Nationals (2019); New York Mets (2020)

Career highlights and awards
- All-Star (2015); World Series champion (2019); Gold Glove Award (2017)

James Brian Dozier (/ˈdoʊʒər/;born May 15, 1987) is an American former professional baseball second baseman. The Minnesota Twins selected Dozier in the eighth round of the 2009 Major League Baseball draft. He made his MLB debut in 2012 and he played in MLB for the Twins, Los Angeles Dodgers, Washington Nationals and New York Mets. Dozier was an All-Star in 2015, and won a Gold Glove Award in 2017.

== Amateur career ==
Dozier played baseball for Itawamba Agricultural High School located in Fulton, Mississippi, becoming a local star in the town of 4,000. In baseball, he was selected All-State for two years and named "Player of the Year" in north Mississippi. He also received varsity letters in football, golf, and basketball. While playing in high school, he also played for American Legion Baseball's Post 49's Tupelo 49ers from 2002–2005.

== College career ==
Dozier attended the University of Southern Mississippi and played college baseball for the Southern Mississippi Golden Eagles from 2006 through 2009. He was named a Freshman All-American and selected to the Conference USA All-Freshman Team. In 224 career games at Southern Miss, Dozier hit .355 with 55 doubles, seven triples, 16 home runs, and 152 runs batted in. He was a member of the Southern Miss team that went to the College World Series in 2009. Dozier played for the Bethesda Big Train of the Cal Ripken Collegiate Baseball League in 2006.

== Professional career ==
=== Minnesota Twins ===
The Minnesota Twins selected Dozier in the eighth round of the 2009 Major League Baseball draft. He was chosen as the Twins' Minor League Player of the Year in 2011. The Twins invited Dozier to spring training in 2012.

Dozier was called up in May 2012 to replace Justin Morneau. On May 13, Dozier hit his first career Major League home run, off Ricky Romero of the Toronto Blue Jays. In 2012, he batted .234/.271/.332 with six home runs in 316 at bats. In 2013, Dozier batted .244/.312/.414.

In 2014, Dozier surpassed Hall of Famer Paul Molitor's Twins franchise record of 25 runs scored in the month of April, a record that had stood for 18 years. Dozier was not selected to the 2014 All-Star Game; however, he was selected by American League captain José Bautista to participate in the 2014 Home Run Derby. On August 20, Dozier became the first second baseman in Twins history and 13th in MLB history to hit 20 home runs and steal 20 bases in one season. Additionally, Dozier was the first Twins player since Torii Hunter did so in 2004. At season's end, Dozier scored the second most runs in a season (112) in Minnesota's history since Chuck Knoblauch tallied 117 runs in 1997. On defense, he led American League second basemen in errors (15) and assists (475).

Dozier was selected as a roster replacement for José Bautista in the 2015 Major League Baseball All-Star Game after coming in second to Mike Moustakas in the All-Star Final Vote. Entering the game in the eighth inning as a pinch hitter, Dozier cracked a solo home run off the Pittsburgh Pirates' Mark Melancon to become the 16th player to homer in his first All-Star Game at-bat. He finished the season batting .236/.307/.444 with 28 home runs and a career-high 148 strikeouts (ninth in the American League), and leading the majors in pull percentage (60.2%). Dozier was named a finalist for the 2015 American League Second Baseman (2B) Rawlings Gold Glove Award, alongside fellow second basemen Astros Jose Altuve and Tigers Ian Kinsler.

On September 12, 2016, Dozier became the first American League second baseman to hit 40 home runs in a season, with a third inning shot against Daniel Norris of the Detroit Tigers. He finished the season with 42 home runs, and again leading the majors in pull percentage (56.4%).

Dozier set a new Twins record with a 16-game hitting streak to start off the 2018 season. In the 10th inning of the July 15 game against the Tampa Bay Rays, Dozier hit the first walk-off grand slam in the history of Target Field. It was the first time in Major League Baseball history that extra inning, walk-off grand slams had been hit on consecutive days, following Xander Bogaerts' 10th inning slam for the Boston Red Sox the day before. It was Dozier's fourth walk-off home run and sixth walk-off hit at Target Field, both records for the ballpark. He also became only the second player (after Eddie Rosario) to have hit multiple grand slams at Target Field. Dozier batted .227/.307/.405 with 16 home runs in 410 at bats in 2018 for the Twins.

=== Los Angeles Dodgers ===
On July 31, 2018, Dozier was traded to the Los Angeles Dodgers in exchange for Logan Forsythe and minor leaguers Devin Smeltzer and Luke Raley. In 47 games with the Dodgers he hit only .182/.300/.350 with 5 homers and 20 RBIs in 143 at bats, and was relegated to pinch-hitting duties in the playoffs.

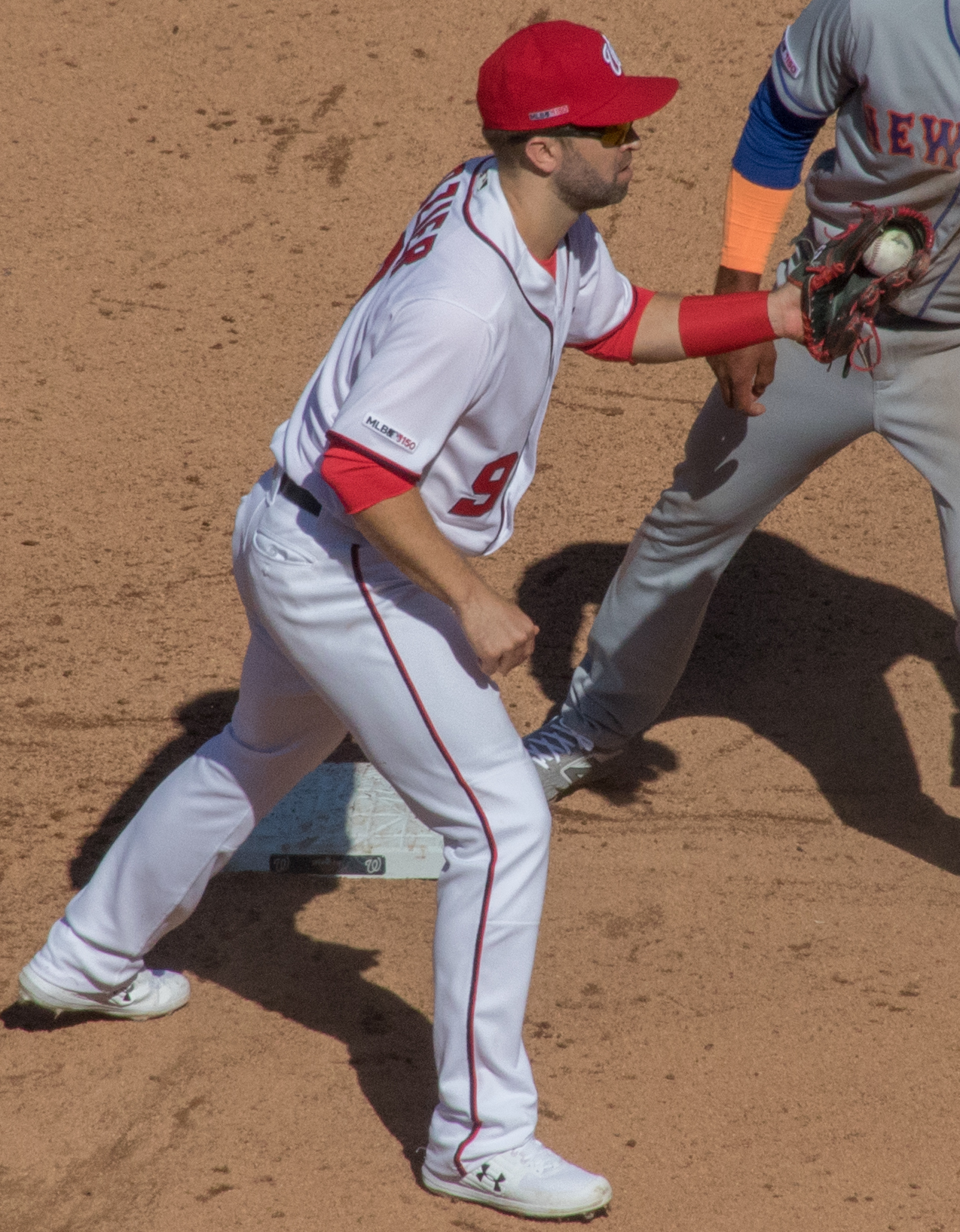
Dozier with the Nationals at Nationals Park in 2019

=== Washington Nationals ===
On January 13, 2019, Dozier signed a one-year, $9 million contract with the Washington Nationals.

In 2019, he batted .238/.340/.430 with 20 home runs and 50 RBIs. Defensively, he had a -5 Defensive Runs Saved (DRS) rating, the lowest in the National League among second basemen. The Nationals finished the season with a 93–69 record, clinching a wild card spot. They went on to win the World Series over the Astros, their first championship in franchise history.

=== San Diego Padres ===
On February 23, 2020, Dozier signed a minor league contract with the San Diego Padres, with an invitation to spring training. Dozier was released by the Padres organization on July 11, 2020.

=== New York Mets ===
On July 22, 2020, Dozier signed a minor league deal with the New York Mets. On July 30, the Mets selected Dozier's contract to the 40-man roster. He was designated for assignment August 16. On August 23, the Mets officially released Dozier.

Dozier announced his retirement from professional baseball on February 18, 2021.

== Personal life ==
Dozier is married to Renee Dozier. They reside in Hattiesburg, Mississippi.

Dozier is a Christian. Dozier has spoken about his faith saying, "I'm a Christian just playing baseball on the side. That's what I stand for...". In November 2013, Dozier went with the mission group Amigos for Christ to Nicaragua for a week. While on the trip, Dozier helped dig a new clean water system for a small community and helped deliver a cow and a pig to the community for food.
