= 2015 Major League Baseball All-Star Game =

2015 American baseball competition

	1	2	3	4	5	6	7	8	9	R	H	E
American League	1	0	0	0	2	0	2	1	0	6	7	2
National League	0	1	0	0	0	1	0	0	1	3	6	0
- Date: July 14, 2015
- Venue: Great American Ball Park
- City: Cincinnati, Ohio
- Managers: Ned Yost (KC); Bruce Bochy (SF)
- MVP: Mike Trout (LAA)
- Attendance: 43,656
- Ceremonial first pitch: Sandy Koufax
- Television: Fox (United States); MLB International (International)
- TV announcers: Joe Buck, Harold Reynolds, Tom Verducci, Ken Rosenthal, and Erin Andrews (Fox); Matt Vasgersian and John Smoltz (MLB International)
- Radio: ESPN
- Radio announcers: Jon Sciambi and Chris Singleton

The 2015 Major League Baseball All-Star Game was the 86th edition of the Major League Baseball All-Star Game. The game was played at Great American Ball Park in Cincinnati, Ohio on Tuesday, July 14. It was televised nationally on Fox. The American League All-Stars defeated the National League All-Stars by a score of 6–3.

On January 21, 2013, then-Major League Baseball (MLB) Commissioner Bud Selig, announced the 2015 All-Star Game would be hosted by the Cincinnati Reds. This was the fifth time the Reds had hosted, which at the time tied them with the Cleveland Guardians, San Francisco Giants, Minnesota Twins, and Pittsburgh Pirates for the most All-Star Games hosted by a single franchise. It was also the first time the city of Cincinnati had hosted the All-Star Game since the 1988 All-Star Game was played at Riverfront Stadium.

On July 15, 2014, Selig also announced that Pete Rose would not be prohibited from participating in the 2015 All-Star Game ceremonies. Rose was an All-Star for 13 of the 19 seasons he played on the Reds and was a member of the Big Red Machine. In 1991, Rose was permanently banned from MLB for baseball betting. Rose, wearing a red sport coat, appeared on the field in front of the pitcher's mound before the game and received a standing ovation alongside former teammates Johnny Bench, Barry Larkin, and Joe Morgan.

On May 12, 2015, the Reds announced that Todd Frazier would serve as the 2015 All-Star Game spokesperson.

Mike Trout, an outfielder for the Los Angeles Angels, was named the All-Star Game Most Valuable Player for the second straight year.

== Fan balloting ==
=== Starters ===
Balloting for the 2015 All-Star Game starters began online April 23 and ended on July 2. The top vote-getters at each position (including the designated hitter for the American League) and the top three among outfielders, were named the starters for their respective leagues. The results were announced on July 5. A record 620 million votes were cast, surpassing the record of 391 million votes in 2012. Josh Donaldson was the leading vote-getter with 14,090,188 votes, breaking the record that Josh Hamilton set in 2012 with 11,073,744 votes. Bryce Harper set a new NL record for votes this year with 13,864,950 votes.

However, MLB canceled at least 65 million ballots on grounds of fraud and ballot stuffing. At one point during the balloting, the top vote-getters for eight of the starting nine positions for the American League were Kansas City Royals players.

=== Final roster spot ===
After the rosters were finalized, a second ballot of five players per league was created for the All-Star Final Vote to determine the 34th and final player of each roster. The online balloting were conducted from July 6 through July 10. Brett Gardner of the New York Yankees was removed from the ballot on July 9 after he replaced Alex Gordon on the roster due to injury. The winners of the All-Star Final Vote were Mike Moustakas of the Kansas City Royals (AL) and Carlos Martinez of the St. Louis Cardinals (NL).

Player	Team	Pos.	Player	Team	Pos.
American League			National League		
Xander Bogaerts	Red Sox	SS	Johnny Cueto	Reds	P
Yoenis Céspedes	Tigers	OF	Jeurys Familia	Mets	P
Brian Dozier	Twins	2B	Clayton Kershaw	Dodgers	P
Mike Moustakas	Royals	3B	Carlos Martinez	Cardinals	P
			Troy Tulowitzki	Rockies	SS

== Rosters ==
=== American League ===
Elected starters
Position	Player	Team	All-Star Games
C	Salvador Pérez	Royals	3
1B	Miguel Cabrera^{#}	Tigers	10
2B	Jose Altuve	Astros	3
3B	Josh Donaldson	Blue Jays	2
SS	Alcides Escobar	Royals	1
OF	Mike Trout	Angels	4
OF	Lorenzo Cain	Royals	1
OF	Alex Gordon^{#}	Royals	3
DH	Nelson Cruz	Mariners	4

Reserves
Position	Player	Team	All-Star Games
C	Russell Martin	Blue Jays	4
C	Stephen Vogt	Athletics	1
1B	Albert Pujols^{[C]}	Angels	10
1B	Mark Teixeira^{[D]}	Yankees	3
2B	Jason Kipnis	Indians	2
2B	Brian Dozier^{[G]}	Twins	1
3B	Manny Machado	Orioles	2
3B	Mike Moustakas	Royals	1
SS	José Iglesias	Tigers	1
OF	Brock Holt	Red Sox	1
OF	Adam Jones^{[F]}	Orioles	5
OF	José Bautista^{#}	Blue Jays	6
OF	Brett Gardner^{[E]}	Yankees	1
OF	J. D. Martinez	Tigers	1
DH	Prince Fielder	Rangers	6

Pitchers
Player	Team	All-Star Games
Chris Archer	Rays	1
Dellin Betances	Yankees	2
Brad Boxberger	Rays	1
Zach Britton	Orioles	1
Wade Davis	Royals	1
Sonny Gray^{#}	Athletics	1
Kelvin Herrera	Royals	1
Félix Hernández	Mariners	6
Dallas Keuchel	Astros	1
Darren O'Day	Orioles	1
Glen Perkins	Twins	3
David Price	Tigers	5
Chris Sale	White Sox	4
Hector Santiago^{[J]}	Angels	1

=== National League ===
Elected starters
Position	Player	Team	All-Star Games
C	Buster Posey	Giants	3
1B	Paul Goldschmidt	Diamondbacks	3
2B	Dee Gordon^{#}	Marlins	2
3B	Todd Frazier	Reds	2
SS	Jhonny Peralta	Cardinals	3
OF	Bryce Harper	Nationals	3
OF	Matt Holliday^{#}	Cardinals	7
OF	Giancarlo Stanton^{#}	Marlins	3

Reserves
Position	Player	Team	All-Star Games
C	Yasmani Grandal	Dodgers	1
C	Yadier Molina	Cardinals	7
1B	Adrián González	Dodgers	5
1B	Anthony Rizzo	Cubs	2
2B	Joe Panik	Giants	1
2B	DJ LeMahieu^{[H]}	Rockies	1
3B	Nolan Arenado	Rockies	1
3B	Kris Bryant^{[B]}	Cubs	1
SS	Brandon Crawford	Giants	1
SS	Troy Tulowitzki^{[I]}	Rockies	5
OF	Ryan Braun^{[M]}	Brewers	6
OF	Andrew McCutchen^{[A]}	Pirates	5
OF	Joc Pederson^{[L]}	Dodgers	1
OF	A. J. Pollock	Diamondbacks	1
OF	Justin Upton	Padres	3

Pitchers
Player	Team	All-Star Games
Madison Bumgarner	Giants	3
A. J. Burnett	Pirates	1
Aroldis Chapman	Reds	4
Gerrit Cole	Pirates	1
Jacob deGrom	Mets	1
Zack Greinke	Dodgers	3
Clayton Kershaw^{[K]}	Dodgers	5
Carlos Martinez	Cardinals	1
Mark Melancon	Pirates	2
Shelby Miller	Braves	1
Jonathan Papelbon	Phillies	6
Francisco Rodríguez	Brewers	6
Trevor Rosenthal	Cardinals	1
Max Scherzer^{#}	Nationals	3
Michael Wacha	Cardinals	1

1. Andrew McCutchen was named starter in place of Giancarlo Stanton due to injury.
2. Kris Bryant was named as the roster replacement for Stanton.
3. Albert Pujols was named starter in place of Miguel Cabrera due to injury.
4. Mark Teixeira was named as the roster replacement for Cabrera.
5. Brett Gardner was named as the roster replacement for Alex Gordon.
6. Adam Jones was named starter in place of Alex Gordon due to injury.
7. Brian Dozier was named as the roster replacement for José Bautista due to injury.
8. DJ LeMahieu was named starter in place of Dee Gordon due to injury.
9. Troy Tulowitzki was named as the roster replacement for Dee Gordon.
10. Hector Santiago was named as a replacement for Sonny Gray due to Gray starting on Sunday.
11. Clayton Kershaw was named as a replacement for Max Scherzer due to Scherzer starting on Sunday.
12. Joc Pederson was named starter in place of Matt Holliday due to injury.
13. Ryan Braun was named as a roster replacement for Holliday.

#: Indicates player would not play (replaced as per reference notes above).

== Game summary ==
Mike Trout of the Angels led off the game with a home run off Zack Greinke. The NL tied the score in the bottom of the second when Jhonny Peralta drove in Paul Goldschmidt with an RBI single off AL starter Dallas Keuchel. In the top of the fifth, Prince Fielder, who was pinch hitting for Nelson Cruz, hit a go-ahead RBI single off Dodgers ace Clayton Kershaw that scored Trout to give the AL a 2–1 lead. The next batter, Lorenzo Cain, hit an RBI double to score Albert Pujols to make it a 3–1 ballgame. In the bottom of the sixth, Andrew McCutchen homered off Chris Archer to make it a one-run game. In the top of the seventh, Trout walked and was lifted for pinch runner Brock Holt who scored on an RBI double by Manny Machado to give the AL a 4–2 lead. Machado then scored on a sac fly by Fielder to make it a 5–2 game. In the top of the eighth inning, the Twins' Brian Dozier hit a home run to make it a 6–2 ballgame. In the bottom of the ninth, Ryan Braun led off with a triple to right field off of Twins closer Glen Perkins, then scored on a sacrifice fly by Brandon Crawford to make it a 6–3 score. The next batter, Cubs rookie Kris Bryant, flied to right for the second out, and finally, Joe Panik lined out to left field to seal the AL's third straight victory and earn home-field advantage in the World Series.

=== Starting lineup ===
American				National			
Order	Player	Team	Position	Order	Player	Team	Position
1	Mike Trout	Angels	CF	1	Andrew McCutchen	Pirates	CF
2	Josh Donaldson	Blue Jays	3B	2	Todd Frazier	Reds	3B
3	Albert Pujols	Angels	1B	3	Bryce Harper	Nationals	RF
4	Nelson Cruz	Mariners	DH	4	Paul Goldschmidt	Diamondbacks	1B
5	Lorenzo Cain	Royals	RF	5	Buster Posey	Giants	C
6	Adam Jones	Orioles	LF	6	Anthony Rizzo	Cubs	DH
7	Salvador Pérez	Royals	C	7	Jhonny Peralta	Cardinals	SS
8	Jose Altuve	Astros	2B	8	Joc Pederson	Dodgers	LF
9	Alcides Escobar	Royals	SS	9	DJ LeMahieu	Rockies	2B
	Dallas Keuchel	Astros	P		Zack Greinke	Dodgers	P

=== Entertainment ===
The Canadian national anthem was sung by Columbus Blue Jackets anthem singer Leo Welsh. The American national anthem was sung by R&B singer Ciara, accompanied by three female backup singers. During the seventh inning stretch, country singer Josh Turner sang God Bless America.

=== Line score ===
Tuesday, July 14, 2015 8:32 pm (EDT) Great American Ball Park in Cincinnati, Ohio, 78 °F (26 °C), partly cloudy
Team	1	2	3	4	5	6	7	8	9	R	H	E
American League	1	0	0	0	2	0	2	1	0	6	7	2
National League	0	1	0	0	0	1	0	0	1	3	6	0
Starting pitchers: AL: Dallas Keuchel; NL: Zack Greinke; WP: David Price (1–0) LP: Clayton Kershaw (0–1); Home runs: AL: Mike Trout (1), Brian Dozier (1); NL: Andrew McCutchen (1); Attendance: 43,656 Time: 3:02; Umpires: Home Plate – Tim Welke; First Base – Jerry Meals; Second Base – Paul Schrieber; Third Base – Ron Kulpa; Left Field – James Hoye; Right Field – Alan Porter; Replay Official – Brian Gorman

== See also ==
- List of Major League Baseball All-Star Game winners
- All-Star Futures Game
- Home Run Derby
