= Chandler Bats =

American sporting goods manufacturer

Chandler Bats is an American sporting goods manufacturer company based in Port St. Lucie, Florida specializing in professional wood baseball bats primarily made from maple trees. Chandler Bats was originally founded in 2009 by David Chandler. On June 27, 2019, Yoenis Céspedes acquired the company after David Chandler filed for bankruptcy.

== History ==
Furniture maker David Chandler founded Chandler bats in 2009. David started RxSport in Germantown, Pennsylvania, and quickly began making bats in Norristown. In the first year that Chandler bats were available on the public market, they sold 11,000 bats out of a 40,000 sq ft (3,700 m^{2}) warehouse. Chandler has increased production every year since their opening. In 2013, the company received a $500,000 investment from Benjamin Franklin Technology Partners of Southeastern Pennsylvania for expansion. A large portion of these funds was put towards purchasing more raw materials, maple and ash wood, in an effort to further increase production of bats.
