= Estela Milanés =

Cuban softball player

Estela Milanés Salazar (born December 23, 1967) is a Cuban softball player.

Milanés appeared in the 2000 Summer Olympics, competing for Cuba. Her son is Yoenis Céspedes.
