= Ramón Tamayo =

Ramón Tamayo (1921–2008) was a Spanish producer, businessman and impresario. He was born in Granada in 1921 and died in Madrid on June 23, 2008.

== Career ==
Ramón Tamayo worked as a producer for nearly three decades in the Lope de Vega company, founded by his brother Joseph Tamayo in 1946, with which he toured the Spanish territory making known the new generation of foreign authors in Francoist Spain.

He directed the National Drama Centre between 1979 and 1981 along with actors Nuria Espert and José Luis Gómez. While the latter two were responsible for art direction, Tamayo took care of the inner workings, management and production. During his tenure, the center hosted around twenty shows such as Los baños de Argel (The Algiers baths), directed by Francisco Nieva; La velada en Benicarl, (Vigil in Benicarl) directed by ( Manuel Azaña).

With other companies he produced Sueño de una noche de verano (Dream of a summer's night), from Lindsay Kemp as well as debuting other plays in a national theater - the Theatre Lliure and the Els Joglars.

After a stint in the public theater, Tamayo returned to the private, back to the Lope de Vega company and the Fine Arts Theatre, where he directed with his brother until 2003, when his brother died. Ramón Tamayo died five years later in Madrid at the age of 87 years.
