= 2013 Major League Baseball Home Run Derby =

Baseball competition

- Date: July 15, 2013
- Venue: Citi Field
- City: Queens, New York
- Winner: Yoenis Céspedes

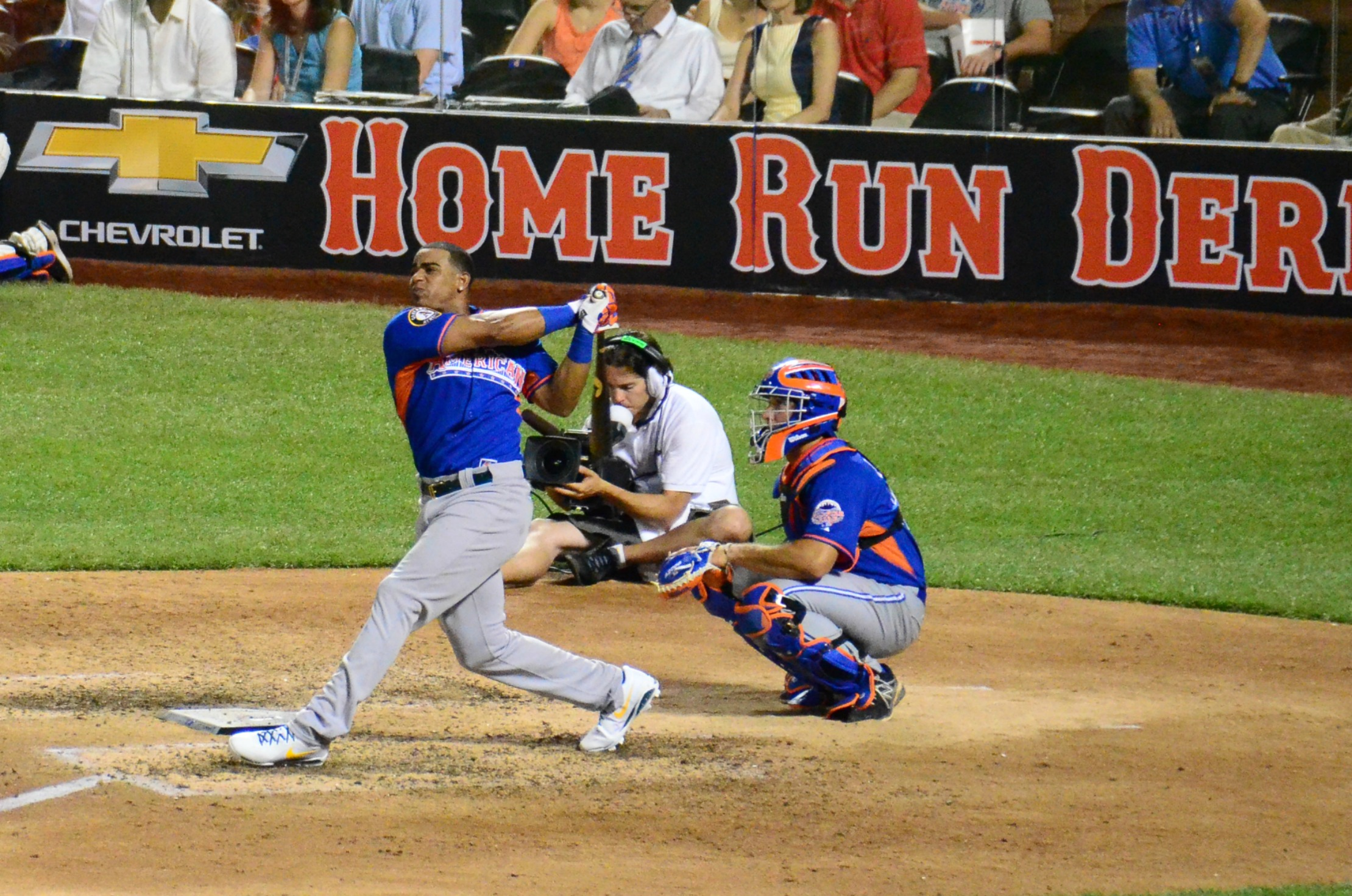
Yoenis Céspedes follows through on a swing at the 2013 Home Run Derby

The 2013 Major League Baseball Home Run Derby (known through sponsorship as the Chevrolet Home Run Derby) was a home run hitting contest in Major League Baseball (MLB) between four batters each from the National League and American League. The derby was held on July 15, 2013, at the site of the 2013 MLB All-Star Game, Citi Field in New York City.

In June, MLB named Robinson Canó of the New York Yankees and David Wright of the New York Mets the Home Run Derby team captains. On July 8 and 9, the captains each picked three other players to compete with them. The AL team captain, Canó, selected Yoenis Céspedes of the Oakland Athletics, Chris Davis of the Baltimore Orioles, and Prince Fielder of the Detroit Tigers. The NL team captain, Wright, selected Michael Cuddyer and Carlos González of the Colorado Rockies, and Bryce Harper of the Washington Nationals. González then withdrew due to a sprained finger and was replaced by Pedro Álvarez of the Pittsburgh Pirates.

Céspedes hit 32 total home runs and won the competition by defeating Harper in the final round. Céspedes was the first winner of the event who had not been selected to that year's All-Star Game.

== Results ==
Citi Field, New York (AL – 53, NL – 50)
Player	Team	Round 1	Round 2	Subtotal	Finals	Total
Yoenis Céspedes	Athletics	**17**	6	**23**	**9**^{[b]}	**32**
Bryce Harper	Nationals	8	**8**	16	8	24
Michael Cuddyer	Rockies	7	**8**	15	—	15
Chris Davis	Orioles	8	4	12	—	12
Pedro Álvarez^{[a]}	Pirates	6	—	6	—	6
Prince Fielder	Tigers	5	—	5	—	5
David Wright	Mets	5	—	5	—	5
Robinson Canó	Yankees	4	—	4	—	4

Bolded numbers denote round leader.

a.Álvarez replaced Carlos González of the Rockies, who withdrew due to injury

b.Ended round with 5 outs
