= Josh Donaldson =

American baseball player (born 1985)

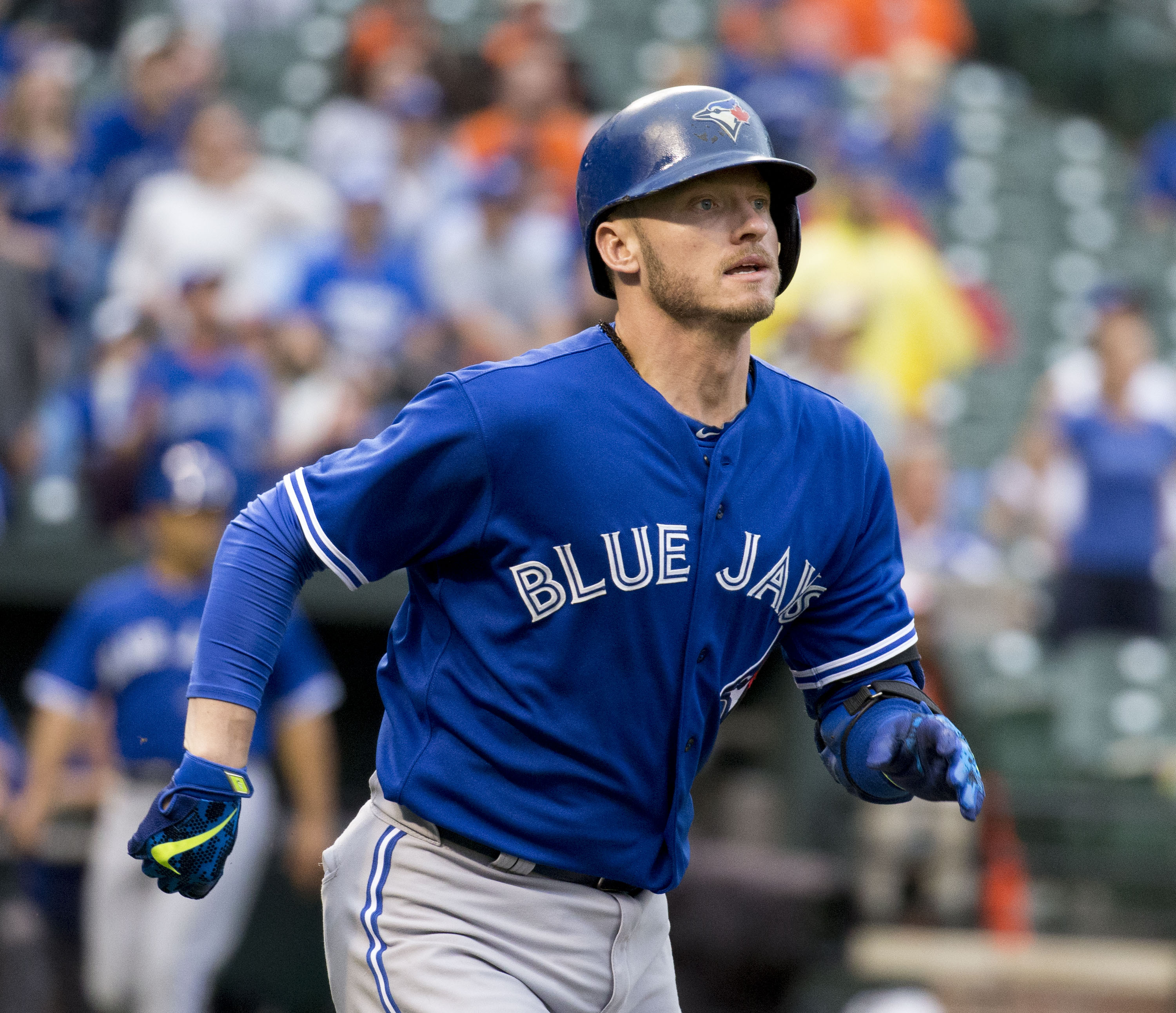
- Donaldson with the Toronto Blue Jays in 2015
- Third baseman
- Born: December 8, 1985 (age 40); Pensacola, Florida, U.S.
- Batted: Right Threw: Right

MLB debut
- April 30, 2010, for the Oakland Athletics

Last MLB appearance
- October 1, 2023, for the Milwaukee Brewers

MLB statistics
- Batting average: .261
- Home runs: 279
- Runs batted in: 816
- Stats at Baseball Reference

Teams
- Oakland Athletics (2010, 2012–2014); Toronto Blue Jays (2015–2018); Cleveland Indians (2018); Atlanta Braves (2019); Minnesota Twins (2020–2021); New York Yankees (2022–2023); Milwaukee Brewers (2023)

Career highlights and awards
- 3× All-Star (2014–2016); AL MVP (2015); 2× Silver Slugger Award (2015, 2016); AL Hank Aaron Award (2015); NL Comeback Player of the Year (2019); AL RBI leader (2015)

Joshua Adam Donaldson (born December 8, 1985) is an American former professional baseball third baseman. In his 13-year Major League Baseball (MLB) career, he played for the Oakland Athletics, Toronto Blue Jays, Cleveland Indians, Atlanta Braves, Minnesota Twins, New York Yankees, and Milwaukee Brewers.

The Chicago Cubs drafted Donaldson in the 2007 MLB draft after he had played college baseball at Auburn University. He made his MLB debut with the Athletics in 2010 as a catcher. Donaldson progressed with the team, switched positions to third base, and eventually became an All-Star in 2014.

Donaldson was traded to the Blue Jays following the 2014 season. He was named as a starter to the 2015 MLB All-Star Game, earning the most fan votes obtained by a player in the process, and was voted the American League's Most Valuable Player in 2015. Donaldson also won the Silver Slugger Award and led the American League in RBIs (runs batted in) and runs scored that year.

Donaldson was traded to the Indians in August 2018, signed with the Braves for the 2019 season, signed a four-year deal with the Twins in January 2020, was traded to the Yankees in March 2022, was released by the Yankees in August 2023, and spent the rest of the 2023 season with the Brewers before retiring in March 2024.

In 2026, Donaldson was inducted into the Auburn Baseball Wall of Fame at Plainsman Park. Donaldson became the first inductee since the four inaugural members were added in 2010.

== Early life ==
Joshua Adam Donaldson was born on December 8, 1985, in Pensacola, Florida. He was raised by his mother, Lisa French, while his father, Levon Donaldson, was imprisoned for most of his childhood. A construction worker, Levon Donaldson was sentenced in 1992 on charges of sexual battery, false imprisonment, and aggravated battery; he was released from prison in 2007.

When Donaldson was 18 months old, he appeared on a local TV station showing off a "picture perfect" golf swing. Donaldson grew up an Atlanta Braves fan.

Donaldson attended Pace High School in Pace, Florida for his sophomore year and played varsity baseball. His mother, Lisa, moved him to Faith Academy in Mobile, Alabama to reunite him with his friend, P. J. Walters, at the academy. At Faith, Donaldson competed in football, basketball, and baseball. As a shortstop and pitcher, Donaldson was the Alabama Gatorade Player of the Year as a senior, batting .515 on the season, and led Faith Academy to a state title. Donaldson set four Faith Academy single-season records in baseball, hits (55), triples (6), doubles (21), and RBIs (54). In football, Donaldson was a wide receiver, defensive back, and punter, setting a school record with 11 interceptions in one season as a senior.

== College career ==
Donaldson enrolled at Auburn University, where he played college baseball as a catcher and third baseman for the Auburn Tigers baseball team in the Southeastern Conference. During his freshman season in 2005, Donaldson started 39 games at third base, hitting .294 with seven home runs, and also began learning to play catcher. In his sophomore season, Donaldson hit .276 and led the team with ten home runs; he also threw out 15 of 38 base stealers and had seven pickoffs. In the summer of 2006, Donaldson played for the Harwich Mariners of the Cape Cod Baseball League where he was an All-Star and hit .302. In 2007, Donaldson was named a Louisville Slugger Preseason All-American.

== Professional career ==
=== Draft and minor leagues ===
The Chicago Cubs drafted Donaldson as a catcher in the first round (48th overall) of the 2007 Major League Baseball draft. In his first minor league season Donaldson played 53 games for the Rookie Arizona League Cubs and Short Season-A Boise Hawks, batting a combined .335 with nine home runs and 25 RBIs. He also walked more than he struck out, with 39 and 38 respectively. In 2008, he played 63 games with the Class-A Peoria Chiefs, where he hit .217 with six home runs and 23 RBIs.

In July 2008, the Cubs traded Donaldson, Matt Murton, Eric Patterson, and Sean Gallagher to the Oakland Athletics for Rich Harden and Chad Gaudin. He played 47 games with the Advanced-A Stockton Ports, where he batted .330 and had nine home runs and 39 RBIs. Donaldson then played the entire 2009 season with the Double-A Midland RockHounds, and recorded a batting average of .270 with nine home runs and 91 RBIs.

=== Oakland Athletics (2010, 2012–2014) ===
Donaldson was called up to the majors for the first time on April 30, 2010, filling in for injured catcher Kurt Suzuki. He made his debut that night as a pinch hitter, and struck out. The next day, he recorded his first major league hit, a two-run home run on the first pitch by Toronto Blue Jays pitcher Dana Eveland. In 14 games played during the 2010 season, Donaldson made 34 plate appearances and recorded five hits. After returning to the minor leagues, he spent the season with the Triple-A Sacramento River Cats and hit .238 with 18 home runs and 67 RBIs for the season. Donaldson played the entire 2011 season in Sacramento, improving his average to .261, and hit 17 home runs and 70 RBIs.

Donaldson officially converted to third base from catching in the beginning of the 2012 season during spring training. He started the regular season as the everyday third baseman for the A's for the first half, but due to struggles he was sent to the Triple-A Sacramento River Cats for much of the season. The A's recalled him in mid August after everyday third baseman Brandon Inge was placed on the 15-day disabled list with an injured arm. Donaldson helped the A's into making the postseason, and finished the 2012 season with nine home runs, 33 RBIs and a .241 average.

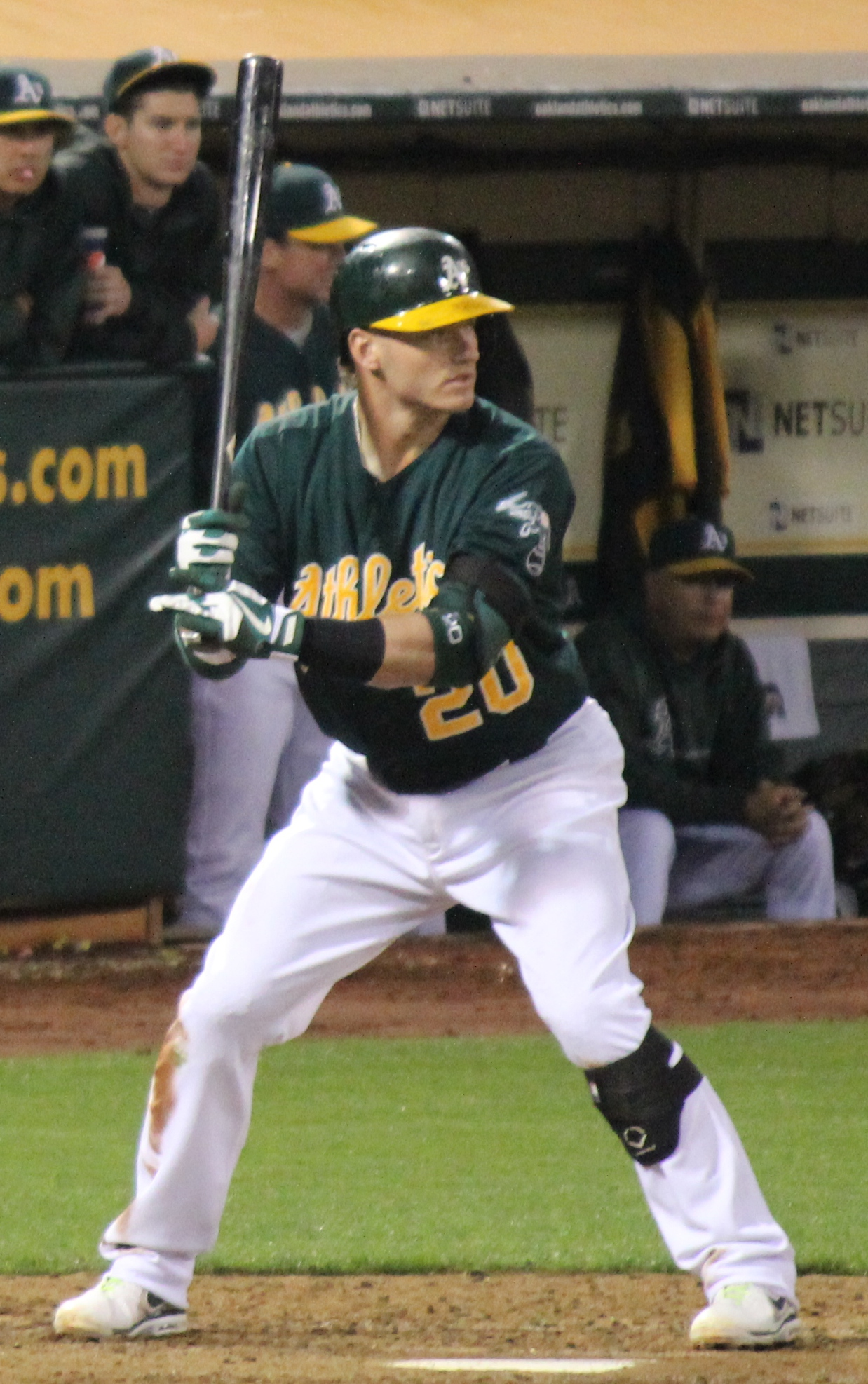
Donaldson with the Oakland Athletics in 2013

Against Detroit Tigers reliever Brayan Villarreal, Donaldson hit his first career walk-off home run on April 12, 2013. It was the A's first walk-off win in 2013. He hit his first career grand slam on June 7 against Chicago White Sox starter Chris Sale. Major League Baseball named Donaldson the American League Player of the Month for September after batting .337 with 20 runs scored, eight doubles, five home runs and 16 RBIs in 25 games. He played 158 games and finished the season with 24 home runs, 93 RBIs and a .301 average and placed fourth in AL MVP voting.

Donaldson was elected to his first All-Star appearance in 2014 as the starter at third base for the American League. Donaldson hit a three-run walk-off home run in the ninth inning against the Baltimore Orioles on July 17 to lead the A's to a 5–4 victory. Donaldson won his first career Fielding Bible Award for his work at third base. During the 2014 season, Donaldson hit 98 RBIs, 29 home runs, and 93 runs scored, beating out his career highs with Oakland. However, Donaldson's batting average went down to .255. Donaldson would end up finishing 8th in the AL MVP voting.

=== Toronto Blue Jays (2015–2018) ===
==== 2015 ====
On November 28, 2014, the Athletics traded Donaldson to the Toronto Blue Jays for Brett Lawrie, Kendall Graveman, Sean Nolin, and Franklin Barreto. The following February, he lost his salary arbitration case against the Blue Jays after seeking $5.75 million. Instead, he was awarded the Blue Jays' offer of $4.3 million for the 2015 season.

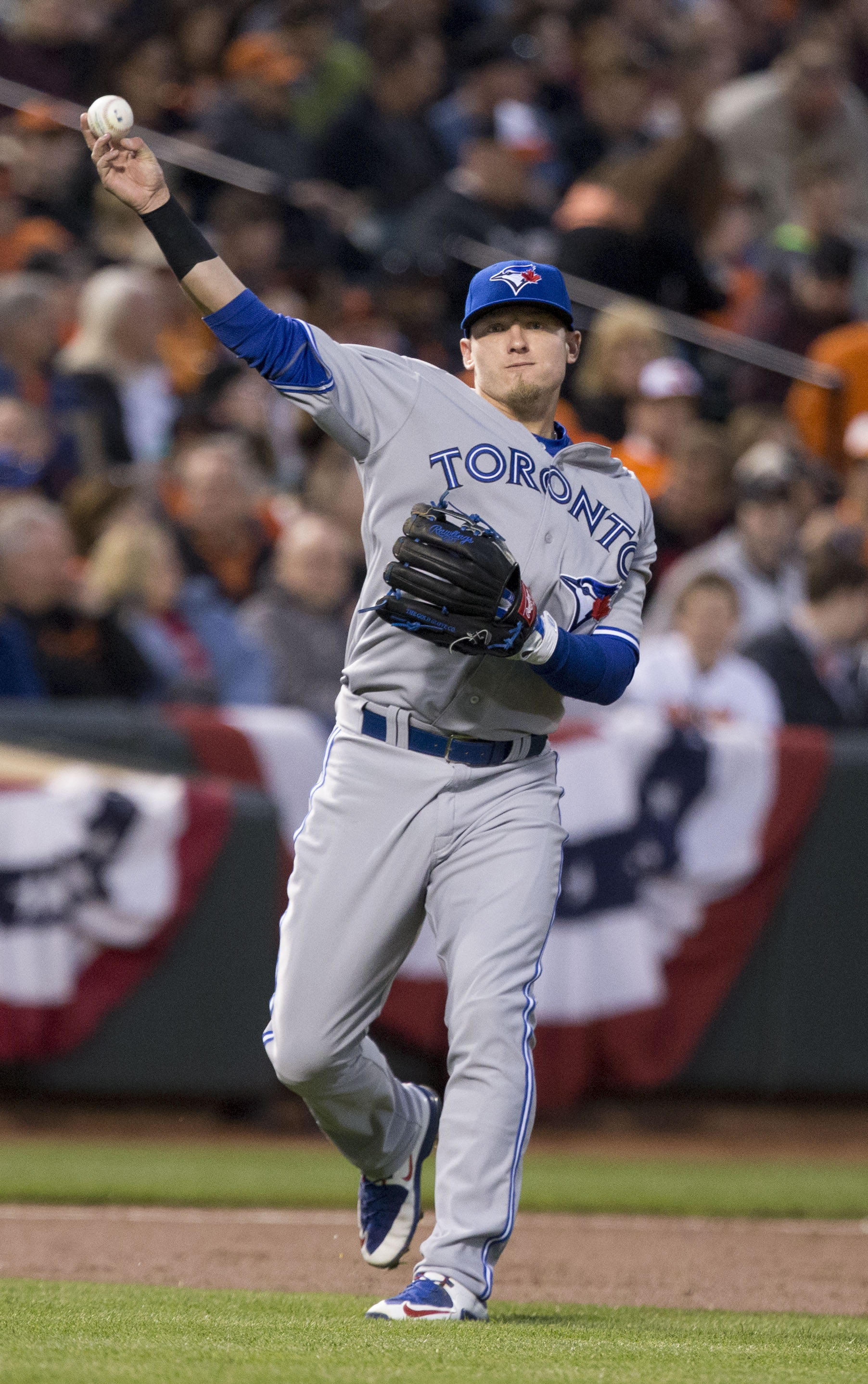
Donaldson fielding in April 2015

On June 1, Donaldson was named the American League Player of the Week for the second time in his career. From May 25–31, he batted .440 with 11 runs scored, six home runs, and 11 RBIs. A campaign was launched in early June to elect Donaldson as a starter to the 2015 MLB All-Star Game, which was led by Don Cherry and Stephen Amell. At the time the campaign began, Mike Moustakas of the Kansas City Royals led voting for third basemen. It was announced in a voting update on June 29 that Donaldson had surpassed Moustakas, and on July 5, was announced as the starting third baseman for the All-Star game, with a record 14,090,188 votes. He participated in the Home Run Derby on July 13, losing in the semi-finals to eventual winner Todd Frazier.

From August 3–9, he batted .385 (10 hits in 26 at bats) with two doubles, five home runs, eight RBIs and nine runs scored as the Blue Jays won eight games in a row. This performance led to his second AL Player of the Week Award of the season.

By the end of August, observers began referring to Donaldson's season as one of the best in Blue Jays' history. Several members of the media wrote articles naming him as the American League Most Valuable Player Award frontrunner over Mike Trout, and fans attending both home and away games began chanting "M-V-P! M-V-P!" when he would bat. On September 7, Donaldson hit his 100th career home run. He hit his 40th home run of the season on September 25, and in doing so, joined Shawn Green and Carlos Delgado as the only players in franchise history to have 40 doubles and 40 home runs in the same season. Donaldson finished the 2015 regular season with a .297 batting average, 122 runs scored, 41 doubles, 41 home runs, and 123 RBIs. According to Baseball-Reference.com, his 8.8 Wins Above Replacement (WAR) in 2015 ranked as the highest single-season total in club history, surpassing José Bautista's previous record of 8.1 in 2011.

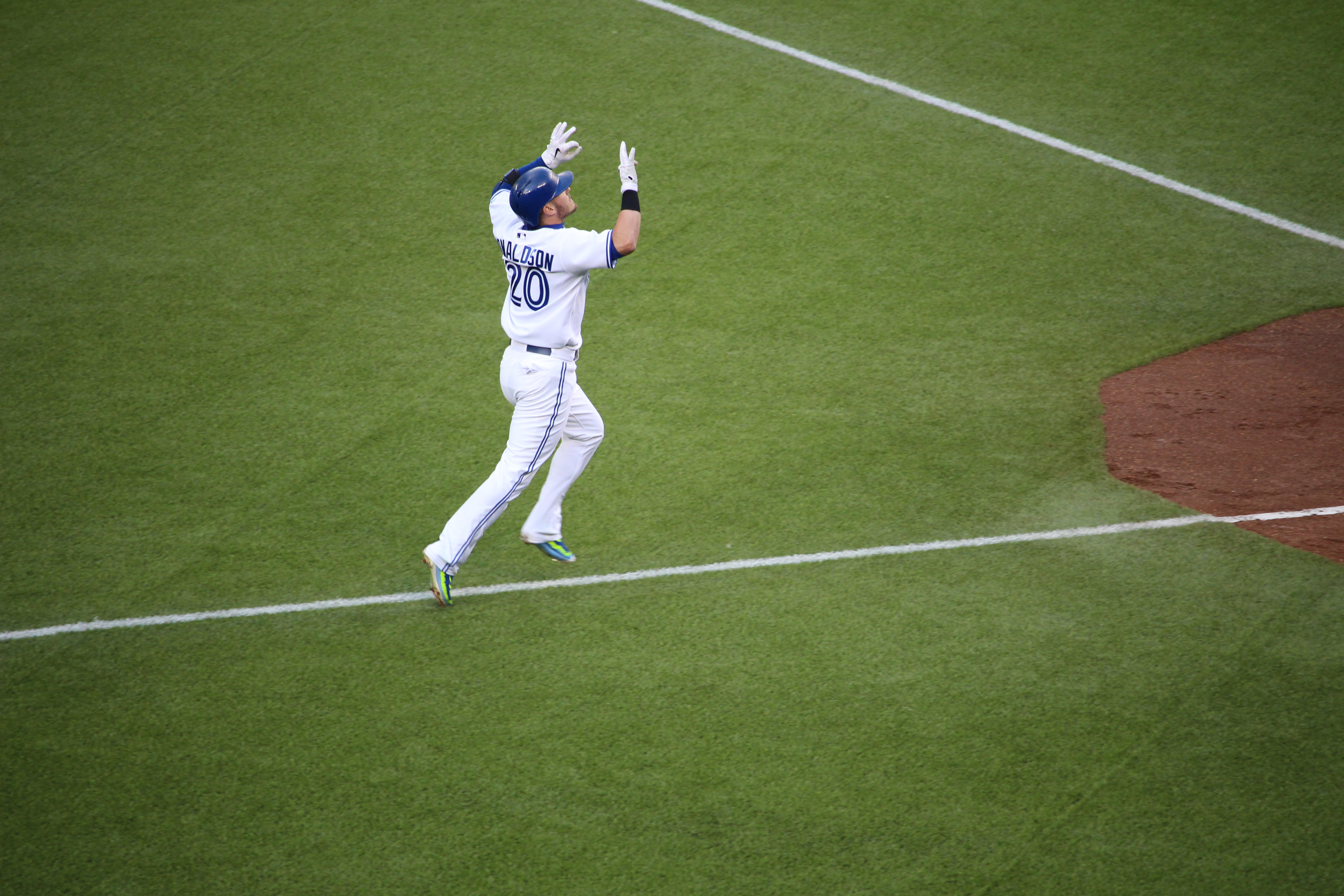
Josh Donaldson Victory Salute

Sporting News announced on October 29, 2015, that Donaldson had won their MLB Player of the Year Award. Other awards included the American League Hank Aaron Award, the American League third baseman's Silver Slugger Award, and Players Choice Awards for both Major League Player of the Year and American League Outstanding Player. On November 19, 2015, Donaldson was named the 2015 American League Most Valuable Player (AL MVP), finishing ahead of Mike Trout and Lorenzo Cain. On December 5, 2015, Donaldson was revealed as the cover athlete for MLB The Show 16.

==== 2016 ====
In February 2016, Donaldson and the Blue Jays appeared to be heading to salary arbitration for the second consecutive year. Donaldson had asked for $11.8 million for the 2016 season, while the Blue Jays had countered at $11.35 million. On February 10, Donaldson signed a two-year, $28.65 million extension that paid him $11.65 million in 2016 and $17 million in 2017.

In the first half of 2016, Donaldson resumed the high level of play from his MVP season. He won the June 19 Player of the Week Award after hitting three home runs, four doubles, one triple and nine runs driven in with 12 hits in 27 at bats. He led the league in total bases (27), extra-base hits (8) and tied for first in slugging percentage (1.000). On July 7, he was announced as a reserve for the American League in the 2016 All-Star Game. Heading into the All-Star break, Donaldson was batting .304 with 23 home runs and 63 RBIs. He had also scored 80 runs, which made him the first player in Blue Jays history to do so before the All-Star break. On August 28, Donaldson hit three home runs in a game for the first time in his career, leading the Blue Jays to a 9–6 win and a sweep of the Minnesota Twins. Donaldson finished the 2016 regular season with a .284 batting average, 37 home runs, and 99 RBI.

Despite struggling with a hip injury late in the season, Donaldson played very well in the Jays' division series with the Texas Rangers, the second consecutive season Toronto faced Texas in the playoffs. In the three game sweep, he hit for a .500 batting average, five doubles, .526 on-base percentage, .778 slugging percentage, four runs scored and three RBI. He also scored the series-winning run in the tenth inning in dramatic fashion, scampering home from second base on a heads-up base running play following a throwing error by Rangers' second baseman Rougned Odor. Donaldson was awarded his second consecutive Silver Slugger Award on November 10. He finished fourth in American League MVP voting.

==== 2017 ====
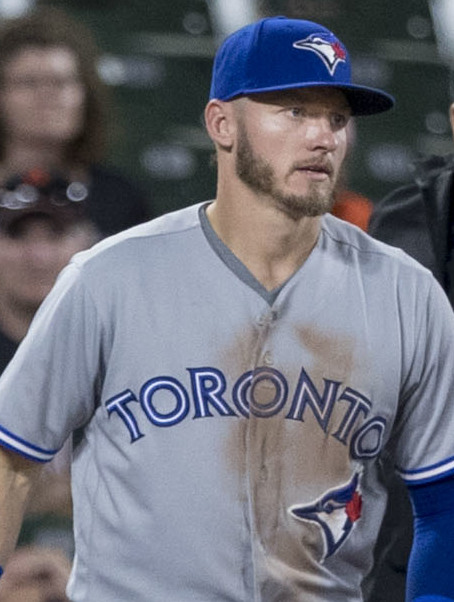
Donaldson in 2017

On April 13, 2017, Donaldson left the game after straining his right calf, and was placed on the 10-day disabled list the following day. He returned to the lineup in late May. From August 1 to the end of the 2017 season, Donaldson hit .302 with 22 home runs in 227 plate appearances.

==== 2018 ====
On January 12, 2018, Donaldson avoided salary arbitration with the Blue Jays by agreeing to a one-year, $23 million contract for the 2018 season.

On March 30, it was revealed that Donaldson was diagnosed with dead arm syndrome, in which he was criticized for his awkward throws on opening day. Although the issue was not too serious, the Blue Jays decided to use Donaldson temporarily as a designated hitter. On April 13, he was placed on the 10-day disabled list for shoulder inflammation. His return to action was cemented with a two-RBI double which was critical in ensuring a 13–9 win over the Cleveland Indians. However, Donaldson returned to the 10-day disabled list on June 1 after suffering a calf strain. While on rehab assignment on June 26, he re-aggravated the calf strain and was eventually transferred to the 60-day disabled list.

=== Cleveland Indians (2018) ===
On August 31, 2018, the Blue Jays traded Donaldson to the Cleveland Indians for a player to be named later, later revealed to be pitching prospect Julian Merryweather. Donaldson wore the number 27 as number 20 is retired in honor of Frank Robinson. On September 3, he was placed on the 10-day disabled list due to a left calf strain, and sent to the Triple-A Columbus Clippers on a rehab assignment, where he hit a grand slam in his first rehab game. The Indians activated Donaldson from the disabled list on September 11, 2018. Donaldson made his Indians debut that evening, starting at third base and batting fifth.

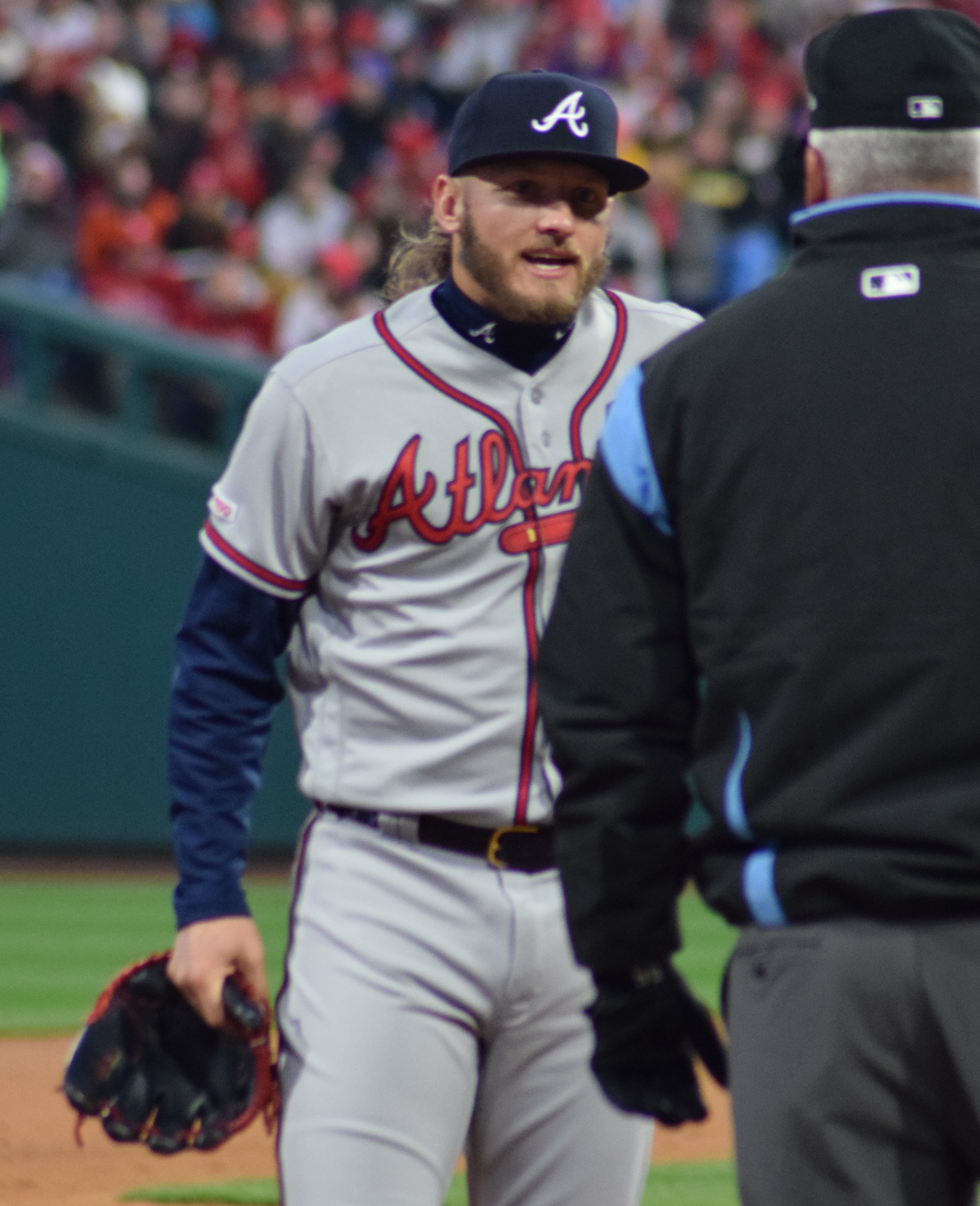
Donaldson with the Braves in 2019

=== Atlanta Braves (2019) ===
On November 26, 2018, Donaldson signed a one-year, $23 million contract with the Atlanta Braves. Donaldson batted .259/.379/.521 with 37 home runs and 94 RBIs in 2019. He made contact with the lowest percentage of pitches he swung at in the strike zone (76.6%) of all NL batters. On defense in 2019, he had a 15 Defensive Runs Saved (DRS) rating, the best in the National League among third basemen. He was named the 2019 NL Comeback Player of the Year.

=== Minnesota Twins (2020–2021) ===
On January 22, 2020, Donaldson signed a four-year $92 million contract with the Minnesota Twins. In his first season with the Twins, Donaldson was limited to 28 games in the shortened 60-game season because of injury. He hit .222 with six home runs and 11 RBIs. In October 2020, Donaldson tweeted his opinion that umpire John Tumpane was a "Top 3 worst ump in the game," adding "Trust me this guy has no idea what the zone is in the rule book."

On January 31, 2021, Donaldson changed his number from 24, which he used in his first year in Minnesota, to his customary 20, vacated by the recently departed Eddie Rosario. On May 29, Donaldson scored the 2,000,000th run in MLB history when he scored on a ground-rule double hit by Nelson Cruz off Kansas City Royals pitcher Ervin Santana.

=== New York Yankees (2022–2023) ===
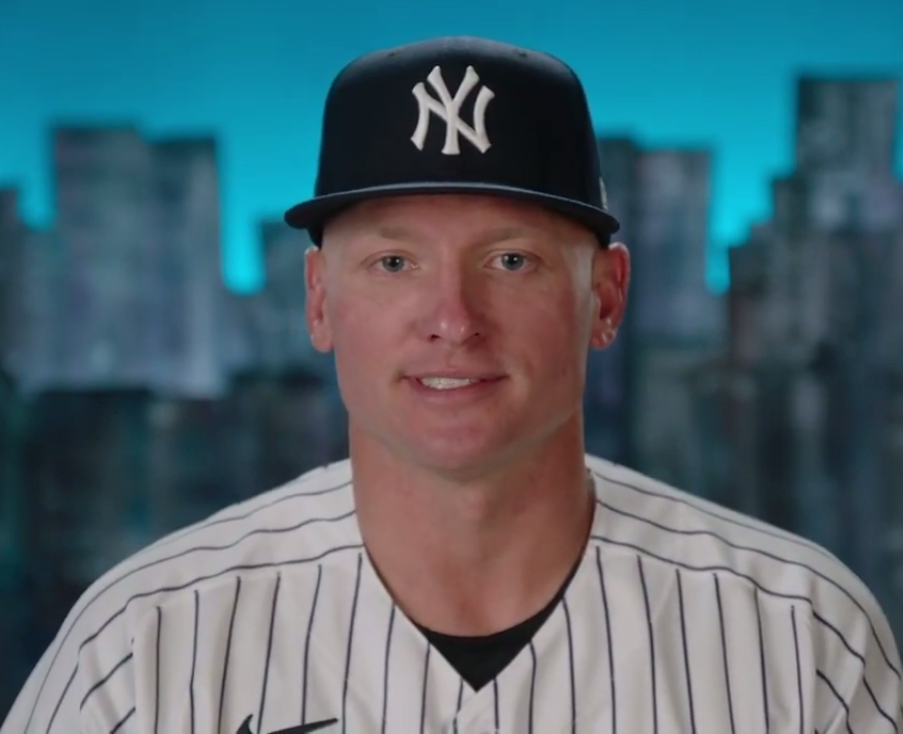
Donaldson with the Yankees in 2022

On March 13, 2022, the Twins traded Donaldson, Isiah Kiner-Falefa, and Ben Rortvedt to the New York Yankees in exchange for Gary Sánchez and Gio Urshela. On May 23, MLB suspended Donaldson for one game for making what they determined to be a "disrespectful" comment made "in poor judgement" toward Tim Anderson, after Donaldson called him "Jackie" in reference to a 2019 Anderson interview. On August 17, Donaldson hit a walk-off grand slam in the tenth inning during a game against the Tampa Bay Rays, winning the game 8–7. He became only the third Yankees player with a walk-off ultimate grand slam in Yankees franchise history, following Babe Ruth (1926) and Jason Giambi (2002).

In 2022, he batted .222/.308/.374 with 15 home runs and 62 RBIs, and made contact with only 75.5% of all pitches he swung at in the strike zone, the lowest percentage in the major leagues.

In 2023, Donaldson hit .142 with 10 home runs and 15 RBIs across 33 games before he was placed on the injured list with a right calf strain on July 16. The next day, it was reported that Donaldson could miss the remainder of the season with the injury, and he was transferred to the 60–day injured list on July 21 before being released on August 29.

=== Milwaukee Brewers (2023) ===
On August 31, 2023, Donaldson signed a minor league contract with the Milwaukee Brewers organization and was assigned to the Triple–A Nashville Sounds. After hitting .177 in 5 games for Nashville, Donaldson was selected to Milwaukee's major league roster on September 11. In 17 games for the Brewers, Donaldson hit .169/.290/.390 with 3 home runs and 11 RBI. He became a free agent following the season.

On March 4, 2024, Donaldson announced his retirement from baseball.

== Awards and accomplishments ==
Awards

- American League Most Valuable Player Award (2015)
- Hank Aaron Award (2015)
- 2× Home Run Derby participant (2014, 2015)
- Fielding Bible Award (2014)
- 3× MLB All-Star (2014–16)
- MLB Player of the Month (September 2013)
- 4× MLB Player of the Week (April 28, 2013; May 31, 2015; August 9, 2015; June 19, 2016)
- Players Choice Awards for American League Outstanding Player (2015)
- Players Choice Awards for Major League Player of the Year (2015)
- 2× Silver Slugger Award at third base (2015, 2016)
- Sporting News Major League Player of the Year (2015)

Accomplishments

- Blue Jays' record for highest single-season total WAR (8.8 in 2015)
- Blue Jays' record for most runs scored before All-Star break (80 in 2016)
- 3-home run game (August 28, 2016)
- MLB's 2 millionth run scored (May 29, 2021)
- The 31st ultimate grand slam in MLB history.

== Personal life ==
Donaldson's father watched him play baseball in person for the first time on September 13, 2013, against the Texas Rangers in Arlington, Texas. Donaldson walked twice and hit a home run as well as a double in three at-bats as the Athletics won, 9–8.

Donaldson is a lifelong avid golfer. He appeared on the Golf Channel during the 2014 season and hit a ball an estimated 309 yards in a simulator.

Donaldson is a fan of the History channel series Vikings, and in January 2016, it was announced he would have a guest appearance in the fourth season of the show as "Hoskuld". Donaldson's nickname, "The Bringer of Rain", was inspired by the "Shadow Games" episode of Spartacus: Blood and Sand.

Donaldson and his fiancé, Briana Miller, had their first child, a daughter, in November 2020. The couple married in January 2024, with Donaldson making the news public following his retirement.

== See also ==
- List of Major League Baseball annual runs batted in leaders
- List of Major League Baseball annual runs scored leaders
- List of Major League Baseball career home run leaders
- List of Major League Baseball career OPS leaders
- List of Major League Baseball career slugging percentage leaders
- List of Major League Baseball ultimate grand slams
- List of Toronto Blue Jays team records
- Toronto Blue Jays award winners and league leaders
