= 2014 Major League Baseball All-Star Game =

2014 American baseball competition

	1	2	3	4	5	6	7	8	9	R	H	E
National League	0	2	0	1	0	0	0	0	0	3	8	1
American League	3	0	0	0	2	0	0	0	X	5	7	0
- Date: July 15, 2014
- Venue: Target Field
- City: Minneapolis, Minnesota
- Managers: Mike Matheny (STL); John Farrell (BOS)
- MVP: Mike Trout (LAA)
- Attendance: 41,048
- Ceremonial first pitch: Rod Carew
- Television: Fox (United States); MLB International (International)
- TV announcers: Joe Buck, Harold Reynolds, Tom Verducci, Ken Rosenthal and Erin Andrews (Fox); Gary Thorne and Rick Sutcliffe (MLB International)
- Radio: ESPN
- Radio announcers: Jon Sciambi and Chris Singleton

The 2014 Major League Baseball All-Star Game was the 85th edition of the Major League Baseball All-Star Game, held at Target Field in Minneapolis, Minnesota, the home of the Minnesota Twins. This was the third All-Star Game played in the Twin Cities; Metropolitan Stadium hosted the game in 1965, while the Hubert H. Humphrey Metrodome hosted the game in 1985. It was televised in the United States on Fox as part of a new eight-year deal. In preparation for the game the Twin Cities' transit company, MetroTransit, completed the new METRO Green Line light-rail between downtown Minneapolis and downtown Saint Paul, and began service on June 14, 2014.

== Host selection ==
The Chicago Cubs were the only other team that made a bid for hosting the 2014 All-Star Game. Typically the leagues alternate hosts every year, except for 2006, 2007, 2015 and 2016, which were hosted by the Pittsburgh Pirates, San Francisco Giants, Cincinnati Reds and San Diego Padres, respectively. With 2014 being the American League's turn, Chicago made a bid hoping an exception would be made for the National League Cubs in order to honor the centennial of Wrigley Field (which last hosted an All-Star Game in 1990).

== Fan balloting ==
=== Starters ===
Balloting for the 2014 All-Star Game starters began online April 23 and ended on July 2. The top vote-getters at each position (including the designated hitter for the American League) and the top three among outfielders, were named the starters for their respective leagues. The results were announced on July 6.

=== Final roster spot ===
After the rosters were finalized, a second ballot of five players per league was created for the All-Star Final Vote to determine the 34th and final player of each roster. The online balloting was conducted from July 5 through July 9.

Player	Team	Pos.	Player	Team	Pos.
American League			National League		
Dallas Keuchel	Astros	P	Casey McGehee	Marlins	3B
Corey Kluber	Indians	P	Justin Morneau	Rockies	1B
Rick Porcello	Tigers	P	Anthony Rendon	Nationals	2B
Garrett Richards	Angels	P	Anthony Rizzo	Cubs	1B
Chris Sale	White Sox	P	Justin Upton	Braves	OF

== Rosters ==
Players in italics have since been inducted into the National Baseball Hall of Fame.

=== American League ===
Elected starters
Position	Player	Team	All-Star Games
C	Matt Wieters^{#}	Orioles	3
1B	Miguel Cabrera	Tigers	9
2B	Robinson Canó	Mariners	6
3B	Josh Donaldson	Athletics	1
SS	Derek Jeter	Yankees	14
OF	José Bautista	Blue Jays	5
OF	Mike Trout	Angels	3
OF	Adam Jones	Orioles	4
DH	Nelson Cruz	Orioles	3

Reserves
Position	Player	Team	All-Star Games
C	Salvador Pérez^{[A]}	Royals	2
C	Derek Norris	Athletics	1
C	Kurt Suzuki^{[B]}	Twins	1
1B	José Abreu	White Sox	1
1B	Brandon Moss	Athletics	1
2B	Jose Altuve	Astros	2
2B	Ian Kinsler^{[I]}	Tigers	4
3B	Adrián Beltré	Rangers	4
3B	Kyle Seager^{[D]}	Mariners	1
SS	Alexei Ramírez	White Sox	1
SS	Erick Aybar^{[F]}	Angels	1
OF	Yoenis Céspedes	Athletics	1
OF	Michael Brantley	Indians	1
OF	Alex Gordon^{#}	Royals	2
DH	Edwin Encarnación^{#}	Blue Jays	2
DH	Víctor Martínez^{#}	Tigers	5

Pitchers
Player	Team	All-Star Games
Dellin Betances	Yankees	1
Mark Buehrle	Blue Jays	5
Yu Darvish	Rangers	3
Sean Doolittle	Athletics	1
Félix Hernández	Mariners	5
Greg Holland	Royals	2
Jon Lester	Red Sox	3
Scott Kazmir	Athletics	3
Glen Perkins	Twins	2
David Price^{#}	Rays	4
Fernando Rodney^{[K]}	Mariners	2
Chris Sale	White Sox	3
Max Scherzer	Tigers	2
Masahiro Tanaka^{#}	Yankees	1
Koji Uehara^{[E]}	Red Sox	1

=== National League ===
Elected starters
Position	Player	Team	All-Star Games
C	Yadier Molina^{#}	Cardinals	6
1B	Paul Goldschmidt	Diamondbacks	2
2B	Chase Utley	Phillies	6
3B	Aramis Ramírez	Brewers	3
SS	Troy Tulowitzki	Rockies	4
OF	Andrew McCutchen	Pirates	4
OF	Carlos Gómez	Brewers	2
OF	Yasiel Puig	Dodgers	1
DH	Giancarlo Stanton	Marlins	2

Reserves
Position	Player	Team	All-Star Games
C	Jonathan Lucroy^{[H]}	Brewers	1
C	Devin Mesoraco	Reds	1
C	Miguel Montero^{[G]}	Diamondbacks	2
1B	Freddie Freeman	Braves	2
1B	Anthony Rizzo	Cubs	1
2B	Dee Gordon	Dodgers	1
2B	Daniel Murphy	Mets	1
SS	Starlin Castro	Cubs	3
3B	Matt Carpenter^{#}	Cardinals	2
3B	Todd Frazier	Reds	1
OF	Charlie Blackmon	Rockies	1
OF	Josh Harrison	Pirates	1
OF	Hunter Pence	Giants	3

Pitchers
Player	Team	All-Star Games
Henderson Álvarez^{#}^{[J]}	Marlins	1
Madison Bumgarner^{#}	Giants	2
Aroldis Chapman	Reds	3
Tyler Clippard^{[N]}	Nationals	2
Johnny Cueto^{#}	Reds	1
Clayton Kershaw	Dodgers	4
Zack Greinke	Dodgers	2
Tim Hudson^{#}^{[M]}	Giants	4
Craig Kimbrel	Braves	4
Pat Neshek	Cardinals	1
Francisco Rodriguez	Brewers	5
Tyson Ross^{#}	Padres	1
Jeff Samardzija^{#}^{[C]}	Cubs	1
Alfredo Simón^{[L]}	Reds	1
Huston Street^{#}^{[O]}	Padres	2
Julio Teherán^{#}^{[P]}	Braves	1
Adam Wainwright	Cardinals	3
Tony Watson	Pirates	1
Jordan Zimmermann^{#}	Nationals	2

1. Salvador Perez was named starter in place of Matt Wieters due to injury.
2. Kurt Suzuki was named as the roster replacement for Wieters.
3. Jeff Samardzija was elected as a member of the Cubs, but was traded to the Athletics on July 4.
4. Kyle Seager was named as a replacement for Edwin Encarnación due to injury.
5. Koji Uehara was named as a replacement for Masahiro Tanaka due to injury.
6. Erick Aybar was named as a replacement for Alex Gordon due to injury.
7. Miguel Montero was named as a replacement for Yadier Molina due to injury.
8. Jonathan Lucroy was named starter in place of Yadier Molina due to injury.
9. Ian Kinsler was named as a replacement for Víctor Martínez due to injury.
10. Henderson Alvarez was named as a replacement for Jordan Zimmermann due to injury.
11. Fernando Rodney was named as a replacement for David Price due to Price starting on Sunday.
12. Alfredo Simon was named as a replacement for Johnny Cueto due to Cueto starting on Sunday.
13. Tim Hudson was named as a replacement for Madison Bumgarner due to Bumgarner starting on Sunday.
14. Tyler Clippard was named as a replacement for Julio Teheran due to Teheran starting on Sunday.
15. Huston Street was named as a replacement for Tyson Ross due to Ross starting on Sunday.
16. Julio Teheran was named as a replacement for Jeff Samardzija due to him being traded to the Oakland Athletics.

#: Indicates player would not play (replaced as per reference notes above).

== Game summary ==
=== Starting lineup ===
National				American			
Order	Player	Team	Position	Order	Player	Team	Position
1	Andrew McCutchen	Pirates	CF	1	Derek Jeter	Yankees	SS
2	Yasiel Puig	Dodgers	RF	2	Mike Trout	Angels	LF
3	Troy Tulowitzki	Rockies	SS	3	Robinson Canó	Mariners	2B
4	Paul Goldschmidt	Diamondbacks	1B	4	Miguel Cabrera	Tigers	1B
5	Giancarlo Stanton	Marlins	DH	5	José Bautista	Blue Jays	RF
6	Aramis Ramírez	Brewers	3B	6	Nelson Cruz	Orioles	DH
7	Chase Utley	Phillies	2B	7	Adam Jones	Orioles	CF
8	Jonathan Lucroy	Brewers	C	8	Josh Donaldson	Athletics	3B
9	Carlos Gómez	Brewers	LF	9	Salvador Pérez	Royals	C
	Adam Wainwright	Cardinals	P		Félix Hernández	Mariners	P

The American League took a 3–0 lead in the first inning on a Derek Jeter double, a Mike Trout triple and a Miguel Cabrera home run. The NL scored two runs in the second with three consecutive hits by Aramis Ramírez, Chase Utley and Jonathan Lucroy against Jon Lester. Lucroy tied the game at three in the fourth with another RBI double. The American League took a 5–3 lead in the 5th on a Trout double and a Jose Altuve sacrifice fly. The lead held up and the AL won by the score of 5–3. The host team's battery -- Minnesota Twins closer Glen Perkins and catcher Kurt Suzuki—took the field for the top of the ninth and Perkins earned the save.

=== Box score ===
Tuesday, July 15, 2014 7:19 pm (CDT) Target Field in Minneapolis, Minnesota, 72 °F (22 °C), partly cloudy
Team	1	2	3	4	5	6	7	8	9	R	H	E
National League	0	2	0	1	0	0	0	0	0	3	8	1
American League	3	0	0	0	2	0	0	0	X	5	7	0
Starting pitchers: NL: Adam Wainwright; AL: Félix Hernández; WP: Max Scherzer (1–0) LP: Pat Neshek (0–1) Sv: Glen Perkins (1); Home runs: NL: none AL: Miguel Cabrera (1); Attendance: 41,048 Time: 3:13; Umpires: Home Plate - Gary Cederstrom (crew chief); First Base - Jeff Nelson; Second Base - Bob Davidson; Third Base - Scott Barry; Left Field - Todd Tichenor; Right Field - Vic Carapazza

== See also ==
- List of Major League Baseball All-Star Game winners
- All-Star Futures Game
- Home Run Derby
