= 2011 Major League Baseball season =

2011 MLB season
- League: Major League Baseball
- Sport: Baseball
- Duration: March 31 – October 28, 2011
- Games: 162
- Teams: 30
- TV partner(s): Fox; TBS; ESPN; MLB Network

Draft
- Top draft pick: Gerrit Cole
- Picked by: Pittsburgh Pirates

Regular season
- Season MVP: NL: Ryan Braun (MIL); AL: Justin Verlander (DET)

Postseason
- AL champions: Texas Rangers
- AL runners-up: Detroit Tigers
- NL champions: St. Louis Cardinals
- NL runners-up: Milwaukee Brewers

World Series
- Champions: St. Louis Cardinals
- Runners-up: Texas Rangers
- World Series MVP: David Freese (STL)

MLB seasons
- ← 2010 2012 →

Locations of AL teams for the 2010–2012 MLB seasons
West Central East
Locations of NL teams for the 2009–2011 MLB seasons
West Central East

The 2011 Major League Baseball season began on Thursday, March 31, and ended on Wednesday, September 28. This marked the first time a season began on a Thursday since 1976, and the first time a regular season ended on a Wednesday since 1990. The 82nd edition of the Major League Baseball All-Star Game was played at Chase Field in Phoenix, Arizona, on July 12 with the National League defeating the American League for the second straight year, by a score of 5–1. As had been the case since 2003, the league winning that game had home field advantage in the World Series. Accordingly, the World Series began on October 19, and ended on October 28, with the St. Louis Cardinals winning in seven games over the Texas Rangers.

The season is notable for its wild card chase on the last day of the regular season.

Only two teams were unable to complete the entire 162-game regular season schedule, as the make-up game between the Los Angeles Dodgers and the Washington Nationals at Nationals Park on September 8 was cancelled due to rain and not made up, owing to scheduling constraints and the game being inconsequential to the playoffs.

== Standings ==
=== American League ===
AL East
Team	W	L	Pct.	GB	Home	Road
^{(1)} New York Yankees	97	65	.599	—	52‍–‍29	45‍–‍36
^{(4)} Tampa Bay Rays	91	71	.562	6	47‍–‍34	44‍–‍37
Boston Red Sox	90	72	.556	7	45‍–‍36	45‍–‍36
Toronto Blue Jays	81	81	.500	16	42‍–‍39	39‍–‍42
Baltimore Orioles	69	93	.426	28	39‍–‍42	30‍–‍51

AL Central
Team	W	L	Pct.	GB	Home	Road
^{(3)} Detroit Tigers	95	67	.586	—	50‍–‍31	45‍–‍36
Cleveland Indians	80	82	.494	15	44‍–‍37	36‍–‍45
Chicago White Sox	79	83	.488	16	36‍–‍45	43‍–‍38
Kansas City Royals	71	91	.438	24	40‍–‍41	31‍–‍50
Minnesota Twins	63	99	.389	32	33‍–‍48	30‍–‍51

AL West
Team	W	L	Pct.	GB	Home	Road
^{(2)} Texas Rangers	96	66	.593	—	52‍–‍29	44‍–‍37
Los Angeles Angels	86	76	.531	10	45‍–‍36	41‍–‍40
Oakland Athletics	74	88	.457	22	43‍–‍38	31‍–‍50
Seattle Mariners	67	95	.414	29	39‍–‍45	28‍–‍50

=== National League ===
NL East
Team	W	L	Pct.	GB	Home	Road
^{(1)} Philadelphia Phillies	102	60	.630	—	52‍–‍29	50‍–‍31
Atlanta Braves	89	73	.549	13	47‍–‍34	42‍–‍39
Washington Nationals	80	81	.497	21½	44‍–‍36	36‍–‍45
New York Mets	77	85	.475	25	34‍–‍47	43‍–‍38
Florida Marlins	72	90	.444	30	31‍–‍47	41‍–‍43

NL Central
Team	W	L	Pct.	GB	Home	Road
^{(2)} Milwaukee Brewers	96	66	.593	—	57‍–‍24	39‍–‍42
^{(4)} St. Louis Cardinals	90	72	.556	6	45‍–‍36	45‍–‍36
Cincinnati Reds	79	83	.488	17	42‍–‍39	37‍–‍44
Pittsburgh Pirates	72	90	.444	24	36‍–‍45	36‍–‍45
Chicago Cubs	71	91	.438	25	39‍–‍42	32‍–‍49
Houston Astros	56	106	.346	40	31‍–‍50	25‍–‍56

NL West
Team	W	L	Pct.	GB	Home	Road
^{(3)} Arizona Diamondbacks	94	68	.580	—	51‍–‍30	43‍–‍38
San Francisco Giants	86	76	.531	8	46‍–‍35	40‍–‍41
Los Angeles Dodgers	82	79	.509	11½	42‍–‍39	40‍–‍40
Colorado Rockies	73	89	.451	21	38‍–‍43	35‍–‍46
San Diego Padres	71	91	.438	23	35‍–‍46	36‍–‍45

== Postseason ==
=== Bracket ===
Division Series (ALDS, NLDS)
1	NY Yankees	2
3	Detroit	3
American League
2	Texas	3
4	Tampa Bay	1
1	Philadelphia	2
4	St. Louis	3
National League
2	Milwaukee	3
3	Arizona	2

League Championship Series (ALCS, NLCS)
3	Detroit	2
2	Texas	4
4	St. Louis	4
2	Milwaukee	2

World Series
AL2	Texas	3
NL4	St. Louis	4

== Managerial changes ==
=== General managers ===
==== Off-season ====
Team	Former GM	New GM	Former job
New York Mets	Omar Minaya	Sandy Alderson	CEO of San Diego Padres until March 2009.

==== In-season ====
Date	Team	Former GM	New GM	Former job
August 19	Chicago Cubs	Jim Hendry	Randy Bush	Bush was the assistant GM and served as his interim replacement until the team hired Theo Epstein in October.

=== Field managers ===
==== Off-season ====
Four teams announced new managers for the 2011 season after the former manager retired from baseball.

Team	Former manager	New manager	Story
Atlanta Braves	Bobby Cox	Fredi González	Cox announced in 2009 that the 2010 season would be his last as manager of the Braves. In two terms, first from 1978 through 1981 and from mid-1990, replacing Russ Nixon as manager through 2010, Cox has led the team to fourteen division titles, five pennants and the 1995 World Championship. Cox retires as the manager with the fourth highest number of wins (2,504) along with the most ejections in baseball history (158).
Chicago Cubs	Lou Piniella	Mike Quade	After six decades in baseball as a player, coach, manager and television commentator, Piniella announced on June 19, 2010, his intentions to retire. He has managed the New York Yankees, the Cincinnati Reds (including their 1990 World Series championship), the Seattle Mariners (including a record 116 win season in 2001), the Tampa Bay Devil Rays and the Cubs. The official retirement came on August 22 as Piniella stepped down due to his mother's failing health, and Quade, the Cubs' third base coach, was named interim manager, and was named permanent manager October 19.
Los Angeles Dodgers	Joe Torre	Don Mattingly	Torre announced on September 17 that he would not be returning to the Dodgers for the 2011 season. With his contract expiring and club ownership being contested in divorce court, Torre chose not to negotiate an extension. At the same time, the Dodgers announced the promotion of Mattingly, the team's hitting coach, to manager. As a player, Mattingly was best known as an outstanding first baseman with the New York Yankees.
Toronto Blue Jays	Cito Gaston	John Farrell	After being lured out of retirement by team president Paul Beeston, Gaston announced on October 29, 2009, that he would step aside after the completion of the 2010 season and remain in a consulting position. In his first term as the Jays' skipper, he led the team to their greatest success, winning back-to-back Fall Classic in 1992 and 1993. His second term started as he replaced John Gibbons in the middle of the 2008 season. Farrell comes over after serving as the pitching coach for the AL East rival Boston Red Sox.

At the end of the 2010 season, three teams fired their managers and made replacements:

Team	Former manager	New manager	Story
Milwaukee Brewers	Ken Macha	Ron Roenicke	Los Angeles Angels serving 11 seasons as Mike Scioscia's third base coach.
New York Mets	Jerry Manuel	Terry Collins	Manuel, along with general manager Omar Minaya, were fired following the end of the 2010 season on October 4, 2010. Since making the 2006 National League Championship Series, the team has fallen short of expectations, which include back to back season ending collapses in 2007 and 2008, followed by back-to-back injury plagued seasons in 2009 and 2010. Collins, a feisty and intense manager, was named the team's new manager November 2010 and returned to being a field manager in the majors after 12 years. He previously managed the Houston Astros and the Anaheim Angels from 1994 to 1999.
Pittsburgh Pirates	John Russell	Clint Hurdle	Russell was fired after three losing seasons, compiling a total record of 186–299 in those three seasons. The Pirates have not had a winning season since 1992, which was also the last time they made the playoffs. They have also endured six different managers during that span. Hurdle last managed the Colorado Rockies in 2009 before being replaced.

The following managers who were interim managers for 2010 will lead their respective teams in 2011:

Team	Manager that started 2010 season	Replacement	Story
Arizona Diamondbacks	A. J. Hinch	Kirk Gibson	Gibson, who started the season as bench coach, filled in for the final 83 games. New GM Kevin Towers made the decision to keep Gibson as the manager for 2011. Hinch was "demoted" from his position as Director of Player Development in 2009 when he took over for Bob Melvin.
Kansas City Royals	Trey Hillman	Ned Yost	After coming to Kansas City to be a consultant, the Royals named Yost on May 13 to replace Hillman. Prior to that, Yost served as manager of the Milwaukee Brewers for much of the 2008 season, only to be sacked in mid-September when the team was struggling to make the postseason. Hillman had previous success in Japan, leading the Hokkaido Nippon Ham Fighters to the Japan World Series championship in 2006.
Baltimore Orioles	Dave Trembley; Juan Samuel (interim)	Buck Showalter	The no-nonsense Showalter, who had previously managed the New York Yankees, the Texas Rangers and the Arizona Diamondbacks on the brink of success before being replaced, served as a commentator for ESPN's Baseball Tonight before agreeing to return to the dugout with the Orioles on August 3, and turned the fortunes of the Maryland ball club. Trembley was in the manager's seat until June 4, when third-base coach Samuel replaced him on an interim basis before Showalter's arrival.
Florida Marlins	Fredi González	Edwin Rodríguez	On May 23, González, who had coached under Bobby Cox in Atlanta, was fired from his position. Rodríguez had spent the past 1 1/2 years managing the New Orleans Zephyrs, the Marlins' Triple-A affiliate. Cox made discouraging comments about the handling of the dismissal shortly afterward, and as a result, was not honored by Marlins owner Jeffrey Loria when the Braves visit to Miami in September as part of Cox's retirement tour.
Chicago Cubs	Lou Piniella	Mike Quade	(See Above)

One team has hired a new manager:

Team	Manager that started 2010 season	Interim Manager	Replacement	Story
Seattle Mariners	Don Wakamatsu	Daren Brown	Eric Wedge	Wakamatsu, the first MLB manager of Asian-American descent, was fired on August 9 and replaced by Brown, at the time in his fourth season managing the Mariners' AAA affiliate, the Tacoma Rainiers. The team was expected to contend for the American League West title with the addition of Chone Figgins and Cliff Lee, but stumbled out of the starting gate. Wedge, who last managed with the Cleveland Indians in 2009, was reportedly hired by the Mariners according to a report by SI.com on October 15, 2010, and made official three days later.

==== In-season changes ====
Date	Team	Former manager	Reason	Replacement	Previous Job and Story
June 9	Oakland Athletics	Bob Geren	Fired	Bob Melvin	Melvin had been the manager of the Arizona Diamondbacks. Geren was fired after June 8 game.
June 19	Florida Marlins	Edwin Rodríguez	Resigned	Jack McKeon	After a losing streak and slump in June, Rodriguez announced his resignation on June 19. McKeon at age 80 became the oldest manager since Connie Mack to manage in the majors; he had won the 2003 World Series with the Marlins. McKeon announced his second retirement allowing Ozzie Guillén to become Marlins' skipper.
June 26 (June 23)	Washington Nationals	Jim Riggleman	Resigned	Davey Johnson (John McLaren)	McLaren, who was previously the Nationals bench coach, was named interim manager, but he is not expected to fill the role for the remainder of the season. Davey Johnson was named the full-time manager three days after Riggleman resigned and two days after McLaren was named interim manager.
September 26	Chicago White Sox	Ozzie Guillén	Released	Don Cooper	Guillen was released from his contract after the White Sox game on September 26 against the Toronto Blue Jays. Guillen became the Marlins new manager with the retirement of Jack McKeon at the end of the season. Cooper, the current pitching coach for the White Sox, managed the final two games of the season.

== League leaders ==
=== American League ===
Batting leaders
Stat	Player	Total
AVG	Miguel Cabrera (DET)	.344
OPS	José Bautista (TOR)	1.056
HR	José Bautista (TOR)	43
RBI	Curtis Granderson (NYY)	119
R	Curtis Granderson (NYY)	136
H	Adrián González (BOS); Michael Young (TEX)	213
SB	Coco Crisp (OAK); Brett Gardner (NYY)	49

Pitching leaders
Stat	Player	Total
W	Justin Verlander (DET)	24
L	Jeremy Guthrie (BAL)	17
ERA	Justin Verlander (DET)	2.40
K	Justin Verlander (DET)	250
IP	Justin Verlander (DET)	251.0
SV	José Valverde (DET)	49
WHIP	Justin Verlander (DET)	0.920

=== National League ===
Batting leaders
Stat	Player	Total
AVG	José Reyes (NYM)	.337
OPS	Ryan Braun (MIL)	.994
HR	Matt Kemp (LAD)	39
RBI	Matt Kemp (LAD)	126
R	Matt Kemp (LAD)	115
H	Starlin Castro (CHC)	207
SB	Michael Bourn (HOU/ATL)	61

Pitching leaders
Stat	Player	Total
W	Ian Kennedy (AZ); Clayton Kershaw (LAD)	21
L	Derek Lowe (ATL)	17
ERA	Clayton Kershaw (LAD)	2.28
K	Clayton Kershaw (LAD)	248
IP	Chris Carpenter (STL)	237.1
SV	John Axford (MIL); Craig Kimbrel (ATL)	46
WHIP	Clayton Kershaw (LAD)	0.977

== Milestones ==
=== Batters ===
- David Ortiz (BOS):
  - Set the major league record for RBI by a designated hitter (1004) by driving in a run with a groundout in the fourth inning against the Texas Rangers on April 2. He broke the record that was previously held by Edgar Martínez.
  - Recorded his 1,000th career run scored in the sixth inning against the Cleveland Indians on May 25. He became the 311th player to reach this mark.
- Ian Kinsler (TEX):
  - Became the first player in Major League history to hit leadoff home runs in his team's first two games of the season.
  - Became the 12th player in Major League history to record two 30 (home runs)/30 (stolen bases) seasons. He reached this mark on September 27 with his 30th stolen base against the Los Angeles Angels of Anaheim.
- Nelson Cruz (TEX):
  - Became the third player in Major League history, joining Willie Mays and Mark McGwire, and the first American League player to hit a home run in his fourth straight game to begin the baseball season.
  - Became the first player in Major League history to hit an official walk-off grand slam in postseason history (against the Detroit Tigers in Game 2 of the 2011 American League Championship Series). With that, Cruz also became the first batter to hit a walk-off hit in postseason for the Texas Rangers.
  - Set two postseason records with six home runs and 13 RBIs in the American League Championship Series against the Detroit Tigers. Cruz won the American League Championship Series Most Valuable Player Award.
- Chipper Jones (ATL):
  - Passed Mickey Mantle for second all-time for RBI by a switch-hitter by driving in his 1,510th run with an RBI groundout in the first inning against the San Diego Padres on April 27. Eddie Murray is the all-time leader with 1,917 RBIs.
- Jimmy Rollins (PHI):
  - Recorded his 1,000th career run scored in the eighth inning against the Washington Nationals on April 12. He became the 310th player to reach this mark.
  - Recorded his 100th career triple in the ninth inning against the St. Louis Cardinals on September 19. He became the 161st player to reach this mark.
- Johnny Damon (TB):
  - Became the first player in Major League history to hit a walk-off home run with five different teams by hitting the game-winning home run against the Minnesota Twins on April 14. He also hit walk-off home run with the Kansas City Royals, New York Yankees, Detroit Tigers and Boston Red Sox.
- Michael Young (TEX):
  - Recorded his 2,000th career hit with a single in the seventh inning against the Cleveland Indians on August 7. He became the 265th player, and first Rangers player, to reach this mark.
  - Recorded his 1,000th career run in the third inning against the Oakland Athletics on September 20. He became the 313th player to reach this mark.
- Adam Dunn (CWS):
  - Tied the Major League record with his 16th game this season that he went hitless and struck out at least three times in the game on August 1 against the New York Yankees. He joins Mark Reynolds, who set the record in 2009. He set the Major League record with his 17th such game on August 10 against the Baltimore Orioles. He finished the season with 18 such games.
- Andre Ethier (LAD):
  - Set a Major League record by hitting in 23 consecutive games in April with a double in first inning against the Florida Marlins on April 26. He broke the record that was held by Joe Torre in 1971. Ethier extended his April hitting streak to 26 games on April 30.
  - Tied the franchise record for consecutive seasons with 30-plus doubles with his double on September 6 against the Washington Nationals. Ethier tied Jackie Robinson with five consecutive seasons.
- Ben Zobrist (TB):
  - Became the fourth player in Major League history to record at least seven hits and 10 RBIs in a single day since RBIs became an official stat in 1920. The other three are Jim Bottomley (1929), Pete Fox (1935) and Nate Colbert (1972).
- Carlos Lee (HOU):
  - Recorded his 2,000th career hit in the first inning with a single against the New York Mets on May 14. He became the 261st player to reach this mark.
- Brian McCann (ATL):
  - Became the second player in Major League history to hit a pinch-hit, game-tying home run in the ninth inning and end the game in extra innings with another home run on May 17 against the Houston Astros. Jeff Heath, of the Boston Braves accomplished this feat on August 27, 1949, against the Cincinnati Reds.
- Wilson Ramos (WSH):
  - Became the fifth catcher (joining Jarrod Saltalamacchia, Jody Davis, Wes Westrum and Walker Cooper) since 1920 to score five runs in a single game and just the second catcher (the other is Westrum in 1950) to score five runs, hit a home run and a triple in the same game on May 20 against the Baltimore Orioles.
- Asdrúbal Cabrera (CLE):
  - Became the fifth shortstop (joining Barry Larkin, John Valentin, Cal Ripken Jr. and Roy McMillan) since 1920 to have five hits and two home runs in a game on May 22 against the Cincinnati Reds.
- Wilson Valdez (PHI):
  - Became the first position player to earn a win since Colorado Rockies catcher Brent Mayne on August 22, 2000, by recording the victory against the Cincinnati Reds on May 25.
- Brandon Crawford (SF):
  - Became the sixth player in Major League history to hit a grand slam in his first Major League game on May 27 against the Milwaukee Brewers.
- José Reyes (NYM):
  - After 1,000 career major-league games, Reyes has 98 triples and 360 stolen bases. The only other player in history with that many triples and stolen bases in their first 1000 games is Ty Cobb, who had 106 triples and 391 steals.
  - Became the first player in the Mets' 50-year history to win the batting title by hitting .337.
- José Bautista (TOR):
  - With 11 home runs during the month of May, the most in the American League, it was the fifth straight month in which he led the American League in home runs (excluding March and October) joining Jimmie Foxx in 1933–1934.
- Danny Espinosa (WSH):
  - Became the first rookie second-baseman in Major League history to hit 10 home runs before June 1.
- Curtis Granderson (NYY):
  - Became the second player in Major League history to have 17 or more home runs and five or more triples in a season before June 1. He joins Babe Ruth, who did it for the Yankees in 1928.
  - Became the third player in American League history (tenth in Major League history) to record at least 30 home runs, 20 steals and 10 triples in the same season with his triple on August 18 against the Minnesota Twins. The other American Leaguers were Ken Williams (1922) and Nomar Garciaparra (1997).
  - Became the second player in Major League history to have hit 40 home runs, 10 triples and have 20 stolen bases in a season on September 17 against the Toronto Blue Jays. Willie Mays accomplished this feat in 1955.
- Paul Konerko (CWS):
  - Recorded his 1,000th career run scored in the second inning against the Seattle Mariners on June 7. He became the 312th player to reach this mark.
  - Recorded his 2,000th career hit in the eighth inning against the Los Angeles Angels of Anaheim on August 23. He became the 266th player to reach this mark.
- Orlando Cabrera (SF)/(CLE):
  - Recorded his 2,000th career hit with a single in the second inning against the New York Yankees on June 12. He became the 262nd player to reach this mark.
- Vladimir Guerrero (BAL):
  - With his single in the sixth inning against the Boston Red Sox on September 26, Guerrero became the all-time hits leader (2,587 hits) among Dominican-born players, passing Julio Franco.
- Mark Teixeira (NYY):
  - Set the Major League record for most switch-hitting home runs in the same game by hitting home runs from both sides of the plate for the 12th game of his career against the Chicago White Sox on August 2. He broke the record that he shared with Eddie Murray and Chili Davis.
- Scott Rolen (CIN):
  - Recorded his 2,000th career hit with a single in the first inning against the St. Louis Cardinals on July 4. He became the 263rd player to reach this mark.
- Derek Jeter (NYY):
  - Recorded his 3,000th career hit with a home run in the third inning against the Tampa Bay Rays on July 9. He became the 28th player to reach this mark.
- Mike Cameron (FLA):
  - Became the first player in Major League history with a multiple-home run game for eight different teams by hitting two home runs against the Washington Nationals on July 27. He broke the record that he shared with Jeromy Burnitz and Reggie Sanders.
- Albert Pujols (STL):
  - Recorded his 2,000th career hit with a double in the eighth inning against the Chicago Cubs on July 29. He became the 264th player to reach this mark.
  - Reached 30 home runs for the 11th straight season with his home run on August 16 against the Pittsburgh Pirates. Barry Bonds (13), Alex Rodriguez (13) and Jimmie Foxx (12) are the only other players to have streaks of more than ten seasons with at least 30 home runs.
- Jason Kipnis (CLE):
  - Became the first player in Major League history to homer in four consecutive games within two weeks of his debut with his home run against the Boston Red Sox on August 3.
- J. D. Martinez (HOU):
  - Became the fifth player in Major League history to have as many as four home runs and 12 RBIs through his first ten games in the majors. He joins Dino Restelli (1949 Pirates), Alvin Davis (1984 Mariners), Mark Quinn (1999 Royals) and Taylor Teagarden (2008 Rangers).
- Dan Uggla (ATL):
  - With a home run on August 12 against the Chicago Cubs, Uggla became the fourth player in Major League history to have at least a 32-game hitting streak and 25-or-more home runs in the same season. The others were Roger Hornsby (1922), Joe DiMaggio (1941), Tommy Holmes (1945) and Chase Utley (2006).
  - With his 15th home run during his hitting streak on August 13 against the Chicago Cubs, Uggla tied the Major League record for most home runs during a hitting streak of any length. Joe DiMaggio hit 15 home runs during his 56-game hitting streak in 1941, Willie McCovey hit 15 home runs during his 24-game hitting streak in 1963 and Alex Rodriguez hit 15 home runs during a 23-game hitting streak that spanned the 2006 and 2007 seasons.
  - With his 30th home run on August 22 against the Chicago Cubs, Uggla became the first second baseman in modern baseball history (since 1900) with five seasons of at least 30 home runs.
- Jim Thome (CLE/MIN):
  - Recorded his 600th career home run as a part of the Minnesota Twins in the seventh inning against the Detroit Tigers on August 15. He became the eighth player to reach this mark.
- Ryan Zimmerman (WSH):
  - Became the first player in Major League history to have hit eight walk-off home runs in his first seven seasons with his walk-off grand slam on August 19 against the Philadelphia Phillies.
- Ryan Howard (PHI):
  - Played the 1,000th game of his big-league career on August 24. His 279 home runs is the most in Major League history through 1000 games breaking the old record of 277 that was held by Ralph Kiner.
- Matt Kemp (LAD):
  - Became the 55th player in Major League history to record a 30 (home runs)/30 (stolen bases) season. He reached this mark on August 26 with his 30th home run against the Colorado Rockies.
  - Became the second player in Major League history to record a season in which he hit .320 or better with at least 35 home runs, 125 RBIs and 35 stolen bases. The other was Ken Williams who accomplished this feat in 1922 for the St. Louis Browns.
- Adrián Beltré (TEX):
  - Recorded his 2,000th career hit with a single in the sixth inning against the Boston Red Sox on September 4. He became the 267th player to reach this mark.
- Juan Pierre (CWS):
  - Recorded his 2,000th career hit with a single in the seventh inning against the Cleveland Indians on September 8. He became the 268th player to reach this mark.
- Ryan Braun (MIL):
  - Became the 56th player in Major League history to record a 30 (home runs)/30 (stolen bases) season. He reached this mark on September 16 with his 30th home run against the Cincinnati Reds.
- Drew Stubbs (CIN):
  - Became the second player in Major League history to have struck out at least 200 times in a season on September 20 against the Houston Astros. He joins Mark Reynolds who accomplished this feat in 2008, 2009 and 2010.
- Starlin Castro (CHC):
  - With his 200th hit coming against the St. Louis Cardinals on September 23, he is the fifth youngest player in the last 100 years at the time of his 200th hit of a season. Castro was 21 years and 183 days. The four players that were younger than Castro at the time of their 200th hit in the season was Al Kaline, 1955 Detroit Tigers (20 years, 279 days), Vada Pinson, 1959 Cincinnati Reds (21 years, 39 days), Alex Rodriguez, 1996 Seattle Mariners (21 years, 48 days) and Buddy Lewis, 1937 Washington Senators (21 years, 50 days).
  - At the age of 21 years, became the youngest player ever to lead the National League in hits with 207, breaking the record held by Charlie Hollocher (22 years, 83 days old on final day of season) in 1918.
- Jacoby Ellsbury (BOS):
  - Became the 57th player in Major League history to record a 30 (home runs)/30 (stolen bases) season. He reached this mark on September 25 with his 30th home run against the New York Yankees. Ellsbury also became the first player in Red Sox history to join the 30/30 club.
- Ryan Lavarnway (BOS):
  - Became the third player in Major League history to hit multiple home runs in the first game that he had started behind the plate on September 27 against the Baltimore Orioles. The others were J. P. Arencibia (August 7, 2010) and Bobby Pfeil (July 27, 1971). Lavarnway also became the first player in Major League history to hit his first two big-league homers in the same game for a team trying to earn a postseason berth, in either of the season's last two scheduled games (excluding tie-breaker games).
- Evan Longoria (TB):
  - Became the second player in Major League history to hit a walk-off home run in the team's final game of the regular season and clinch a postseason berth for his club. The other was Bobby Thomson's 1951 "shot heard 'round the world".
- Eugenio Vélez (LAD):
  - With his ground out as a pinch hitter in the eighth inning on September 28 against the Arizona Diamondbacks, he set a modern-day record for non-pitchers with his 46th straight hitless at-bat breaking the record that was held by Bill Bergen, Dave Campbell and Craig Counsell. He finished the season hitless in 37 at-bats, which broke the record of 35 that was set by Hal Finney in 1936.
- Alex Rodriguez (NYY):
  - Became the first hitter to strike out to end a game that eliminated them from competition in the postseason twice in a row (against the Texas Rangers in the 2010 American League Championship Series and the Detroit Tigers in the 2011 American League Division Series)

=== Pitchers ===
==== No-hitters ====
- Francisco Liriano (MIN):
  - Threw the fifth no-hitter in Minnesota Twins history and the seventh in franchise history (the other two came when the club was known as the Washington Senators) in a 1–0 win over the Chicago White Sox in Chicago on May 3. It was also Liriano's first complete game in 95 major league starts. Liriano also became just the fifth pitcher in the last 30 years to throw a no-hitter that included more walks (6) than strikeouts (2). In addition, he carried the second-highest ERA (minimum three starts) of 9.13 into the outing of any pitcher to go on to throw a no-hitter, according to the Elias Sports Bureau.
- Justin Verlander (DET):
  - Threw the seventh no-hitter in Tigers history by defeating the Toronto Blue Jays in Toronto on May 7. This was Verlander's second no-hitter, his first coming against the Milwaukee Brewers in 2007. Verlander allowed one walk but still faced the minimum of 27 batters. He became the second Tigers pitcher (Virgil Trucks) and the 30th pitcher in Major League history to throw multiple career no-hitters.
- Ervin Santana (LAA):
  - Threw the ninth no-hitter in Angels history by defeating the Cleveland Indians 3–1 in Cleveland on July 27. This was Santana's first career no-hitter. Santana walked only one batter while striking out 10, but he allowed one unearned run, a wild pitch in the 1st. His no-no improved him to 6–8 on the year.

==== Other accomplishments ====
- Jered Weaver (LAA):
  - Became the first pitcher in Major League history with six wins by April 25. He defeated the Oakland Athletics to set this record. He also became the sixth pitcher since 1900 with six wins by the end of April joining Vida Blue (1971), Dave Stewart (1988), Randy Johnson (2000, 2002) and Brandon Webb (2008).
- Vin Mazzaro (KC):
  - According to The Elias Sports Bureau, Mazzaro became the first pitcher to give up at least 14 runs in fewer than three innings (2.1) in baseball's modern era (since 1900) against the Cleveland Indians on May 16.
- Jo-Jo Reyes (BAL)/(TOR):
  - Tied the major league record by making his 28th consecutive start without recording a win on May 25 against the New York Yankees. He ties the record that is currently held by Matt Keough (1978–79) and Cliff Curtis (1910–11).
- Mariano Rivera (NYY):
  - Became the first pitcher in Major League history to have appeared in 1,000 games for one team by closing out the Yankees win on May 25 against the Toronto Blue Jays. Rivera became the 15th pitcher overall to reach this plateau.
  - Recorded his 20th save of the season by closing out a win against the Colorado Rockies on June 26. This is the 15th time that Rivera has reached 20 saves in one season, tying Trevor Hoffman for the most 20-plus save seasons in Major League history.
  - Recorded his 25th save of the season by closing out a win against the Oakland Athletics on July 24. This extends his record to 15 consecutive seasons with 25 or more saves.
  - Set a Major League record for consecutive 30-save seasons with nine by closing out the win against the Los Angeles Angels of Anaheim on August 11.
  - With his save on September 5 against the Baltimore Orioles, Rivera set the Major League record for the most saves by any pitcher against any team. His 69th save against the Orioles broke the record that Trevor Hoffman had against the Los Angeles Dodgers.
  - Recorded his 600th career save by closing out a win against the Seattle Mariners on September 13. He became the 2nd player to reach this mark.
  - With his save on September 19 against the Minnesota Twins, Rivera became the all-time saves leader in Major League history with his 602nd save, breaking Trevor Hoffman's record.
- Francisco Cordero (CIN):
  - Recorded his 300th career save by closing out a win against the Milwaukee Brewers on June 1. He became the 22nd player to reach this mark.
  - With his 321st save on September 6 against the Chicago Cubs, Cordero tied José Mesa for the most saves by any pitcher from the Dominican Republic.
- Craig Kimbrel (ATL):
  - Tied the Major League record for most saves by a rookie before the All-Star break since 1969 that was set by Jonathan Papelbon in 2006 by closing out the game against the Colorado Rockies on July 5. It was Kimbrel's 26th save. He set the rookie record on July 7 with his 27th save by closing out a win against the Colorado Rockies. He finished with 28 saves before the All-Star Game.
  - Tied the Major League record for most saves by a rookie by recording his 40th save on August 23 against the Chicago Cubs. He tied the record that was set by Neftalí Feliz that was set in 2010. He then broke the record with his 41st against the Washington Nationals on August 31. He finished with 46 saves.
- Zach Britton (BAL):
  - Became the first player in Major League history to allow eight-or-more runs while lasting less than an inning in each of two consecutive starts. He allowed eight runs in two-thirds of an inning on July 8 against the Boston Red Sox and then in his next start on July 30 against the New York Yankees allowed nine runs in one-third of an inning.
- Sergio Santos (CWS):
  - Set the Major League record for most consecutive scoreless road games to begin a season on August 11 against the Baltimore Orioles. He hasn't been charged with a run in 25 appearances in road games this year. He broke the record that was previously held by Mariano Rivera.
- Jason Isringhausen (NYM):
  - Recorded his 300th career save by closing out a win against the San Diego Padres on August 15. He became the fourth-oldest pitcher at his time of his 300th save, behind Doug Jones, Dennis Eckersley and Todd Jones. He became the 23rd player to reach this mark.
- Alfredo Aceves (BOS):
  - With his victory in relief against the Oakland Athletics on August 27, Aceves lifted his career record to 23–2. This set the Major League record for the most wins by a pitcher in his first 25 decisions, breaking the record held by Larry Corcoran who had 22 wins in his first 25 decisions in 1880.
- Cliff Lee (PHI):
  - Became the first pitcher in Major League history to have two months in one season with at least five wins, no losses and an ERA under 0.50. Lee went 5–0 with a 0.21 ERA in June and then went 5–0 with a 0.45 ERA in August.
- Yoshinori Tateyama (TEX):
  - Became the second player in Major League history to allow grand slams to consecutive batters faced. He gave up a grand slam to Carl Crawford on September 3 then in his next appearance on September 10, allowed a grand slam to the first batter he faced, Scott Sizemore. Greg McCarthy did this in 1998.
- Roy Halladay (PHI):
  - Became the sixth player in Major League history to finish at least seven games over .500 in seven consecutive seasons. The other pitchers to do that are in the Hall of Fame: Tim Keefe (seven years, 1883–89), John Clarkson (nine, 1884–92), Kid Nichols (nine, 1890–98), Christy Mathewson (12, 1903–14) and Lefty Grove (seven, 1927–33).
- Micah Owings (AZ):
  - Became the second pitcher in modern Major League history to earn a victory in which he recorded three-or-fewer outs while allowing five-or-more runs on September 27 against the Los Angeles Dodgers. Jack Knott was the other pitcher who accomplished this on May 22, 1934.

=== Miscellaneous ===
- Mike Scioscia (LAA):
  - Became the 56th manager in Major League history to have 1,000 or more victories as his Angels defeated the Cleveland Indians on May 8. Scioscia is also the 23rd manager to get 1000 or more victories with a single team. He began his career as a manager in 2000, and reached this mark in 1817 games.
- Houston Astros
  - During their 5–1 loss to the Tampa Bay Rays on June 24, the Astros become the first team to use three pitchers with the same last name in a single game. Starter Wandy Rodríguez is followed to the mound by Fernando Rodríguez in the seventh and eighth inning, with Aneury Rodríguez pitching a scoreless ninth inning.
- San Francisco Giants:
  - Became the first team in Major League history to sweep a homestand of six games or more without scoring more than four runs in any of the games. They defeated the Colorado Rockies 4–3, 3–2, and 3–0 and defeated the Arizona Diamondbacks 1–0, 4–3, and 3–2. The games took place May 6 through May 12.
  - Tied the Major League record for consecutive solo home runs by hitting their 19th consecutive on August 10 against the Pittsburgh Pirates. Pablo Sandoval home run matched the record set by the Philadelphia Phillies in 1914. The Giants finished with 21 straight solo home runs when Cody Ross hit a 2-run home run on August 14 against the Florida Marlins.
- Tampa Bay Rays:
  - Became the first team in Major League history to avoid having more than one error in its first 49 games, according to statistics provided by the Rays from the Elias Sports Bureau. The streak stopped after 52 games.
  - Set the American League record for consecutive starts by a pitcher under the age of 30 on July 27 against the Oakland Athletics. James Shields start gave the Rays their 705th consecutive start which broke the record set by the Washington Senators from 1913 to 1917. The last Rays pitcher that was at least 30 years old to start was Jae Seo on May 24, 2007, which happened to be his 30th birthday.
  - Won their 1,000th game against the Texas Rangers on September 7. The Rays have lost 1245 games.
  - Became the first American League team to start a season 0–6 and make the postseason.
- Arizona Diamondbacks:
  - Became the first team in Major League history to enter the month of May with at least a 6 1/2-game deficit in their league (pre 1969) or division (since 1969) and gain sole possession of first place during the month on May 29.
  - With their 90th win against the Pittsburgh Pirates on September 21, the Diamondbacks become the eighth team in Major League history to win 90 games in a season after losing at least 90 games in each of the previous two seasons.
  - With their division-clinching victory on September 23, the Diamondbacks tied the Major League record for most losses in the previous season (65–97) by a team that finished in first place. The other two teams were the 1991 Atlanta Braves and the 1999 Diamondbacks.
- Tony La Russa (STL):
  - Joins Connie Mack (7,755 games) as the only manager or coach in American professional sports history to reach 5,000 games managed on June 10 against the Milwaukee Brewers.
- Pittsburgh Pirates/Houston Astros:
  - The Pirates (six) and Astros (four) used ten pitchers in the Pirates 1–0 victory on June 14. That is the most pitchers used in a 9-inning 1–0 game played without expanded rosters in Major League history.
- New York Yankees:
  - All four starting infielders (Mark Teixeira, Robinson Canó, Eduardo Núñez, Ramiro Peña) hit home runs on June 15 becoming the second time in team history that the Yankees had home runs from each of their starting infielders. The previous quartet to do so was Babe Dahlgren, Joe Gordon, Frankie Crosetti and Red Rolfe on August 22, 1939.
  - Became the third team in modern Major League history (since 1900) to issue no walks while sweeping a four-game series. They swept the Chicago White Sox from August 1–4. They join the Boston Red Sox who accomplished this feat against the White Sox in 1968 (August 5–8) and against Washington in 1905 (June 29 – July 3).
  - Became the first team in Major League history to hit three grand slams in a game on August 25 against the Oakland Athletics. Robinson Canó, Russell Martin and Curtis Granderson hit the grand slams in the 22–9 victory.
  - Set the Major League record (since 1900) for best winning percentage in day games with a 44–12 (.786) record. This broke the record of .748 that was held by the 1906 Chicago Cubs.
- Kansas City Royals:
  - On September 15, Melky Cabrera hit his 40th double as an outfielder (he had one as a designated hitter) to become the first team in Major League history to have three outfielders with 40 or more doubles in a season. Joining him is Alex Gordon and Jeff Francoeur.
  - On September 21, Billy Butler hit his 40th double this season to become the fourth Royals player to reach 40 doubles in a season. The Royals become the fourth team in Major League history to have four player reach that many doubles in a season, joining the Texas Rangers (2006), Philadelphia Phillies (1932) and the Detroit Tigers (1929).
- San Diego Padres/San Francisco Giants:
  - The Padres (17) and Giants (19) pitching staffs combined to strike out 36 batters in their 14-inning game on July 6. This is the most combined strikeouts in a game of 14 or fewer innings since 1900. The previous record was 35, that was set in August 2007, by the Oakland Athletics (21) and Texas Rangers (14) in 13-innings.
- Atlanta Braves:
  - Became the fifth franchise in Major League history to record 10,000 wins in league history by defeating the Washington Nationals on July 15.
  - Became the fourth franchise in Major League history to score 90,000 runs as Dan Uggla scored in the seventh inning against the Florida Marlins on July 29. They join the Chicago Cubs, San Francisco Giants and the St. Louis Cardinals.
  - Became the second franchise in Major League history to record 10,000 losses in league history by losing to the Florida Marlins on July 31. They join the Philadelphia Phillies as the only other franchise to reach this mark.
- Boston Red Sox/Tampa Bay Rays:
  - The Red Sox (five) and Rays (three) combined for only eight hits in Boston's 16-inning, 1–0 victory on July 17. This is the lowest hit total in any Major League game of 14 or more innings in the live-ball era (since 1920).
- Terry Francona:
  - Became the 57th manager in Major League history to have 1,000 or more victories as his Red Sox defeated the Seattle Mariners on July 23. Francona reached this mark in 1880 games.
- CC Sabathia/Carlos Zambrano:
  - Both pitchers allowed five home runs on August 12. This was the second time in Major League history that two pitchers allowed at least five home runs on the same day. The other was September 21, 1996, and Jeff D'Amico and Dave Telgheder were the pitchers.
- Milwaukee Brewers:
  - Became the first team in Major League history to earn a shutout win, hit at least three home runs, and execute a triple play in the same game on August 15 against the Los Angeles Dodgers.
- Philadelphia Phillies:
  - With their loss to the New York Mets on September 24, the Phillies extended their losing streak to eight games. This set a Major League record for most consecutive losses by a team that had at least 95 wins breaking the old record of seven that was held by the 1987 Toronto Blue Jays.
- Pittsburgh Pirates:
  - With their loss to the St. Louis Cardinals on September 14, the Pirates extended their record for most consecutive losing season to 19. Their last winning record was in 1992.
- Mike Carp/Eric Hosmer:
  - Both rookies went 5-for-5 on September 20. This marked the first time in modern Major League history (since 1900) that two rookies both went 5-for-5 or better on the same day.
- Toronto Blue Jays:
  - With their extra-inning victory on September 22 against the Los Angeles Angels of Anaheim, it was their 14th consecutive extra-inning win at the Rogers Centre, which tied the Major League record that was set by the Chicago Cubs from July 1928 to August 1930.
- Major League Baseball:
  - The 200,000th regular-season game in Major League Baseball history was recognized on September 24 at Minute Maid Park as the Colorado Rockies and Houston Astros game became official around 8:45pm EDT. The Rockies won the game in extra-innings.
- Boston Red Sox:
  - With their 20th loss (in 27 games) to the Baltimore Orioles on September 28, the Red Sox tied a Major League record for most losses from September 1 to the end of a season by a team that entered the month in first place. The 1914 New York Giants went 21–20 to finish the season.

== Awards and honors ==
=== Regular season ===
Baseball Writers' Association of America Awards
BBWAA Award	National League	American League
Rookie of the Year	Craig Kimbrel (ATL)	Jeremy Hellickson (TB)
Cy Young Award	Clayton Kershaw (LAD)	Justin Verlander (DET)
Manager of the Year	Kirk Gibson (AZ)	Joe Maddon (TB)
Most Valuable Player	Ryan Braun (MIL)	Justin Verlander (DET)
Gold Glove Awards
Position	National League	American League
Pitcher	Clayton Kershaw (LAD)	Mark Buehrle (CWS)
Catcher	Yadier Molina (STL)	Matt Wieters (BAL)
1st Base	Joey Votto (CIN)	Adrián González (BOS)
2nd Base	Brandon Phillips (CIN)	Dustin Pedroia (BOS)
3rd Base	Plácido Polanco (PHI)	Adrián Beltré (TEX)
Shortstop	Troy Tulowitzki (COL)	Erick Aybar (LAA)
Left field	Gerardo Parra (AZ)	Alex Gordon (KC)
Center field	Matt Kemp (LAD)	Jacoby Ellsbury (BOS)
Right field	Andre Ethier (LAD)	Nick Markakis (BAL)
Silver Slugger Awards
Pitcher/Designated Hitter	Daniel Hudson (AZ)	David Ortiz (BOS)
Catcher	Brian McCann (ATL)	Alex Avila (DET)
1st Base	Prince Fielder (MIL)	Adrián González (BOS)
2nd Base	Brandon Phillips (CIN)	Robinson Canó (NYY)
3rd Base	Aramis Ramírez (CHC)	Adrián Beltré (TEX)
Shortstop	Troy Tulowitzki (COL)	Asdrúbal Cabrera (CLE)
Outfield	Ryan Braun (MIL)	Curtis Granderson (NYY)
Outfield	Matt Kemp (LAD)	Jacoby Ellsbury (BOS)
Outfield	Justin Upton (AZ)	José Bautista (TOR)

==== Player of the Month ====
Month	American League	National League
April	José Bautista	Ryan Braun
May	José Bautista	Jay Bruce
June	Adrián González	Prince Fielder
July	Dustin Pedroia	Emilio Bonifacio
August	Curtis Granderson	Dan Uggla
September	Adrián Beltré	Ryan Braun

==== Pitcher of the Month ====
Month	American League	National League
April	Jered Weaver	Josh Johnson
May	Jeremy Hellickson	Jair Jurrjens
June	Justin Verlander	Cliff Lee
July	CC Sabathia	Clayton Kershaw
August	Ricky Romero	Cliff Lee
September	Doug Fister	Javier Vázquez

==== Rookie of the Month ====
Month	American League	National League
April	Michael Pineda	Darwin Barney
May	Jeremy Hellickson	Justin Turner
June	Ben Revere; Jemile Weeks	Craig Kimbrel
July	Eric Hosmer	Freddie Freeman
August	Mike Carp	Craig Kimbrel
September	Eric Hosmer	Dee Gordon

=== Other awards ===
- Comeback Players of the Year: Jacoby Ellsbury (BOS, American); Lance Berkman (STL, National)
- Edgar Martínez Award (Best designated hitter): David Ortiz (BOS)
- Hank Aaron Award: José Bautista (TOR, American); Matt Kemp (LAD, National)
- Roberto Clemente Award (Humanitarian): David Ortiz (BOS)
- Rolaids Relief Man Award: José Valverde (DET, American); John Axford (MIL, National)
- Delivery Man of the Year (Best Reliever): José Valverde (DET)
- Warren Spahn Award (Best left-handed pitcher): Clayton Kershaw (LAD)

Fielding Bible Awards
Position	Player
Pitcher	Mark Buehrle (CWS)
Catcher	Matt Wieters (BAL)
1st Base	Albert Pujols (STL)
2nd Base	Dustin Pedroia (BOS)
3rd Base	Adrián Beltré (TEX)
Shortstop	Troy Tulowitzki (COL)
Left Field	Brett Gardner (NYY)
Center Field	Austin Jackson (DET)
Right Field	Justin Upton (AZ)

== Home field attendance and payroll ==
Team name	Wins	%±	Home attendance	%±	Per game	Est. payroll	%±
Philadelphia Phillies	102	5.2%	3,680,718	−2.6%	45,441	$172,976,379	21.9%
New York Yankees	97	2.1%	3,653,680	−3.0%	45,107	$206,275,028	−2.1%
San Francisco Giants	86	−6.5%	3,387,303	11.5%	41,819	$124,198,333	25.9%
Minnesota Twins	63	−33.0%	3,168,116	−1.7%	39,113	$112,737,000	15.6%
Los Angeles Angels of Anaheim	86	7.5%	3,166,321	−2.6%	39,090	$138,543,166	32.0%
St. Louis Cardinals	90	4.7%	3,093,954	−6.3%	38,197	$105,433,572	12.7%
Milwaukee Brewers	96	24.7%	3,071,373	10.6%	37,918	$86,636,333	6.8%
Boston Red Sox	90	1.1%	3,054,001	0.2%	37,704	$166,662,475	1.3%
Chicago Cubs	71	−5.3%	3,017,966	−1.5%	37,259	$136,547,329	−6.9%
Texas Rangers	96	6.7%	2,946,949	17.6%	36,382	$93,799,264	66.1%
Los Angeles Dodgers	82	2.5%	2,935,139	−17.6%	36,236	$103,785,477	8.8%
Colorado Rockies	73	−12.0%	2,909,777	1.2%	35,923	$91,648,071	1.1%
Detroit Tigers	95	17.3%	2,642,045	7.3%	32,618	$106,875,231	−13.8%
Atlanta Braves	89	−2.2%	2,372,940	−5.5%	29,296	$93,855,132	11.2%
New York Mets	77	−2.5%	2,352,596	−8.1%	29,044	$151,897,309	13.0%
Cincinnati Reds	79	−13.2%	2,213,588	7.4%	27,328	$77,297,134	2.6%
San Diego Padres	71	−21.1%	2,143,018	0.5%	26,457	$45,869,140	21.3%
Arizona Diamondbacks	94	44.6%	2,105,432	2.4%	25,993	$54,823,166	−10.7%
Houston Astros	56	−26.3%	2,067,016	−11.3%	25,519	$71,110,500	−23.7%
Chicago White Sox	79	−10.2%	2,001,117	−8.8%	24,705	$127,789,000	19.2%
Washington Nationals	80	15.9%	1,940,478	6.1%	24,256	$68,492,928	1.2%
Pittsburgh Pirates	72	26.3%	1,940,429	20.3%	23,956	$45,047,000	20.3%
Seattle Mariners	67	9.8%	1,896,321	−9.1%	23,411	$86,110,600	−0.5%
Cleveland Indians	80	15.9%	1,840,835	32.3%	22,726	$49,426,566	−19.2%
Toronto Blue Jays	81	−4.7%	1,818,103	21.6%	22,446	$64,567,800	2.9%
Baltimore Orioles	69	4.5%	1,755,461	1.3%	21,672	$88,299,038	8.2%
Kansas City Royals	71	6.0%	1,724,450	6.8%	21,290	$35,712,000	−51.1%
Tampa Bay Rays	91	−5.2%	1,529,188	−18.0%	18,879	$41,053,571	−42.9%
Florida Marlins	72	−10.0%	1,520,562	−0.3%	18,772	$57,694,000	0.4%
Oakland Athletics	74	−8.6%	1,476,791	4.1%	18,232	$67,094,000	15.9%

== Broadcasting ==
=== Television ===
Two more teams joined the growing cable-exclusive telecast teams in 2011. Fox Sports Midwest produced and televised all St. Louis Cardinals games on the cable station, along with selected areas of the Cardinals' DMA outside St. Louis including Fox Sports Tennessee in Tennessee, Fox Sports Indiana in parts of Indiana, and SportsSouth in Arkansas and parts of Oklahoma. The 2010 season was their last season of splitting games with KSDK.

The Minnesota Twins also joined the group, with Fox Sports North becoming their exclusive local home. The 2010 season was their last season of splitting games with WFTC.

Atlanta Braves games that aired on WPCH-TV were produced by and simulcast on Fox Sports South or SportSouth, marking the first season since 1972 which local Braves telecasts weren't produced by Turner Sports.

The national telecast breakdown is as follows, along with the maximum number of appearances per team:

- Fox: Saturday afternoon Game of the Week on a regional basis; up to nine appearances per team. In addition, the network broadcast the All-Star Game, ALCS, and World Series. Fox Deportes held Spanish broadcast rights to the World Series. Most Saturday games started at 4 PM US EDT/1 pm PDT, except for games on April 9, April 30 and May 7, when those telecasts began at 1 PM US EDT/10 AM US PDT due to NASCAR coverage and on May 14, 21 and 28, the latter because of the UEFA Champions League final as those games were scheduled to start at 7 PM ET/4 PM PT.
- ESPN/ESPN2: Sunday Night Baseball on a weekly basis; five appearances per team. A new broadcast team with Dan Shulman and Orel Hersheiser joined Bobby Valentine, replacing Jon Miller and Joe Morgan. In addition, there were games on Monday and Wednesday nights (with the Monday games moving to either Wednesday nights to form a doubleheader or Friday nights when the 2011 NFL season began), Opening Day games on both March 31 and April 1, and the Home Run Derby on July 11. ESPN Deportes held Spanish rights to the Sunday night package.
- TBS: Sunday afternoon games starting on April 3; 13 appearances per team. TBS also carried the announcement of the All-Star teams in the National and American Leagues on July 3 as well as the Division Series and the NLCS as per an alternating contract with Fox. Blackout rules applied as HLN broadcast in the teams' markets during the regular season.
- MLB Network: The network again aired a Thursday Night Game of the Week, games on Tuesday, Friday and Saturday nights, and selected afternoon games. Thursday night games were mostly produced in-house, while all other games came from home teams' video productions. Blackouts applied, as viewers in competing teams' markets saw an alternative game from the feed of selected home teams. In addition, holiday games on Memorial Day (May 30), day games on July 4, Labor Day (September 5) and in addition, commencing in August, expanded coverage of the pennant races took place.

In Canada, Toronto Blue Jays games were televised on Rogers Sportsnet, which also held the Canadian rights to air the Fox and ESPN/ESPN2 games if they did not conflict with Blue Jays' games, and additional regular season games on a regional basis on Rogers Sportsnet One as well as the All-Star Game and the entire postseason. TSN2 held rights to the ESPN Sunday Night Baseball telecasts.

In Australia, it was free to air channel One HD and showed up to five games live per week, and European channel ESPN America broadcast games as well.

For international viewers, MLB International broadcast the All-Star Game, the NLCS and the World Series.

=== Radio ===
ESPN Radio served as MLB's national radio network, broadcasting Sunday Night Baseball as well as selected Saturday and holiday games during the regular season, the Home Run Derby and All-Star Game, and all postseason series. ESPN Deportes Radio held the Spanish language rights to the Fall Classic.

== Uniform changes ==
=== Wholesale changes ===
- The San Diego Padres changed the color of their road uniforms from the khaki/sand color to the standard gray road uniform.
- The Washington Nationals unveiled new uniforms on November 10. The road uniform remained unchanged except for the minor modifications in the letter W and a navy cap with red bill. The home and alternate uniforms featured the 'pretzeled W' logo exclusively on the left side, with the number on the right side. The gold accents were also removed. The blue alternates featured the 'pretzeled W' in the Stars and Stripes motif and were used on holiday games and accompanied with the official MLB commemorative cap.
- The Cleveland Indians unveiled a new road uniform featuring 'Cleveland' in block lettering and in navy with red trim. The accompanying cap featured a red block 'C' in navy blue, previously accompanying the cream retro home alternates, which were dressed with an alternate cap featuring a navy block 'C' in red.
- The Chicago White Sox added the Old English Sox logo on the left sleeve of the road uniforms, replacing the 'Pale Hose' logo.

=== Throwbacks ===
- The Braves and Phillies wore Negro league uniforms for the May 14 with the Braves donning the Atlanta Black Crackers replicas, and the Phillies wore Philadelphia Stars uniforms. In addition, for the Civil Rights Game the following day, both teams donned 1974 uniforms with a special 'Civil Rights Game' patch on the upper back of the jersey.
- The Padres were involved in four Turn Back the Clock games, their first was on June 11 at home against the Nationals as both donned 1936 uniforms (The Pacific Coast League version) and the Nats wore 1936 American League forerunners unis. On July 1, the Padres donned their brown, orange and yellow 1984 championship unis against the Seattle Mariners at Safeco Field, then honored their late manager Dick Williams wearing a patch with his initials ("RHW") on July 14 at home against the Giants, and again on July 22 in Philadelphia with the Ray Kroc initials.
- Fans of the Los Angeles Dodgers chose in an online survey the 1944 light blue uniforms worn in Brooklyn for night games, which were made of satin; however, they wore those for six weekday day games at Dodger Stadium and they were made from polyester. The opponents for all the weekday games wore throwbacks as well, starting with the Atlanta Braves on April 21, the Chicago Cubs on May 4, the Cincinnati Reds on June 15, and the Detroit Tigers on June 22. The Phillies and Padres opted to wear their regular uniforms for their August 10 and 31 games.
- On May 21, the Red Sox and Cubs wore 1918 uniforms to mark the Cubs' first visit to Fenway Park since the 1918 World Series.
- On June 21, during the interleague series between the Pittsburgh Pirates and the Baltimore Orioles, the teams donned replica uniforms that were used in the 1971 World Series. The Pirates were the first team to wear the standard double knit unis in 1970, when they moved from Forbes Field to Three Rivers Stadium that summer.
- The Minnesota Twins announced on May 16 a change to 1961 throwbacks at all their home games for the remainder of the season, as a tribute to Harmon Killebrew.
- On July 2, the Tampa Bay Rays wore 1950s throwback uniforms of the minor league team Tampa Smokers at home against the St. Louis Cardinals, who wore their 1950s throwbacks as well. The cigar located at the bottom of the Smokers wordmark was removed to avoid connotations with smoking.
- July 9 saw a tribute to the Negro leagues in Milwaukee, with the Brewers donning the 1921 Milwaukee Bears set, while the Cincinnati Reds wore 1930s Cincinnati Tigers uniforms. A week later, during the 9th Annual Negro League weekend at Detroit, the Chicago White Sox wore the jerseys of the Chicago American Giants and the Detroit Tigers honored the Detroit Stars during the 17th Annual Negro League Tribute Game. Another Negro League Tribute Game was held at PNC Park where the Pirates (Homestead Grays) faced the Cardinals (St. Louis Stars).
- On July 17, the A's and Angels wore 1980s throwbacks for "80's Day" at Oakland. As part of the promotion, fans got a MC Hammer bobblehead, who was once an executive under Charles O. Finley's ownership in the late 1970s.
- On September 9–11, the Diamondbacks wore their purple pinstripe uniforms that were used in Game 7 of the 2001 World Series. They wore the old uniforms in honor of the 10th anniversary reunion of the 2001 team that defeated the Yankees to win their only World Series.

=== Patches ===
- Besides the Diamondbacks wearing the All-Star Game logo on their uniforms, the following teams have added several memorial patches:
  - Both the Cincinnati Reds and the Detroit Tigers honored Sparky Anderson with a memorial on their sleeves. Cincinnati featured "SPARKY", while the Tigers wore both "Sparky" and his uniform No. 11 on a patch. In addition, the Tigers retired Anderson's No. 11.
  - The Indians honored Bob Feller with a patch featuring his retired No. 19 and an illustration of him in his famous windup.
  - The Dodgers saluted Duke Snider with a patch in a black circle with his retired No. 4 in white on their right sleeve.
  - The Mariners honored their long-time play-by-play announcer Dave Niehaus with a patch on their sleeve, featuring his famous call "My Oh My!"
  - The Chicago Cubs wore a patch with Ron Santo's retired No. 10 this season.
  - The Phillies honored the Buck Brothers, Alexander and John, who both died in the winter by wearing a black patch with a white Phillies script "B" on their left chest.
  - The Pittsburgh Pirates had patch with former manager Chuck Tanner's No. 7 on a Stargell Star for the season
  - Following the passing of Harmon Killebrew, the Twins added his retired number 3 to the right sleeve, and wore their pinstriped throwback alternate home uniforms for the rest of the season at Target Field.
  - Following the death of Paul Splittorff, the pitcher with most wins in the history of the Kansas City Royals, as well as one of their color commentators, the team started wearing a black circular patch as of May 26 with "SPLITT" in white lettering.
  - Both the Royals and Cardinals wore patches during their interleague series from June 17 to 19 that remembered the May 22, 2011 tornado that struck Joplin, Missouri, killing over 150 people. The patches featured an outline of the state of Missouri, both teams' logos and the words "TEAMS UNITE FOR JOPLIN".
  - The Texas Rangers and Oakland Athletics sported black ribbons on their uniforms on July 8, 2011, in memory of Rangers fan Shannon Stone, who died from a 20-foot fall after catching Josh Hamilton's toss into the left field stands off the foul ball during the second inning of Texas' 6–0 win over the A's at Rangers Ballpark in Arlington the night before. They sported the ribbons for the remainder of their series.
  - The Atlanta Braves wore "Ernie" patches on their sleeves starting with their August 21 game against the Arizona Diamondbacks to honor former pitcher and longtime broadcaster Ernie Johnson, Sr., who died on August 12 at the age of 87.
  - The Baltimore Orioles honored the late pitcher and broadcaster Mike Flanagan by sporting a black circular patch with his nickname "FLANNY" on their right sleeve. Orioles broadcasters also wore it on their jackets.
  - The Milwaukee Brewers honored long-time groundskeeper Gary Vanden Berg by sporting a navy blue patch with the initials "GV" in the front left of their uniforms. Vanden Berg died on October 12.
- The San Francisco Giants wore a patch on their right sleeve to commemorate their 2010 World Series championship.

=== Alternate jerseys ===
- The Seattle Mariners wore their teal alternative jerseys from the 1990s on Monday and Friday home games. Their navy jerseys were worn only on the road.
- The Oakland Athletics revealed their new yellow alternate home jersey on January 27, marking the first time the team has had a gold jersey since 1986. The A's also began to wear their yellow alternates on select road games, beginning on June 21 with the interleague series against the New York Mets, instead of their customary green alternates.
- The Minnesota Twins had a new alternate for the road based on the same concept as the navy jersey except it featured "Minnesota" across the chest in the same font as the gray jersey.
- The Padres also updated their camouflage jerseys to the current MARPAT digital pattern used by the Marine Corps and eliminated the green tones.

=== Special jerseys ===
- In honor of Hispanic Night, the Milwaukee Brewers and St. Louis Cardinals wore special uniforms on June 11 at Miller Park. The Cardinals wore their gray road uniforms, but with the word "Cardenales", while the Brewers wore special gold uniforms with the word "Cerveceros." On August 13, the Brewers and Pirates celebrated German Heritage Day donning jerseys with German names ("Bierbrauer" for Milwaukee and "Piraten" for Pittsburgh); Milwaukee pitcher Zack Greinke, in the game as a pinch hitter, accidentally wore a "Bierbrauer" jersey during the previous night's game as well. The team also again wore gold jerseys (with the "Brewers" name) on September 10 as part of a "gold out" against the Phillies.
- On August 5, the New York Mets wore special alternate jerseys against the Atlanta Braves for Fiesta Latina night at Citi Field honoring Latino culture. They were similar to their black alternate jerseys, but are blue with orange piping and feature "Los Mets" written in orange lettering and white trim. The Mets wore the blue "Los Mets" jerseys again on September 1 against the Florida Marlins for Hispanic Heritage Night.
- On August 20, the Houston Astros also wore Latin-inspired jerseys against the San Francisco Giants at Minute Maid Park. They used their non-pinstriped white home jerseys, with the addition of the word "Los" atop the word "Astros" in brick red with sand trim.
- On September 24, the Arizona Diamondbacks also wore Latin-inspired jerseys for Hispanic Heritage Day against the Giants at Chase Field. The jersey was similar to their black alternate uniforms, but with "Los D-Backs" substituting for the 'A' logo.

=== Other ===
- Majestic Athletic provided new button-down front spring training/batting practice jerseys with a modified design, and new jackets for all teams that started with the 2010 postseason.
- On April 15, all players on all teams – and all umpires – wore No. 42 on the commemoration of the 64th anniversary of Jackie Robinson's debut in the majors.
- Special caps were worn on Memorial Day and July 4 (For the Blue Jays, also on Canada Day as well). The caps were either red or blue with a white front and the team's logo in a Stars-and-Stripes motif (Toronto's caps have a Canadian flag). A portion of the proceeds made from sales of the caps will help Welcome Home Veterans. The New York Mets hosted Sunday night game on ESPN on September 11 to mark the tenth anniversary of the September 11 attacks; their city was targeted by the terrorists on September 11, 2001, and they hosted the first major professional sporting event held in New York City since the attacks, on September 11, 2001.
- Teams were scheduled to wear their special patriotic caps on September 11, but it was decided that they will wear their regular caps with a few alterations. All American-based teams sported a patch of the American flag behind their uniforms as well as on both sides of their baseball caps, in commemoration of the September 11 attacks. The Toronto Blue Jays sported a patch containing both the American and Canadian flags crossing each other on their uniforms, while their caps contained the American flag on the left and the Canadian flag on the right.
- Selected players who participated in the All-Star Game wore uniforms with two stars on each side of the MLB logo as well as the All-Star Game patch on the baseball cap to indicate their All-Star status. They wore them on the games played from July 4–10, the week before the All-Star Game.
- The Cleveland Indians and Minnesota Twins wore green caps in honor of Earth Day. The game, originally scheduled on April 22 but postponed due to rain, was held July 18 as part of a day-night doubleheader.

== Angels' 50th anniversary ==
The Los Angeles Angels of Anaheim celebrated their 50th Anniversary in 2011. Founded by Gene Autry in 1961, the team played at Los Angeles' Wrigley Field in their first season, then shared Dodger Stadium (called "Chavez Ravine" by Angels management) with the Dodgers before moving to Anaheim in 1966 and their own stadium, Anaheim Stadium (later to become Edison International Field of Anaheim and finally Angel Stadium of Anaheim). That year, the team name was altered to the California Angels. After being purchased by The Walt Disney Company in 1997, the team name was changed to the Anaheim Angels and after Arte Moreno purchased the team, the name was changed to its current moniker to the Los Angeles Angels of Anaheim in 2005. For the season, in addition to the patch, the Angels changed the color of the halo from silver to gold on their uniforms, just as it looked from 1971 through 1996. In addition, on selected Friday night games, the team donned replicas of five of the six styles of uniforms they have worn, the most notable omission being that of the "Periwinkle Blue" era from 1997 to 2001, when Disney owned the team.

== Stadiums ==
This was the Florida Marlins' final season at Sun Life Stadium, after 19 years, they moved to their new ballpark in downtown Miami, where they became the Miami Marlins.

=== Venue changes ===
Due to the U2 360° Tour concert scheduled June 29 at Sun Life Stadium and the needed time to set up the stage, the Marlins were forced to move their scheduled home games for June 24–26 against the Seattle Mariners to the Mariners' park at Safeco Field. As the Marlins were the home team, NL rules (no designated hitter) were applied. Mariners and Marlins did not meet again in Miami until 2014.

== Team purchases ==
The Houston Astros were sold by Drayton McLane for US $680 million to a group led by Jim Crane, the founder of a transit logistics company.

== Retired numbers ==
The Detroit Tigers retired Sparky Anderson's No. 11 on June 26.

Bert Blyleven, elected to the Class of 2011 of the Baseball Hall of Fame, was honored with the retirement of his uniform No. 28 by the Twins on July 16.

Roberto Alomar, also a 2011 Hall of Fame class member, became the first member of the Toronto Blue Jays to have his number (#12) retired on July 31.

The Atlanta Braves retired Bobby Cox's No. 6 prior to their game against the Chicago Cubs on August 12.

Trevor Hoffman, who had been the all-time saves leader until Mariano Rivera surpassed him on September 19, had his No. 51 retired by the San Diego Padres on August 21.

== See also ==
- List of Major League Baseball teams by payroll in 2011
- 2011 Korea Professional Baseball season
- 2011 Nippon Professional Baseball season
