= Rob Flippo =

American baseball coach (born 1966)

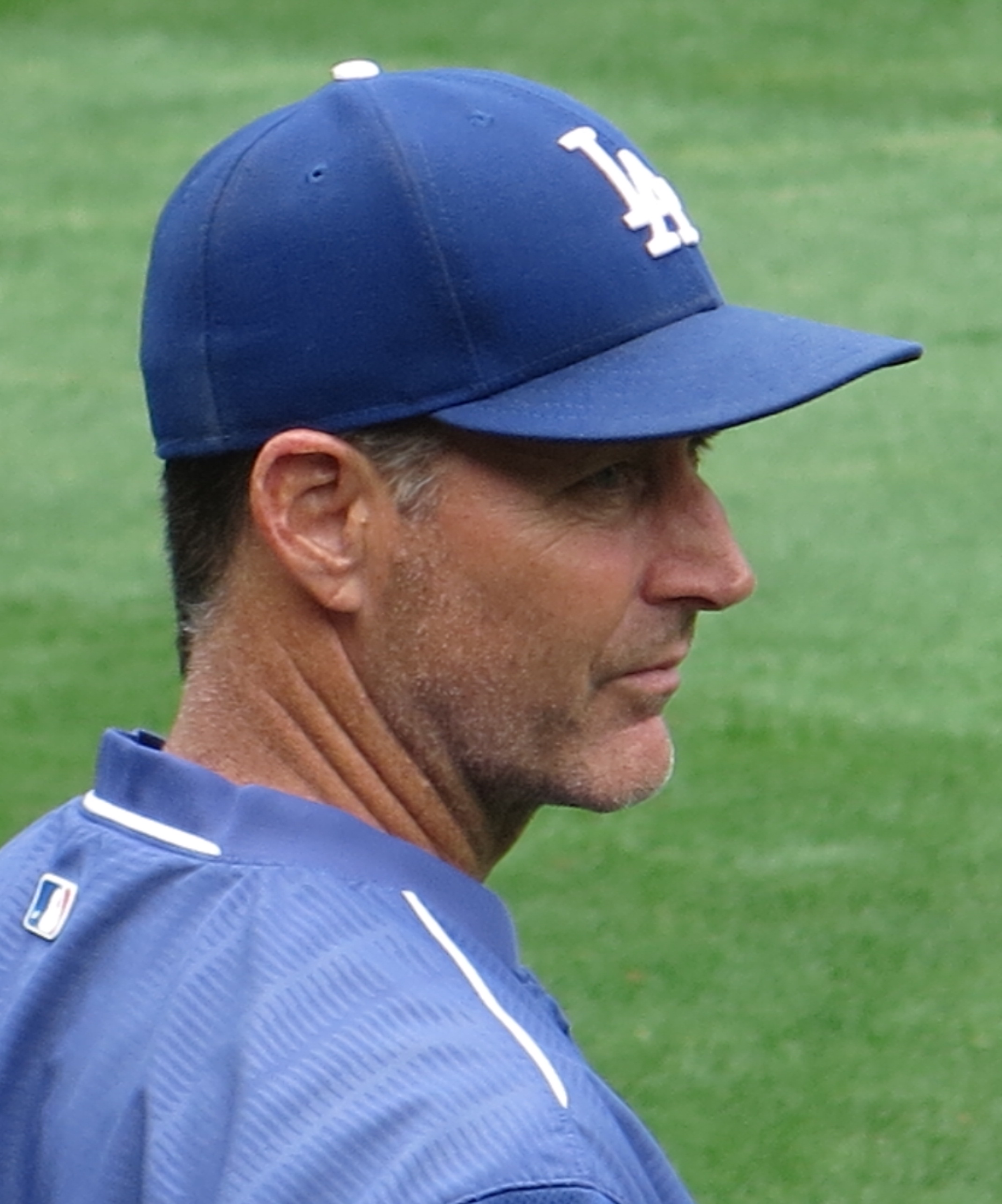
- Flippo with the Dodgers in 2017
- Coach
- Born: September 9, 1966 (age 59); Lodi, California
- Bats: Right Throws: Right
- Stats at Baseball Reference

Teams
- Los Angeles Dodgers (2002–2017); Miami Marlins (2018–2024)

Robert B. Flippo (born September 9, 1966) is an American professional baseball coach, who most recently served as the bullpen coordinator for the Miami Marlins of Major League Baseball (MLB).

== Career ==
He played college baseball at San Joaquin Delta College, where he was a two-year letterman and all-conference selection in 1986 and at the University of Pacific, where he was a two-year letterman, team captain, and a Conference Scholar Athlete. He played Minor League Baseball for the Bakersfield Dodgers in 1989 before beginning his coaching career.

He was an assistant coach at the University of North Carolina at Wilmington from 1998-2001, where he was the hitting coach as well as outfield and catchers coach. He also coached at Fresno State University and the University of South Alabama.

=== Los Angeles Dodgers ===
He joined the Los Angeles Dodgers organization as a coach for the Single-A Wilmington Waves in 2001 before becoming the Dodgers Bullpen Catcher in 2002. He also served as the batting practice pitcher for Hee Seop Choi in the 2005 Home Run Derby and Matt Kemp in the 2011 Home Run Derby and again on July 9, 2012. He was let go by the Dodgers after the 2017 season.

=== Miami Marlins ===
Flippo was hired by the Miami Marlins as their bullpen coordinator prior to the 2018 season. On October 2, 2024, Flippo was fired alongside the entirety of the Marlins coaching staff.
