= 2011 Major League Baseball Home Run Derby =

Baseball competition

- Date: July 11, 2011
- Venue: Chase Field
- City: Phoenix, Arizona
- Winner: Robinson Canó

The 2011 Major League Baseball Home Run Derby (known through sponsorship as the State Farm Home Run Derby) was a home run hitting contest in Major League Baseball (MLB) between four batters each from the National League and American League. The derby was held on July 11, 2011, at the site of the 2011 MLB All-Star Game, Chase Field in Phoenix, Arizona.

Robinson Canó won the derby, setting a record for home runs in the final round with 12.

== Rules ==
Each participant is thrown pitches by a pitcher of his choice. The hitter has the option of not swinging at a pitch. If he swings at a pitch and misses or hits the pitch anywhere but in home run territory, it is considered an out. Each player hits until he receives 10 outs in each round. When nine outs are reached in each round, a "gold money ball" comes into play.

In the first two rounds, home run totals will carry over for those rounds. Should there be a tie after either of the first two rounds, a "Swing-Off" takes place. In a Swing-Off, each tied player gets five swings to get as many home runs as possible. If after the 5 swings a tie still remains, players get one more swing to determine the winner. Home runs hit during a first round Swing-Off do not count towards the player's total going into the second round. All eight players participate in the first round; the four highest totals from round one will move to the semi-finals. The players with top two totals will face off in the finals, with the scores reset from the first two rounds.

== Results ==
Chase Field, Phoenix—A.L. 76, N.L. 19
| Player | League | Team | Pitcher | Round 1 | Round 2 | Subtotal | Finals | Total |
|---|---|---|---|---|---|---|---|---|
| Robinson Canó | American | New York Yankees | José Canó | 8 | 12 | 20 | 12^{a} | 32 |
| Adrián González | American | Boston Red Sox | Manny Acta | 9 | 11 | 20 | 11 | 31 |
| Prince Fielder | National | Milwaukee Brewers | Sandy Guerrero | 5 (5) | 4 | 9 | – | 9 |
| David Ortiz | American | Boston Red Sox | José Canó | 5 (4) | 4 | 9 | – | 9 |
| Matt Holliday | National | St. Louis Cardinals | Yadier Molina | 5 (2) | – | 5 | – | 5 |
| José Bautista | American | Toronto Blue Jays | Alex Andreopoulos | 4 | – | 4 | – | 4 |
| Rickie Weeks | National | Milwaukee Brewers | Sandy Guerrero | 3 | – | 3 | – | 3 |
| Matt Kemp | National | Los Angeles Dodgers | Rob Flippo | 2 | – | 2 | – | 2 |

italics – Hall of Famer

Notes:

Numbers in parentheses denote tiebreaker swingoff.

^aRecorded only six outs before hitting winning run.

== Charitable initiatives ==
State Farm donates US $3,000 for each non-Money Ball home run for the Boys and Girls Clubs of America, and US$18,000 (one dollar for each State Farm agent) for Gold Ball homers (which are home runs hit after 9 outs have been recorded) in the first round, increasing after each round. In addition, eight BGCA representatives for Arizona received a minimum of US$10,000, with the overall winner's representative receiving US$50,000 for their local clubs. The total amount raised was US$603,000.
