= Robinson Canó =

Dominican baseball player (born 1982)

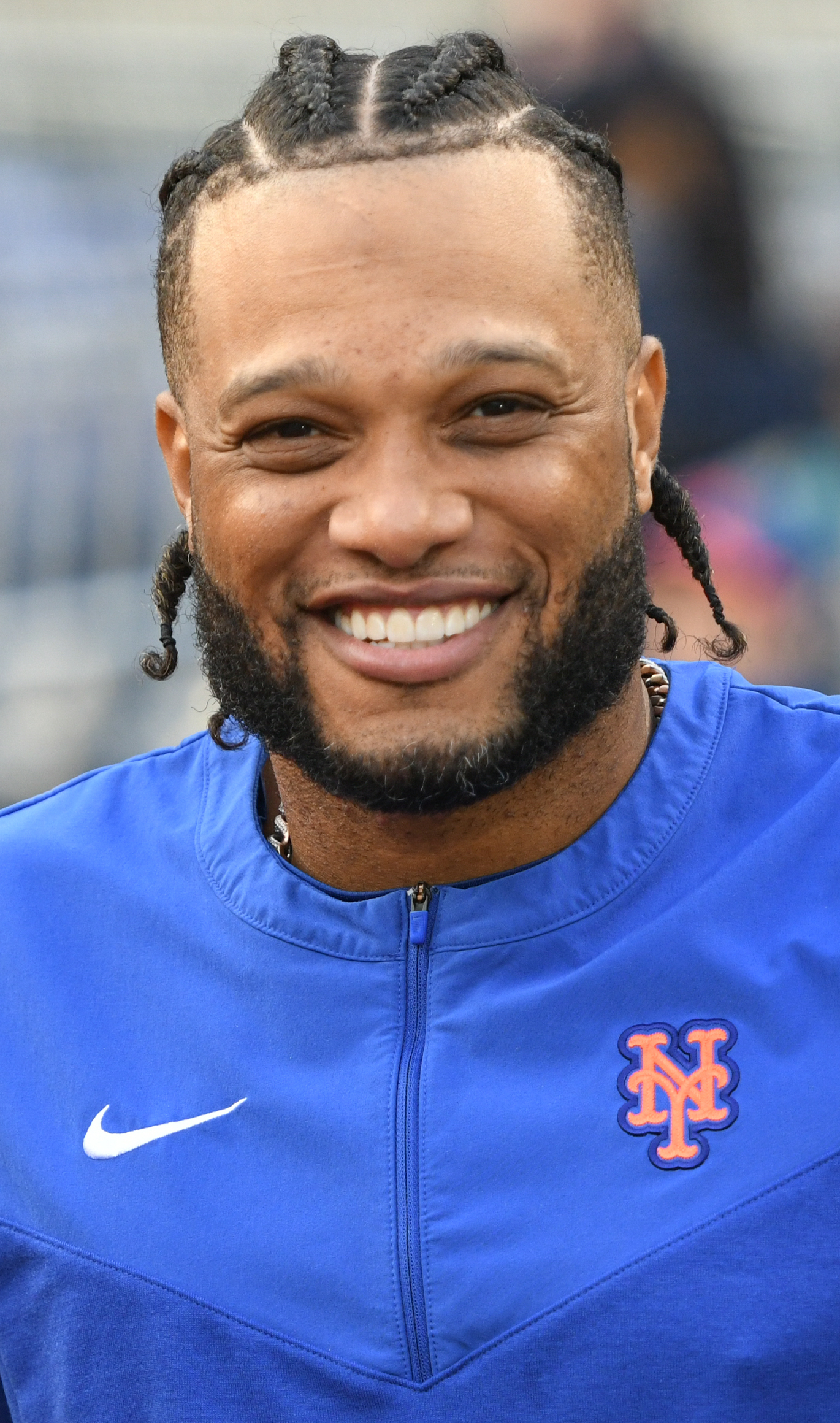
- Canó with the New York Mets in 2022

Diablos Rojos del México – No. 22
- Second baseman
- Born: October 22, 1982 (age 44); San Pedro de Macorís, Dominican Republic
- Bats: Left Throws: Right

MLB debut
- May 3, 2005, for the New York Yankees

MLB statistics (through 2022 season)
- Batting average: .301
- Hits: 2,639
- Home runs: 335
- Runs batted in: 1,306
- Stats at Baseball Reference

Teams
- New York Yankees (2005–2013); Seattle Mariners (2014–2018); New York Mets (2019–2020, 2022); San Diego Padres (2022); Atlanta Braves (2022)

Career highlights and awards
- MLB: 8× All-Star (2006, 2010–2014, 2016, 2017); World Series champion (2009); 2× Gold Glove Award (2010, 2012); 5× Silver Slugger Award (2006, 2010–2013); International: World Baseball Classic MVP (2013); All-World Baseball Classic Team (2013); BCL Americas champion (2025); BCL Americas MVP (2025)
Medals
Men's baseball
Representing Dominican Republic
World Baseball Classic
Gold medal – first place	2013 San Francisco	Team

Robinson José Canó Mercedes (Spanish pronunciation: [kaˈno]; born October 22, 1982) is a Dominican-American professional baseball second baseman for the Diablos Rojos del México of the Mexican League; he also captains the Estrellas Orientales of the Dominican Professional Baseball League. He previously played in Major League Baseball (MLB) for the New York Yankees, Seattle Mariners, New York Mets, San Diego Padres, and Atlanta Braves.

A native of San Pedro de Macorís, Dominican Republic, Canó signed with the Yankees organization as an amateur free agent in 2001. He played for the Yankees from 2005 to 2013 and was a member of the Yankees team that won the 2009 World Series over the Philadelphia Phillies. In December 2013, Canó signed a 10-year, $240 million contract with the Mariners. He played for them from 2014 to 2018, when he was traded to the Mets. Canó led all major league players in hits (1,695), doubles (363), and total bases (2,801) during the 2010s. He is an eight-time MLB All-Star, a five-time Silver Slugger Award winner, and a two-time Gold Glove Award winner. Canó was also the 2017 All-Star Game MVP and the 2011 Home Run Derby winner.

Canó has tested positive for performance-enhancing drugs twice. In 2018, Canó was suspended from MLB for 80 games for violating the league's joint drug agreement by using furosemide. Canó was also suspended for the entire 2021 season after testing positive for stanozolol.

Canó has represented the Dominican Republic in international play. In the 2013 World Baseball Classic (WBC) tournament, he won both a gold medal and a Most Valuable Player Award (MVP). Along with WBC teammates Octavio Dotel and Santiago Casilla, Canó became one of four players to have won both a World Series and a WBC.

== Early life ==
Cano's father, José Canó, signed with the New York Yankees as an amateur free agent in 1980 and pitched in the Yankees' and Atlanta Braves minor league systems before making his Major League debut and pitching six games for the Houston Astros in 1989. Robinson was named after baseball legend Jackie Robinson.

Canó was born on October 22, 1982, in San Pedro de Macorís, Dominican Republic, and grew up in the Dominican Republic, though he lived in New Jersey for three years. He spent seventh, eighth, and ninth grades in the Newark School System, attending Barringer High School for one year. When his family moved back to the Dominican Republic, Canó attended San Pedro Apostol High School in San Pedro de Macorís, where he played for the school's baseball and basketball teams. In the Dominican Winter Baseball League he plays for his hometown team, the Estrellas Orientales.

== Professional career ==
=== Minor leagues ===
After graduating from high school, Canó was signed by the Yankees on January 5, 2001, as an amateur free agent, receiving a signing bonus of over $100,000. He began playing in their minor league system that season, debuting with the Gulf Coast Yankees of the Rookie-level Gulf Coast League and the Staten Island Yankees of the Low–A New York–Penn League. Canó played for Staten Island and the Greensboro Bats of the Single–A South Atlantic League in 2002. Canó played for the Tampa Yankees of the High–A Florida State League and Trenton Thunder of the Double–A Eastern League in 2003, by which point he was viewed as a top prospect. Canó appeared in the 2003 All-Star Futures Game.

Canó was one of the five prospects offered to the Texas Rangers to complete the Yankees' acquisition of Alex Rodriguez before the 2004 season. The Rangers selected Joaquín Árias instead.

Canó began the 2004 season with Trenton, receiving a promotion to the Columbus Clippers of the Triple–A International League. When the Kansas City Royals began to seek trade offers for Carlos Beltrán, the Yankees moved Canó to third base in an effort to showcase Canó for the Royals. The next month, the Yankees attempted to trade him to the Arizona Diamondbacks as part of a package to acquire Randy Johnson. He began the 2005 season with Columbus.

=== New York Yankees (2005–2013) ===
==== 2005 ====
Canó was called up to the major leagues on May 3, 2005, while hitting .330 in 108 at bats with Columbus, and took over second base from Tony Womack. On May 5, Canó got his first career base hit off of Hideo Nomo of the Tampa Bay Devil Rays. Canó belted his first career grand slam that season as well. He finished second in American League Rookie of the Year balloting to Huston Street of the Oakland Athletics. Canó finished the year, however, with the third-worst walk percentage in the league, 3.0%. During 2005, manager Joe Torre compared Canó to Hall of Famer Rod Carew. Torre clarified that he meant that Canó "reminded" him of Carew, in terms of his build, presence at the plate, and smoothness in his swing.

==== 2006: First All-Star season ====
In 2006, Canó led the American League (AL) All-Star balloting at second base, but could not play after being placed on the disabled list for a strained hamstring. After his return from injury, however, on August 8, 2006, Canó led the league in batting average, doubles, and runs batted in. During late September 2006, Canó accumulated enough at-bats to once again qualify for the AL batting race. Canó was rewarded the AL Player of the Month award for September.

Canó finished 2006 with the third best batting average in the AL (.342, just two points behind teammate shortstop Derek Jeter and five points behind Minnesota Twins catcher Joe Mauer), and ninth in the league in doubles (41). He also led the AL in batting average on the road (.364; 96/264) and after the sixth inning (.353; 55/156). He had the third-worst walk percentage in the league at 3.6%. Canó received three votes for AL MVP.

==== 2007–2008 ====
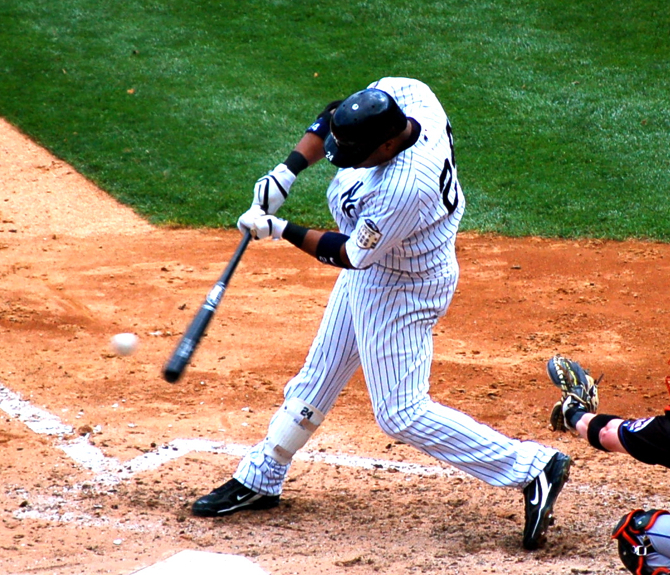
Canó batting for the Yankees in 2008.

In 2007, Canó gave up his number 22 to Roger Clemens, choosing to wear the number 24, a reversal of Jackie Robinson's number 42, in tribute to him. After a slow start to the 2007 season which saw him hit a meager .249 through May 29, Canó found his stroke batting .385 in the month of July with six home runs and 24 RBI to raise his season average to .300 by the end of the month. He finished 2007 sixth in the league in games played (160), ninth in triples (7), and tenth in hits (189), doubles (41), and at bats (617). He was the only batter in the top 10 in doubles in the AL in both 2006 and 2007.

On January 24, 2008, Canó signed a contract extension for $28 million over the next four years in the 2008 through 2011 seasons. The deal also included options for the Yankees for the 2012 and 2013 seasons, worth $27 million.

Canó struggled early in the 2008 season, hitting only .151 by the end of in April, with just 7 RBIs. He improved later in the year, hitting .300 from May through August.

Canó recorded the final walk-off hit in Yankee Stadium history by singling in the winning run in the bottom of the 9th inning in the Yankees 1–0 victory over the Orioles on September 20, 2008. In the final game at Yankee Stadium the next night (September 21, 2008), Canó recorded the final RBI in Stadium history with his sacrifice fly in the 7th inning, scoring Brett Gardner with the Stadium's final run. Canó missed only five games over the 2007 and 2008 seasons, and was one of only three Yankees to hit a home run as a pinch hitter.

==== 2009: World Series Championship ====
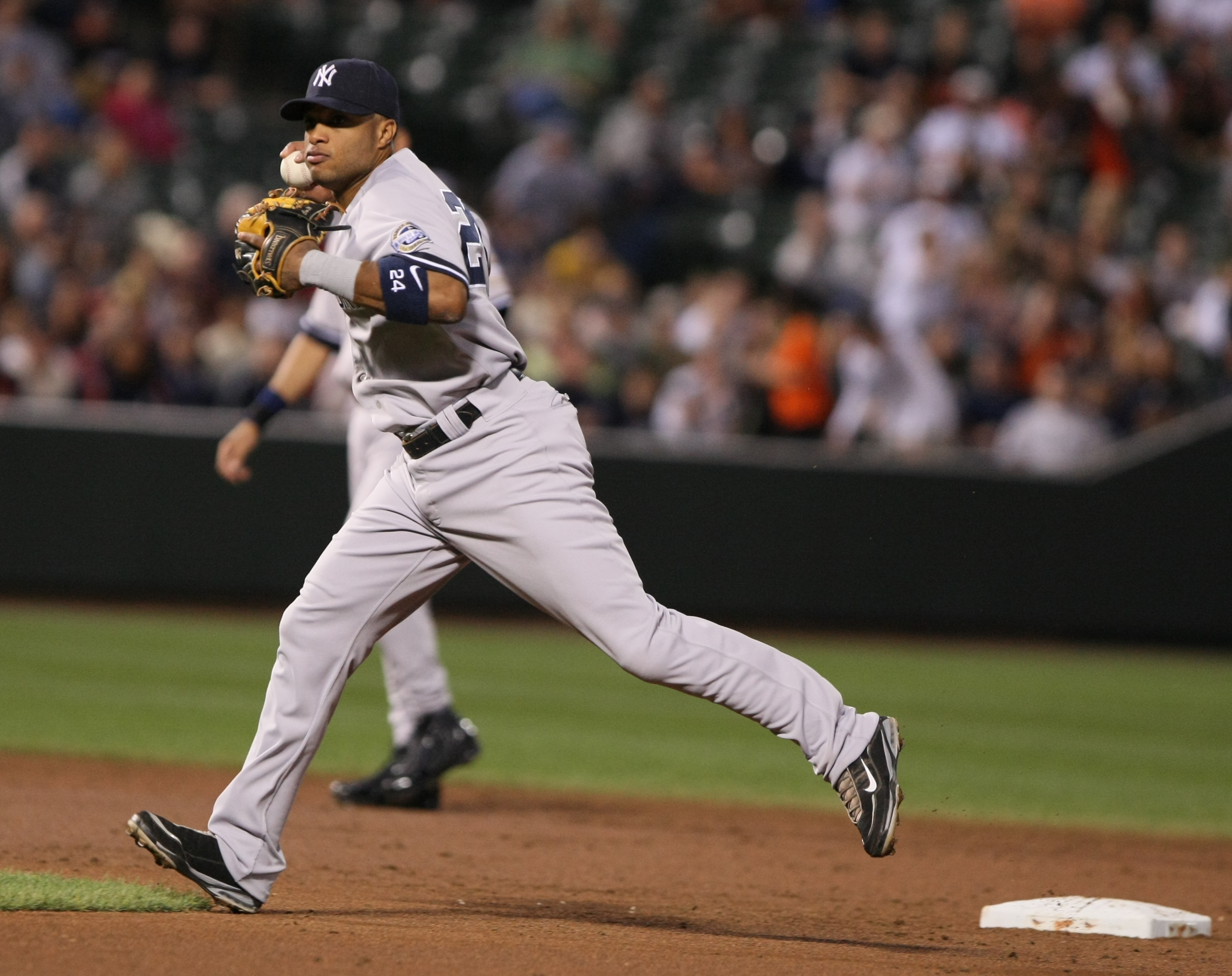
Canó in the field

In 2009, Canó hit .320 with 204 hits, 25 home runs and 85 RBI. Canó ranked in the top ten among players in the American league in hits, extra base hits, total bases, at bats, doubles, batting average, runs scored, and triples. It was his first year hitting over 20 home runs. His 200th hit against the Boston Red Sox to clinch the AL East Division made him and Derek Jeter the first middle infield duo in MLB history to both have 200 hits in the same season.

His 204 hits ranked third for hits during the 2009 season, and first among all second basemen. Canó also led second basemen in batting average. Canó also played in 161 games which was the most games played by a player during the 2009 season. He also hit his first career walk-off home run: a 3-run walk-off home run on August 28 against the White Sox. On November 4, Canó threw out Shane Victorino for the final out of the 2009 World Series.

==== 2010: Second All-Star and first Gold Glove season ====
With the departure of Hideki Matsui, Canó was moved into the fifth spot in the batting order. For his early season performance, Canó was named the AL Player of the Month for April 2010. He was elected as the starting second baseman in the 2010 MLB All-Star Game and was selected to participate in the 2010 Home Run Derby; however, he withdrew due to a minor injury. He finished the season with a milestone 200 hits and 100+ RBIs (109).

Canó performed ably in the middle of the lineup, replacing Matsui and Alex Rodriguez while Rodriguez was on the disabled list, as he had improved his batting with runners in scoring position.

Canó hit .343 with four home runs and 6 RBIs in the 2010 postseason. He finished the season with a .996 fielding percentage, the best for a second baseman in MLB, committing only three errors in 158 games. He turned 114 double plays and recorded 341 putouts. Canó won the American League Gold Glove Award for second basemen in 2010, the first by a Yankee second baseman since Bobby Richardson's five-year run from 1961 to 1965. Canó also won the American League Silver Slugger Award for second basemen with a batting average of .319, 29 home runs and 109 runs batted in. In addition, he finished third in the voting for AL MVP.

==== 2011: Third All-Star ====
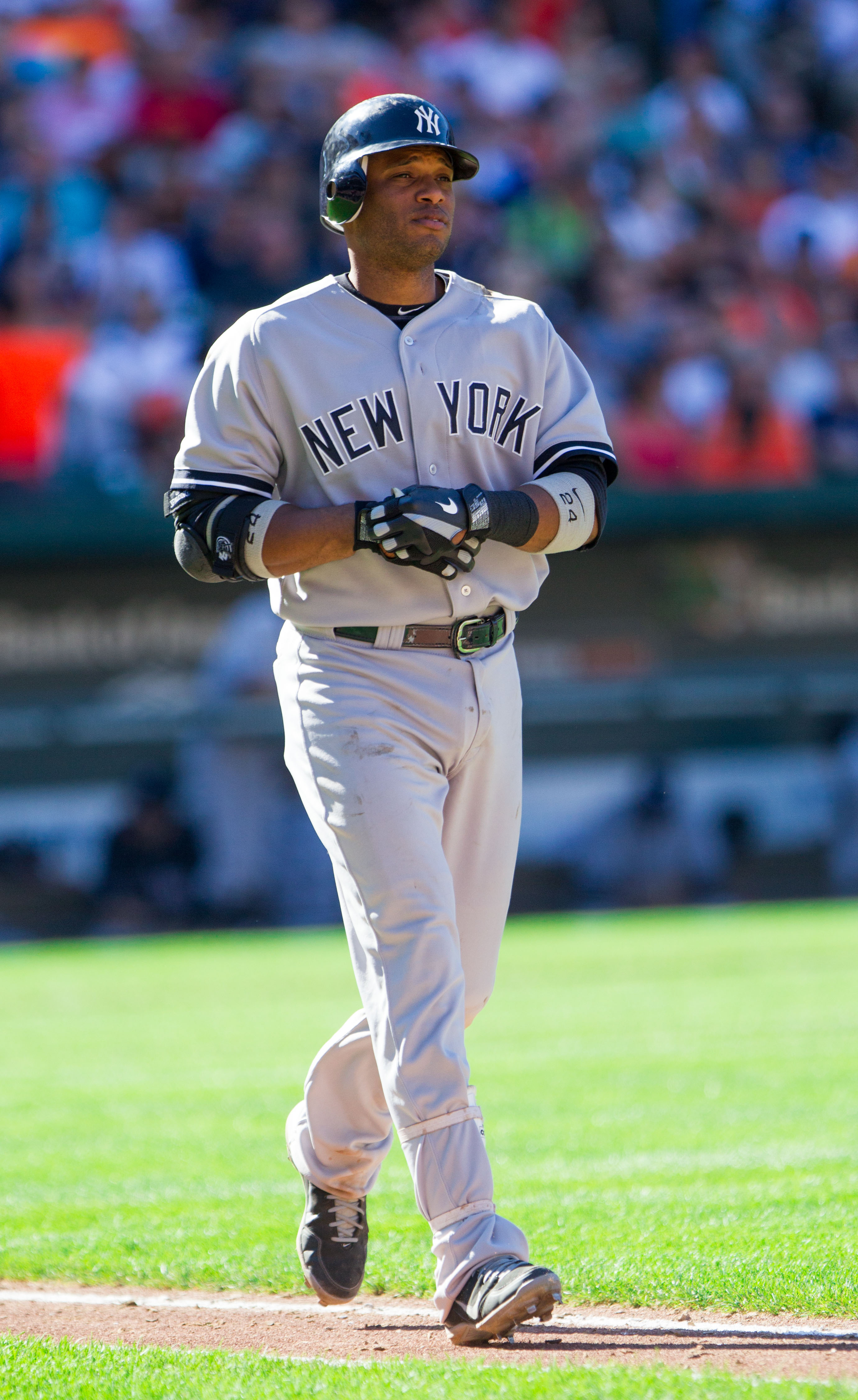
Canó with the Yankees in 2012

Canó had a rough first half to his defensive season. By June 18, he had committed six errors, twice as many as he had the previous season, when he won a Gold Glove.

Canó was selected for the 2011 MLB All-Star Game as a starting second baseman, and was chosen to participate in the 2011 Home Run Derby. With his father pitching, Canó won the derby, setting a record for home runs in the final round with 12 home runs despite having an additional four outs remaining.

Facing the Los Angeles Angels of Anaheim on August 10, Canó fell a single short of hitting for the cycle. It marked the second time in his career that he missed the cycle by a single (the first being in 2005). Canó finished the 2011 season with 188 hits, 28 home runs, and a career-high 118 RBIs in 159 games.

In Game 1 of the 2011 AL Division Series, Canó hit a grand slam in the bottom of the sixth inning to give the Yankees an 8–1 lead. It marked his fourth grand slam of the year, including the regular season. He sandwiched the home run between two run-scoring doubles, giving him 6 total RBI for the game. The Yankees would eventually lose the series in five games to the Detroit Tigers.

==== 2012: Fourth All-Star season ====
While Canó hit only one home run in April, he recovered to hit seven homers in May, and a career-high 11 home runs in June. He returned to compete in the 2012 Home Run Derby but was not able to repeat the previous year's victory. Instead, he hit zero home runs and finished in last place, and was booed by the Kansas City fans for not having chosen the Royals' Billy Butler to participate in the competition after previously stating that he would choose a Royal. He became the ninth player to fail to hit a home run in the Derby, and first since Brandon Inge in 2009.

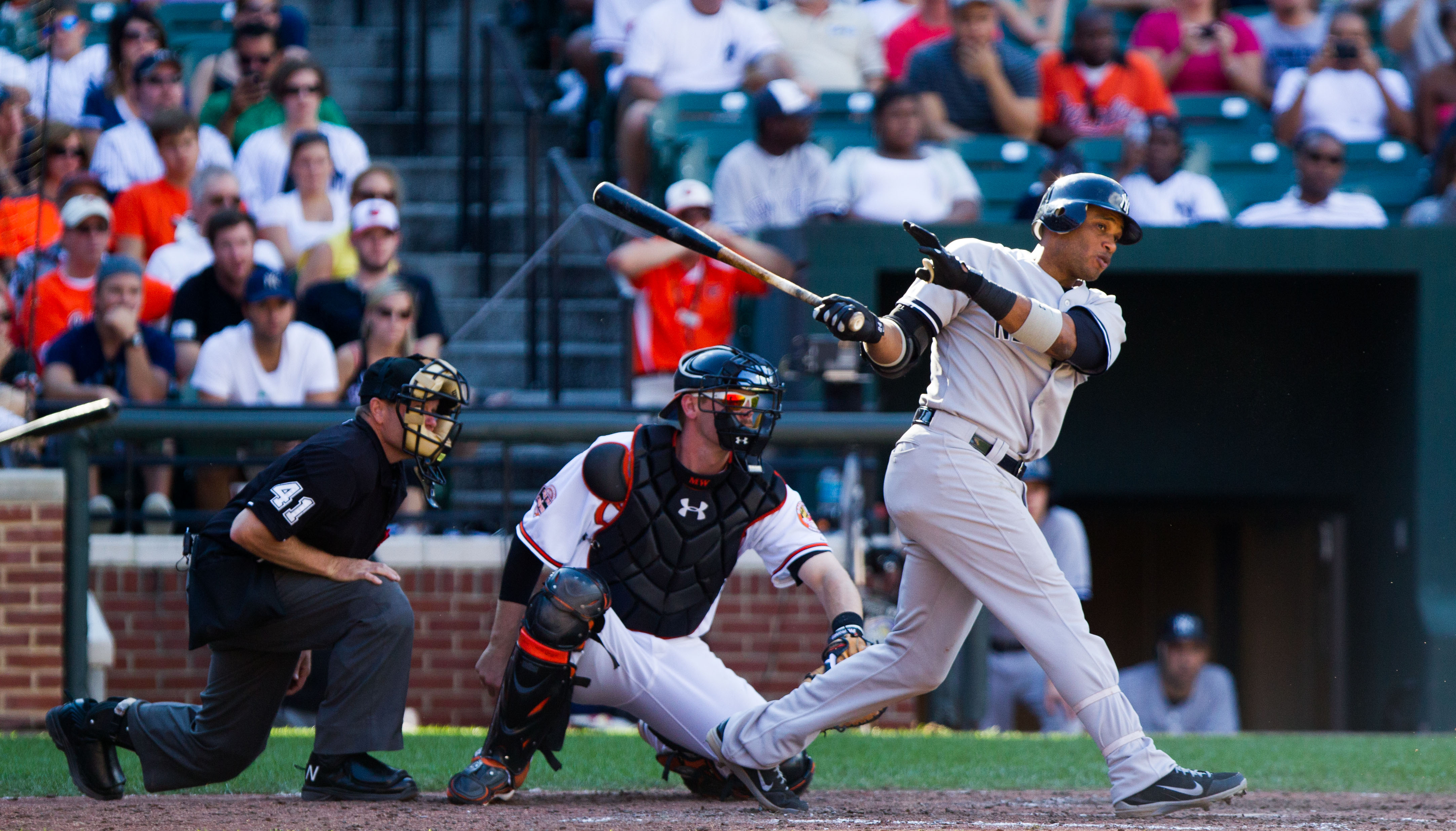
Canó batting in September 2012

On July 20, 2012, Canó extended his career-high hitting streak to 23 games with a single off of Oakland Athletics pitcher Tommy Milone in a 3–2 Yankees loss. And, in the last 10 games of the season, he went on a ferocious tear, going 24-for-39 for an .615 average with three home runs, seven doubles and 14 RBI. Canó finished the 2012 season with a .313 batting average, 48 doubles, 33 home runs, and 94 RBI.

Canó performed poorly during the postseason. Over his first eight games in the 2012 AL Division Series and AL Championship Series, he batted .083 (3-for-36), including a stretch from October 9–16 when he was hitless after 29 at-bats, the longest hitless streak for any single year of the postseason play in MLB history. In the Game 4 finale, when the Tigers' sweep of the Yankees was complete, again Canó went 0-for-4, and his 2012 postseason average dropped to .075 (3-for-40).

On October 29, the Yankees exercised Canó's club option for 2013 for $15 million, keeping him away from free agency for another year.

==== 2013: Fifth All-Star season ====
On April 13, 2013, Canó made his first career appearance at shortstop. He began the first half of the 2013 season with a .302 batting average, 21 home runs, and 65 RBI. He was named the AL captain for the 2013 Home Run Derby. During his only plate appearance of the 2013 All-Star Game, he was hit by a pitch thrown by Matt Harvey and suffered a right quad contusion. Cano left the game and was replaced by Dustin Pedroia. He only played for two pitches.

On August 20, Canó hit his 200th career home run, a three-run blast to center field off of Toronto Blue Jays pitcher Esmil Rogers at Yankee Stadium. During the 2013 season, Canó batted .314 with 190 hits, 27 home runs, and 107 RBI in 160 games played.

=== Seattle Mariners (2014–2018) ===
In December 2013, Canó signed a 10-year, $240 million contract with the Seattle Mariners. Canó was offered a seven-year, $175 million contract to return to the Yankees, but turned it down in search of a longer deal.

==== 2014: Sixth All-Star season ====
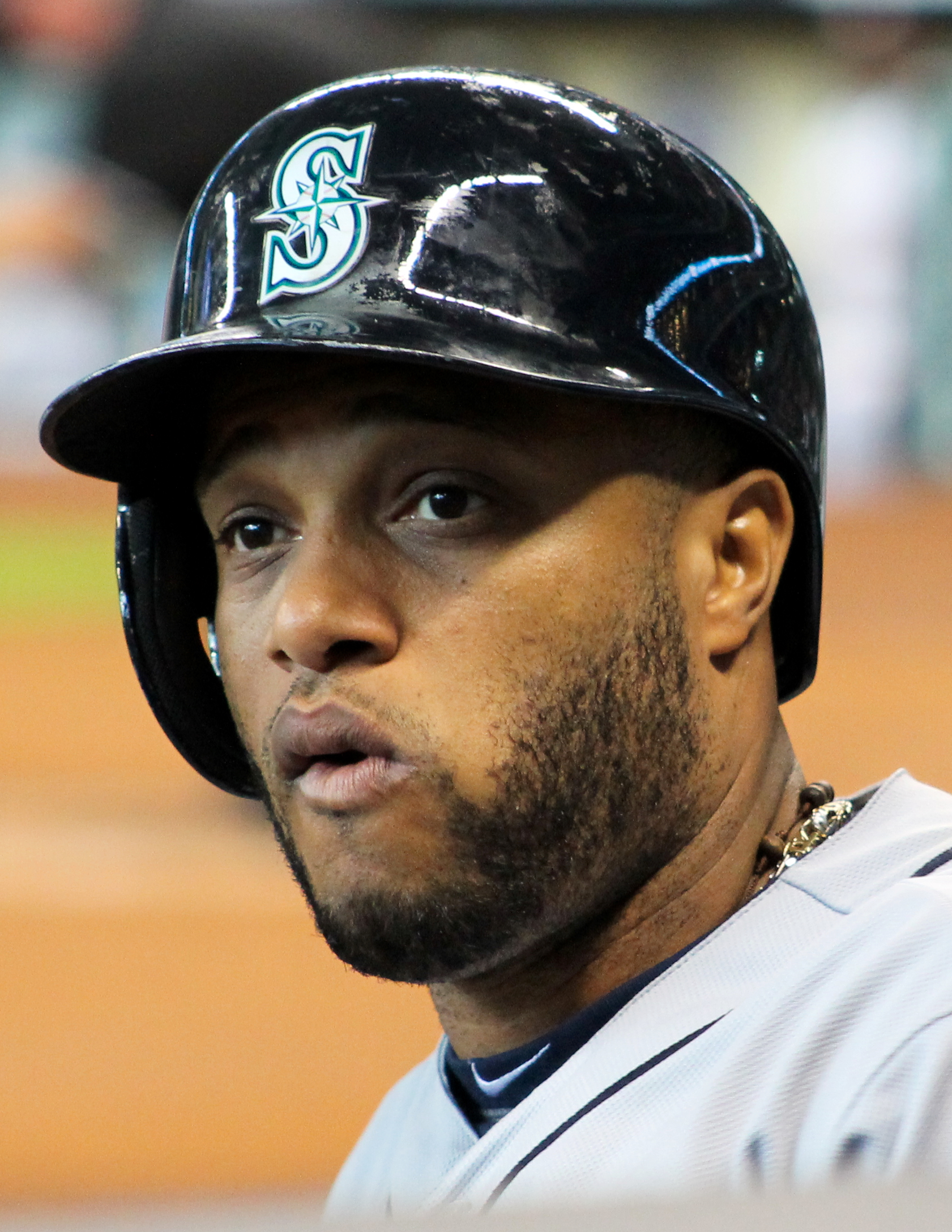
Canó with the Mariners in 2014

Canó made his debut for the Mariners on March 31, going 2-for-4 with a double. Canó recorded his first RBI for the Mariners on April 2. On July 6, Canó was named the AL starting second baseman for the 2014 MLB All-Star Game. This marked Canó's sixth career All Star selection, and his fifth consecutive. Canó finished the season with a .314 batting average with 14 home runs and 82 RBI. During August, he began to suffer from gastrointestinal symptoms that were later diagnosed as resulting from an intestinal parasite.

After the season, Canó traveled to Japan to join a team of MLB All-Stars playing against All-Stars of Nippon Professional Baseball in the 2014 Major League Baseball Japan All-Star Series. He fractured a toe during the series, requiring 3–4 weeks to heal.

==== 2015 ====
Canó suffered through acid reflux during the 2015 season, which resulted from the treatment of the parasite. He was not named to the 2015 All-Star Game roster, ending a streak of five consecutive years as an All-Star. He hit .287 with 21 home runs, 34 doubles, and 79 RBIs in 156 games during the 2015 season, but improved in the second half of the season, batting .330. He tied for 2nd in the AL in double plays grounded into, with 26. After the 2015 season, Cano had surgery to repair a sports hernia.

==== 2016: Seventh All-Star season ====
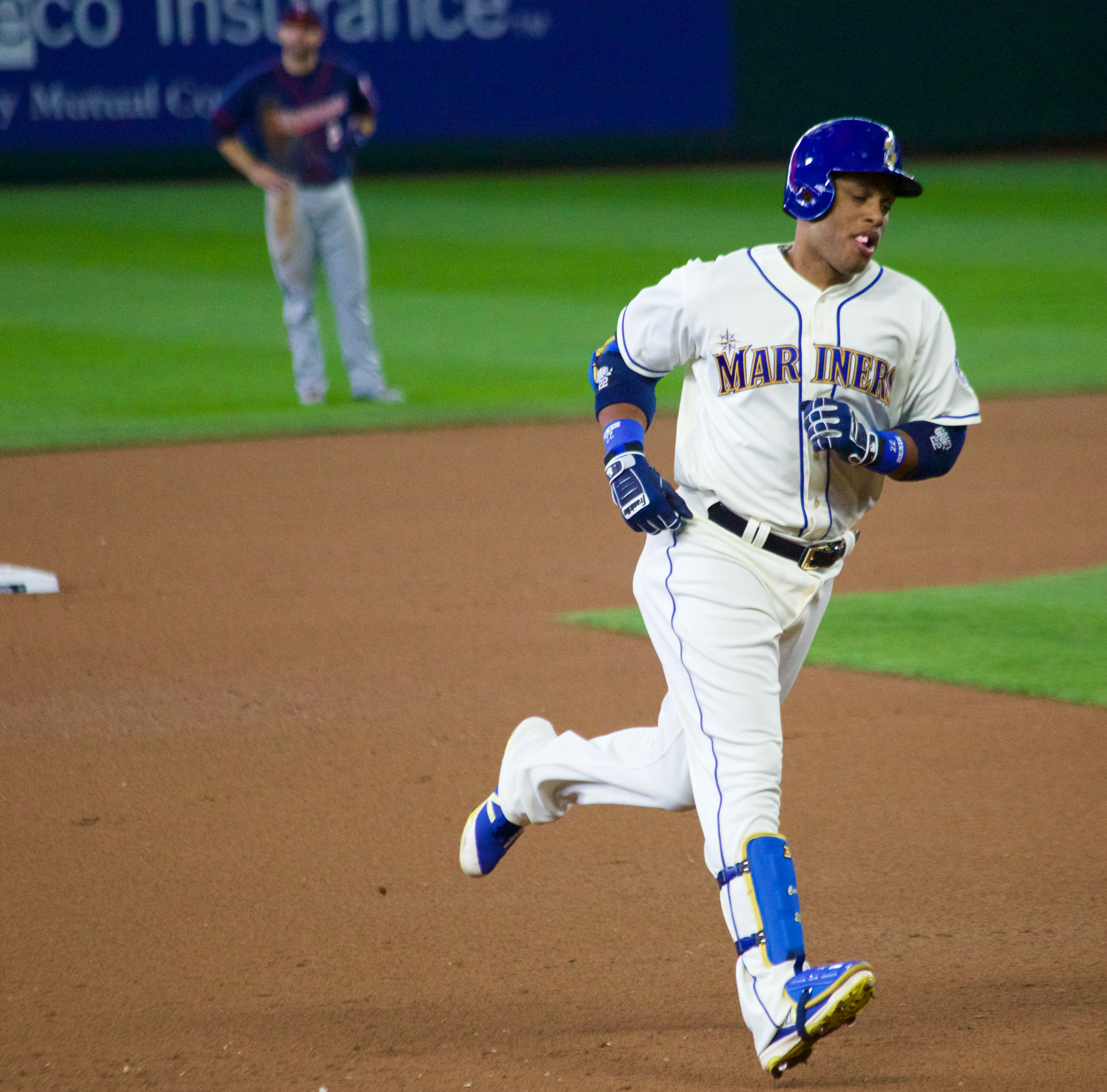
Canó with the Mariners in 2016

On May 7, 2016, Canó hit his 250th career home run, joining Joe Gordon and Jeff Kent as the only second basemen to reach 250 career home runs within the first 12 years of their career. He was selected to his seventh All-Star Game, played at Petco Park in San Diego. On August 28, Canó reached 30 home runs for the second time in his career, hitting it against the Chicago White Sox. In 161 games, Canó finished the season with a .298 batting average, 195 hits, 33 doubles, 39 home runs, and 103 RBI.

==== 2017: Eighth All-Star season ====
On May 16, 2017, the Mariners placed Canó on the 10-day disabled list due to a right quadriceps strain, retroactive to May 13. It was only the second time that Canó went on the disabled list in his career. In the All-Star Game at Marlins Park, Canó hit a home run in the top of the tenth inning off of Wade Davis that would give the American League a 2–1 win, earning him All-Star Game MVP honors. On September 13, Canó was ejected for the first time in his career for arguing with Vic Carapazza over a strike call. Canó hit his 300th career home run on September 21 versus Keone Kela of the Texas Rangers, becoming just the third second baseman in history to reach the milestone, following Jeff Kent (377) and Rogers Hornsby (301). The home run also made him the 16th major leaguer to bat at least .300 with 2,000 hits, 1,000 runs scored, 1,000 runs driven in, and 500 doubles.

==== 2018: Suspension-shortened season ====
Canó homered versus Lance McCullers Jr. in a 4–1 loss to the Houston Astros on April 18, 2018, to give him 302 for his career, and pass Hornsby for second place all-time among second basemen. On April 29, Canó hit his 100th home run as a member of the Mariners, versus Josh Tomlin in a 10–4 victory over the Cleveland Indians. On May 13, against the Tigers, Canó was hit by a pitch on the right hand, and left the game. His right hand was diagnosed with a fracture in the fifth metacarpal bone.

Two days into his injury, on May 15, Canó was suspended 80 games for testing positive for Furosemide, a diuretic better known as Lasix, which was a violation of MLB's performance-enhancing drugs policy. Canó returned to the Mariners on August 14, having served his suspension.

For the season, he batted .303/.374/.471.

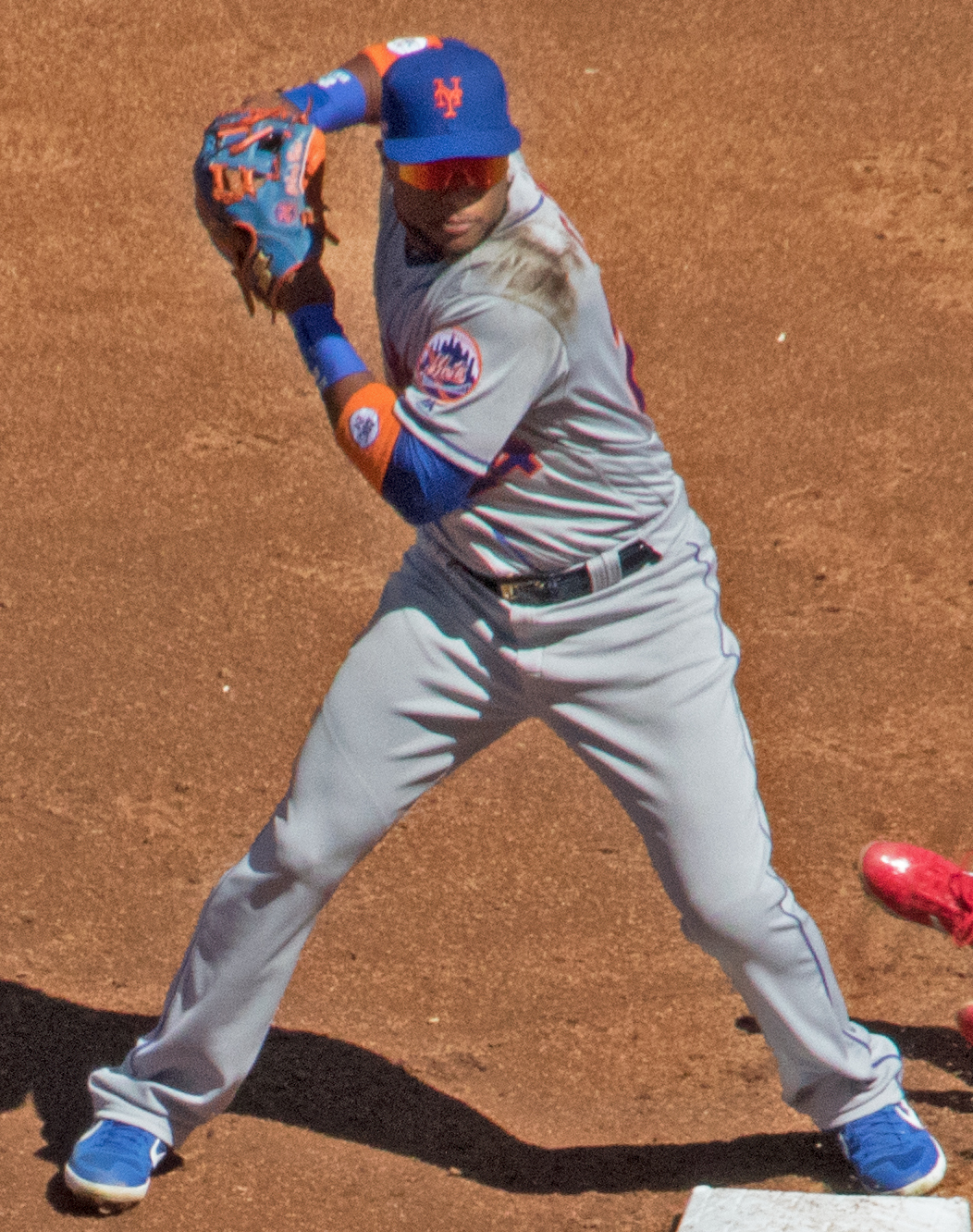
Canó with the Mets in 2019

=== New York Mets (2019–2022) ===
On December 3, 2018, the Mariners traded Canó, Edwin Díaz, and $20 million to the New York Mets for Jay Bruce, Jarred Kelenic, Anthony Swarzak, Gerson Bautista, and Justin Dunn, as part of the Mariners' rebuilding process.

In his first at bat as a Met, Canó hit a home run off of Max Scherzer of the Washington Nationals. However, after a first half of the season which included two stints on the injured list, a career-high strikeout rate, and an 'F' grade from Mike Puma of the New York Post, the Mets' trade for Canó was described as "a massive misstep" by Connor Byrne writing for MLB Trade Rumors, and as "an unmitigated disaster" by Mike Mazzeo of Yahoo Sports. On July 23, Canó had his first career three-home-run game and drove in all five of Mets runs against the San Diego Padres. Canó's second half saw a major improvement – he posted a second half OPS of .880, up from .646 OPS in the first half.

In 2019, Canó batted .256/.307/.428 with 13 home runs and a career-low 39 RBIs. He rebounded in the pandemic-shortened 2020 season. His .316/.352/.544 slash line was second on the team in batting average and slugging percentage and his 141 wRC+ was fourth. It proved to be his best offensive season since leaving the Yankees in terms of OPS+ and wRC+. After the 2020 season, he played for Dominican Republic in the 2021 Caribbean Series.

On November 18, 2020, Canó was suspended for 162 games after testing positive for stanozolol in violation of MLB's performance-enhancing drugs policy, rendering him ineligible for the entire 2021 season. This was his second time testing positive for a PED. Canó returned to the Mets in 2022. On May 2, the Mets designated Canó for assignment after he hit .195 with one home run in 41 at bats. He had only received sporadic playing time, often coming off the bench. On May 8, the Mets released Canó, making him a free agent.

=== San Diego Padres (2022) ===
On May 13, 2022, Canó signed a major league contract with the San Diego Padres. Canó batted .094 in 12 games for the Padres, with 10 strikeouts in 34 plate appearances, and was released by the Padres on June 2.

On June 10, Canó re-signed with the Padres on a minor league contract and was assigned to the El Paso Chihuahuas of the Triple-A Pacific Coast League.

=== Atlanta Braves (2022) ===
On July 10, 2022, the Padres traded Canó to the Atlanta Braves for cash considerations. He made his Braves debut against the New York Mets the next day. The Braves designated Canó for assignment on August 1, after acquiring Ehire Adrianza. Canó batted 4-for-26 (.154) in nine games for the Braves. He was released on August 4, becoming a free agent.

In aggregate, in 33 games and 100 at bats for three teams in 2022, he batted .150/.183/.190 with 4 walks and 25 strikeouts and was the slowest second baseman in the major leagues, with a sprint speed of 24.3 feet per second.

=== Dubai Wolves (2023) ===
In September 2023, Canó joined the ownership group of Baseball United, a professional baseball league based in Dubai. On October 23, 2023, he was selected sixth overall in the league's draft by the Dubai Wolves. During the league's inaugural all-star showcase, Cano batted leadoff for the United West All-Stars in both games and went a combined 2 for 7 with 2 doubles and a walk.

=== Diablos Rojos del México (2024–present) ===
On March 1, 2024, Canó signed with the Diablos Rojos del México of the Mexican League. In 78 games for the club, he batted .431/.475/.639 with 14 home runs and 77 RBI, won the league's batting title, and led the league in hits. With the team, Canó won the Serie del Rey.

On January 15, 2025, Cano re-signed with the Diablos. Canó lead the Diablos Rojos to an undefeated championship at the 2025 Baseball Champions League Americas in April 2025 and was named the tournament MVP. In 85 appearances for México, he hit .372/.426/.573 with 14 home runs and 86 RBI. With the team, Canó won his second consecutive Serie del Rey. He earned his 4,000th professional hit on September 15, during the third game of the Serie del Rey.

== International career ==
Canó has participated for his native Dominican Republic in four World Baseball Classic (WBC) tournaments, held in 2009, 2013, 2017, and 2023.

In the 2013 edition, Canó batted 15-for-32 (.469). The Dominican Republic defeated Puerto Rico 3–0 in the finals to win the championship and became the first undefeated team in the tournament's history. Canó was named the Most Valuable Player of the Classic. He joined Dominican Republic teammates Octavio Dotel and Santiago Casilla as part of the four players to ever have won a World Series and World Baseball Classic, after Daisuke Matsuzaka completed the feat. Twelve more players have gone on accomplish the feat, including David Robertson, with whom Cano won a World Series in 2009.

In 2017, Canó was named the captain of the Dominican Republic team. After going 3–0 in the first round, the Dominican Republic lost its first game to Puerto Rico which ended their streak of 11 straight wins dating back to the 2013 World Baseball Classic. The team failed to advance to the championship round and Canó finished 6-for-20 (.300) with a home run and 3 RBIs.

== Highlights ==
Championships earned or shared
Title	Times	Dates	Ref
American League champion	1	2009	
World Series champion	1	2009	
World Baseball Classic champion	1	2013	
Serie del Rey champion	1	2024	
Baseball Champions League Americas champion	1	2025	

Awards and exhibition team selections

- All-World Baseball Classic team (2013)
- 2× American League Player of the Month (September 2006, April 2010)
- 7× American League Player of the Week (September 18, 2005; July 22, 2007; August 5, 2007; May 30, 2010; August 22, 2010; July 1, 2012; May 8, 2016)
- Baseball America MLB Rookie All-Star at second base (2005)
- GIBBY/This Year in Baseball Awards for Rookie of the Year (2005)
- 3× Home Run Derby participant (2011–13)
- Home Run Derby Champion (2011)
- 8× MLB All-Star (2006, 2010–14, 2016, 2017)
  - Starting second baseman (2010–14)
- MLB All-Star Game MVP (2017)
- New York Yankees Minor League Player of the Year (2004)
- 2× Rawlings Gold Glove Award at second base (2010, 2012)
- 2× Wilson Defensive Player of the Year Award at second base (2012, 2013)
- 5× Silver Slugger Award at second base (2006, 2010–13)
- South Atlantic League All-Star at shortstop (2002)
- Staten Island Yankees (Class A) uniform number (17) retired (2007)
- 2× World Baseball Classic participant for Dominican Republic (2009, 2013)
- World Baseball Classic MVP (2013)
- Baseball Champions League Americas MVP (2025)

== Personal life ==
Canó has a son, also named Robinson, who lives with his mother in the Dominican Republic. He signed with the Miami Marlins on November 2, 2026 and intends to join the organization in 2028.

On November 13, 2012, Canó became a naturalized United States citizen.

Canó is noted for his charity work. Hackensack University Medical Center (in New Jersey) named a pediatric rehabilitation ward after him. In 2015, Canó opened a Montessori school in his hometown of San Pedro de Macoris.

== See also ==
- List of Major League Baseball players suspended for performance-enhancing drugs
- List of largest sports contracts
- List of Major League Baseball career assists leaders
- List of Major League Baseball career doubles leaders
- List of Major League Baseball career extra base hits leaders
- List of Major League Baseball career hits leaders
- List of Major League Baseball career home run leaders
- List of Major League Baseball career putouts as a second baseman leaders
- List of Major League Baseball career runs batted in leaders
- List of Major League Baseball career runs scored leaders
- List of Gold Glove Award winners at second base
- List of Silver Slugger Award winners at second base
- List of Major League Baseball players from the Dominican Republic
- List of second-generation Major League Baseball players
- New York Yankees award winners and league leaders

Awards and achievements
Preceded by Travis Hafner; Billy Butler	American League Player of the Month; September 2006; April 2010	Succeeded by Alex Rodriguez; David Ortiz
Preceded by Joe Blanton	American League Rookie of the Month; September 2005	Succeeded by Jonathan Papelbon
Preceded by Daisuke Matsuzaka	World Baseball Classic MVP; 2013	Succeeded by Marcus Stroman
