= Sports Lifetime Achievement Award =

The Sports Lifetime Achievement Award is a special award given away each year at the Sports Emmy Awards, given to a notable American sportscaster or sports TV executive. It was first given away in 1989. It is always announced days before the nominations are.

== List of recipients ==
- 1989: Jim McKay
- 1990: Lindsey Nelson
- 1991: Curt Gowdy
- 1992: Chris Schenkel
- 1993: Pat Summerall
- 1994: Howard Cosell
- 1995: Vin Scully
- 1996: Frank Gifford
- 1997: Jim Simpson
- 1998: Keith Jackson
- 1999: Jack Buck
- 2000: Dick Enberg
- 2001: Herb Granath
- 2002: Roone Arledge
- 2003: Ed Sabol and Steve Sabol
- 2004: Chet Simmons
- 2005: Bud Greenspan
- 2006: Don Ohlmeyer
- 2007: Frank Chirkinian
- 2008: Dick Ebersol
- 2009: John Madden
- 2010: Al Michaels
- 2011: Jack Whitaker
- 2012: Not awarded
- 2013: Ted Turner
- 2014: George Bodenheimer
- 2015: Verne Lundquist
- 2016: Brent Musburger
- 2017: Barry Frank
- 2018: Not awarded
- 2019: Dick Vitale
- 2020: Not awarded
- 2021: Lesley Visser
- 2022: Bryant Gumbel
- 2023: James Brown
- 2024: David Hill
