= 29th Sports Emmy Awards =

- Date: April 28, 2008
- Location: Frederick P. Rose Hall, Jazz at Lincoln Center, New York City

The 29th Sports Emmy Awards honoring American sports coverage in 2007 was presented on April 28, 2008 at Frederick P. Rose Hall in the Jazz at Lincoln Center, New York City. The nominees were announced on March 13.

== Awards ==
=== Programs ===
Outstanding Live Sports Special	Outstanding Live Sports Series
BCS on FOX: Tostitos Fiesta Bowl, FOX; 2007 Open Championship, ABC/ESPN; 2007 AFC Championship Game, CBS; 2007 Daytona 500, FOX; NFL Wild Card Playoff: Dallas vs. Seattle, NBC; Super Bowl XLI, CBS	NASCAR on FOX, FOX; Monday Night Football, ESPN; NBA on ESPN/NBA on ABC, ESPN/ABC; NBC Golf Tour, NBC; NFL on FOX, FOX; NBC Sunday Night Football, NBC
Outstanding Live Event Turnaround	Outstanding Edited Sports Special
Quest for the Cup, VOOM; De La Hoya vs Mayweather Delay Broadcast, HBO; Inside the PGA Tour, PGA Tour Productions; NFL Mic'd Up: Ravens vs. 49ers, NFL Network; 2007 Tour de France, CBS	De La Hoya-Mayweather 24/7, HBO; Super Bowl 360, ESPN; 2007 Ironman World Championship, NBC; The Natural: Major League Baseball Celebrates an Epic, ESPN2; Unsettled Scores, ESPN2
Outstanding Sports Documentary	Outstanding Edited Sports Series/Anthology
Ghosts of Flatbush, HBO; Barbaro: A Nation's Horse, NBC; Dale, NASCAR Images; Jonestown: The Game of Their Lives, ESPN; Triumph and Tragedy: The Ray Mancini Story, ESPN Classic	America's Game: The Super Bowl Champions, NFL Networks; Greatest High School Football Rivalries, Versus; Hard Knocks: Training Camp with the Kansas City Chiefs, HBO; HBO Boxing: Countdown Shows, HBO; Real Sports with Bryant Gumbel, HBO
Outstanding Studio Show, Weekly	Outstanding Studio Show, Daily
College Gameday, ESPN; [[Football Night in America, NBC; Inside the NBA, TNT; Inside the NFL, HBO; FOX NFL Sunday, FOX	Inside the NBA, TNT; NASCAR Now, ESPN2; Pardon the Interruption, ESPN; SportsCenter, ESPN; Wimbledon Tonight, NBC
Outstanding Sports Journalism	Outstanding Short Feature
Real Sports with Bryant Gumbel - Headgames: The NFL Concussion Crisis, HBO; Real Sports with Bryant Gumbel - Broken: The NFL Disability Debate, HBO; Real Sports with Bryant Gumbel - Dogfighting: Bred to Die, HBO; Real Sports with Bryant Gumbel - Fading Hope: Sports in Iraq, HBO	Sunday NFL Countdown - Fear, ESPN; College Gameday - Martin van Zant, ESPN; Inside the NFL - Coal Miner's Sons: The Jones Brothers, HBO; Inside the NFL - Packers Fans Rebuild, HBO; MLB 2007: Never Miss A Game - Never Too Early, ESPN
Outstanding Long Feature	Outstanding Open/Tease
NFL Films Presents: Finding Your Butkus, NFL Network; E:60 - Ray of Hope, ESPN; NBA TV Game Night - 59th and Prairie: Dwyane Wade's Journey - A Story Told by Terrence Howard, NBC TV; Outside the Lines - Still Alive, ESPN; The Super Bowl Today - Bill Walsh, CBS; The Super Bowl Today - Hines Ward, CBS	Super Bowl XLI - Tease, CBS; 107th U.S. Open Championship - The Open Returns to Steel City, NBC; 2007 Scripps National Spelling Bee - Championship Round, ABC; Barbaro: A Nation's Horse, NBC; De La Hoya-Mayweather 24/7 - Episode 1, HBO; Indianapolis 500 - Tease: All Roads Lead to Indy, ABC; NBA Playoffs - Opening Night Tease, TNT
Outstanding New Approaches - Coverage	Outstanding New Approaches - Long Form
Fantasy Football Now, ESPN.com; Amen Corner Live, CBSSports.com; Fantasy Focus Baseball, ESPN.com; Fantasy Football Live, Yahoo! Sports; Live@ Series, PGATour.com; NFL.com LIVE, NFL Network	Ray of Hope, ESPN.com; Kevin Streelman, 24 Hours to the PGA Tour, PGA Tour Productions; 2007 Shared Summits K2 Expedition, NBCSports.com; Fan Life: Full Tilt Full Time, HBO; Ruth Lovelace: Chasing a Dream, NBCSports.com
Outstanding New Approaches - General Interest	
Death Race 2007, ESPN.com; An UnAmerican Tragedy, ESPN.com; Anatomy of a Play, NFL Network; Don't Be Like Mike, ESPN.com; Inside Spring Training with the White Sox, 312 Media	

=== Personalities ===
Outstanding Sports Personality, Studio Host	Outstanding Sports Personality, Play-by-Play
James Brown, CBS; Al Trautwig, Versus; Bob Costas, HBO/NBC; Bryant Gumbel, HBO; Ernie Johnson, Jr., TNT/TBS	Al Michaels, NBC; Jim Lampley, HBO; Jim Nantz, CBS; Joe Buck, FOX; Marv Albert, TNT; Mike Emrick, NBC
Outstanding Sports Personality, Studio Analyst	Outstanding Sports Personality, Sports Event Analyst
Cris Collinsworth, HBO/NBC; Charles Barkley, TNT; Cris Carter, HBO; Jay Bilas, ESPN; Terry Bradshaw, FOX; Tom Jackson, ESPN	John Madden, NBC; Doug Collins, TNT; Gary Danielson, CBS; Phil Simms, CBS; Tim McCarver, FOX; Troy Aikman, FOX

=== Technical ===
Outstanding Technical Team Remote	Outstanding Technical Team Studio
ESPN NASCAR, ABC/ESPN/ESPN2; NASCAR on FOX, FOX; NBC Golf Tour, NBC; NFL on FOX, FOX; Red Bull Air Race World Series, FSN	MLB Postseason on TBS, TBS; Football Night in America, ABC; NASCAR on FOX, FOX; NFL on FOX: FOX NFL Sunday, FOX; The NFL Today, CBS
Outstanding Camera Work	Outstanding Editing
Mayweather-Hatton 24/7, HBO; Down the Barrel, ESPN2; Focused - Human Flight, Rush HD; Focused - The Future of Freestyle Skiing 2007, Rush HD; Inside the NFL, HBO; Road to the Super Bowl, NFL Network; 2007 Ironman World Championship, NBC	Ali's 65, ESPN; Hard Knocks: Training Camp With the Kansas City Chiefs, HBO; Mayweather-Hatton 24/7, HBO; Sports Science, FSN; Sunday NFL Countdown - Fear, ESPN; Super Bowl XLI, CBS
The Dick Schaap Writing Award	Outstanding Music Direction/Composition/Lyrics
Mayweather-Hatton 24/7, HBO; 2007 ING New York City Marathon - Alec Baldwin Open, NBC; Costas Now - The Year of the Cheat, HBO; E:60 - A Dream Come True: Gunnar Esiason, ESPN; Every Man a Tiger: The Eddie Robinson Story, NBC; Inside the NFL - Lewis Black: Miami Vice & Lonely in LA, HBO	Ghosts of Flatbush, HBO; Hard Knocks: Training Camp with the Kansas City Chiefs, HBO; NBA on TNT - NBA Promos on TNT, TNT; America's Game: The Super Bowl Champions, NFL Network; Barbaro, HBO; Dale, NASCAR Images; Kabul Girls Club, ESPN2; US Open Tennis Championship - Tease, CBS
Outstanding Live Event Audio/Sound	Outstanding Post Produced Audio/Sound
MLB on FOX, FOX; Arena Football, ABC/ESPN/ESPN2; NASCAR on FOX, FOX; NHL on NBC, NBC; World Championship Boxing]], HBO	MLB on FOX: Pre Game Show, FOX; US Open Tennis Championship, CBS; NFL on FOX: FOX NFL Sunday, FOX; Road to the Super Bowl, NFL Network
Outstanding Graphic Design	Outstanding Production Design/Art Direction
Sport Science, FSN; ESPN NASCAR, ABC/ESPN/ESPN2; Football Night in America/NBC Sunday Night Football, NBC; NBA on TNT - Playoffs, TNT; NBA Finals on ABC - Tease/Open, ABC	NBA All-Star Saturday Night - Tease and various re-teases, TNT; 107th U.S. Open Championship - The Open Returns to the Steel City, NBC; Amazing Sport Stories, FSN; BCS on FOX, FOX; NBA All-Star Game - Wasteland Tease, TNT; Sport Science, FSN
The George Wensel Technical Achievement Award	
PGA TOUR and LPGA Coverage - AimPoint, Golf Channel; ESPN NASCAR - Draft Track, ABC/ESPN/ESPN2; Golf on CBS - Swing Vision, CBS; Jim Nantz Remembers Augusta - The 1960 Masters - Color Restoration and Colorization, CBS; Sport Science - Sport Science Laboratory, FSN	

Sports Lifetime Achievement Award

- Frank Chirkinian, Golf producer
