= 30th Sports Emmy Awards =

- Date: April 27, 2009
- Location: Frederick P. Rose Hall, Jazz at Lincoln Center, New York City

The 30th Sports Emmy Awards were presented on April 27, 2009 in the Frederick P. Rose Hall at Lincoln Center in New York City. The nominees were announced on April 2.

== Awards ==
=== Programs ===
Outstanding Live Sports Special	Outstanding Live Sports Series
2008 U.S. Open Golf Championship, NBC; NASCAR on FOX - Daytona 500, FOX; Super Bowl XLII, FOX; Wimbledon Gentlemen's Final, NBC; X Games XIV, ESPN	NBC Sunday Night Football, NBC; College Football on ESPN, ABC; Monday Night Football, ESPN; NASCAR on TNT, TNT; NASCAR on FOX, FOX
Outstanding Live Event Turnaround	Outstanding Edited Sports Special
Games of the XXIX Olympiad, NBC; 2008 Bassmaster Classic, ESPN2; 2008 Tour de France, CBS; 2008 World Series of Poker: Final Table, ESPN; Inside the PGA Tour, Golf Channel; The Deutsche Bank Championship, PGA Tour Productions	Calzaghe-Jones 24/7, HBO; 2008 Beijing Paralympics, NBC; 2008 Ironman World Championship, NBC; The Greatest Game Ever Played, ESPN; Varsity Rivals, CBS
Outstanding Sports Documentary	Outstanding Sports Series/Anthology
Breaking the Huddle: The Integration of College Football, HBO; Big Ten Short Stories - Friends of Jaclyn Special Edition, Big Ten Network; Joe Louis: America's Hero Betrayed, HBO; Jose Canesco: Last Shot, A&E; The Streak, ESPN2	De La Hoya-Pacquiao 24/7, HBO; America's Game: The Missing Rings, NFL Network; Baseball's Golden Age, FSN; HBO Boxing: Countdown Shows, HBO; Real Sports with Bryant Gumbel, HBO; Road to Redemption, ESPN; Sport Science', FSN
Outstanding Studio Show, Weekly	Outstanding Studio Show, Daily
Inside the NFL, CBS/Showtime; College GameDay, ESPN; Football Night in America, NBC; FOX NFL Sunday, FOX; Monday Night Countdown, ESPN; Sunday Night Countdown, ESPN	Inside the NBA, TNT; Baseball Tonight, ESPN; MLB Postseason Studio, TBS; Outside the Lines First Report, ESPN; Pardon the Interruption, ESPN
Outstanding Sports Journalism	Outstanding Short Feature
Real Sports with Bryant Gumbel - Horse Slaughter: Running for Their Lives, HBO; E:60 - Gymnastics Abuse, ESPN; Outside the Lines - Concerns in Happy Valley, ESPN; Outside the Lines - O.J. Mayo's Inner Circle, ESPN; Real Sports with Bryant Gumbel - NFL Stadium Drinking, HBO	2008 NCAA Basketball on CBS - Jason Ray Feature, CBS; E:60 - The Power of One - Adam Bender, ESPN; Outside the Lines - John Challis, ESPN; Outside the Lines - Roller Derby Revival, ESPN; Outside the Lines - Touching Them All, ESPN
Outstanding Long Feature	Outstanding Open/Tease
Outside the Lines - Richard Jensen, ESPN; 2008 NCAA Basketball on CBS - Final Four - Zambia's Hope Feature, CBS; Outside the Lines - Kick for Nick, ESPN; Outside the Lines - Louis Mulkey, ESPN	NFL on FOX - Super Bowl XLII - Perfection, FOX; ESPN NASCAR - Indianapolis 500, ABC; Games of the XXIX Olympiad: The Clock of Their Lives, NBC; NBA All-Star Game - Chris Rock All-Star Tease, TNT; Saturday Night Football - Baltimore Ravens at Dallas Cowboys, NFL Network
Outstanding New Approaches Sports Event Coverage	Outstanding New Approaches Sports Programming
Games of the XXIX Olympiad - Beyond the Broadcast, NBCOlympics.com/NBC Sports; NASCAR.com Race Buddy, NASCAR.com; NBA League Pass Broadband, NBA.com; NBA.com - TNT OverTime 2008 All-Star Saturday, NBA.com; NFL Sunday Ticket Experience, DIRECTV; NFL.com LIVE: Thursday and Saturday Night Football, NFL.com	Sport Science, FSN; Amazing Sport Stories, FSN; Ring Life, HBO.com/HBO Sports; YouTube Baby, ESPN.com
Outstanding New Approaches - Sports Programming - Short Format	
No Love Lost, ESPN.com; Anatomy of a Play, NFL Network/NFL.com; Back on Topps, BackOnTopps.com/The Tornante Company/El Chopper Quatro; Mayne Street, ESPN.com; NFL Ultimate Audio on NFL.com, NFL Network/NFL.com; Outside the Ropes, PGATour.com/PGA Tour Productions	

=== Personalities ===
Outstanding Sports Personality, Studio Host	Outstanding Sports Personality, Play-by-Play
Bob Costas, NBC/HBO; Bryant Gumbel, HBO; Chris Berman, ESPN; Ernie Johnson, Jr., TNT/TBS; James Brown, CBS/Showtime	Jim Nantz, CBS; Al Michaels, NBC; Dan Hicks, NBC; Joe Buck, FOX; Mike Emrick, NBC
Outstanding Sports Personality, Studio Analyst	Outstanding Sports Personality, Sports Event Analyst
Terry Bradshaw, FOX; Tom Jackson, ESPN; Cris Collinsworth, NBC/Showtime/CBS/HBO; John Kruk, ESPN; Steve Mariucci, NFL Network	Cris Collinsworth, NFL Network/NBC; Doug Collins, TNT; John Madden, NBC; Johnny Miller, NBC; Ron Jaworski, ESPN; Tim McCarver, FOX

=== Technical ===
Outstanding Technical Team Remote	Outstanding Technical Team Studio
Games of the XXIX Olympiad, NBC; Red Bull Air Race World Series, FSN; 2008 Winter X Games, ESPN/ABC; ESPN Monday Night Football, ESPN; ESPN NASCAR, ABC/ESPN/ESPN2; NASCAR on FOX, FOX	ESPN NASCAR, ABC/ESPN/ESPN2; Games of the XXIX Olympiad, NBC; MLB Postseason, TBS; Sport Science, FSN; Sunday NFL Countdown, ESPN
Outstanding Camera Work	Outstanding Editing
Games of the XXIX Olympiad - The Clock of Their Lives, NBC; 2008 Masters Tournament, ESPN; 2008 NCAA Basketball on CBS - Final Four - Zambia's Hope, CBS; Amazing Sports Stories, FSN; Calzaghe-Jones 24/7, HBO; Quest for the Cup, VOOM	Calzaghe-Jones 24/7, HBO; Amazing Sports Stories - Joe Jenette: The Fighter Who Refused to Quit, FSN; Games of the XXIX Olympiad - Olympic Profiles, NBC; Games of the XXIX Olympiad - Remember the Titans, NBC; NBA on TNT, TNT; The Wimbledon Championships, ESPN
The Dick Schaap Writing Award	Outstanding Music Composition/Direction/Lyrics
NBA on TNT, TNT; Baseball's Golden Age, FSN; British Open, TNT; De La Hoya-Pacquiao 24/7, HBO; FOX NFL Sunday - Super Bowl XLII - Perfection, FOX; NFL Films Presents: Lost in Confetti, NFL Network	NFL on CBS, CBS; 2008 Masters Tournament - Open, ESPN; E:60 - Homeless Hoops, ESPN; ESPN Sunday Night Baseball - Final Game at Yankee Stadium - Opening Tease, ESPN; Hard Knocks: Training Camp with the Dallas Cowboys, HBO; NFL on CBS - AFC Championship Game Tease, CBS
Outstanding Live Event Audio/Sound	Outstanding Post Produced Audio/Sound
NFL on FOX, FOX; ESPN NASCAR, ABC/ESPN/ESPN2; Games of the XXIX Olympiad, NBC; MLB on FOX, FOX; NASCAR on FOX, FOX	Calzaghe-Jones 24/7, HBO; Hard Knocks: Training Camp with the Dallas Cowboys, HBO; MLB '08: An Epic Season - Wireless, ESPN; Road to the Super Bowl, FOX
Outstanding Graphic Design	Outstanding Production Design/Art Direction
Sport Science, FSN; E:60 - 2008 Season, ESPN; Games of the XXIX Olympiad, NBC; MLB on FOX, FOX; NBA on ABC - 2008 NBA Finals, ABC/ESPN; Super Bowl XLII/FOX NFL Sunday, FOX	NFL on CBS - AFC Championship Game Tease, CBS; Amazing Sports Stories, FSN; 2008 World Figure Skating Championships, ABC/ESPN; Sport Science, FSN; The Seacret Game, ESPN Classic
The George Wensel Technical Achievement Award	Outstanding Sports Promotional Announcement - Institutional
Virtual Playbook/Augmented Reality, ESPN; ESPN Axis, ESPN/ESPN2/ESPNews; ESPN NASCAR, ABC/ESPN2; Games of the XXIX Olympiad - NBC's Three Screens Olympics (Beijing & at Home), NBC	MLB All-Star Game 2008 - Raftors, FOX; 2008 Fantasy Football - Blues, NFL Network; ESPN Monday Night Football - Is it Monday Yet? - Alarm Clocks, Customers, Cubicles, ESPN; NBA Playoffs on TNT - Terrence Howard Tease, TNT; This is SportsCenter - More Hips, Conditioning Coach, Explosive Speed, ESPN
Outstanding Sports Promotional Announcement - Episodic	
2009 Winter Classic, NBC/NHL; NASCAR on FOX 2008 - Engine City, FOX; 2008 NFL Training Camp - In Rhythm, NFL Network/NFL.com; ESPN Monday Night Football - Is it Monday Yet? - Customers, Cubicles, Class, ESPN; NBC Sunday Night Football - Kick-Off Weekend - Manning Brothers, NBC	
