= 36th Sports Emmy Awards =

- Date: May 5, 2015
- Location: Frederick P. Rose Hall, Jazz at Lincoln Center, New York City

The 36th Sports Emmy Awards was presented on May 5, 2015 at the Frederick P. Rose Hall at the Jazz at Lincoln Center in New York City. George Bodenheimer, former ESPN president, was honored with the Lifetime Achievement Award for Sports.

== Awards ==
Winners in BOLD

=== Programs ===
Outstanding Live Sports Special	Outstanding Live Sports Series
**Super Bowl XLIX, NBC**; 146th Belmont Stakes, NBC; 2014 FIFA World Cup Final, ABC; College Football Playoff National Championship, ESPN, Oregon vs. Ohio State; Daytona 500, FOX	**NASCAR on FOX, FOX**; ESPN College Football, ABC/ESPN/SEC Network; ESPN Monday Night Football, ESPN; Sunday Night Football, NBC
Outstanding Edited Sports Coverage	Outstanding Edited Sports Special
**Super Bowl XLVIII, NFL Network**; All Access - Epilogue: Mayweather vs. Maidana, Showtime; Derek Jeter: Night 2 Remember, Fox Sports 1; Ironman World Championship, NBC; NFL Turning Point, NBCSN	**E:60 - Dream On: Stories of Boston's Strongest, ESPN2**; Football America: Our Stories, FOX; Mr. Baseball: Bob Uecker, MLB Network
Outstanding Playoff Coverage	Outstanding Sports Documentary
**NFC Championship Game, FOX, Green Bay Packers vs. Seattle Seahawks**; NASCAR Chase for the Cup, ESPN; National League Championship Series, Fox Sports 1, San Francisco Giants vs. St. Louis Cardinals; NCAA March Madness, tbs/CBS/TNT/truTV; NFL Playoffs - Pittsburgh Steelers vs. Baltimore Ravens & Baltimore Ravens vs. New England Patriots, NBC	**We Could Be King, ESPNews**; McConkey, Starz; Payne, Golf Channel; SEC Storied - It's Time, SEC Network
Outstanding Sports Documuentary Series	Outstanding Studio Show - Weekly
**30 for 30, ESPN**; **All Access, Showtime**; 24/7, HBO; A Football Life, NFL Network; Hard Knocks, HBO; Undrafted, NFL Network	**College GameDay, ESPN Football**; Football Night in America, NBC; Inside the NBA on TNT, TNT; Sunday NFL Countdown, ESPN
Outstanding Studio Show - Daily	Outstanding Sports News Anthology
**MLB Tonight, MLB Network**; Inside the NBA on TNT: Playoffs, TNT; NFL Live, ESPN2; Pardon the Interruption, ESPN; SportsCenter, ESPN	**Real Sports with Bryant Gumbel, HBO**; E:60, ESPN2; Outside the Lines, ESPN
Outstanding Sports Journalism	Outstanding Short Feature
**Real Sports with Bryant Gumbel - Kids & Guns, HBO**; 60 Minutes Sports - Phil Ivey, Showtime; Real Sports with Bryant Gumbel - Death on the Track, HBO; Real Sports with Bryant Gumbel - Higher Education?, HBO; Real Sports with Bryant Gumbel - Sport in Qatar: Price of Glory, HBO	**FOX Sports Live - Corked: The Albert Belle Bat Heist, FOX Sports**; E:60 - Loud and Proud, ESPN2; Inside the NFL - The Final Stitch, Showtime; Road to the Final Four - Buzz's Bunch, CBS; Sunday NFL Countdown - Danny's Day, ESPN; The NFL Today - Homes for Wounded Warriors: Jared Allen, CBS
Outstanding Long Feature	Outstanding Open/Tease
**E:60 - Owen and Haatchi, ESPN2**; E:60 - Catching Kayla, ESPN2; SportsCenter – SC Featured - Lauren Hill: One More Game, ESPN; SportsCenter – SC Featured - Pete's Challenge, ESPN; XXII Olympic Winter Games - Long Way Home: The Jessica Long Story, NBC	**E:60 - Dream On: Stories of Boston's Strongest, ESPN2**; 2014 Baseball Hall of Fame Induction Ceremony - Hall of Heroes, MLB Network; College Football on CBS - The Army-Navy Game: A Different Kind of Game, CBS; MLB on tbs Postseason – One-Man Show, tbs; NCAA March Madness - March Madness Tease, tbs/CBS/TNT/truTV; NFL on CBS - AFC Championship 2013: Would You Watch, CBS
Outstanding New Approaches – Sports Event Coverage	Outstanding New Approaches – Sports Programming
**XXII Olympic Winter Games, NBC Olympics**; College Football Playoff National Championship, ESPN/WatchESPN; ESPN Sport Science, ESPN; NCAA March Madness, tbs/TNT/truTV	**XXII Olympic Winter Games, NBC Olympics**; Anatomy of a Pitch, ESPN; Enduring Guilt; Games of Zones, Bleacher Report; Together We Make Football, NFL Films
Outstanding New Approaches - Sports Programming - Short Format	Outstanding Sports Promotional Announcement
**Captain's Curtain Call, FOX Sports**; NFL UP!, NFL Digital Media; PK Thanks Chicago, MLB; Putt Putt Perfection, Grantland	**2014 FIFA World Cup - World Cup Big Event/Time Zone/I Believe, ABC/ESPN/ESPN2**; MLB on Fox Sports 1 – MLB Awareness Campaign - Ready/Working/Sweet, Fox Sports 1; MLB on tbs Postseason - One-Man Show, tbs; Monuments, MLB Network; NBC Sports - Best Seat, NBC/NBCSN
Outstanding Live Sports Coverage in Spanish	Outstanding Studio Show in Spanish
**2014 FIFA World Cup, Univision**; Futebol Estelar - Leon vs. Pachua, Telemundo; Futebol Estelar - Premier League Championship Sunday, Telemundo/Mun2; NASCAR Toyota 120, Mun2; Super Bowl XLIX, NBCUniverso	**Futebol Central, Univision**; Contacto Deportivo, Univision; Fuera de Juego, ESPN Deportes; SportsCenter Deportes, ESPN Deportes; Univision Deportes Futbol Club, Univision

=== Technical ===
Outstanding Technical Team Remote	Outstanding Technical Team Studio
**XXII Olympic Winter Games, NBC**; ESPN College Football, ESPN; Golf on CBS, CBS; NASCAR on FOX, FOX/FOX Sports 1	**Premier League, NBC**; Football Night in America, NBC; Super Bowl XLVIII, FOX Sports; MLB Tonight, MLB Network
Outstanding Camera Work	Outstanding Short Form Editing
**2014 FIFA World Cup, ABC/ESPN**; 24/7 – Cotto - Martinez, HBO; FOX Sports Live - Terrance West: "Football, Family, and NFL Dreams" , FOX Sports 1; Inside the NFL - Super Bowl XLIX Season 7 Finale, Showtime; Ironman World Championship, NBC; NFL Films Presents - Shots of the Year, NFL Network	**FOX Sports Live - Corked: The Albert Belle Bat Heist, FOX Sports**; FOX Sports Live - Captain's Curtain Call, FOX Sports; FOX Sports Live - Driven: Jay Blake, FOX Sports; NBA on TNT - Kendrick Lamar "I" , TNT; XXII Olympic Winter Games - Profiles of the XXII Olympic Winter Games, NBC; XXII Olympic Winter Games - Remember the Titans, NBC
Outstanding Long Form Editing	Dick Schaap Outstanding Writing Award
**FOX Sports Live - Finding Rico Harris: The Vanishing Man, FOX Sports**; All Access - Epilogue: Mayweather vs. Madiana II, Showtime; Deep Dive, National Geographic Channel; Hard Knocks - Training Camp with the Atlanta Falcons, HBO; Inside the NFL - Super Bowl XLIX, Showtime; Notre Dame: Reborn, NBC; The Third Team, MLB Network; XXII Olympic Winter Games - Long Way Home: The Jessica Long Story, NBC	**XXII Olympic Winter Games - Winter's Theater, NBC**; 60 Minutes Sports - All Blacks, Showtime; E:60 - Owen and Haatchi, ESPN2; MLB on tbs Postseason - One-Man Show, tbs; XXII Olympic Winter Games - Lokomotiv, NBC
Outstanding Music Composition/Direction/Lyrics	Outstanding Live Event Audio/Sound
**Hard Knocks - Training Camp with the Atlanta Falcons, HBO**; 2014 Baseball Hall of Fame Induction Ceremony - Hall of Heroes, MLB Network; 2014 FIFA World Cup - Six Degrees, ABC/ESPN/ESPN2; Road to the Super Bowl, FOX; SEC Storied - It's Time, SEC Network	**MLB on FOX, FOX/FOX Sports 1**; HBO Boxing, HBO; NASCAR on FOX, FOX/FOX Sports 1; NFL on FOX, FOX; XXII Olympic Winter Games, NBC/NBCSN/CNBC/USA/MSNBC
Outstanding Post-Produced Audio/Sound	Outstanding Live Graphic Design
**XXII Olympic Winter Games - Winter's Theater, NBC**; FOX Sports Live - Walking Dead: The Charlie Rowan Story, FOX Sports 1; Hard Knocks - Training Camp with the Atlanta Falcons, HBO; Inside the NFL - Super Bowl XLIX Season 7 Finale, Showtime; MLB on tbs Postseason - One-Man Show, tbs; NBA on TNT, TNT	**XXII Olympic Winter Games, NBC/NBCSN/CNBC/USA/MSNBC**; 2014 FIFA World Cup, ABC/ESPN/ESPN2; MLB on FOX, FOX/FOX Sports 1; SportsCenter, ESPN; Sunday Night Football, NBC; Super Bowl XLIX, NBC
Outstanding Post-Produced Graphic Design	Outstanding Studio Design/Art Direction
**ESPN Monday Night Football, ESPN**; 2014 NBA draft; ESPN Sport Science, ABC/ESPN/ESPN2; Grantland Basketball Hour, ESPN	**SportsCenter, ESPN**; FOX NFL Sunday, FOX; Sunday NFL Countdown, NFL Live, NFL Insiders, Monday Night Countdown, NFL PrimeTime, ESPN; XXII Olympic Winter Games, NBC/NBCSN
Outstanding Production Design/Art Direction	George Wensel Technical Achievement Award
**2014 Baseball Hall of Fame Induction Ceremony - Hall of Heroes, MLB Network**; MLB on tbs Postseason - One-Man Show, tbs; Sunday Night Football - Waiting All Day For Sunday Night Open, NBC; Super Bowl XLIX - Waiting All Day For a Super Bowl Fight Open, NBC	**XXII Olympic Winter Games - Maximum Access, NBC**; 2014 NBA All-Star Weekend - Free D Replay System, TNT; ESPN Monday Night Football - VFX, ESPN; IP Production, PAC-12 Network; SportsCenter, NFL Countdown, and NFL Primetime - ESPN Digital Center 2, ESPN/ESPN2/ESPNews

=== Personalities ===
Outstanding Sports Personality - Studio Host	Outstanding Sports Personality - Play-by-Play
**Ernie Johnson, TNT**; Bob Costas, NBC/MLB Network; Rich Eisen, NFL Network/DirecTV; Keith Olbermann, ESPN2; Stuart Scott, ESPN; Matt Vasgersian, MLB Network	**Mike Emrick, NBC**; Mike Breen, ABC/ESPN; Bob Costas, MLB Network; Ian Eagle, tbs/CBS/TNT/truTV; Dan Hicks, NBC/Golf Channel
Outstanding Sports Personality - Studio Analyst	Outstanding Sports Personality - Sports Event Analyst
**Harold Reynolds, MLB Network**; Charles Barkley, TNT; Rick Neuheisel PAC-12 Network; Tom Verducci MLB Network	**Cris Collinsworth, NBC**; Jon Gruden, ESPN; Jeff Van Gundy, ABC/ESPN; Kirk Herbstreit, ABC/ESPN; Harold Reynolds, FOX/FOX Sports 1/MLB Network
Outstanding Sports Personality - Sports Reporter	Outstanding On-Air Sports Personality in Spanish
**Ken Rosenthal, FOX/FOX Sports 1/MLB Network**; Holly Rowe, ESPN/espnW; Lisa Salters, ESPN; Michele Tafoya, NBC; Tom Verducci, MLB Network	**Ernesto Jerez, ESPN Deportes**; Enrique Bermudez, Univision; Andres Cantor, Telemundo; Jose Ramon Fernandez, ESPN Deportes; Marion Reimers, FOX Deportes

=== Lifetime Achievement Award ===
George Bodenheimer

== Awards by Network Group ==
Group	Award-Winning Networks	Winners
ESPN	ESPN, ESPN 2, ABC, ESPN Deportes, ESPNews	11
NBC Sports Group	NBC, NBCSN, CNBC, MSNBC, USA, nbcolympics.com	11
FOX Sports Media Group	FOX, FOX Sports 1, FOXsports.com	9
MLB Media	MLB Network	4
HBO Sports		3
Univision		2
CBS	Showtime	1
NFL Media	NFL Network	1
Turner Sports	TNT	1
