= 27th Sports Emmy Awards =

- Date: May 1, 2006
- Location: Frederick P. Rose Hall, Jazz at Lincoln Center, New York City

The 27th Sports Emmy Awards honoring American sports coverage in 2005 were presented on May 1, 2006 at Frederick P. Rose Hall in the Jazz at Lincoln Center, New York City. The nominees were announced on March 29.

== Nominations ==
Winners are in bold

=== Outstanding Live Sports Special ===
- 2005 Little League World Series (ABC/ESPN)
- 2005 Masters Tournament (CBS)
- **2005 Open Championship (TNT)**
- 2005 Preakness Stakes (NBC)
- 2005 World Series (FOX)

=== Outstanding Live Sports Series ===
- ESPN College Football (ESPN)
- ESPN Sunday Night Football (ESPN)
- Monday Night Football (ABC)
- **NASCAR on Fox** **(FOX)**
- NFL on CBS (CBS)

=== Outstanding Live Event Turnaround ===
- **Best of Winter X Games IX (ABC/ESPN Productions)**
- Beyond the Wheel - Brickyard 400 (Speed Channel/NASCAR Images)
- NBA Players Hurricane Relief (TNT)
- NFL Network Game of the Week Special Edition: Lions vs Bucs (NFL Network/NFL Films)
- 2005 Tour de France (CBS)

=== Outstanding Edited Sports Special ===
- 57th USGA Girls Junior Amateur Championship (NBC)
- Baseball Is... (ESPN2/MLB Productions)
- Chasing Lance: #7 (Discovery Channel/Colorado Production Group)
- **CostasNOW - David Robinson: A Man in Full (HBO)**
- Ray Romano & Kevin James: Making the Cut (HBO/441 Productions)

=== Outstanding Sports Documentary ===
- Dare to Dream: The Story of the U.S. Women's Soccer Team (HBO)
- Mantle (HBO/Camaro Films)
- Perfect Upset (HBO)
- **Rhythm in the Rope** **(ESPN2)**
- You Write Better Than You Play: The Frank Deford Story (ESPN Classic)

=== Outstanding Edited Sports Series/Anthology ===
- Beyond the Glory (Fox Sports Net/Asylum Entertainment)
- Real Sports with Bryant Gumbel (HBO)
- **SportsCentury** **(ESPN Classic)**
- Timeless (ESPN2/Red Line Films)
- The Top 5 Reasons You Can't Blame... (ESPN Classic)

=== Outstanding Studio Show - Weekly ===
- College GameDay (ESPN)
- Fox NFL Sunday (FOX)
- Inside the NBA (TNT)
- **Inside the NFL** **(HBO)**
- NASCAR on Fox Pre Race Show (FOX)

=== Outstanding Studio Show - Daily ===
- Baseball Tonight (ESPN)
- The Best Damn Sports Show Period (Fox Sports Net)
- **Inside the NBA playoff shows** **(TNT)**
- Pardon the Interruption (ESPN)
- SportsCenter (ESPN)

=== Outstanding Sports Personality, Studio Host ===
- James Brown (FOX)
- **Bob Costas (NBC/HBO)**
- Rich Eisen (NFL Network/CBS)
- Bryant Gumbel (HBO)
- John Saunders (ABC/ESPN)

=== Outstanding Sports Personality, Play-by-Play ===
- **Joe Buck (FOX)**
- Keith Jackson (ABC)
- Jim Lampley (HBO)
- Al Michaels (ABC)
- Jim Nantz (CBS)

=== Outstanding Sports Personality, Studio Analyst ===
- **Cris Collinsworth (HBO)**
- Kirk Herbstreit (ESPN)
- Tom Jackson (ESPN)
- Howie Long (FOX)
- Harold Reynolds (ESPN)

=== Outstanding Sports Personality, Sports Event Analyst ===
- Troy Aikman (FOX)
- **John Madden (ABC)**
- Tim McCarver (FOX)
- Johnny Miller (NBC)
- Joe Morgan (ESPN)

=== Outstanding Technical Team Remote ===
- ESPN Sunday Night Football (ESPN)
- **NASCAR on FOX**: **2005 Daytona 500 (FOX)**
- NASCAR on NBC / TNT (NBC/TNT)
- Winter X Games IX (ABC/ESPN Productions)

=== Outstanding Technical Team Studio ===
- **2005 NBA draft (ESPN)**
- 2005 NFL draft (ESPN)
- This is SportsCenter (ESPN)

=== Outstanding Camera Work ===
- **Cinderella Man: The James J. Braddock Story** **(ESPN2/Red Line Films)**
- ESPN Sunday Night Football - Teases (ESPN)
- Timeless - Ann Wolfe (ESPN2/Red Line Films)
- X Games XI - Surfing (ABC/ESPN Productions)

=== Outstanding Editing ===
- Chasing Lance: #7 (Discovery Channel/Colorado Production Group)
- NASCAR on TNT - Teases (TNT)
- NBA on TNT Thursdays - Teases (TNT)
- 2005 NCAA Men's Basketball Championship Game - Tease (CBS)
- **PGA Tour Sunday - Kevin Hall (USA/PGA Tour Productions)**
- Timeless - Prison Chess (ESPN2/Red Line Films)
- Wimbledon on NBC - Teases (NBC)

=== The Dick Schaap Outstanding Writing Award ===
- 2005 French Open - I Want My Kids to be Claycourters (ESPN2)
- NASCAR Championship Chase - The Chase for the 2005 Nextel Cup (Speed Channel/NASCAR Images)
- **SportsCenter - Finding Bobby Fischer ~ written by Jeremy Schaap** **(ESPN)**
- The Final Four - Hoop Dreams (CBS)
- 2005 Tour de France (CBS)

=== Outstanding Music Composition/Direction/Lyrics ===
- Mantle (HBO/Camaro Films)
- Rhythm in the Rope (ESPN2)
- The NFL Today Rise to Glory - The NFL Today Tease (CBS)
- **2005 World Figure Skating Championships - Teases, Bumps and Rollout (ESPN)**
- You Write Better Than You Play: The Frank Deford Story (ESPN Classic)

=== Outstanding Live Event Audio/Sound ===
- ESPN Sunday Night Baseball (ESPN)
- Great Outdoor Games (ESPN)
- **HBO World Championship Boxing** **(HBO)**
- **NASCAR on Fox** **(FOX)**

=== Outstanding Post-Produced Audio/Sound ===
- Cinderella Man: The James J. Braddock Story (ESPN2/Red Line Films)
- **2005 Indianapolis 500 - Speed City Tease (ABC)**
- Inside the NFL - Sounds of the NFL (HBO/NFL Films)
- NBA on TNT Thursdays - Teases (TNT)

=== Outstanding Graphic Design ===
- Monday Night Football - Show Graphics (ABC)
- Howie Long's Tough Guys (FOX)
- Lincoln Financial Battle at the Bridges - Tease (ABC)
- **NFL on FOX**: **Super Bowl XXXIX (FOX)**

=== Outstanding Production Design/Art Direction ===
- Monday Night Football - Teases (ABC)
- **Cinderella Man: The James J. Braddock Story** **(ESPN2/Red Line Films)**
- NBA on TNT - New Studio Set (TNT)
- Super Bowl XXXIX Pre Game Show - Opens and Features (FOX)

=== The George Wensel Outstanding Innovative Technical Achievement Award ===
- FLW Outdoors - Speciality Miniature Cameras (Fox Sports Net/FLW Outdoors Productions)
- **Golf on CBS** **- SwingVision (CBS)**
- MLB on FOX - FoxTrax (FOX)

=== Outstanding Achievement In Content For Non-Traditional Delivery Platforms ===
- Baseball's Best Moments Webcast on MLB.com (MLB.com)
- E - Ticket: The Wizard at 95 Webcast on ESPN.com (ESPN.com)
- **Off Mikes Webcast on ESPN.com** **(ESPN.com/Animax Entertainment)**
- The Sports Guy Webcast on ESPN.com (ESPN.com/Funny Garbage Productions)

=== Outstanding Sports Journalism ===
- **Real Sports with Bryant Gumbel - Soccer Racism** **(HBO)**
- Real Sports with Bryant Gumbel - The Nanny (HBO)
- SportsCenter - Finding Bobby Fischer (ESPN)

=== Outstanding Short Feature ===
- 2005 Kentucky Derby - Afleet Alex (NBC)
- SportsCenter - A Boy's Wish (ESPN)
- **Timeless - Lama Kunga** **(ESPN2/Red Line Films)**

=== Outstanding Long Feature ===
- **Real Sports with Bryant Gumbel - The Hoyts** **(HBO)**
- SportsCenter - Clay Dyer (ESPN)
- SportsCenter Presents: Stories of Inspiration - Choose Life: Emmanuel Ofosu Yeboah & Jim MacLaren (ESPN/LOOKALIKE Production)
- The Final Four - Hoop Dreams (CBS)
- Timeless - Ann Wolfe (ESPN2/Red Line Films)

=== Outstanding Open/Tease ===
- 2005 Little League World Series - U.S. Championship Tease (ABC)
- NFL on FOX: Super Bowl XXXIX - Game Open (FOX)
- Winter Gravity Games - Tease Octagon (OLN)
- **2005 World Figure Skating Championships - Show 1 Tease (ESPN)**

=== Sports Lifetime Achievement Award ===
- **Bud Greenspan**

== Most wins ==
By network

- HBO – 7
- FOX – 5
- ESPN – 4
- ESPN2 – 4
- ABC – 3
- TNT – 2
- CBS – 1
- ESPN Classic – 1
- ESPN.com – 1
- NBC – 1
- USA – 1

By program

- Cinderella Man: The James J. Braddock Story – 2
- NASCAR on Fox – 2
- Real Sports with Bryant Gumbel – 2
- 2005 World Figure Skating Championships – 2

== Most nominations ==
By network

- ESPN – 26
- HBO – 17
- FOX – 16
- ABC – 14
- ESPN2 – 12
- CBS – 11
- TNT – 9
- NBC – 7
- ESPN Classic – 4
- ESPN.com – 3
- Fox Sports Net – 3
- Discovery Channel – 2
- NFL Network – 2
- Speed Channel – 2
- MLB.com – 1
- OLN – 1
- USA – 1

By program

- SportsCenter – 5
- Timeless – 5
- Real Sports with Bryant Gumbel – 4
- Monday Night Football – 3
- Cinderella Man: The James J. Braddock Story – 3
- ESPN Sunday Night Football – 3
- Chasing Lance: #7 – 2
- Inside the NFL – 2
- 2005 Little League World Series – 2
- Mantle – 2
- NASCAR on Fox – 2
- NBA on TNT Thursdays – 2
- NFL on FOX: Super Bowl XXXIX – 2
- Rhythm in the Rope – 2
- The Final Four – 2
- 2005 Tour de France – 2
- 2005 World Figure Skating Championships – 2
- You Write Better Than You Play: The Frank Deford Story – 2
