= Outstanding Studio Show =

Sports Emmy Award for sports studio shows

The Sports Emmy Award for Outstanding Studio Show was first awarded in 1988. One sports studio show, whether a pregame or a nightly news show, was honored each year. In 2001, the category was split into two subcategories — Outstanding Studio Show, Daily and Outstanding Studio Show, Weekly, thus awarding two shows annually.

== Outstanding Studio Show ==
- 1989: NFL GameDay (ESPN)
- 1990: The NFL Today (CBS)
- 1991: SportsCenter (ESPN)
- 1992: NFL GameDay (ESPN) / NFL Live (NBC)
- 1993: The NFL Today (CBS)
- 1994: The NFL Today (CBS)
- 1995: NFL GameDay (ESPN)
- 1996: NFL GameDay (ESPN) / Fox NFL Sunday (FOX)
- 1997: SportsCenter (ESPN)
- 1998: Fox NFL Sunday (FOX)
- 1999: Fox NFL Sunday (FOX)
- 2000: MLB on Fox: Pregame Show (FOX)
- 2001: Fox NFL Sunday (FOX)

== Outstanding Studio Show, Daily ==
- 2002: Inside the NBA (TNT/TBS)
- 2003: Baseball Tonight (ESPN)
- 2004: SportsCenter (ESPN)
- 2005: SportsCenter (ESPN)
  - Baseball Tonight (ESPN)
  - The Best Damn Sports Show Period (Fox Sports Net)
  - Inside the NBA playoff shows (TNT)
  - Outside the Lines Nightly (ESPN)
  - Pardon the Interruption (ESPN)
- 2006: Inside the NBA playoff shows (TNT)
  - Baseball Tonight (ESPN)
  - The Best Damn Sports Show Period (Fox Sports Net)
  - Pardon the Interruption (ESPN)
  - SportsCenter (ESPN)
- 2007: Inside the NBA playoff shows (TNT)
  - Baseball Tonight (ESPN)
  - Olympic Ice (USA)
  - Outside the Lines (ESPN)
  - Pardon the Interruption (ESPN)
- 2008: Inside the NBA playoff shows (TNT)
  - NASCAR Now (ESPN2)
  - Pardon the Interruption (ESPN)
  - SportsCenter (ESPN)
  - Wimbledon Tonight (NBC)
- 2009: Inside the NBA playoff shows (TNT)
  - Baseball Tonight (ESPN)
  - MLB Postseason Studio (TBS)
  - Outside the Lines First Report (ESPN)
  - Pardon the Interruption (ESPN)
- 2010: Pardon the Interruption (ESPN)
  - Inside the NBA playoff shows (TNT)
  - MLB Tonight (MLB Network)
  - Outside the Lines First Report (ESPN)
  - SportsCenter (ESPN)
- 2011: MLB Tonight (MLB Network)
  - Inside the NBA playoff shows (TNT)
  - MLB Postseason on TBS (TBS)
  - Pardon the Interruption (ESPN)
  - SportsCenter (ESPN)
- 2012: MLB Tonight (MLB Network)
  - Inside the NBA playoff shows (TNT)
  - NASCAR Now (ESPN2 )
  - Pardon the Interruption (ESPN)
  - SportsCenter (ESPN)
  - SportsNation (ESPN2)
- 2013: MLB Tonight (MLB Network)
  - Inside the NBA playoff shows (TNT)
  - NFL Live (ESPN2)
  - NFL Total Access (NFL Network)
  - Pardon the Interruption (ESPN)
- 2014: Inside the NBA playoff shows (TNT)
  - MLB Tonight (MLB Network)
  - Olbermann (ESPN2)
  - Pardon the Interruption (ESPN)
  - SportsCenter (ESPN)
- 2015: MLB Tonight (MLB Network)
  - Inside the NBA playoff shows (TNT)
  - NFL Live (ESPN2)
  - Pardon the Interruption (ESPN)
  - SportsCenter (ESPN)
- 2016: MLB Tonight (MLB Network)
  - Inside the NBA (TNT)
  - Major League Baseball on Fox pregame show (FOX/Fox Sports 1)
  - Road to the Final Four (TBS/TNT/truTV/CBS)
  - World Cup Tonight (Fox Sports 1)
- 2017: Pardon the Interruption (ESPN)
  - Good Morning Football (NFL Network)
  - MLB Tonight (MLB Network)
  - NFL Total Access (NFL Network)
  - The Rich Eisen Show (Audience)
- 2018: MLB Tonight (MLB Network)
  - NHL Live (NBC/NBCSN)
  - Pardon the Interruption (ESPN)
  - The Dan Patrick Show (Audience/NBCSN)
  - The Herd with Colin Cowherd (Fox Sports 1)
- 2019: Pardon the Interruption (ESPN)
  - MLB Tonight (MLB Network)
  - Outside the Lines (ESPN)
  - The Dan Patrick Show (Audience/NBCSN)
  - The Jump (ESPN)
- 2020 MLB Tonight (MLB Network)
  - The Dan Patrick Show (B/R Live/DirecTV/NBCSN)
  - NHL Live (NBC/NBCSN)
  - Outside the Lines (ESPN)
  - Pardon the Interruption (ESPN)
- 2021:Sportscenter (ESPN)
  - The Dan Patrick Show (Peacock/DirecTV)
  - Good Morning Football (NFL Network)
  - MLB Tonight (MLB Network)
  - NFL Total Access (NFL Network)
  - Pardon the Interruption (ESPN)
- 2022:Good Morning Football (NFL Network)
  - The Dan Patrick Show (Peacock)
  - NASCAR Race Hub (FS1)
  - Pardon the Interruption (ESPN)
  - The Rich Eisen Show (Peacock)
  - Sportscenter (ESPN)

== Outstanding Studio Show, Weekly ==
- 2002: Sunday NFL Countdown (ESPN)
- 2003: Inside the NFL (HBO)
- 2004: Sunday NFL Countdown (ESPN)
- 2005: Inside the NFL (HBO)
  - Fox NFL Sunday (FOX)
  - MLB on Fox: Pregame Show (FOX)
  - NASCAR on Fox / FX: Prerace Show (FOX/FX)
  - Sunday NFL Countdown (ESPN)
- 2006: Inside the NFL (HBO)
  - College GameDay (ESPN)
  - Fox NFL Sunday (FOX)
  - Inside the NBA (TNT)
  - NASCAR on Fox Pre Race Show (FOX)
- 2007: Sunday NFL Countdown (ESPN)
  - College GameDay (ESPN)
  - Inside the NFL (HBO)
  - NBA Nation (ABC)
  - The NFL Today (CBS)
- 2008: College GameDay (ESPN)
  - Football Night in America (NBC)
  - Fox NFL Sunday (FOX)
  - Inside the NBA (TNT)
  - Inside the NFL (HBO)
- 2009: Inside the NFL (CBS/Showtime)
  - College GameDay (ESPN)
  - Football Night in America (NBC)
  - Fox NFL Sunday (FOX)
  - Monday Night Countdown (ESPN)
  - Sunday NFL Countdown (ESPN)
- 2010: College GameDay (ESPN)
  - Fox NFL Sunday (FOX)
  - Inside the NBA (TNT)
  - Inside the NFL (CBS/Showtime)
  - Studio 42 with Bob Costas (MLB Network)
- 2011: College GameDay (ESPN)
  - Football Night in America (NBC)
  - Inside the NBA (TNT)
  - NFL GameDay Morning (NFL Network)
  - Studio 42 with Bob Costas (MLB Network)
- 2012: Inside the NBA (TNT)
  - College GameDay (ESPN)
  - Football Night in America (NBC)
  - Inside the NFL (CBS/Showtime)
  - Sunday NFL Countdown (ESPN)
- 2013: Inside the NFL (Showtime)
  - College GameDay (ESPN)
  - Football Night in America (NBC)
  - Inside the NBA (TNT)
- 2014: College GameDay (ESPN) / Inside the NBA (TNT)
  - Fox NFL Sunday (FOX)
  - Monday Night Countdown (ESPN)
  - NFL GameDay Morning (NFL Network)
- 2015: College GameDay (ESPN)
  - Football Night in America (NBC)
  - Inside the NBA (TNT)
  - Sunday NFL Countdown (ESPN)
- 2016: College GameDay (ESPN)
  - Football Night in America (NBC)
  - Fox NFL Sunday (FOX)
  - Garbage Time with Katie Nolan (Fox Sports 1/foxsports.com)
  - Inside the NBA (TNT)
- 2017: College GameDay (ESPN)
  - Feherty (Golf Channel)
  - Football Night in America (NBC)
  - Inside the NBA (TNT)
  - Thursday Night Kickoff (CBS/NFL Network)
- 2018: College GameDay (ESPN)
  - Fox NFL Sunday (FOX)
  - Inside the NBA (TNT)
  - Monday Night Countdown (ESPN)
  - The NFL Today (CBS)
- 2019: Inside the NBA (TNT)
  - College GameDay (ESPN)
  - Football Night in America (NBC)
  - Fox NFL Sunday (FOX)
  - The NFL Today (CBS)
- 2020: Inside the NBA (TNT)
  - College GameDay (ESPN)
  - Football Night in America (NBC)
  - Fox NFL Sunday (FOX)
  - Fox NFL Thursday (FOX)
- 2021: Inside the NBA (TNT)
  - College GameDay (ESPN)
  - Football Night in America (NBC)
  - Fox NFL Sunday (FOX)
  - The NFL Today (CBS)
- 2022: Inside the NBA (TNT)
  - College GameDay (ESPN)
  - Fox NFL Sunday (FOX)
  - NFL Slimetime (Nickelodeon)
  - Outside the Lines (ESPN)

== Outstanding Studio Show, Limited Run ==
- 2016: Major League Baseball on Fox (2016 Playoffs) (FOX/Fox Sports 1/foxsports.com)
  - Golf Central (2016 Players' Championship) (Golf Channel)
  - Inside the NBA (2016 Playoffs) (TNT)
  - Major League Baseball on TBS (2016 Playoffs) (TBS)
  - Road to the Final Four (CBS/TBS/TNT/truTV)
- 2017: Major League Baseball on Fox (2017 Playoffs) (FOX/Fox Sports 1)
  - Gruden's QB Camp (ESPN/ESPN2)
  - Inside the NBA (2017 Playoffs) (TNT)
  - NHL Live (2017 Stanley Cup playoffs) (NBC/NBCSN/USA Network)
  - Road to the Final Four (CBS/TBS/TNT/truTV)
- 2018: Inside the NBA (2018 Playoffs) (TNT)
  - Major League Baseball on Fox (2018 Playoffs) (FOX/Fox Sports 1)
  - MLB Now (2018 Playoffs) (MLB Network)
  - NFL Countdown (playoffs) (ESPN)
  - Road to the Final Four (CBS/TBS/TNT/truTV)
  - US Open preview (ESPN)

== Multiple wins ==
10 wins

- Inside the NBA

8 wins

- College GameDay

7 wins

- NFL GameDay/Sunday NFL Countdown

6 wins

- MLB Tonight

5 wins

- Inside the NFL

4 wins

- Fox NFL Sunday
- SportsCenter

3 wins

- Major League Baseball on Fox
- The NFL Today
- Pardon the Interruption

== Multiple nominations ==
27 nominations

- Inside the NBA

14 nominations

- College GameDay
- Pardon the Interruption

13 nominations

- Fox NFL Sunday

11 nominations

- NFL GameDay/Sunday NFL Countdown
- SportsCenter

10 nominations

- MLB Tonight

9 nominations

- Football Night in America
- Inside the NFL

6 nominations

- Major League Baseball on Fox
- The NFL Today

5 nominations

- Baseball Tonight
- Outside the Lines/Outside the Lines First Report/Outside the Lines Nightly
- The Dan Patrick Show

4 nominations

- Road to the Final Four

3 nominations

- MLB Postseason on TBS/MLB Postseason Studio
- Monday Night Countdown

2 nominations

- The Best Damn Sports Show Period
- NASCAR Now
- NASCAR on Fox Pre Race Show
- NFL GameDay Morning
- NFL Live
- NFL Total Access
- NHL Live
- Studio 42 with Bob Costas
