= 35th Sports Emmy Awards =

- Date: May 6, 2014
- Location: Frederick P. Rose Hall, Jazz at Lincoln Center, New York City

Television/radio coverage
- Directed by: Steve Ulrich (Executive Director); Steve Head (Assoc. Director)

The 35th Sports Emmy Awards was presented on May 6, 2014, at the Frederick P. Rose Hall at the Jazz at Lincoln Center in New York City. Ted Turner, entrepreneur, sportsman and television visionary, was honored with the Lifetime Achievement Award for Sports.

== Awards ==
=== Programs ===
Outstanding Live Sports Special	Outstanding Live Sports Series
The 109th World Series, FOX; 2013 NBA Finals, ABC/ESPN; 2013 Wimbledon Championships, ABC/ESPN; The 55th Daytona 500, FOX; Red Sox vs. Cardinals; 34th America's Cup, NBCSN	Sunday Night Football, NBC; ESPN College Football, ABC/ESPN; ESPN Monday Night Football, ESPN; HBO Boxing, HBO; SEC on CBS, CBS
Outstanding Edited Sports Event Coverage	Outstanding Playoff Coverage
All Access, Showtime, Episode: Mayweather vs. Canelo Epilogue; 2013 Ironman World Championship, NBC; Keep Climbing: The 2013 Elite 11, ESPNU; NFL Turning Point, NBCSN; Super Bowl XLVII, NFL Network	American League Championship Series, FOX, Red Sox vs. Tigers; MLB Postseason on tbs, tbs; NBA Playoffs on TNT, TNT; NFC Championships, FOX, Falcons vs. 49ers; NFC Wild Card, FOX, Seahawks vs. Redskins
Outstanding Sports Documentary	Outstanding Sports Documentary Series
The Doctor, NBA TV; First: The Official Film of the London Olympic Games, NBC; LT: The Life and Times, Showtime; UFC Presents Ronda Rousey: Breaking Ground, FS1	30 for 30, ESPN [ESPN Films]; 24/7 – Red Wings - Maple Leafs: Road to the Winter Classic, HBO; A Football Life, NFL Network; Casualties of the Gridion, Conde Nast Entertainment; The Journey – Big Ten Basketball 2013, Big Ten Network; MLS Insider, NBCSN; Nine for XI, ESPN
Outstanding Studio Show - Weekly	Outstanding Studio Show - Daily
College GameDay - Football, ESPN; Inside the NBA on TNT, TNT; FOX NFL Sunday, FOX; Monday Night Countdown, ESPN; NFL GameDay Morning, NFL Network	Inside the NBA on TNT: Playoffs, TNT; MLB Tonight, MLB Network; Olbermann; Pardon the Interruption, ESPN; SportsCenter, ESPN
Outstanding Edited Sports Series/Anthology	Outstanding Sports Journalism
Real Sports with Bryant Gumbel, HBO; 60 Minutes Sports, Showtime; E:60, ESPN2; NFL Films Presents, NFL Films	E:60 - Children of the Ring, ESPN2; 60 Minutes Sports - The Fall of Lance Armstrong, Showtime; In Play with Jimmy Roberts - Valentino Dixon, Golf Channel; Real Sports with Bryant Gumbel - Putin's Olympics: Cronyism and Corruption in Russia, HBO
Outstanding Short Feature	Outstanding Long Feature
SportsCenter - Richie Parker: Drive, ESPN; E:60 - Shear Will, ESPN2; Ironman World Championship - Peace, Love, Grace, NBC; Sunday NFL Countdown - O.J. Brigance: Heart of the Ravens, ESPN; The Super Bowl Today - Chuck Pagano: A Season of Family, CBS	60 Minutes Sports - Great Falls, Showtime; 30 for 30 Shorts - The Irrelevant Giant, Grantland.com; 30 for 40 Shorts - Cutthroat, Grantland.com; SportsCenter - The Lady Jags: Losing to Win, ESPN; SportsCenter - Carry On, ESPN
Outstanding Open/Tease	Outstanding New Approaches - Sports Event Coverage
Super Bowl XLVII - We Will Rock You Remix, CBS; 2013 Open Championship - Fish on Tartan, ESPN; 24/7 - Red Wings - Maple Leafs: Road to the Winter Classic, HBO; MLB Network Divisional Playoffs - A Field of Dreamers, MLB Network	The 34th America's Cup - Official App, America's Cup Event Authority; 2013 NCAA March Madness Live, NCAA; NFL Sunday Ticket Experience on DirecTV, DirecTV; The PGA Tour Experience on DirecTV, DirecTV
Outstanding New Approaches - Sports Programming	Outstanding New Approaches - Sports Programming Short Format
Sports Illustrated - A Boy Helps a Town Heal, SI.com; Behind the Mask, Hulu; FOX Sports Live - Social Highlight, FS1; Nine for IX - Coach, espnw.com; Together We Make Football - The Contest, NFL Films; Underdogs, SI.com	JFK: The Untold NFL History of That Day in Dallas, NFL.com, [NFL Digital Media]; NFL UP!, NFL.com, [NFL Ditigal Media]; Collegeinsider.com All-Access - Anatomy of a Game Winner - The 2013 CIT Final, collegeinsider.com; NFL Films Drawn - Between Takes with Wynton Marsalis, NFL.com; Numbers Never Lie Whiteboard - LeBron James can Surpass Michael Jordan, ESPN2
Outstanding Sports Promotional Announcement - Institutional	Outstanding Sports Promotional Announcement - Episodic
NFL Draft - Leon Sandcastle, NFL Network; Formula 1 - Rockstar/Shaken and Stirred vs. Drivers/Austin, NBC/NBCSN; HBO Boxing - Fall Boxing Image, HBO; MLB Network Prime Time Line Up - Here's to Us, MLB Network; NBA Playoffs - will.i.am Playoff Promo, ESPN; NFL draft - Leon Sandcastle, NFL Network	NHL on NBCSN - Wednesday Night Rivalry, NBCSN; 24/7 – Red Wings - Maple Leafs: Road to the Winter Classic, HBO; A Football Life - Life Story, NFL Network; NASCAR on FOX - NASCAR DOG FIGHT, FOX/FOX SOCCER/FUEL
Outstanding Live Sports Coverage in Spanish	Outstanding Studio Show in Spanish
Rumbo Al Mundial - Costa Rica vs. Mexico, Telemundo; Futebol Estelar - La Gran Finale: Leon vs. America, Telemundo; Futebol Estelar - Super Clasico: Guadalajara vs. America, Telemundo; Liga MX Clausura 2013 season – Final - 2nd Leg America vs. Cruz Azul, UNIVISION	Nacion, ESPN Deportes; SportsCenter, ESPN Deportes; Futbol Picante, ESPN Deportes; Lakers en Vivo, Time Warner Cable Deportes; Titulares Telemundo, Telemundo

=== Technical ===
Outstanding Technical Team Remote	Outstanding Technical Team Studio
NASCAR on FOX, FOX; ESPN Monday Night Football, ESPN; Golf Channel on NBC, NBC/Golf Channel; MLB on FOX, FOX; The 34th America's Cup, NBCSN	MLB Tonight, MLB Network; College GameDay, ESPN; Road to the Final Four, CBS/TNT/tbs/TruTV; The Premier League, NBCSN
Outstanding Camera Work	Outstanding Editing
24/7 – Red Wings - Maple Leafs: Road to the Winter Classic, HBO; E:60 - Children of the Ring, ESPN2; FOX Sports Live - West, TX, FS1; NFL Films Presents, NFL Network; 2013 Tour de France, NBCSN	Hard Knocks - Training Camp with the Cincinnati Bengals, HBO; 2013 PGA Tour - Teases, Golf Channel; 24/7 - Pacqiau-Rios, HBO; Legendary Nights - The Tale of Gatti-Ward, HBO; NBA on TNT - Teases, TNT
The Dick Schaap Outstanding Writing Award	Outstanding Music Composition/Direction/Lyrics
NFL Films Presents - Yours Truly, Dr. Z, NFL Network, [NFL Films]; 24/7 – Red Wings - Maple Leafs: Road to the Winter Classic, HBO; E:60 - The Ballad of Bushwacker, ESPN2; ESPN Grand Slam Tennis - Wimbledon & US Open, ABC/ESPN; Football Night in America - Redskins Name Commentary, NBC	Hard Knocks - Training Camp with the Cincinnati Bengals, HBO, [NFL Films]; Against the Tide, Showtime; College Football on CBS - The Army-Navy Game, CBS; Nine for IX - The Diplomat, ESPN; Road to the Super Bowl, NFL Network
Outstanding Live Event Audio/Sound	Outstanding Post-Produced Audio/Sound
MLB on FOX, FOX; NASCAR on ESPN, ABC/ESPN; NASCAR on FOX, FOX; The 34th America's Cup, NBCSN	Hard Knocks - Training Camp with the Cincinnati Bengals, HBO [NFL Films]; 24/7 – Red Wings vs. Maple Leafs: Road to the Winter Classic, HBO; ESPN Sport Science, ESPN; Sound FX, NFL Films; Super Bowl XLVII, NFL Films
Outstanding Live Event Graphic Design	Outstanding Post-Produced Graphic Design
X Games, ESPN; ESPN Monday Night Football, ESPN; Intentional Talk, MLB Network; NBA on TNT, TNT; NBA on TNT - All-Star Weekend, TNT	MLB Tonight, MLB Network; 2013 Heisman Trophy Presentation, ESPN; E:60, ESPN2; ESPN Sport Science, ESPN; The NFL Today, CBS
Outstanding Studio Design/Art Direction	Outstanding Production Design/Art Direction
NBA Playoffs on TNT, TNT; MLB Postseason on tbs, tbs; Super Bowl XLVII, SBC/SBC Sports Network	Sunday Night Football - Waiting All Day for Sunday Night Opening, NBC; NASCAR on FOX - Hangar Shoot, FOX; NFL draft, ESPN; The Division Series On MLB Network - A Field on Network, MLB Network
The George Wensel Technical Achievement Award	
The Premier League - Goal-line technology, NBCSN; NASCAR on FOX and SPEED, FOX/SPEED; NASCAR - Gyrocam, NASCAR; Pac-12 Networks, PAC-12 Network; Multicam, MI/O; The 34th America's Cup – AC LOVELINE - "WINGWASH", MLB Network	

=== Personalities ===
Outstanding Sports Personality - Studio Host	Outstanding Sports Personality - Play-by-Play
Bob Costas, NBC/MLB Network; James Brown; Dave Faherty, Golf Channel; Greg Gumbel, CBS; Dan Patrick, NBC/NBCSN/DirecTV	Mike Emrick, NBC/NBCSN; Marv Albert, TNT/tbs/TruTV/CBS; Mike Breen, ABC/ESPN; Joe Buck, FOX; Bob Costas, NBC/NBCSN
Outstanding Sports Personality - Studio Analyst	Outstanding Sports Personality - Sports Event Analyst
Harold Reynolds, MLB Network/FOX; Tom Verducci, tbs/MLB Network; Cris Collinsworth, Showtime; Al Leiter, MLB Network; Rick Neuheisel PAC-12 Network; Michael Strahan, FOX	Cris Collinsworth, NBC; Gary Danielson, CBS; Kirk Herbstreit, ESPN; Tim McCarver, FOX
Outstanding Sports Personality - Sports Reporter	Outstanding On-Air Sports Personality in Spanish
Michele Tafoya, NBC; Pierre McGuire, NBC/NBCSN; Ken Rosenthal, FOX; Lisa Salters, ESPN; Tom Verducci, MLB Network	Andres Cantor, Telemundo; Lindsay Casinelli, Univision; Jose Ramon Fernandez, ESPN Deportes; Ivan Kasanzew, Univision; Sammy Sadovnik, Telemundo

=== Lifetime Achievement Award ===
- Ted Turner

== Awards by Network Group ==
Group	Award-Winning Networks	Winners
NBC Sports Group	NBC, NBC Sports Network, Telemundo	11
ESPN	ESPN, ESPN2, ESPN Deportes	7
Turner Sports	TNT, TBS, NBA TV	5
HBO Sports	HBO	5
MLB Network		5
Fox Sports	FOX	5
NFL Network		4
CBS Sports	Showtime, CBS Sports Network	3
America's Cup Event Authority		1
SI.com		1
