= Outstanding Sports Personality, Studio and Sports Event Analyst =

The Sports Emmy Awards for Outstanding Sports Personality, Studio Analyst and Outstanding Sports Personality, Sports Event Analyst. Before 1993, an Emmy was awarded in just one combined category. That list of winners will also be featured here.

== Outstanding Analyst ==
- 1981: Dick Button (ABC)
- 1982: John Madden (CBS)
- 1983: John Madden (2) (CBS)
- 1984: no award was given
- 1985: no award was given
- 1986: no award was given
- 1987: John Madden (3) (CBS)
- 1988: John Madden (4) (CBS)
- 1989: John Madden (5) (CBS)
- 1990: John Madden (6) (CBS)
- 1991: John Madden (7) (CBS)
- 1992: John Madden (8) (CBS)

== Sports Event Analyst ==
- 1993: Billy Packer (CBS)
- 1994: John Madden (FOX)
- 1995: John Madden (2) (FOX)
- 1997: Joe Morgan (ESPN)
- 1998: John Madden (3)(FOX)
- 1999: John Madden (4) (FOX)
- 2000: Tim McCarver (FOX)
- 2001: Tim McCarver (2) (FOX)
- 2002: Tim McCarver (3) (FOX)
- 2003: John Madden (5) (ABC)
- 2004: Joe Morgan (2) (ESPN)
- 2005: John Madden (6) (ABC)
- 2006: Cris Collinsworth (NFL Network)
- 2007: John Madden (7) (NBC)
- 2008: Cris Collinsworth (2) (NFL Network/NBC)
- 2009: Cris Collinsworth (3) (NBC)
- 2010: Cris Collinsworth (4) (NBC)
- 2011: Cris Collinsworth (5) (NBC)
- 2012: Cris Collinsworth (6) (NBC)
- 2013: Cris Collinsworth (7) (NBC)
- 2014: Cris Collinsworth (8) (NBC)
- 2015: Bill Raftery (CBS/Fox Sports 1/TBS/TNT/truTV)
- 2016: Bill Raftery (2) (CBS/Fox Sports 1/TBS/TNT/truTV)
- 2017: Kirk Herbstreit (ESPN/ABC)
- 2018: Bill Raftery (3) (CBS/Fox Sports 1/TBS/TNT/truTV)
- 2019: Bill Raftery (4) (CBS/Fox Sports 1/TBS/TNT/truTV)
- 2020: Kirk Herbstreit (2) (ESPN/ABC)
- 2021: John Smoltz (FOX/FS1)
- 2022: Cris Collinsworth (9) (NBC)
- 2023: Peyton Manning (ESPN2)
- 2024: Greg Olsen (FOX)
- 2025: Peyton Manning (2) (ESPN2)

== Studio Analyst ==
- 1996: Howie Long (FOX)
- 1997: Cris Collinsworth (HBO/NBC)
- 1998: Cris Collinsworth (2) (HBO/FOX)
- 1999: Terry Bradshaw (FOX)
- 2000: Steve Lyons (FOX)
- 2001: Terry Bradshaw (2) (FOX)
- 2002: Cris Collinsworth (3) (HBO)
- 2003: Cris Collinsworth (4) (HBO)
- 2004: Cris Collinsworth (5) (HBO)
- 2005: Cris Collinsworth (6) (HBO)
- 2006: Cris Collinsworth (7) (HBO/NBC)
- 2007: Cris Collinsworth (8) (HBO/NBC)
- 2008: Terry Bradshaw (3) (FOX) / Tom Jackson (ESPN)
- 2009: Kirk Herbstreit (ESPN)
- 2010: Kirk Herbstreit (2) (ESPN)
- 2011: Charles Barkley (CBS/NBA TV/TNT)
- 2012: Charles Barkley (2) (NBA TV/TNT)
- 2013: Harold Reynolds (MLB Network/FOX) / Tom Verducci (TBS/MLB Network)
- 2014: Harold Reynolds (2) (MLB Network)
- 2015: Bill Ripken (MLB Network)
- 2016: Charles Barkley (3) (CBS/TBS/TNT/truTV)
- 2017: Harold Reynolds (3) (MLB Network)
- 2018: Harold Reynolds (4) (MLB Network)
- 2019: Kirk Herbstreit (3) (ESPN)
- 2020: Charles Barkley (4) (CBS/TBS/TNT/truTV)
- 2021: Nate Burleson (CBS/CBSSN/NFLN)
- 2022: Nate Burleson (2) (CBS/Nickelodeon)
- 2023: Ryan Clark (ABC/ESPN/ESPN2)
- 2024: Charles Barkley (5) (CBS/TBS/TNT/truTV)
- 2025: Charles Barkley (6) (CBS/TBS/TNT/truTV)
