= 34th Sports Emmy Awards =

- Date: May 7, 2013
- Location: Frederick P. Rose Hall, Jazz at Lincoln Center, New York City

The 34th Sports Emmy Awards were presented on May 7, 2013 at the Frederick P. Rose Hall at the Jazz at Lincoln Center in New York City.

== Awards ==
=== Programs ===
Outstanding Live Sports Special	Outstanding Live Sports Series
Super Bowl XLVI, NBC; 96th Indianapolis 500, ABC; 108th World Series, FOX; The Army-Navy Game, CBS; 2012 Masters Tournament, CBS	NBC Sunday Night Football, NBC; ESPN Monday Night Football, ESPN; NASCAR of FOX, FOX/SPEED; NBA on TNT, TNT; NFL on FOX, FOX
Outstanding Live Event Turnaround	Outstanding Playoff Coverage
Games of the XXX Olympiad, NBC; Down the Stretch - The Honda Classic, Golf Channel; Inside the Headsets - 2012 NASCAR Sprint All-Star Race, SPEED; Monster Energy SuperCross - Salt Lake City, CBS; USA Pro Challenge - The Race of Truth, NBC	2012 National League Championship Series - Cardinals vs. Giants, FOX; NBA Playoffs, TNT; NFC Divisional Playoffs - 49ers vs. Saints, FOX; NFL Wild Card Sunday - Bengals vs. Texans; Lions vs. Saints, NBC; The NCAA men's basketball tournament, CBS/tbs/TNT/truTV
Outstanding Edited Sports Special	Outstanding Sports Documentary
One Heartbeat, CBS Sports Network; Michael Waltrip Racing All Access - Inside Michael Waltrip Racing: A Championship Quest, SPEED; Outside the Lines - Believe, ESPN; Still Standing: The Earl Campbell Story, NBC Sports Network; Tecmo Super Bowl, NFL Network	Namath, HBO; 26 Years: The Dewey Bozella Story, ESPN2; Dream Team, NBA TV; Klitischko, HBO; The Announcement, ESPN
Outstanding Edited Sports Series/Anthology	Outstanding Studio Show - Weekly
Real Sports with Bryant Gumbel, HBO; 30 for 30, ESPN; A Football Life, NFL Network; Hard Knocks: Training Camp with the Miami Dolphins, HBO; The Franchise: A Season with the Miami Marlins, Showtime	Inside the NFL, Showtime; College GameDay, ESPN; Football Night in America, NBC; Inside the NBA, TNT
Outstanding Studio Show - Daily	Outstanding Sports Journalism
MLB Tonight, MLB Network; Inside the NBA, TNT; NFL Live, ESPN2; NFL Total Access, NFL Network; Pardon the Interruption, ESPN	E:60 - Beitar Jerusalem, ESPN2; E:60 - Busted Coverage, ESPN2; Real Sports with Bryant Gumbel - Hockey's Darkest Day, HBO; Real Sports with Bryant Gumbel - Your Brain on Football, HBO
Outstanding Short Feature	Outstanding Long Feature
NFL Gameday Morning - Immaculate Remembrance, NFL Network; College GameDay - Fist Bump: A Brotherly Bond, ESPN; E:60 - Perfect, ESPN2; Inside the NFL - One Last Wish: The Danny Webber Story, Showtime; MLB on FOX - Negro Leagues, FOX; NFL Films Presents - Slackliner, NFL Network; NFL GameDay Morning - Immaculate Remembrance, NFL Network; SportsCenter - Kick of Hope, ESPN; SportsCenter - Run With Me, ESPN	Real Sports with Bryant Gumbel - Steve Gleason: Tragic Hero, HBO; E:60 - Mike Powell: In Relentless Pursuit, ESPN2; Games of the XXX Olympiad - Olga Korbut, NBC; Real Sports with Bryant Gumbel - Chancellor Lee Adams: The Fighter, HBO; Real Sports with Bryant Gumbel - Two of a Kind, HBO
Outstanding Open/Tease	Outstanding New Approaches Sports Event Coverage
NBA on TNT - All-Star Game Tease, TNT; Games of the XXX Olympiad - Measure & Motion, NBC; MLB Network Division Series - The Scrapbook, MLB Network; NBA on TNT - Brooklyn Nets/New York Knicks Spike Lee Tease, TNT; NCAA March Madness - Brakets Everywhere, truTV; Red Bull Signature Series - Show Open, NBC; Sunday Night Football - Opening Tease, NBC	Red Bull Stratos: Space Jump, YouTube; Games of the XXX Olympiad - Live From London, NBCOlympics.com; March Madness Live - NFL RedZone, NCAA.com; Super Bowl XLVI Extra, NBCSports.com
Outstanding New Approaches Sports Programming	Outstanding New Approaches Sports Programming Short Format
Games of the XXX Olympiad - Countdown to London, NBCOlympics.com; ESPNU Unite, ESPNU; Everything to Prove, NFL.com; Royce White Battles Anxiety on Draft Day, grantland.com; The Arnold Palmer, grantland.com; The NFL Season: A Biography, NFL Media	Sports Science, ESPN; ESPNU Social Highlight, ESPNU; Story Time with Jalen Rose - Jalen Rose Steals Patrick Ewing's TV, grantland.com; Numbers Never Lie Whiteboard, ESPN2; Speaking Out, NFL Media

=== Personalities ===
Outstanding Sports Personality - Studio Host	Outstanding Sports Personality - Play-by-Play
Bob Costas, NBC Sports/NBC Sports Network; James Brown, CBS/Showtime; Rich Eisen, NFL Network; Ernie Johnson Jr., TNT/NBA TV; Dan Patrick, NBC/NBC Sports Network	Al Michaels, NBC Sports; Mike Breen, ABC; Mike Emrick, NBC/NBC Sports Network; Jim Nantz, CBS
Outstanding Sports Personality - Studio Analyst	Outstanding Sports Personality - Sports Event Analyst
Charles Barkley, TNT; Tony Dungy, NBC; Boomer Esiason, CBS; Harold Reynolds, MLB Network; Billy Ripken, MLB Network; Kurt Warner, NFL Network	Cris Collinsworth, NBC; Ato Boldon, NBC; Jon Gruden, ESPN; Jim Kaat, MLB Network; Mike Mayock, NFL Network/NBC
Outstanding Sports Personality - Sports Reporter	
Pierre McGuire, NBC Sports/NBC Sports Network; Tom Verducci, MLB Network/TBS; Andrea Joyce, NBC/MNC Sports Network; Lisa Salters, ESPN; Michele Tafoya, NBC	

=== Technical ===
Outstanding Technical Team Remote	Outstanding Technical Team Studio
Winter X Games XVI, ESPN3D; America's Cup World Series, NBC; Games of the XXX Olympiad, NBC; MLB on Fox, FOX; 2012 Masters tournament, ESPN3D/CBS	Games of the XXX Olympiad, NBC/Bravo/MSNBC/NBC Sports Network/Telemundo; MLB Tonight, MLB Network; UEFA Euro 2012, ESPN
Outstanding Camera Work	Outstanding Editing
Outside the Lines - Breaking the Silence, ESPN; 24/7 - Pacquiao-Marques 4, HBO; E:60 - Remember Bluffton, ESPN2; Games of the XXX Olympiad - Measure & Motion, NBC; 2012 Ironman World Championship, NBC; NFL Films Presents, NFL Network	24/7 - Pacquiao/Marques 4, HBO; Being: Liverpool, FOX/FOX Soccer Channel; Games of the XXX Olympiad - Profiles of the London Games, NBC; Grand Slam Tennis - Australian Open, Wimbledon, & US Open, ESPN2; Hard Knocks - Training Camp with the Miami Dolphins, HBO; NBA on TNT, TNT; Outside the Lines - Breaking the Silence, ESPN
The Dick Schaap Writing Award	Outstanding Music Composition/Direction/Lyrics
Games of the XXX Olympiad - Measure & Motion, NBC; 24/7 - Pacquiao-Marques 4, HBO; 30 for 30 - Ghosts of Ole Miss, ESPN; NFL Films Presents - Like a Rose, NFL Network; Open Championship - Old, ESPN	Namath, HBO; Hard Knocks - Training Camp with the Miami Dolphins, HBO; Road to the Super Bowl, NFL Network
Outstanding Live Event Audio/Sound	Outstanding Post Produced Audio/Sound
NASCAR on FOX, FOX; MLB Spring Training Game - Indians vs. Diamondbacks All Audio, MLB Network; MLB on FOX, FOX	Hard Knocks - Training Camp with the Miami Dolphins, HBO; 24/7 - Pacquiao-Marques 4, HBO; Games of the XXX Olympiad - Measure & Motion, NBC; NBA on TNT, TNT
Outstanding Graphic Design	Outstanding Production Design/Art Direction
MLB Network Division Series - The Scrapbook, MLB Network; Games of the XXX Olympiad, NBC/NBC Sports Network; Sport Science, ESPN/ESPN2/ESPNews; NBC Sunday Night Football, NBC; UEFA Euro 2012, ESPN	NCAA March Madness - Brackets Everywhere, truTV; MLB Postseason on tbs, tbs; Outside the Lines - Defiance: The Story of FC Start, ESPN; NBC Sunday Night Football - Open, NBC
The George Wensel Technical Achievement Award	Outstanding Sports Promotional Announcement - Institutional
Games of the XXX Olympiad - The Multi-Screen Olympics, NBC/Bravo/CNBC/MSNBC/NBC Sports Network/NBCOlympics.com/Telemundo; Games of the XXX Olympiad & NBC Golf Tour - 360 Cam, NBC; MLB on Fox - Phantom Camera, FOX; NASCAR on Fox - 3D Cutaway Car, FOX; NFL on Fox - Super Zoom, FOX	It's Not Crazy, It's Sports - Shake on It, The Name, Born Into It, ESPN; NCAA March Madness - Brackets Everywhere, tbs/CBS/TNT/truTV; MLB Postseason on tbs - Bruce Springsteen - Land of Dreams, tbs; NBA on TNT: John Turturro 'Claude X: Street Artist' - Intro, Prolific, Struggle; Nothing Beats First Place - Worse, Painful, Scary, ESPN; The Voice of Golf - Confessions, Navigation, Costumes, CBS
Outstanding Sports Promotional Announcement - Episodic	
A Football Life - Life Story, NFL Network; Feherty Live from the Ryder Cup - Pro America, Pro Europe, Split Decision, Golf Channel; Games of the XXX Olympiad - Britain Just Got Great, NBC; The Dream Team - Trailer, NBA TV; The Triple Crown - Trailer, NBC	

== Awards by Network Group ==
Group	Award-Winning Networks	Winners
NBC Sports Group	NBC, NBC Sports Network, nbcolympics.com, Bravo, CNBC, MSNBC, Telemundo	23
Turner Sports	TNT, TBS, NBA TV	7
HBO Sports	HBO	6
ESPN	ESPN, ESPN2, ESPN 3D	5
MLB Network		3
CBS Sports	Showtime, CBS Sports Network	2
Fox Sports	FOX	2
NFL Network		2
YouTube		1
