= 32nd Sports Emmy Awards =

- Date: May 2, 2011
- Location: Frederick P. Rose Hall, Jazz at Lincoln Center, New York City

The 32nd Sports Emmy Awards were presented on May 2, 2011 at the Frederick P. Rose Hall at the Jazz at Lincoln Center in New York City.

== Awards ==
=== Programs ===
Outstanding Live Sports Special	Outstanding Live Sports Series
2010 FIFA World Cup Final - Spain vs. Netherlands, ABC; 2010 Tour de France, Versus; Golf on CBS - The Masters, CBS; NBA Finals on ABC, ABC; 2010 Breeders' Cup, ESPN; The Ryder Cup, NBC/USA	NBC Sunday Night Football, NBC; ESPN College Football, ESPN; ESPN Monday Night Football, ESPN; NASCAR on FOX and SPEED, FOX/SPEED; NFL on FOX, FOX
Outstanding Live Event Turnaround	Outstanding Playoff Coverage
Sound FX - Cincinnati Bengals at New York Jets, NFL Network/NFL Films; Inside the Headsets - The 26th All-Star Challenge, SPEED; The 2010 World Series of Poker Final Table, ESPN; Tour de France on CBS, CBS; XXI Olympic Winter Games, NBC	NCAA Basketball on CBS - The NCAA men's basketball tournament, CBS; 2010 FIFA World Cup, ESPN; MLB Postseason on TBS, TBS; NBA Playoffs on TNT, TNT; NFL on FOX - NFC Championship Game, FOX
Outstanding Edited Sports Special	Outstanding Sports Documentary
24/7 - Penguins-Capitals: Road to the NHL Winter Classic, HBO; 24/7 - Mayweather-Mosley, HBO; Bill Parcells: Reflections on a Life in Football, NFL Network; I Scored a Goal, ABC; Red Bull Young Jaws, Fuel/Red Bull Media House	Lombardi HBO; June 17, 1994, ESPN; Magic & Bird: A Courtship of Rivals, HBO; Robben Island: A Greater Goal, ESPN2; The Two Escobars, ESPN Deportes
Outstanding Edited Sports Series/Anthology	Outstanding Studio Show - Weekly
Hard Knocks - Training Camp with the New York Jets, HBO; Big Ten Basketball 2010 - The Journey, Big Ten Network; E:60, ESPN2; NCAA on CBS - Championships of the NCAA, CBS; Real Sports with Bryant Gumbel, HBO	ESPN College Gameday, ESPN; Football Night in America, NBC; Inside the NBA on TNT, TNT; MLB Network's Studio 42 with Bob Costas, MLB Network; NFL Gameday Morning, NFL Network
Outstanding Studio Show - Daily	Outstanding Sports Journalism
MLB Tonight, MLB Network; Inside the NBA on TNT, TNT; MLB Postseason on TBS, TBS; Pardon the Interruption, ESPN; SportsCenter, ESPN	Real Sports with Bryant Gumbel - The Missing Link, HBO; E:60 - Children of Bhopal, ESPN2; Real Sports with Bryant Gumbel - Fallen Star, HBO; Vanguard - Soccer's Lost Boys, Current TV
Outstanding Short Feature	Outstanding Long Feature
NFL on CBS - Super Bowl XLIV - Wynton Marsalis - '43 Years', CBS; E:60 - A League of Her Own, ABC; Inside the NFL - The Drew Swank Story, Showtime; NFL on CBS - Honoring Flight 93, CBS; Outside the Lines - Santa Anita: A Dark History, ESPN	E:60 - Survival 1, ESPN2; E:60 - Josiah's Time, ESPN2; E:60 - Unbreakable, ESPN2; Outside the Lines - Asian Carp, ESPN; Outside the Lines - The Power of Dylan, ESPN; Real Sports with Bryant Gumbel - Leading Man, HBO
Outstanding Open/Tease	Outstanding New Approaches Sports Event Coverage
XXI Olympic Winter Games - Discovery, NBC; 2010 FIFA World Cup, ABC; 2010 NBA Draft, ESPN; Lombardi, HBO; NBA Playoffs on TNT - Jamie vs. Justin, TNT	NFL Sunday Ticket Experience on DIRECTV, DIRECTV; CBS NCAA March Madness On Demand IPhone App, CBS Interactive; MLB.com At Bat 2010, MLBAM; NFL.com Live: 2010 Scouting Combine, NFL.com; XXI Olympic Winter Games - Beyond the Broadcast, NBCOlympics.com
Outstanding New Approaches Sports Programming	Outstanding New Approaches Sports Programming Short Format
The Science of Sports, NBCSports.com; 24/7 - Mayweather-Mosley Face Off with max Kellerman, HBO; Sunday Night Football Extra, NBCSports.com	XXI Olympic Winter Games, NBCOlympics.com; Sport Science, ESPN.com; The NFL Season: A Biography, NFL.com/NFL Network

=== Personalities ===
Outstanding Sports Personality, Studio Host	Outstanding Sports Personality, Play-by-Play
Bob Costas, NBC/MLB Network; Chris Berman, ESPN; James Brown, CBS/Showtime; Ernie Johnson, TNT; Dan Patrick, NBC/DirecTV; Scott Van Pelt, ESPN	Mike Emrick, NBC; Joe Buck, FOX; Bob Costas, MLB Network; Verne Lundquist, CBS; Al Michaels, NBC; Jim Nantz, CBS
Outstanding Sports Personality, Studio Analyst	Outstanding Sports Personality, Sports Event Analyst
Kirk Herbstreit, ESPN; Charles Barkley, TNT; Tom Jackson, ESPN; Howie Long, FOX; Harold Reynolds, MLB Network	Cris Collinsworth, NBC; Jon Gruden, ESPN; Orel Hershiser, ESPN; Phil Simms, CBS; Jeff Van Gundy, ABC

=== Technical ===
Outstanding Technical Team Remote	Outstanding Technical Team Studio
Golf on CBS, CBS; NASCAR on FOX, FOX; NFL on CBS - Super Bowl XLIV, CBS; Winter X Games XIV, ESPN/ESPN2	XXI Olympic Winter Games, NBC; 2010 FIFA World Cup, ESPN/ABC; MLB Tonight, MLB Network
Outstanding Camera Work	Outstanding Editing
Hard Knocks - Training Camp with the New York Jets, HBO/NFL Films; 2010 FIFA World Cup, ESPN/ABC; 24/7 - Jimmie Johnson: Race to Daytona, HBO; First Ascent, Travel Channel/Sender Films; NFL Films Presents - Shots of the Year, NFL Network/NFL Films; XXI Olympic Winter Games - Discovery, NBC	24/7 - Jimmie Johnson: Race to Daytona, HBO; 2010 Scripps National Spelling Bee, ABC; Hard Knocks - Training Camp with the New York Jets, HBO/NFL Films; Inside the NFL - Sounds of the Year, Showtime/NFL Films; June 17, 1994, ESPN
The Dick Schaap Outstanding Writing Award	Outstanding Music Composition/Direction/Lyrics
2010 FIFA World Cup, ESPN/ABC; 24/7 - Mayweather-Mosley, ESPN/ABC; 24/7 - Penguins-Capitals: Road to the NHL Winter Classic, HBO; Magic & Bird: A Courtship of Rivals, HBO; XXI Olympic Winter Games - Discovery, NBC	NFL on CBS - Super Bowl XLIV - Run This Town', CBS; 2010 FIFA World Cup - Day One Tease ESPN/ABC; Lombardi, HBO; Magic & Bird: A Courtship of Rivals, HBO; NFL on CBS - Super Bowl XLIV - Wynton Marsalis - '43 Years', CBS
Outstanding Live Event Audio/Sound	Outstanding Post Produced Audio/Sound
NASCAR on FOX, FOX; MLB on FOX, FOX; NFL on FOX, FOX	Hard Knocks - Training Camp with the New York Jets, HBO; 24/7 - Penguins-Capitals: Road to the NHL Winter Classic, HBO; Inside the NFL - SOund of the Year, Showtime/NFL Films; NFL on CBS - Super Bowl XLIV - Run This Town, CBS; XXI Olympic Winter Games - Remember the Titans, NBC
Outstanding Graphic Design	Outstanding Production Design/Art Direction
Sports Science, ESPN/BASE Productions; XXI Olympic Winter Games, NBC; 2010 FIFA World Cup, ESPN; ESPNU College Football Whiparound, ESPNU; MLB Network Studio Graphics, MLB Network; NBC Sunday Night Football, NBC	NFL on CBS - Super Bowl XLIV - Run This Town, CBS; 2010 FIFA World Cup, ESPN/ESPN2/ABC; 2010 NBA Draft, ESPN; ESPN NFL Unmasked, ESPN
George Wensel Outstanding Innovative Technical Achievement Award	Outstanding Sport Promotional Announcement, Institutional
US Open Tennis Championships - 3D at US Open Tennis Championships, CBS; Ballpark Cam, MLB Network; Enhanced Visual Accompaniment, ESPN; ESPN3D, ESPN	MLB All-Star Game - Sand, FOX/The Mill; Is It Monday Yet? - Monday Action, An Exit Away, Stone's Throw, ESPN/Wieden& Kennedy; NBC Sports Championship Season, NBC; NHL Winter Classic - Classic Rivalry; Classic Spectacle, NBC; XXI Olympic Winter Games - One Day; Dream It, Win It; One Dream, NBC
Outstanding Sports Promotional Announcement - Episodic	
NFL 'It's Good to Have a Ring' - Booth; Airport; Pool Party, FOX/Smuggler; ESPN Films - 30 for 30 'What if I Told You...?' - Winning Time, The Two Escobars, Pony Express, ESPN; The Open Championship, ESPN/Perception; XXI Olympic Winter Games - One Day; Olympic Showdown; Dancing Stars, NBC	
