= 31st Sports Emmy Awards =

- Date: April 26, 2010
- Location: Frederick P. Rose Hall, Jazz at Lincoln Center, New York City

The 31st Sports Emmy Awards were presented on April 26, 2010 at the Frederick P. Rose Hall at the Jazz at Lincoln Center in New York City.

== Awards ==
=== Programs ===
Outstanding Live Sports Special	Outstanding Live Sports Series
Super Bowl XLIII, NBC; MLB on FOX: The World Series, FOX; NBA Playoffs on TNT, TNT; Stanley Cup Finals, NBC; The Breeder's Cup World Championship, ESPN; The Indianapolis 500, ABC	NBC Sunday Night Football, NBC; College Football on CBS, CBS; Grand Slam Tennis on ESPN, ESPN; NASCAR Summer Series on TNT, TNT; The PGA Tour on CBS, CBS
Outstanding Live Event Turnaround	Outstanding Edited Sports Special
Inside the Headsets - The 25th All Star Race, SPEED; 2009 Bassmaster Classic, ESPN2; 2009 Tour de France, CBS/Versus; Inside the PGA Tour - The Deutsche Bank Championship, PGA Tour Entertainment; The 2009 World Series of Poker Final Table, ESPN	24/7 - Mayweather-Marques, HBO; 2009 Ironman World Championship, NBC; America's Game - The 2008 Pittsburgh Steelers, NFL Network; Incident at Candlestick, MLB Network; Josh Hamilton: Resurrecting the Dream, MLB Network
Outstanding Sports Documentary	Outstanding Edited Sports Series/Anthology
Assault in the Ring, HBO Sports; Ted Williams, HBO Sports; The Legend of Jimmy the Greek, ESPN; The Lost Son of Havana, ESPN Deportes; Without Bias, ESPN	Hard Knocks: Training Camp with the Cincinnati Bengals, HBO Sports; 24/7 - Pacquiao-Hatton & Pacquiao-Cotto, HBO Sports; 30 for 30, ESPN; E:60, ESPN2; NFL Films Presents, NFL Network
Outstanding Studio Show, Weekly	Outstanding Studio Show, Daily
College GameDay, ESPN; FOX NFL Sunday, FOX; Inside the NBA on TNT, TNT; Inside the NFL, CBS/Showtime; MLB Network's Studio 42 with BOB Costas, MLB Network	Pardon the Interruption, ESPN; Inside the NBA on TNT, TNT; MLB Tonight, MLB Network; Outside the Lines First Report, ESPN; SportsCenter, ESPN
Outstanding Sports Journalism	Outstanding Short Feature
E:60 - Wanted: Fugitive, ESPN2; Real Sports with Bryant Gumbel - Back in Bellaire, HBO Sports; Real Sports with Bryant Gumbel - Survivor, HBO Sports; Real Sports with Bryant Gumbel - The Inside Man, HBO Sports; Real Sports with Bryant Gumbel - The Swim Gap, HBO Sports	Inside the NFL - Fighting for #62 - The Nick Reardon Story, CBS/Showitme; E:60 - Glory Days, ESPN2; E:60 - Seeing is Believing, ESPN2; Inside the NFL, CBS/Showitme; Sounds of the Year, NFL Films; NCAA Men's Basketball Championship - Willie's Full Court, CBS; NFL Films Presents - One Shot, NFL Network
Outstanding Long Feature	Outstanding Open/Tease
E:60 - Catfish Hunters, ESPN2; NCAA Men's Basketball Championship - The Magic of J-Mac, CBS; E:60 - Coach, ESPN2; Outside the Lines - Andy Murray, ESPN; Outside the Lines - Carry On, ESPN; Outside the Lines - Pushing the Limits, ESPN	College Football on CBS - Army-Navy Game, CBS; MLB Postseason on TBS, TBS; NBA All-Star Game on TNT, TNT; NBA Playoffs on TNT - Game of Kings, TNT; 2009 Masters Tournament, CBS
Outstanding New Approaches Sports Event Coverage	Outstanding New Approaches Sports Programming
CBS Mobile NCAA March Madness on Demand, CBS Mobile; NFL RedZone, NFL Network; NFL Sunday Ticket Experience on DirecTV, DirecTV; PGA Championship on TNT, PGA.com and Mobile Turner Sports, TNT/PGA.com; Sunday Night Football Extra, NBCSports.com	Super Bowl MVPs, ESPN.com; Cubed, FOXsports.com; NFL Weekly Countdown, NFL Network/NFL.com; On the Fringe - Fighting For Their NFL Lives, NFL.com; Unspeakable, ESPN.com
Outstanding New Approaches - Sports Programming - Short Format	
Countdown to Vancouver, NBCOlympics.com; Red Bull - New Year. No Limits., RedBull/USA.com; Replay: Easton/Phillipsburg, Fox Sports Net; Ring Life, HBO.com; Sincerely, Lou, ESPN.com	

=== Personalities ===
Outstanding Sports Personality, Studio Host	Outstanding Sports Personality, Play-by-Play
Bob Costas, NBC Sports/MLB Network; James Brown, CBS; Bryant Gumbel, HBO Sports; Chris Fowler, ESPN; Ernie Johnson, TNT/TBS	Jim Nantz, CBS Sports; Mike Breen, ABC; Joe Buck, FOX; Mike Emrick, NBC; Al Michaels, NBC; Mike Tirico, ESPN
Outstanding Sports Personality, Studio Analyst	Outstanding Sports Personality, Sports Event Analyst
Kirk Herbstreit, ESPN; Charles Barkley, TNT; Tony Dungy, NBC; Al Leiter, MLB Network; Howie Long, FOX	Cris Collinsworth, NBC Sports; Jon Gruden, ESPN; Jim Kaat, MLB Network; Tim McCarver, FOX; Phil Simms, CBS; Jeff Van Gundy, ABC

=== Technical ===
Outstanding Technical Team Remote	Outstanding Technical Team Studio
Red Bull Air Race World Championship, FSN; ESPN Monday Night Football, ESPN; NASCAR on ESPN, ESPN; NBC Sunday Night Football, NBC	MLB Tonight, MLB Network; 2009 NFL Draft, ESPN; ESPN Pit Studio & Tech Garage, ABC/ESPN/ESPN2; FOX NFL Sunday Special from Afghanistan, FOX; SportsNation, ESPN2
Outstanding Camera Work	Outstanding Editing
24/7 - Pacquiao-Cotto, HBO Sports; 2009 Ironman World Championship, NBC; Hard Knocks: Training Camp with the Cincinnati Bengals, NBC; Inside the NFL, Showtime; NFL Shots of the Year, NFL Films; The Iditarod 2009, Versus	24/7 - Mayweather-Marquez, HBO Sports; 2009 Ironman World Championship, NBC; Hard Knocks: Training Camp with the Cincinnati Bengals, NBC; NASCNAR Cup Season in Review, ESPN2; NBA on TNT, TNT; 24/7 - Pacquiao-Hatton, HBO Sports
The Dick Schaap Writing Award	Outstanding Music Composition/Direction/Lyrics
24/7 - Pacquiao-Hatton, HBO Sports; 2009 Open Championship - Turnberry, Scotland, ABC; Grand Slam Tennis on ESPN, ESPN2; Horse Racing on ESPN, ESPN; NBA Playoffs on TNT, TNT; Wimbledon Primetime, Tennis Channel	Ted Williams, HBO Sports; 2009 Masters Tournament, ESPN; 2009 MLB All-Star Game of FOX, FOX; NBA on TNT, TNT; Truth in 24, FX
Outstanding Live Event Audio/Sound	Outstanding Post Produced Audio/Sound
NASCAR on FOX, FOX; MLB on FOX, FOX; NBC Golf Tour, NBC; NFL on FOX, FOX	Hard Knocks: Training Camp with the Cincinnati Bengals, HBO Sports; Inside the NFL, CBS/Showtime; Sounds of the Year, NFL Films; NASCAR on FOX, FOX; NBA on TNT, TNT; Truth in 24, FX
Outstanding Graphic Design	Outstanding Production Design/Art Direction
MLB Tonight, MLB Network; SportsNation, ESPN2; E:60, ESPN2; Red Bull - New Year. No Limits., ESPN; Red Bull Air Race World Championship, FSN; Winter X Games XIII, ESPN	MLB Tonight, MLB Network; ESPN's NFL Monday Night Football, ESPN; Grand Slam Tennis on ESPN, ESPN2; SportsNation, ESPN2; The Indianapolis 500, ABC; USA vs. Costa Rica Soccer - 2010 FIFA World Cup on ESPN, ESPN
The George Wensel Technical Achievement Award	Outstanding Sports Promotional Announcement - Institutional
US Open Tennis - Flomotion, CBS; Ballpark Cam, MLB Network; EA Sports Virtual Playbook Remote - NBA and College Gameday, ESPN; Enhanced Digital Recreation/Reenactment, MLB Network	2009 Football Season Never Ends - Run, NFL Network; 2009 MLB All-Star Game - Magnet, FOX; 2009 NASCAR on ESPN - Feel Your Heart Race - Start 'Er Up; Wrecks; Numbers, ESPN; Full Color Football - History of the AFL, Showtime; One Game Changes Everything, ESPN; This is SportsCenter, ESPN; Paul Revere; Arnold Palmer; Machine, O Positive
Outstanding Sports Promotional Announcement - Episodic	
24/7 Jimmie Johnson Race to Daytona - Ultrabland, HBO; 2009 NASCAR on FOX - Underground, FOX; 2010 NHL Winter Classic, NBC; Every Second Counts - Look Up, One Second, Rivalry, Versus; NBC Sunday Night Football, NBC	
