= NFL GameDay =

Sports News Television Program / Football TV Series

NFL GameDay is a block of sports news programs broadcast by NFL Network. Premiering on September 10, 2006, the program's various editions serve as NFLN's main pre-game and post-game show featuring news, analysis, and highlights of the National Football League.

NFL GameDay typically airs on Sunday game days, beginning with the pre-game show NFL GameDay Morning. During the afternoon, NFLN then airs NFL GameDay Live, which features analysis and highlights of games in progress. Following the conclusion of the late afternoon games, NFLN airs NFL GameDay Highlights, which focuses on post-game coverage and highlights from the afternoon games. At around 11 p.m. or 11:30 p.m. ET following Sunday Night Football, the block concludes with NFL GameDay Final, which features a final recap of the day's games.

Standalone editions of GameDay Kickoff and GameDay Final air on NFL Network prior to and after Monday and Thursday Night Football, as well as NFL Network-televised games (with GameDay Morning usually pre-empted for its coverage of NFL International Series games taking place in Europe). As of the 2026 season due to ESPN's acquisition of NFL Network, GameDay Kickoff is no longer aired for Monday Night Football, and was replaced with a simulcast of ESPN's NFL Live and Monday Night Countdown.

== Summary ==
Rich Eisen was the initial anchor, and former NFL defensive back Deion Sanders and head coach Steve Mariucci were the analysts when NFL GameDay debuted in September 2006.

NFL Network claims that this is the only long-form highlight show about the league in the late-night slot on Sunday, although Chris Berman and Tom Jackson hosted extended packages called "The Blitz" as part of SportsCenter.

On October 1, 2006, Week 4 of the season, Eisen missed the program. No reason was given for his absence, but Fran Charles filled in as host of the show, just as he sometimes does on NFL Total Access. The following week, October 8, Eisen returned.

Starting in November 2007, NFL GameDay would be shown in Ireland on the over-the-air broadcast network TV3, in a late-night slot on Thursdays.

Effective fall 2010, Rich Eisen is no longer hosting NFL GameDay Final as he is now hosting NFL GameDay Morning. Fran Charles is now the new host, joined by Steve Mariucci, Deion Sanders and Michael Irvin as analysts.

Effective fall 2012, Chris Rose replaces Fran Charles as host on NFL GameDay Final. He is joined by analysts Deion Sanders, Michael Irvin and Marshall Faulk.

Starting in 2018, the show, now known as NFL GameDay Prime is also syndicated to several Fox affiliates as part of the network's Thursday Night Football contract. In 2020 season Deion Sanders became the Head Coach at Jackson State University thus leaving the show and the shows name went back to NFL GameDay Final with Chris Rose hosting and Steve Smith as an analyst.
