= 26th Sports Emmy Awards =

- Date: May 2, 2005
- Location: Frederick P. Rose Hall, Jazz at Lincoln Center, New York City

The 26th Sports Emmy Awards honoring American sports coverage in 2004 were presented on May 2, 2005, at Frederick P. Rose Hall in the Jazz at Lincoln Center, New York City. The nominees were announced on March 9.

== Nominations ==
Winners are in bold

=== Outstanding Live Sports Special ===
- Major League Baseball: Division Series (ESPN)
- **2004 Masters Tournament (CBS)**
- Super Bowl XXXVIII (CBS)
- 2004 Wimbledon Championships (NBC)
- 2004 World Series (FOX)

=== Outstanding Live Sports Series ===
- ESPN Sunday Night Football (ESPN)
- INDY Racing League (ABC/ESPN)
- MLB on Fox (FOX)
- **Monday Night Football** **(ABC)**

=== Outstanding Live Event Turnaround ===
- **The Games of the XXVIII Olympiad (NBC)**
- Great Outdoor Games (ESPN)
- Special Edition Game of the Week: Sounds of the Game (Ravens v. Jets) (NFL Network/NFL Films)
- 2004 Tour de France (CBS)
- 2004 World Figure Skating Championships (ABC)

=== Outstanding Edited Sports Special ===
- 2004 World Series Film (In HD/MLB Productions)
- 6 Days to Sunday (CBS/NFL Films)
- ESPN25: Then & Now (ESPN)
- **Ironman Triathlon World Championship (NBC/Ironman Productions)**
- Manute Bol: Basketball Warrior (NBA TV/NBA Entertainment)

=== Outstanding Sports Documentary ===
- Favre 4-Ever (FOX/NFL Films)
- **The Games of the XXVIII Olympiad: Stylianos Kryiakides, The Journey of a Warrior (NBC)**
- Hitler's Pawn (HBO/Black Canyon Productions/Clear/Channel Entertainment Television)
- Nine Innings From Ground Zero (HBO/MLB Productions)
- Sports Illustrated: 50 Years of Great Stories (ESPN)

=== Outstanding Edited Sports Series/Anthology ===
- Beyond the Glory (Fox Sports Net/Asylum Entertainment)
- ESPN25: The Headlines (ESPN)
- Fearless (OLN/Asylum Entertainment)
- **Real Sports with Bryant Gumbel (HBO)**
- SportsCentury (ESPN Classic)

=== Outstanding Studio Show – Weekly ===
- Fox NFL Sunday (FOX)
- **Inside the NFL** **(HBO)**
- MLB on Fox: Pregame Show (FOX)
- NASCAR on Fox / FX: Prerace Show (FOX/FX)
- Sunday NFL Countdown (ESPN)

=== Outstanding Studio Show – Daily ===
- Baseball Tonight (ESPN)
- The Best Damn Sports Show Period (Fox Sports Net)
- Inside the NBA playoff shows (TNT)
- Outside the Lines Nightly (ESPN)
- Pardon the Interruption (ESPN)
- **SportsCenter** **(ESPN)**

=== Outstanding Sports Personality, Studio Host ===
- Mary Carillo (NBC)
- **Bob Costas (NBC/HBO)**
- Bryant Gumbel (HBO)
- Greg Gumbel (CBS)
- Dan Patrick (ESPN)

=== Outstanding Sports Personality, Play-by-Play ===
- **Joe Buck (FOX)**
- Dick Enberg (CBS)
- Jim Lampley (HBO)
- Al Michaels (ABC)
- Jim Nantz (CBS)

=== Outstanding Sports Personality, Studio Analyst ===
- **Cris Collinsworth (HBO)**
- Michael Irvin (ESPN)
- Howie Long (FOX)
- Harold Reynolds (ESPN)
- Steve Young (ESPN)

=== Outstanding Sports Personality, Sports Event Analyst ===
- Cris Collinsworth (FOX)
- John Madden (ABC)
- Tim McCarver (FOX)
- Johnny Miller (NBC)
- **Joe Morgan (ESPN)**

=== Outstanding Technical Team Remote ===
- Monday Night Football (ABC)
- ESPN Sunday Night Football (ESPN)
- ESPN2 College Football Behind the Scenes (ESPN2)
- **NASCAR on Fox (FOX)**
- X Games X (ESPN/ABC)

=== Outstanding Technical Team Studio ===
- FOX NFL Sunday (FOX)
- MLB on Fox: Pregame Show (FOX)
- **The Games of the XXVIII Olympiad (NBC)**
- This is SportsCenter (ESPN)

=== Outstanding Camera Work ===
- Inside the NFL (HBO)
- Ironman Triathlon World Championship (NBC/Ironman Productions)
- **Road to the Super Bowl XXXVIII (CBS/NFL Films)**
- The Games of the XXVIII Olympiad - The Games Come Home Tease (NBC)

=== Outstanding Editing ===
- Favre 4-Ever (FOX/NFL Films)
- **NFL Films Presents on NFL Network - Michael Zagaris NFL Films (NFL Network)**
- Nine Innings From Ground Zero (HBO/MLB Productions)
- Phil Simms All-Iron Team (CBS)
- **Wimbledon on NBC - Patrick Stewart Tease and Closing Thoughts (NBC)**
- X Games X - Open, Features, Roll-out (ESPN/ABC)

=== The Dick Schaap Outstanding Writing Award ===
- ESPN25: The Headlines - Sept. 11 Attacks Shut Down Sports (ESPN)
- FOX NFL Sunday - Frank's Picks (FOX)
- The Games of the XXVIII Olympiad - The Games Come Home (NBC)
- Wimbledon on ESPN2 - No Rectangles in Nature Feature (ESPN2)
- **Wimbledon on ESPN2 - Wimbledon Reflections ~ written by Dick Enberg (ESPN2)**

=== Outstanding Music Composition/Direction/Lyrics ===
- **Favre 4-Ever (FOX/NFL Films)**
- The Games of the XXVIII Olympiad - The Games Come Home (NBC)
- Hitler's Pawn (HBO/Black Canyon Productions/Clear/Channel Entertainment Television)
- **Nine Innings From Ground Zero (HBO/MLB Productions)**
- 2004 World Figure Skating Championships - STOMP Teases and Bumps (ABC)

=== Outstanding Live Event Audio/Sound ===
- **Great Outdoor Games (ESPN)**
- HBO / HBO PPV World Championship Boxing (HBO)
- MLB on FOX (FOX)
- NASCAR on Fox (FOX)

=== Outstanding Post-Produced Audio/Sound ===
- 2004 Indianapolis 500 - The Chase Tease (ABC)
- **NBA on TNT Thursdays - Opening Game, All-Star Game & Trick Daddy Teases (TNT)**
- Special Edition Game of the Week: Sounds of the Game (Ravens v. Jets) (NFL Network/NFL Films)
- 2004 World Figure Skating Championships - STOMP Teases (ABC)

=== Outstanding Graphic Design ===
- ABC's College Football (ABC)
- **ESPN25 (ESPN)**
- The Games of the XXVIII Olympiad (NBC)

=== Outstanding Production Design/Art Direction ===
- Monday Night Football - Teases (ABC)
- SportsCenter - Studio Set (ESPN)
- The Games of the XXVIII Olympiad - Studio Set (NBC)
- **2004 World Figure Skating Championships - STOMP Teases and Bumps (ABC)**

=== The George Wensel Outstanding Innovative Technical Achievement Award ===
- ESPN Sunday Night Football - Pass Track (ESPN)
- PGA Tour on CBS; U.S. Open Tennis Championships on CBS; NFL on CBS - SwingVision (CBS)
- The Games of the XXVIII Olympiad - Virtual Flags (NBC)
- **The Games of the XXVIII Olympiad - Stromotion (NBC)**

=== Outstanding Sports Journalism ===
- Real Sports with Bryant Gumbel - Paradise Lost: The St. Bonaventure Scandal (HBO)
- Real Sports with Bryant Gumbel - Greyhound Deaths (HBO)
- **Real Sports with Bryant Gumbel - Sport of Sheikhs (HBO)**

=== Outstanding Short Feature ===
- The 2004 Belmont Stakes - Smarty Jones (NBC)
- The Games of the XXVIII Olympiad - Women of the Games (NBC)
- The Games of the XXVIII Olympiad - Pyrros Dimas (NBC)
- Ironman Triathlon World Championship - Sarah Reinertsen (NBC/Ironman Productions)
- PGA Tour Sunday - Payne Stewart Family (USA/PGA Tour Productions)
- **The Super Bowl Today - NFL Quarterbacks (CBS)**

=== Outstanding Long Feature ===
- The Games of the XXVIII Olympiad - A Defining Sunday: 1984, Los Angeles: The First Olympic Women's Marathon (NBC)
- NFL Films Presents on NFL Network - Derrick DeWitt (NFL Network/NFL Films)
- Real Sports with Bryant Gumbel - Westminster Dog Show (HBO)
- SportsCenter - Rainbow Man (ESPN)
- **SportsCenter - Ben Comen (ESPN)**

=== Outstanding Open/Tease ===
- **The Games of the XXVIII Olympiad - The Games Come Home Tease (NBC)**
- 2004 Indianapolis 500 - The Chase Tease (ABC)
- Monday Night Football - The Bengals Return to MNF Tease (ABC)
- 2004 Tour de France - Marcel Tease (CBS)
- 2004 World Figure Skating Championships - STOMP: Ladies & Dance Tease (ABC)

=== Sports Lifetime Achievement Award ===
- **Chet Simmons**, former President of NBC Sports and ESPN

== Most wins ==
By network

- NBC – 8
- HBO – 6
- ESPN – 5
- CBS – 3
- FOX – 3
- ABC – 2
- ESPN2 – 1

By program

- The Games of the XXVIII Olympiad – 5
- Real Sports with Bryant Gumbel – 2
- SportsCenter – 2

== Most nominations ==
By network

- ESPN – 28
- NBC – 23
- FOX – 18
- ABC – 17
- HBO – 17
- CBS – 12
- NFL Network – 4
- ESPN2 – 3
- TNT – 2
- FOX Sports Net – 2
- ESPN Classic – 1
- FX – 1
- In HD – 1
- NBA TV – 1
- OLN – 1
- USA – 1

By program

- The Games of the XXVIII Olympiad – 14
- Real Sports with Bryant Gumbel – 5
- 2004 World Figure Skating Championships – 5
- Monday Night Football – 4
- ESPN25 – 4
- SportsCenter – 4
- ESPN Sunday Night Football – 3
- Favre 4-Ever – 3
- FOX NFL Sunday – 3
- Ironman Triathlon World Championship – 3
- Nine Innings From Ground Zero – 3
- Great Outdoor Games – 2
- Hitler's Pawn – 2
- Indianapolis 500 – 2
- Inside the NFL – 2
- MLB on FOX – 2
- MLB on Fox: Pregame Show – 2
- NASCAR on FOX – 2
- NBA on TNT – 2
- NFL Films Presents on NFL Network – 2
- Special Edition Game of the Week: Sounds of the Game (Ravens v. Jets) – 2
- 2004 Tour de France – 2
- Wimbledon on ESPN2 – 2
- Wimbledon on NBC – 2
- X Games X – 2
