= 33rd Sports Emmy Awards =

- Date: April 30, 2012
- Location: Frederick P. Rose Hall, Jazz at Lincoln Center, New York City

The 33rd Sports Emmy Awards were presented on April 30, 2012, at the Frederick P. Rose Hall at the Jazz at Lincoln Center in New York City.

== Awards ==
=== Programs ===
Outstanding Live Sports Special	Outstanding Live Sports Series
2011 World Series, FOX; 2011 FIFA Women's World Cup Final, ESPN; 2011 Stanley Cup Finals, NBC/Versus; 2011 Daytona 500, FOX; 2011 Masters Tournament	NBC Sunday Night Football, NBC; ESPN Monday Night Football, ESPN; HBO World Championship Boxing/PPV Boxing, HBO; MLB on Fox, FOX; NBA on TNT, TNT
Outstanding Live Event Tournaround	Outstanding Playoff Coverage
Inside the Headsets - The 27th All-Star Challenge, SPEED/NASCAR Media Group; 2011 Tour de France, CBS/Versus; 2011 Track & Field World Championships, NBC; Inside the PGA Tour - PGA Tour Playoffs, Golf Channel/PGA Tour Entertainment; The USA Pro Cycling Challenge - Rematch in the Rockies, Versus/Blink Productions	NBC NFL Wildcard Saturday, NBC; 2011 Big East tournament, ESPN; MLB on Fox - ALCS, FOX; NBA Playoffs on TNT, TNT; SEC Football Championship Game - Georgia vs. LSU, CBS; The 2011 Chase for the Sprint Cup, ESPN
Outstanding Edited Sports Special	Outstanding Sports Documentary
Outside the Lines - Joplin: City of Hope, ESPN2; 24/7 - Mayweather/Ortiz, HBO; Derek Jeter 3K, HBO; E:60 - 'Risk' Special, ESPN2; Sharpe Focus - Journey to Canton, NFL Network	A Game of Honor, Showtime/CBS Sports; Catching Hell, ESPN; McEnroe/Borg: Fire & Ice, HBO; Runnin' Rebels of UNLV, HBO; The Marinovich Project, ESPN; Unguarded, ESPN
Outstanding Edited Sports Series/Anthology	Outstanding Studio Show - Weekly
The Franchise - A Season with the San Francisco Giants, Showtime/MLB Productions; A Football Life, NFL Network; E:60, ESPN2; NFL Turning Point, Versus/NFL Films; World of Adventure Sports, NBC	Inside the NBA, TNT; College GameDay, ESPN; Football Night in America, NBC; Inside the NFL, Showtime/CBS Sports; Sunday NFL Countdown, ESPN
Outstanding Studio Show - Daily	Outstanding Sports Journalism
MLB Tonight, MLB Network; Inside the NBA - Playoffs, TNT; NASCAR Now, ESPN; Pardon the Interruption, ESPN; SportsCenter, ESPN; SportsNation, ESPN2	Real Sports with Bryant Gumbel - The College Bowl Game Money Trail, HBO; E:60 - Nightmare, ESPN2; E:60 - Stranger Than Fiction, ESPN2; E:60 - The Athletes of Bahrain, ESPN2; Real Sports with Bryant Gumbel - Tennis Coach/Child Molester, HBO
Outstanding Short Feature	Outstanding Long Feature
E:60 - Together, ESPN2; SportsCenter - Time Out of Mind, ESPN; Football Night in America - The Greatest Gift, NBC; Human Highlight Reel - Manny Ohonme: The Great Samaritan, CBS/CBS Turner Sports; SportsCenter - White Gold, ESPN; Winter X Games XV - Kevin Michael Connolly, ESPN	Outside the Lines - The Man Behind the Red Bandana, ESPN; E:60 - Dead Solid Perfect, ESPN2; NCAA men's basketball tournament - Amongst Friends: A Story of Loss and Healing, CBS; Outside the Lines - Never Forgotten, ESPN; Outside the Lines - The Promise, ESPN
Outstanding Open/Tease	Outstanding New Approaches Sports Event Coverage
NBA on TNT - NBA Forever, TNT; 2011 NBA Playoffs on TNT - Dominoes, TNT; 2011 Open Championship - Round 3 - Saturday Open, ESPN; 24/7 - Flyers-Rangers: Road to the NHL Winter Classic, HBO; The Army-Navy Game, CBS; The Indianapolis 500, ABC/ESPN	PGA Championship LIVE on PGA.com, PGA.com; March Madness on Demand, NCAA.com/CBS Sports/Turner Sports; MLB.com at Bat 11, MLB Advanced Media; NBA League Pass, NBA.com/NBA Digital; NFL Sunday Ticket Experience, DIRECTV
Outstanding New Approaches Sports Programming	
A Game of Honor, CBSSports.com; Football Freakonomics, NFL Network/NFL.com; Sport Science, ESPN.com; Sunday Night Football Extra, NBCSports.com; The NFL Season: A Biography, NFL Network/NFL.com	

=== Personalities ===
Outstanding Sports Personality, Studio Host	Outstanding Sports Personality, Play-by-Play
Bob Costas, NBC Sports/MLB Network; Bryant Gumbel, HBO; Dan Patrick, NBC/DIRECTV; Ernie Johnson, TNT/NBA TV; James Brown, CBS/Showtime	Joe Buck, FOX Sports; Al Michaels, NBC; Jim Nantz, CBS; Marv Albert, CBS/TBS/TNT; Mike Emrick, NBC/Versus
Outstanding Sports Personality, Studio Analyst	Outstanding Sports Personality, Sports Event Analyst
Charles Barkley, CBS/NBA TV/TNT; Al Leiter, MLB Network; Cris Collinsworth, Showtime; Harold Reynolds, MLB Network; Kirk Herbstreit, ESPN; Skip Bayless, ESPN2; Trent Dilfer, ESPN	Cris Collinsworth, NBC; Gary Danielson, CBS; Jim Kaat, MLB Network; Jon Gruden, ESPN; Mike Mayock, NBC/NFL Network
Outstanding Sports Personality, Sports Reporter	
Michele Tafoya, NBC; Craig Sager, TBS/TNT; Ken Rosenthal, FOX; Pierre McGuire, NBC/Versus; Tracy Wolfson, CBS	

=== Technical ===
Outstanding Technical Team Remote	Outstanding Technical Team Studio
MLB on Fox, FOX; Winter X Games XV, ESPN3D; NASCAR on Fox, FOX; US Open Championship, Golf Channel/NBC	MLB Tonight, MLB Network; NASCAR on ESPN, ABC/ESPN/ESPN2; NASCAR on Fox, FOX; NCAA men's basketball tournament - Road to the Final Four, CBS/TBS/TNT/truTV/CBS Sports/Turner Sports
Outstanding Camera Work	Outstanding Editing
2011 Ironman World Championship, NBC; 24/7 - Cotto vs. Margarito, HBO; 24/7 - Flyers-Rangers: Road to the NHL Winter Classic, HBO; A Game of Honor, Showtime/CBS Sports; Grand Slam Tennis on ESPN, ESPN2; NFL Films Presents - Shots of the Season, NFL Network; The Promise, ESPN	24/7 - Pacquiao-Marques, HBO; 24/7 - Flyers-Rangers: Road to the NHL Winter Classic, HBO; A Game of Honor, Showtime/CBS Sports; Grand Slam Tennis on ESPN, ESPN2; Joplin: City of Hope, ESPN; Unguarded, ESPN
The Dick Schaap Writing Award	Outstanding Music Composition/Direction/Lyrics
24/7 - Flyers-Rangers: Road to the NHL Winter Classic, HBO; 2011 Open Championship - Round 3 Open, ESPN; NBC Sunday Night Football - Bob Costas Essays, NBC; NFL GameDay Mornings - Lombardi Returns, NFL Network; The Kentucky Derby, NBC	Ed Sabol's Last Football Movie - Men of Mettle, NFL Network; 2011 NBA Moments on TNT - NBA All-Star Game on TNT & NBA Playoffs on TNT, TNT; McEnroe/Borg: Fire & Ice, HBO; ESPN Monday Night Football, ESPN; The Army-Navy Game - Opening Tease, CBS; The Curious Case of Curt Flood, HBO; The Franchise - A Season with the San Francisco Giants, Showtime
Outstanding Live Event Audio/Sound	Outstanding Post Produced Audio/Sound
MLB on Fox, FOX; NASCAR on Fox, FOX; NFL on Fox, FOX; Winter X Games XV, ESPN	Sound FX: All Access, NFL Network; 24/7 - Flyers-Rangers: Road to the NHL Winter Classic, HBO; NBA on TNT, TNT; NFL Films Presents - Super Bowl XLV, NFL Films; The Army-Navy Game - Opening Tease, CBS
Outstanding Graphic Design	Outstanding Production Design/Art Direction
Sport Science, ESPN; 2011 FIFA Women's World Cup, ESPN/ESPN2; ESPN Monday Night Football, ESPN; NBA All-Star Weekend, TNT; NBC Sunday Night Football, NBC	NBC Sunday Night Football, NBC; 2011 FIFA Women's World Cup, ESPN; 2011 NBA Draft, ESPN; NASCAR on Fox, FOX; Sunday NFL Countdown, ESPN
The George Wensel Technical Achievement Award	Outstanding Sports Promotional Announcement - Institutional
America's Cup Highlight Show - Live Line, Versus; Nascar on Fox/MLB on Fox - Hot Trax/Hot Spot, Fox; The DIAMOND Platform, MLB Network/MLB.com; The Masters - 3D Coverage, ESPN3D	NBA on TNT - Shaq 'Get Ready', TNT; All in One Place - All in One Place; Time Line, MLB Network; It's Not Crazy, It's Sports - Fanwiches, Proposal, Towel Around the World, ESPN/O Positive/Moxie Pictures; NFL GameDay Morning - Carpool, NFL Network; NFL on Fox - Better on FOX, FOX
Outstanding Sports Promotional Announcement - Episodic	
2011 Stanley Cup Finals - No Words, NBC; 24/7 - Flyers-Rangers: Road to the NHL Winter Classic - The Ultimate Rivalry, HBO; A Game of Honor, Showtime; Bill Belichick: A Football Life - Meet Bill Belichick, NFL Network; NFL Kickoff, NBC	
