= Outstanding Live Sports Series =

The Sports Emmy Award for Outstanding Live Sports Series has been awarded since 1976. Unlike the award for Outstanding Live Sports Special, this award is given to networks for a weekly series in which a specific sport is televised live.

== List of winners ==
- 1975-76: Monday Night Football (ABC)
- 1976-77: The NFL Today/NFL on CBS (CBS)
- 1977-78: The NFL Today/NFL on CBS (CBS)
- 1978-79: Monday Night Football (ABC)
- 1979-80: College Football on ABC (ABC)
- 1980-81: PGA Golf Tour (CBS)
- 1981-82: NFL on CBS (CBS)
- 1982-83: NFL on CBS (CBS)
- 1983-84: no award was given
- 1984-85: no award was given
- 1985-86: no award was given
- 1986-87: NFL on CBS (CBS)
- 1987-88: Monday Night Football (ABC)
- 1988: CBS's coverage of the 1988 NCAA Division I men's basketball tournament (CBS)
- 1989: Monday Night Football (ABC)
- 1990: CBS's coverage of the 1990 NCAA Division I men's basketball tournament (CBS)
- 1991: CBS's coverage of the 1991 NCAA Division I men's basketball tournament (CBS)
- 1992: CBS's coverage of the 1992 NCAA Division I men's basketball tournament (CBS)
- 1993: Monday Night Football (ABC)
- 1994: Monday Night Football (ABC)
- 1995: ESPN SpeedWorld (ESPN)
- 1996: ESPN SpeedWorld (ESPN)
- 1997: Monday Night Football (ABC)
- 1998: NBC Golf Tour (NBC)
- 1999: Major League Baseball on Fox regular season coverage (FOX)
- 2000: ESPN Sunday Night Football (ESPN)
- 2001: NASCAR on Fox (FOX)
- 2002: The NBA on NBC (NBC)
- 2003: ESPN Sunday Night Football (ESPN)
- 2004: Monday Night Football (ABC)
  - ESPN Sunday Night Football (ESPN)
  - INDY Racing League (ABC/ESPN)
  - MLB on Fox (FOX)
- 2005: NASCAR on Fox (FOX)
  - ESPN College Football (ESPN)
  - ESPN Sunday Night Football (ESPN)
  - Monday Night Football (ABC)
  - NFL on CBS (CBS)
- 2006: NASCAR on NBC / TNT (NBC/TNT)
  - ESPN College Football (ESPN)
  - ESPN Major League Baseball (ESPN)
  - HBO PPV Boxing (HBO)
  - Monday Night Football (ESPN)
- 2007: NASCAR on Fox (FOX)
  - Monday Night Football (ESPN)
  - NBA on ESPN (ESPN) / NBA on ABC (ABC)
  - NBC Golf Tour (NBC)
  - NBC Sunday Night Football (NBC)
  - NFL on Fox (FOX)
- 2008: NBC Sunday Night Football (NBC)
  - ESPN College Football (ABC)
  - Monday Night Football (ESPN)
  - NASCAR on Fox (FOX)
  - NASCAR on TNT Summer Series (TNT)
- 2009: NBC Sunday Night Football (NBC)
  - College Football on CBS (CBS)
  - Grand Slam Tennis on ESPN (ESPN)
  - NASCAR on TNT Summer Series (TNT)
  - PGA Tour on CBS (CBS)
- 2010: NBC Sunday Night Football (NBC)
  - ESPN College Football (ESPN)
  - Monday Night Football (ESPN)
  - NASCAR on Fox (FOX) / NASCAR on Speed (Speed)
  - NFL on Fox (FOX)
- 2011: NBC Sunday Night Football (NBC)
  - HBO WCB/PPV Boxing (HBO)
  - MLB on Fox (FOX)
  - Monday Night Football (ESPN)
  - NBA on TNT (TNT)
- 2012: NBC Sunday Night Football (NBC)
  - Monday Night Football (ESPN)
  - NASCAR on Fox (FOX) / NASCAR on Speed (Speed)
  - NBA on TNT (TNT)
  - NFL on Fox (FOX)
- 2013: NBC Sunday Night Football (NBC)
  - ESPN College Football (ABC)
  - HBO Boxing (HBO)
  - Monday Night Football (ESPN)
  - SEC on CBS (CBS)
- 2014: NASCAR on Fox (FOX/Fox Sports 1)
  - ESPN College Football (ABC/ESPN/SEC Network)
  - Monday Night Football (ESPN)
  - NBC Sunday Night Football (NBC)
- 2015: NBC Sunday Night Football (NBC)
  - ESPN College Football (ESPN/ABC)
  - NASCAR on Fox (FOX/Fox Sports 1)
  - NFL on Fox (FOX)
  - Thursday Night Football (CBS/NFL Network)
- 2016: NBC Sunday Night Football (NBC)
  - ESPN College Football (ESPN/ABC)
  - Monday Night Football (ESPN)
  - NASCAR on Fox (FOX/Fox Sports 1)
  - NFL on Fox (FOX)
- 2017: NBC Sunday Night Football (NBC)
  - NASCAR on Fox (FOX/FS1)
  - NBA on TNT (TNT)
  - NFL on Fox (FOX)
  - Thursday Night Football (NBC/NFL Network)
- 2018: NBC Sunday Night Football (NBC)
  - ESPN Major League Baseball (ESPN)
  - Golf Channel on NBC (NBC)
  - NFL on CBS (CBS)
  - SEC on CBS (CBS)
- 2022: Monday Night Football with Peyton & Eli (ESPN2/ESPN+)
  - Fox College Football (FOX/FS1)
  - Fox MLB (FOX/FS1)
  - NFL on CBS (CBS)
  - Sunday Night Football (NBC)
- 2023: Monday Night Football (ESPN)
  - NFL on CBS (CBS)
  - Saturday Night College Football (ESPN/ESPN2/ABC)
  - Sunday Night Football (NBC)
  - Thursday Night Football (Prime Video)
- 2024: Monday Night Football with Peyton & Eli (ESPN2)
  - Fox College Football (FOX/FS1)
  - NFL on Fox (FOX)
  - Monday Night Football (ESPN/ABC)
  - Sunday Night Football (NBC/Peacock)
- 2025: SEC on ABC (ABC/ESPN+)
  - College Football on CBS (CBS Sports)
  - Monday Night Football (ESPN)
  - NFL on Fox (FOX)
  - Sunday Night Football (NBC/Peacock)

== Multiple wins ==
10 wins

- NBC Sunday Night Football

9 wins

- Monday Night Football

5 wins

- NFL on CBS

4 wins

- CBS's coverage of the NCAA Division I men's basketball tournament
- NASCAR on Fox

2 wins

- ESPN SpeedWorld
- ESPN Sunday Night Football
- Monday Night Football with Peyton & Eli
- The NFL Today
