= Grantland Basketball Hour =

Primetime show on ESPN, 2014-15

The Grantland Basketball Hour is a primetime show that aired on ESPN, ESPN2, and ESPN on ABC in which sports and pop culture journalist, Bill Simmons and sports media journalist Jalen Rose discussed current events surrounding the NBA. The show began on October 21, 2014, and was contracted by ESPN for 18 episodes to cover the 2014–15 NBA season.
