= College GameDay =

College GameDay or ESPN College GameDay may refer to one of several shows produced by the sports network, ESPN:

- College GameDay (football TV program), television program about college football, 1987–present
- College GameDay (basketball TV program), television program about college basketball, 2005–present
- ESPN Radio College GameDay, radio program about college football, 2000–present
