= Tom Jackson (American football, born 1951) =

American football player and broadcaster (1951–2026)

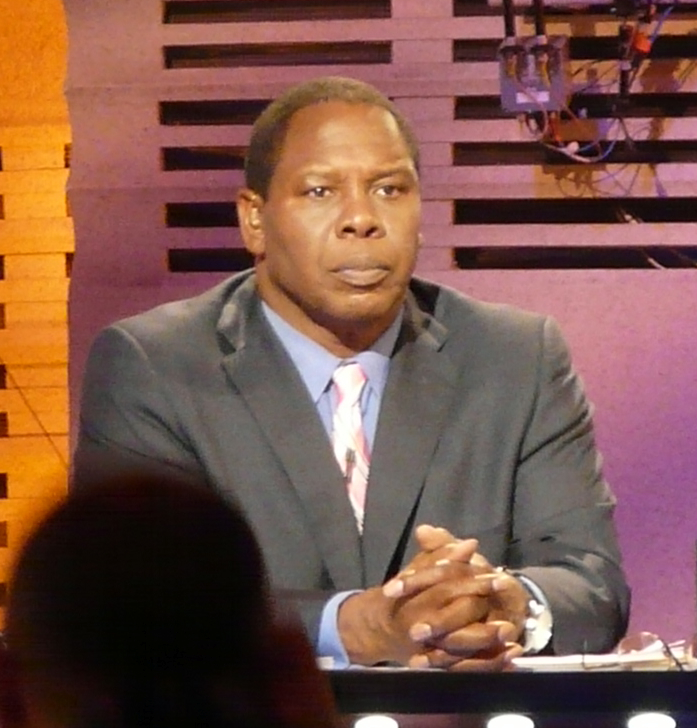
- Jackson at the 2010 NFL draft

No. 56, 57
- Position: Linebacker

Personal information
- Born: April 4, 1951; Cleveland, Ohio, U.S.
- Died: November 20, 2026 (aged 75); Cincinnati, Ohio, U.S.
- Listed height: 5 ft 11 in (1.80 m)
- Listed weight: 220 lb (100 kg)

Career information
- High school: John Adams (Cleveland)
- College: Louisville
- NFL draft: 1973: 4th round, 88th overall pick

Career history
- Denver Broncos (1973–1986)

Awards and highlights
- First-team All-Pro (1977); 2× Second-team All-Pro (1978, 1979); 3× Pro Bowl (1977–1979); Denver Broncos 50th Anniversary Team; Denver Broncos Ring of Fame; Second-team All-American (1972); Louisville Cardinals Ring of Honor; Pete Rozelle Radio-Television Award (2015)

Career NFL statistics
- Sacks: 40.0
- Interceptions: 20
- Touchdowns: 3
- Stats at Pro Football Reference

Thomas Louie Jackson, also referred to as "TJ" or "Tommy", (April 4, 1951 – November 20, 2026) was an American football player and sports commentator. He played professionally as a linebacker for the Denver Broncos of the National Football League (NFL) from 1973 to 1986. He was a member of Denver's "Orange Crush Defense" and helped lead the Broncos to Super Bowl appearances in 1977 and 1986. After his playing career, had a 29-year run as an NFL analyst for ESPN. He was given the Pete Rozelle Award for excellence in broadcasting by the Pro Football Hall of Fame in 2015.

== Playing career ==
=== Early life ===
Jackson attended John Adams High School, where he played football, baseball, and also was a wrestler. He was a fan of the Cleveland Browns and he and his father attended many games. Jackson credited his wrestling coach with developing his mental toughness and character. "He was a 140-pound guy named John Bianchi, the toughest little Italian man I ever knew. He drove us unbelievably and probably drove me more than he drove the rest of my teammates. I look back very fondly on his help building of my character." Jackson's mother died when he was a teenager.

=== College ===
Jackson dreamed of attending Ohio State, but the Buckeyes had little interest in the undersized Jackson. He was recruited by University of Louisville head coach, and former college football analyst, Lee Corso. He attended Louisville and played football for three seasons from 1970 to 1972.

During his college career, he was a two-time Missouri Valley Conference player of the year selection in 1970 and 1972. Playing linebacker, he led the Cardinals in tackles all three years and led the team to an overall record of 23–7–2.

His jersey number 50 was honored by Louisville in 1999. He was inducted to the Athletic Hall of Fame in 2003.

=== Professional (1973–1986) ===
Jackson was selected 88th overall by the Denver Broncos in the fourth round of the 1973 NFL draft. He enjoyed a 14-year career in Denver where he was a three-time Pro Bowl selection, a four-time All-Pro selection, and was voted Denver's Most Inspirational Player six times by his teammates. He also helped lead the team to championship appearances in Super Bowl XII and Super Bowl XXI.

Jackson was one of only four players to play for the Broncos in both of the aforementioned Super Bowls, played nine years apart. He retired with 20 career interceptions returned for 340 total yards and three touchdowns, and eight fumble recoveries returned for 104 yards. He also recorded 13 sacks (with a season high 5-1/2) as a weak-side blitzer in Denver's 3-4 defense according to Broncos records. Jackson ranks third only to Jason Elam and John Elway on the team's all-time list of games played with 191. He retired tied for the franchise lead for interceptions by a linebacker with 20.

Jackson became the 14th person inducted in the Broncos' Ring of Fame in 1992. He was also named to the 50th Anniversary Team in 2009.

Jackson published Blitz: An Autobiography in 1987 which focused on his career with the Broncos. The book was written with long-time Denver Post sports columnist Woody Paige.

== Broadcasting career (1987–2016; 2019–2020) ==
Jackson joined ESPN studios in 1987 where he was teamed with Chris Berman on the network's signature NFL shows, Sunday NFL Countdown and NFL Primetime. Sunday NFL Countdown, the weekly Sunday morning pre-game show, has won seven Sports Emmy awards for Outstanding Studio Show—Weekly (1988, 1991, 1994, 1995, 2001, 2003 and 2007 seasons). On Monday Night Countdown, Jackson hosted the segment "Jacked Up!", which featured five hits from the previous day's games. The show's hosts recited the title phrase as they watched some of the most punishing hits inflicted by players on the field.

Jackson's pre-ESPN broadcasting experience included co-host positions for both "Broncos Beat", a weekly show on KCNC-TV in Denver, Colorado and a post-game show on KUSA-TV. He had also hosted a daily syndicated sports commentary radio show, "Behind the Line".

In 1995 Jackson appeared in the "Eggheads" episode of the American science fiction television series Sliders, playing a color commentator during the Mindgame scenes. In week 2 of the 2003 regular season, Jackson declared that the New England Patriot players "hate their coach" Bill Belichick, who wound up winning the next two Super Bowls with the team.

During his career as a broadcaster, he was known for his outspoken commentary on social issues in addition to his football knowledge.

Jackson retired from ESPN after the 2016 Pro Football Hall of Fame induction ceremony on August 6, 2016.

On January 20, 2019, Jackson reunited with Berman on a special playoff edition of NFL Primetime after the AFC and NFC Championship Games.

On September 13, 2019, ESPN announced that Berman and Jackson would return for a new digital-only edition of NFL Primetime, streaming weekly throughout the NFL season on ESPN+ beginning on September 15, 2019. The program was scheduled to stream live at 7:30 p.m. ET on Sundays and be updated with highlights for the Sunday and Monday night games upon their completion.

Jackson opted out of his Primetime hosting duties for the 2020 season over concerns about the coronavirus pandemic.

== Awards ==
In July 2015 Jackson was named the 2015 recipient of the prestigious Pete Rozelle Radio-Television Award from the Pro Football Hall of Fame.

== Personal life and death ==
Jackson resided in Cincinnati, Ohio with his wife, Jennifer, a former flight attendant whom he met in Hawaii at the 1990 Pro Bowl. They have two daughters, Taylor and Morgan. He also had a daughter, Andrea Jackson, who died on August 7, 1997, at the age of nine in a car accident.

Jackson died in Cincinnati on November 20, 2026, at the age of 75.
