= Inside the NFL =

American weekly sports show

- Genre: Sports
- Presented by: Al Meltzer (1977–1978); Chuck Bednarik (1977–1978); Merle Harmon (1978–1980); Len Dawson (1978–2001); Nick Buoniconti (1980–2001); Cris Collinsworth (1990–2013); Jimmy Johnson (1994–1995); Jerry Glanville (1996–2001); Dan Marino (2000–2007); Bob Costas (2002–2007); Cris Carter (2002–2007); James Brown (2008–2013; 2016–2023); Greg Gumbel (2014); Adam Schein (2015); Ryan Clark (2023–present)
- Starring: Warren Sapp; Bill Cowher; Joe Theismann; Phil Simms; Brandon Marshall; Ray Lewis; Julian Edelman; Channing Crowder; Jay Cutler; Chad Johnson; Chris Long; Bill Belichick
- Country of origin: United States
- Original language: English
- No. of seasons: 48

Production
- Running time: 60 minutes
- Production company: NFL Films

Original release
- Network: HBO (1977–2008); Showtime (2008–2021); Paramount+ (2021–2023); The CW (2023–2025); X/Twitter (2025–present)
- Release: September 22, 1977 – present

Inside the NFL is an American weekly television sports show that focuses on the National Football League (NFL).

Each NFL season, the program airs from Week 1 of the regular season until the week after the Super Bowl. The show principally features highlights of the previous week's games that were captured by NFL Films, in addition to commentary and analysis by the hosts, and occasional interviews with current and former NFL players and personnel.

The show originally aired on HBO from 1977 through 2008. Following Super Bowl XLII, it moved to Showtime, airing there until 2021, when it moved to streaming service Paramount+. In April 2023, it was reported that Paramount+ had canceled the show; it was revived and acquired by The CW later that June.

== History ==
Inside the NFL first aired in 1977 and had been cable television's longest-running series until it departed for Paramount+. The first episode followed San Diego Chargers quarterback Rhett Swanson from his final college pass at USC to draft day. The show is significant for being the first regular weekly sports program on HBO outside its live sports coverage, and the first NFL-endorsed program to air on a premium subscription television platform. The original hosts were Al Meltzer, at the time play-by-play man for the Buffalo Bills, and Chuck Bednarik, Pro Football Hall of Fame two-way player for the Philadelphia Eagles.

=== 1978–2001 ===
In 1978, Meltzer and Bednarik left the show and were replaced by Merle Harmon and Hall of Fame quarterback Len Dawson respectively. In 1980, Merle Harmon left for NBC as Len Dawson was joined by fellow Hall of Famer and former Miami Dolphins linebacker Nick Buoniconti. In 1989, newly retired Cris Collinsworth joined as an on-air reporter. In 1990, Collinsworth joined Dawson and Buoniconti as the third host. Several former players and coaches served as co-host throughout this period including Jimmy Johnson and Jerry Glanville.

From 1999 to 2001, the hosts of Inside the NFL appeared on HBO's corporate cousin, Cartoon Network, hosting faux pregame shows for the network's Big Game specials (featuring classic theatrical cartoons edited together as a parody of the Super Bowl).

=== 2001–2006 ===
After the 2001 NFL season, Len Dawson and Nick Buoniconti retired from the show. From the 2002–2007 seasons, the show was hosted by Bob Costas with former players Dan Marino, Cris Collinsworth, and Cris Carter serving as co-hosts. Bob Costas acknowledged this change in the season's first episode and paid tribute to the former hosts. In addition to the change in hosts, Inside the NFL also featured segments featuring comics such as George Lopez, Jim Florentine, Lewis Black and Wanda Sykes.

During the last three weeks of the 2005 NFL season, Real Sports host Bryant Gumbel filled in for Bob Costas. Costas was unavailable because he was in Turin, Italy preparing to cover the 2006 Winter Olympics for NBC.

In a special 30th anniversary episode that aired in December 2006, Len Dawson and Nick Buoniconti returned to co-host the show.

=== 2008–2023: Showtime and Paramount+ ===
On February 6, 2008, HBO suddenly announced that Inside the NFL would end its run after 31 seasons. HBO Sports cited increased competition in NFL-related programming since Inside the NFL's inception as a reason for its cancellation. Skeptics, however, believe that the real reason for HBO's decision to cancel Inside the NFL was due to the increasing cost for usage of the NFL Films produced highlights. In the final episode, a special video with highlights from the series' 31 seasons was aired. In addition, former hosts Dawson and Buoniconti did the final signoff as the credits rolled. Bob Costas soon regarded the cancellation by HBO as being a "boneheaded" move.

On June 3, 2008, CBS Sports and NFL Films announced that Inside the NFL would be revived and moved to CBS Corporation-owned Showtime and would air on Wednesdays starting September 10 (9 p.m. ET/PT) on Showtime. Inside the NFL aired every Wednesday throughout the 2008 NFL season through February 11, 2009. It was produced by CBS Sports and NFL Films. On July 6, it was announced that James Brown would host Inside the NFL, the role Bob Costas had on HBO. Brown would also be joined by lead CBS NFL analyst Phil Simms, retired former Defensive Player of the Year Warren Sapp and the returning Cris Collinsworth. Jenn Brown joined the team as the first female special correspondent on the show. Her main responsibility would be to do various features throughout the season. While Sapp was competing on Dancing with the Stars, former Pittsburgh Steelers head coach and current NFL Today analyst Bill Cowher along with former Washington Redskins quarterback Joe Theismann filled in.

In the 2019 NFL season, Inside the NFL was hosted by James Brown, Phil Simms, Brandon Marshall and Ray Lewis.

On February 24, 2021, it was announced that Inside the NFL would move from Showtime to Paramount+, with former Patriots wide receiver Julian Edelman also becoming a part of the series. The season premiered on September 7, 2021.

On April 5, 2023, it was reported that Paramount+ canceled Inside the NFL, with the NFL shopping it to other outlets.

=== 2023–2025: The CW ===
On June 7, 2023, it was announced that The CW renewed the series for season 47, which premiered on September 5, 2023. On August 30, 2023, it was announced that former Steelers safety Ryan Clark would be the show's new host, along with Channing Crowder, Jay Cutler, Chad Johnson and Chris Long as analysts.

In January 2024, episodes became available next-day on streaming service Netflix.

On July 11, 2024, it was announced that former Patriots head coach Bill Belichick would join the show, with Crowder and Cutler not returning.

On May 30, 2025, the NFL announced that The CW declined to renew the show for the 2025 season.

=== 2025–present: Twitter/X ===
Inside the NFL moved to X, formerly Twitter, on September 8, 2025. The show modified its segments to become more short form. NFL Films continues to produce the show and Ryan Clark remains as host.

== Format ==
Much like other shows on pay-cable networks and streaming providers, Inside the NFL had the freedom to stray from the traditional network format for its program. While the basic elements were the same as any other sports recap show by featuring highlights of the week's games and discussion of events around the league, the fact that there were no commercials allowed the panel to discuss subjects at length without the normal network time restrictions until the move to The CW.

=== Highlights ===
The highlight segments consist of NFL Films footage of the previous week's games with narration by Scott Graham (previously Harry Kalas until his death in 2009). This has long been considered a major asset of the show as the game highlights are filmed and packaged longer than the average highlights package using game broadcast video and without any digital on-screen graphics marring the presentation. It also aired on premium services, meaning there was no advertising through the hour.

In recent years, the show has removed lower-profile games for more extended analysis of the top games; the transition to The CW removed some games to account for it now being a program with traditional advertising.

=== Interviews ===
Aside from the highlights, Inside the NFL features in-depth interview segments with various players, coaches and front office personnel. Among the notable segments over the years was Cris Carter interviewing former coach Buddy Ryan. Ryan was Carter's first head coach when both were with the Philadelphia Eagles in the late 1980s and early 1990s. Ryan released Carter with his explanation being the infamous quote "All he does is catch touchdowns." The interview revealed what some had learned over the years, that Ryan released Carter because of his substance abuse problems that were affecting his performance but did not want that to become public, lest it hinder Carter's chances to sign with another team. Carter admitted that his release was a wake-up call and saved his life as he became a born again Christian soon after, and went on to have a successful NFL career with the Minnesota Vikings in which he became the NFL's second-leading receiver of all time.

=== Production ===
==== HBO ====
The show was taped in a New York City studio on Wednesday and aired at various times throughout the week beginning Wednesday nights at 10 p.m. Eastern Time.

==== Showtime and Paramount ====
The show was taped at NFL Films' headquarters in Mount Laurel, New Jersey on Tuesday and aired at various times throughout the week beginning Tuesday nights at 9 p.m. Eastern Time. Greg Gumbel was replaced in September 2015 by Adam Schein of CBS Sports, with Brown returning in 2016 as host and Schein taking a supporting role.

==== The CW ====
The show continues to be produced by NFL Films, led by executive producers Ross Ketover, Pat Kelleher and Keith Cossrow. Season 47 aired on Tuesdays at 8 p.m. ET. Due to WWE NXT airing on Tuesdays, season 48 airs on Fridays at 9 p.m. ET (where same-week encores aired in 2023) starting on August 30, 2024, later it was moved to Wednesdays at 9 p.m. ET in October.
