= E:60 =

US television program

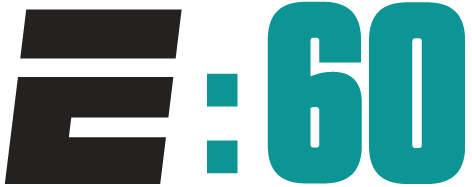
- Genre: Newsmagazine
- Presented by: Lisa Salters; Jeremy Schaap
- Country of origin: United States
- Original language: English

Original release
- Network: ESPN
- Release: October 16, 2007 – present

E:60 is an American sports newsmagazine broadcast by ESPN. The series features investigative journalism, focusing upon news, issues, and other stories in sports.

In January 2017, after having had no consistent timeslot since its October 2007 debut, it was announced that E:60 would be re-launched as a live, Sunday-morning program hosted by Bob Ley and Jeremy Schaap, beginning on May 14, 2017. It replaced The Sports Reporters and the Sunday edition of Ley's fellow program Outside the Lines. The revamped program shares a new studio with Outside the Lines, and features contributions from its staff.

== Accolades ==
=== Emmy Awards ===
| Feature | Category | Year |
|---|---|---|
| "Catfish Hunters" | Outstanding Long Feature | 2009 |
| "Wanted: Fugitive (Binghamton Basketball)" | Outstanding Sports Journalism | 2009 |
| "Survival I" | Outstanding Long Feature | 2010 |
| "Together" | Outstanding Long Feature | 2011 |
| "Beitar: Jerusalem" | Outstanding Sports Journalism | 2012 |
| "Children of the Ring" | Outstanding Sports Journalism | 2013 |
| "Dream On: Stories of Boston's Strongest" | Outstanding Edited Sports Coverage | 2014 |
| "Dream On: Stories of Boston's Strongest" | Outstanding Open/Tease | 2014 |
| "Owen and Haatchi" | Outstanding Long Feature | 2014 |
| "Ernie Johnson" | Outstanding Long Feature | 2015 |
| E:60 | Outstanding News Anthology | 2015 |
| "Life As Matt" | Outstanding Long Feature | 2017 |
| "Fight On" | Outstanding Long Feature | 2018 |
| "The Dictator's Team" | Outstanding Sports Journalism | 2018 |

=== Edward R. Murrow Awards ===
| Feature | Category | Year |
|---|---|---|
| "Catfish Hunters" | Video Sports Reporting | 2009 |
| "Angel in the Outfield" | Video Sports Reporting | 2011 |
| "Hero" | Audio Sports Reporting | 2011 |
| "Enemy Within" | Audio Sports Reporting | 2013 |
| "Owen and Haatchi" | Feature Reporting | 2014 |
| "Love is Stronger" | Radio Feature Reporting | 2015 |
| "The Turf War" | Investigative Reporting | 2015 |
| "The Last Round" | Feature Reporting | 2017 |
| "The Number" | Sports Reporting | 2017 |

In addition, E:60 also has the following accolades:

- 8 National Headliner Awards
- 38 New York Festivals Awards
- 5 NAMIC Awards
- 5 NABJ Awards
- 2 Gracie Awards
- 2 Eclipse Awards
- 1 Robert F. Kennedy Journalism Award
- 1 Peabody Award for "Spartan Silence: Crisis at Michigan State"

== See also ==
- Real Sports with Bryant Gumbel
- 60 Minutes Sports
