= 44th Sports Emmy Awards =

- Date: May 22, 2023
- Location: Jazz at Lincoln Center's Frederick P. Rose Hall, New York City
- Most awards: 2022 FIFA World Cup; XXIV Olympic Winter Games (3)
- Most nominations: NFL 360 (10); XXIV Olympic Winter Games (10)

The 44th Sports Emmy Awards were presented by the National Academy of Television Arts and Sciences (NATAS), honoring the best in American sports television coverage in 2022. The ceremony took place in-person at the Jazz at Lincoln Center's Frederick P. Rose Hall in New York City.

The nominations were announced on April 11, 2023. ESPN received the most nominations with 59, while NFL 360 and the XXIV Olympic Winter Games were the most nominated programs, both with 10 nominations. American journalist and sportcaster Bryant Gumbel was honored with the Sports Lifetime Achievement Award. During the ceremony, he was also one of the recipients for Outstanding Hosted Edited Series, as a host of Real Sports with Bryant Gumbel.

The coverage for the 2022 FIFA World Cup and for the XXIV Olympic Winter Games were the most awarded programs with three wins. ESPN and its channels won the most awards with thirteen wins.

== Winners and nominees ==
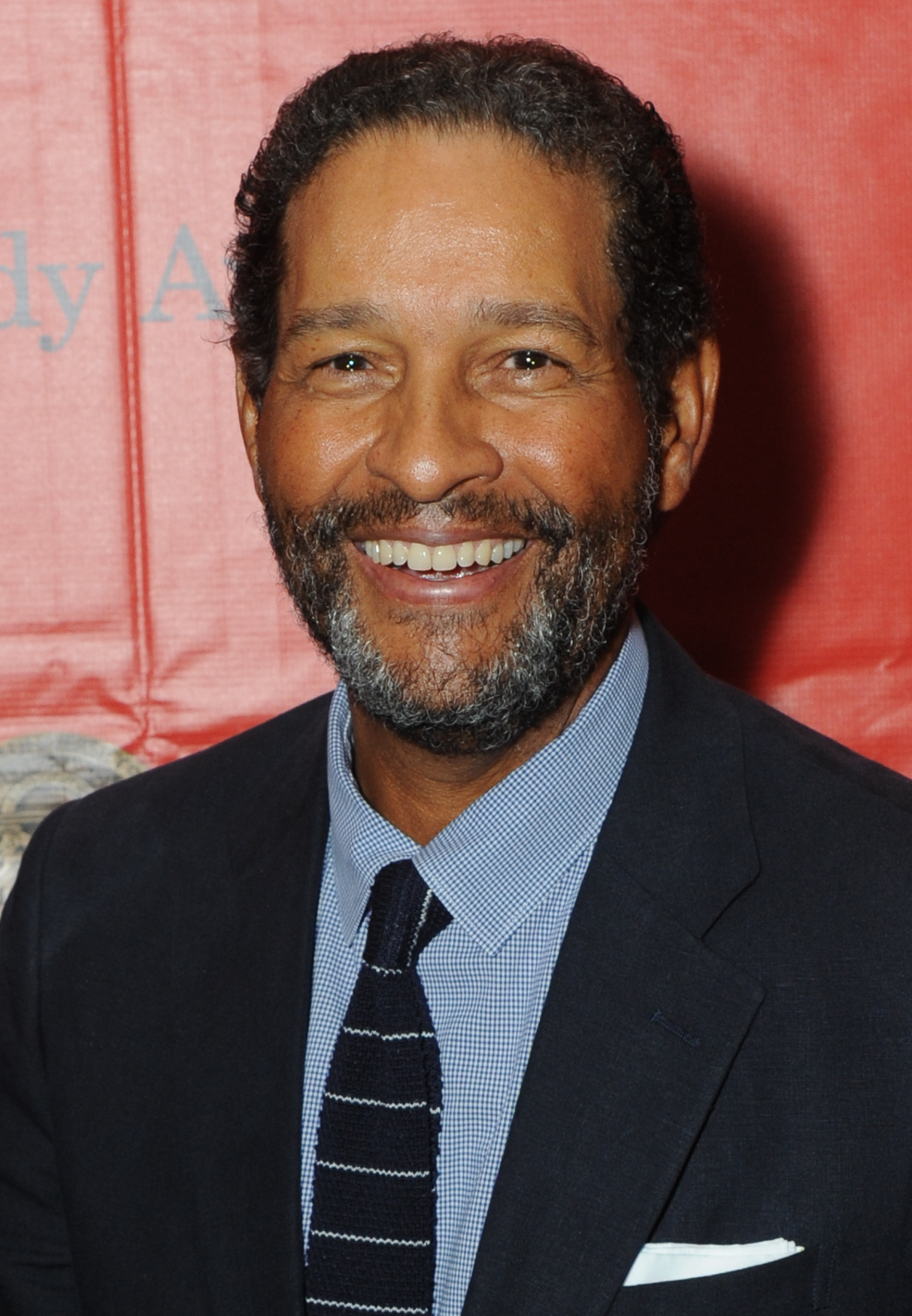
Bryant Gumbel, Lifetime Achievement Award recipient

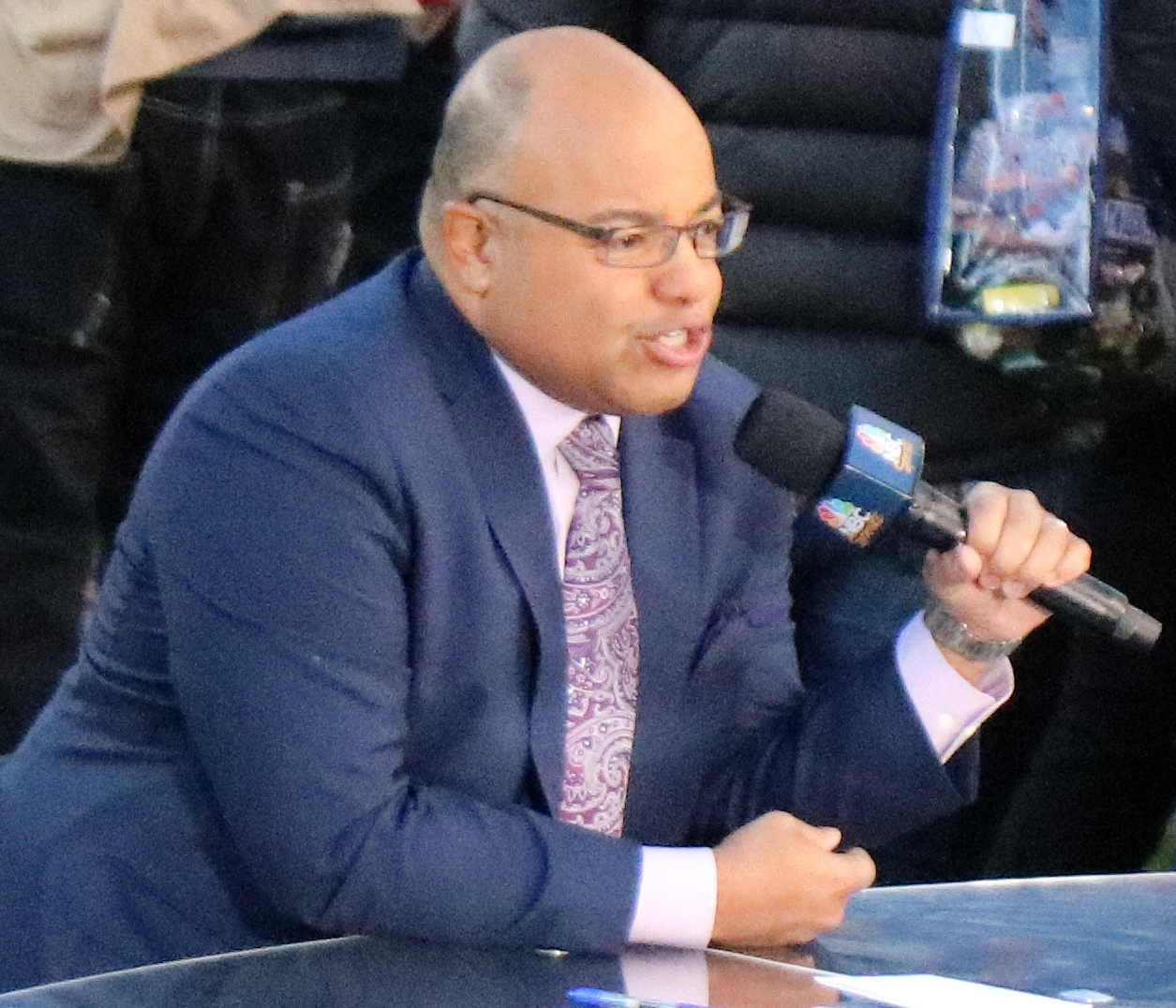
Mike Tirico, Outstanding Sports Personality/Studio Host winner

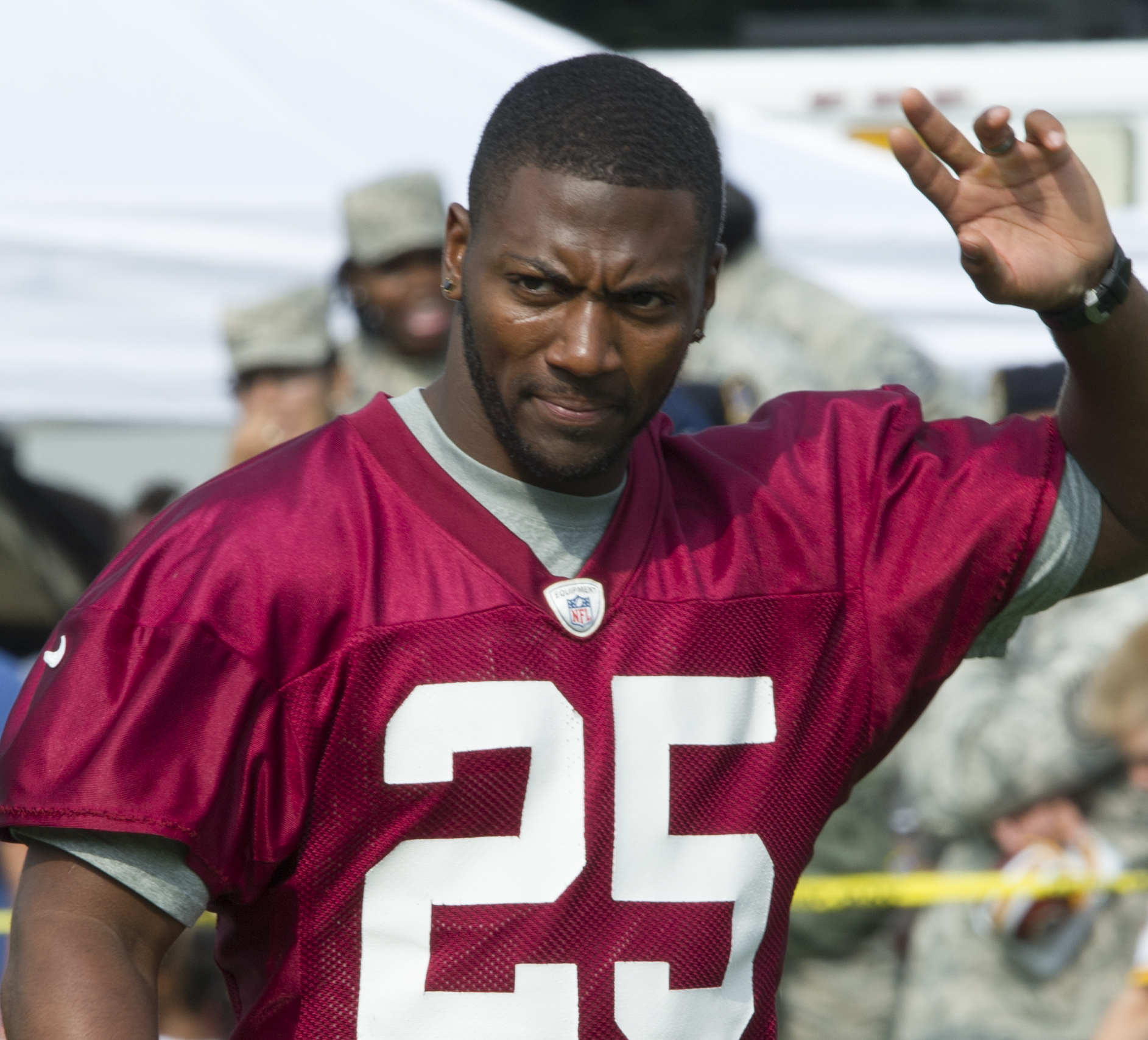
Ryan Clark, Outstanding Sports Personality/Studio Analyst winner

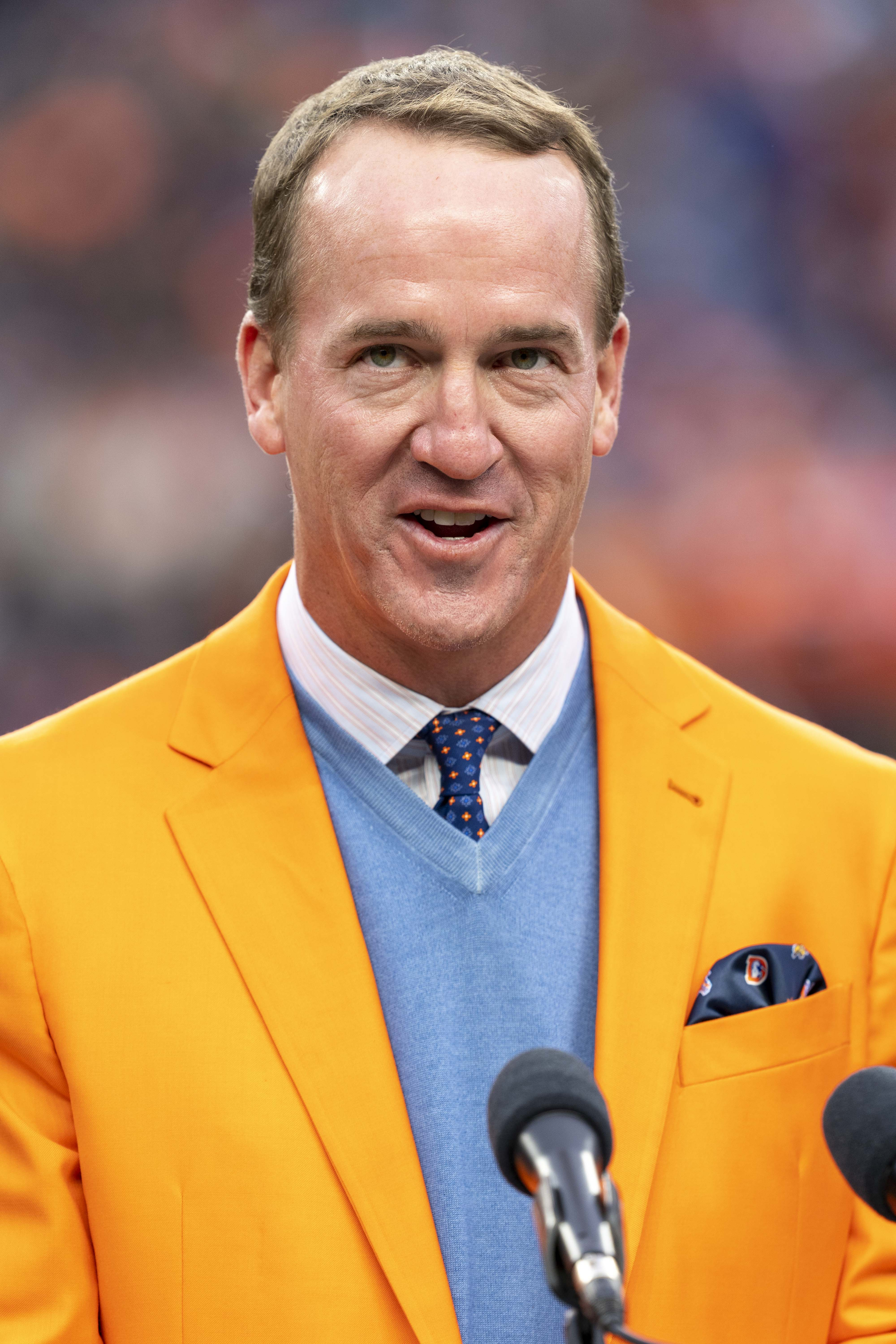
Peyton Manning, Outstanding Sports Personality/Sports Event Analyst winner

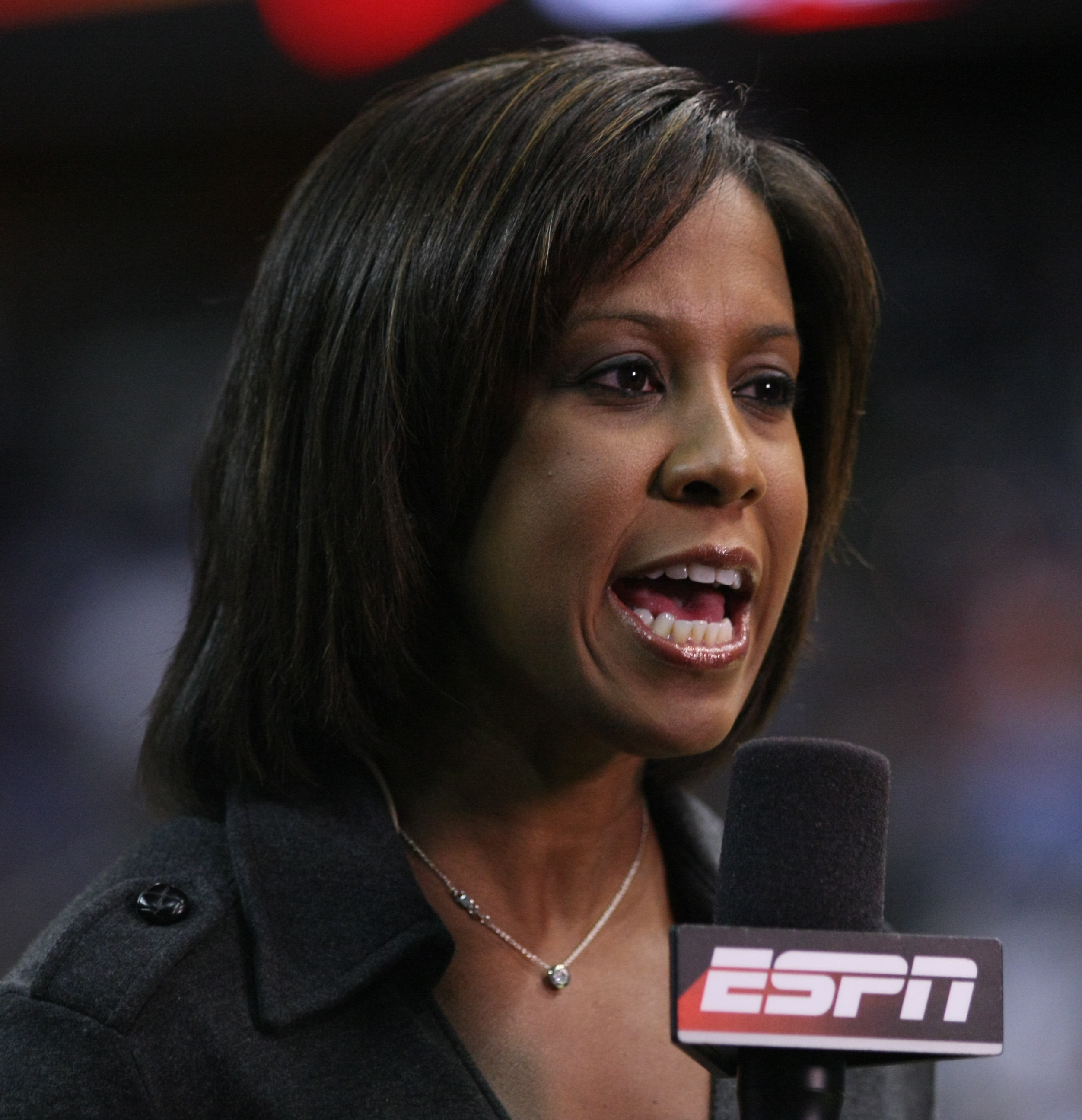
Lisa Salters, Outstanding Sports Personality/Sports Reporter winner

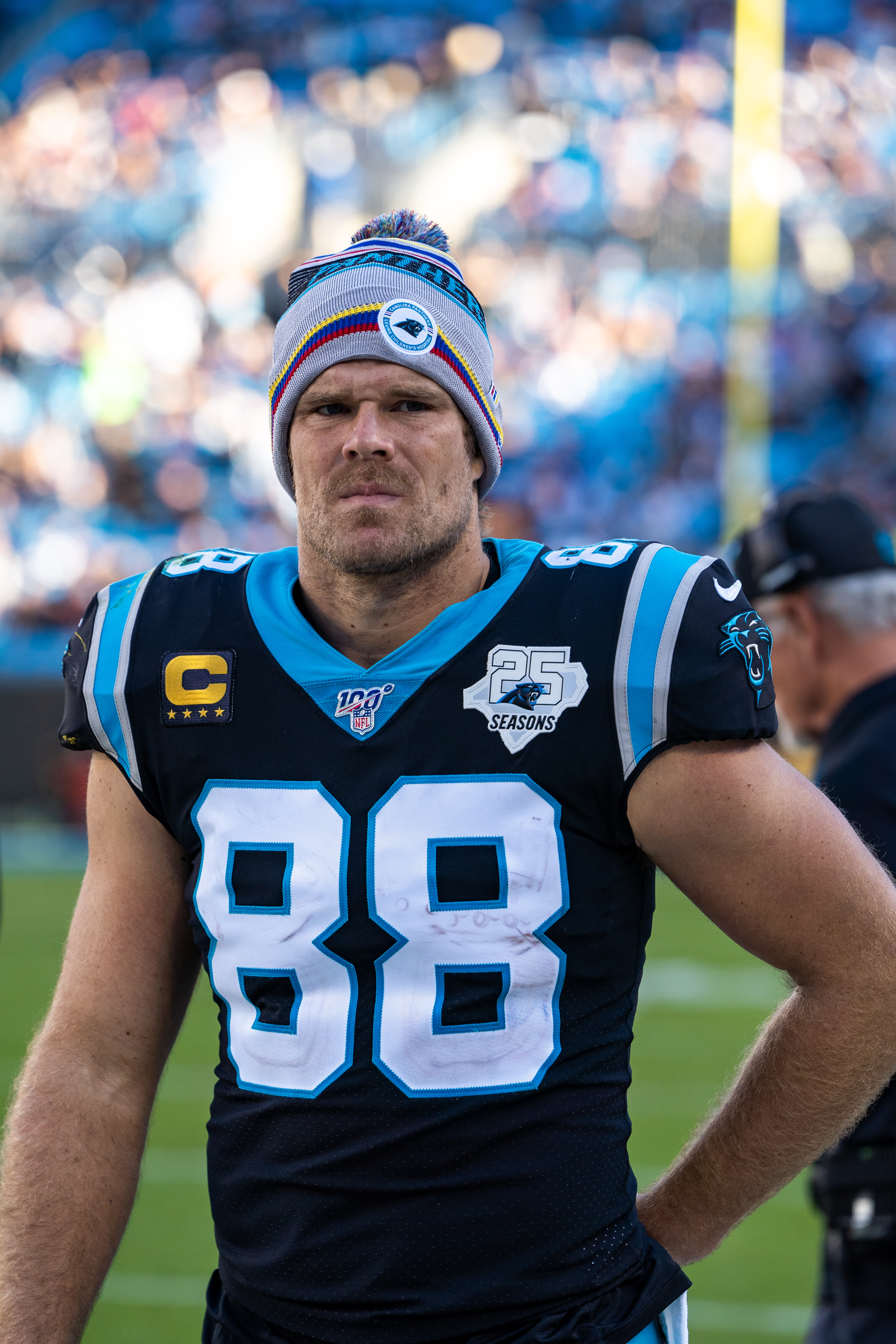
Greg Olsen, Outstanding Sports Personality/Emerging On-Air Talent winner

The nominees were announced on April 11, 2023. Winners are listed in bold and first.

=== Lifetime Achievement Award ===
- **Bryant Gumbel**

=== Programming ===
Outstanding Live Sports Special	Outstanding Live Sports Series
**XXIV Olympic Winter Games (NBC)**; 2022 FIFA World Cup Final: "Argentina vs France" (FOX); The 148th Kentucky Derby (NBC); MLB at Field of Dreams (FOX); Super Bowl LVII: "Kansas City Chiefs vs Philadelphia Eagles" (FOX); The 118th World Series: "Houston Astros vs Philadelphia Phillies" (FOX)	**Monday Night Football (ESPN)**; NFL on CBS (CBS); Saturday Night College Football (ESPN / ESPN2 / ABC); Sunday Night Football (NBC); Thursday Night Football (Prime Video)
Outstanding Playoff Coverage	Outstanding Edited Event Coverage
**NLCS: "San Diego Padres vs Philadelphia Phillies" (FOX / FS1)**; AFC Championship Game: "Cincinnati Bengals vs Kansas City Chiefs" (CBS); FedEx Cup Playoffs on NBC (NBC / Golf Channel); NHL on TNT (tbs / TNT); Sunday Night Football (NBC)	**Welcome to the NHL: 2022 NHL Draft (ESPN+ / NHL Network)**; All Access: "Davis vs Romero: Epilogue" (Showtime); Hey Rookie: Welcome to the NFL: "The 2022 NFL Draft" (ESPN); NFL Game Day All-Access: "Super Bowl LVII" (YouTube); Road to the Super Bowl (FOX)
Outstanding Edited Special	Outstanding Hosted Edited Series
**NFL 360: "The Indelible Legacy of Jimmy Raye" (NFL Network)**; Basketball Stories: "Sir Charles & The Doctor" (NBA TV); The Great Debate with Charles Barkley (TNT); NFL 360: "Women in Football" (NFL Network); SC Featured: "White Men Can't Jump: 30th Anniversary Special" (ESPN+); UFC Year of the Fighter: "Amanda Nunes" (UFC Fight Pass)	**Real Sports with Bryant Gumbel (HBO Max)**; E:60 (ESPN); Eli's Places (ESPN+); NFL 360 (NFL Network); The Shop: UNINTERRUPTED (YouTube)
Outstanding Esports Championship Coverage	Outstanding Short Documentary
**League of Legends Worlds 2022 Final: "T1 vs DRX" (LoLEsports.com / Twitch / YouTube)**; BLAST Premier Fall Final 2022 (BLAST.tv); 2022 Call of Duty League Championship Weekend: "Atlanta FaZe vs Los Angeles Thieves" (YouTube); The International 11 - Dota2 Championship: "Team Secret vs Tundra Esports" (Twitch / YouTube / Steam TV); VCT Champions 2022 Grand Final: "OpTic vs LOUD" (ValorantEsports.com / Twitch / YouTube)	**38 at the Garden (HBO Max)**; Fault Lines: "Bloodsport" (Al Jazeera English); Fightlore: "Mark Schultz's Ultimate Victory" (UFC Fight Pass); Hold Your Breath: The Ice Dive (Netflix); NBA on TNT: "Bill Russell: Answer the Call" (TNT)
Outstanding Long Documentary	Outstanding Documentary Series
**The Redeem Team (Netflix)**; After Jackie (History Channel); Citizen Ashe (CNN); NYC Point Gods (Showtime); Woooooo! Becoming Ric Flair (Peacock)	**Legacy: The True Story of the LA Lakers (Hulu)**; '72: A Gathering Of Champions (Olympics.com); Good Rivals (Prime Video); Meddling (NBC / Peacock); SHAQ (HBO Max)
Outstanding Documentary Series - Serialized	Outstanding Open/Tease
**Race: Bubba Wallace (Netflix)**; Coach Prime (Prime Video); Formula 1: Drive to Survive (Netflix); Hard Knocks: "Training Camp with the Detroit Lions" (HBO / HBO Max); Last Chance U (Netflix)	**2022 NCAA March Madness: "NOLA Vibes featuring Jon Batiste" (tbs / CBS / TNT / truTV)**; The 123rd Army-Navy Game: "It's a Family" (CBS); 2022 College Football Playoff National Championship: "Of Grit and Glory" (ESPN); US Open: "I Was Here" (ESPN); XXIV Olympic Winter Games: "The Ride of Their Lives" (NBC)
Outstanding Studio Show - Weekly	Outstanding Studio Show - Daily
**FOX NFL Sunday (FOX)**; College GameDay (ESPN); Inside the NBA (TNT); Monday Night Countdown (ESPN); NFL Slimetime (Nickelodeon)	**SportsCenter (ESPN)**; MLB Tonight (MLB Network); NFL Live (ESPN); Pardon the Interruption (ESPN); The Rich Eisen Show (Peacock / The Roku Channel)
Outstanding Studio Show - Limited Run	Outstanding Journalism
**Inside the NBA: "Playoffs" (TNT)**; FOX MLB: The Postseason (FOX / FS1); Postseason NFL Countdown (ESPN); Road to the Final Four (tbs / CBS / TNT / truTV); World Cup Today (FOX / FS1)	**E:60: "Remember the Blue and Yellow" (ESPN / ESPN+)**; E:60: "Qatar's World Cup" (ESPN); E:60: "The Survivor: The Remarkable Life of Shaul Ladany" (ESPN); NFL 360: "Who If Not Us" (NFL Network); Real Sports with Bryant Gumbel: "The IOC Way" (HBO Max)
Outstanding Short Feature	Outstanding Long Feature
**College GameDay: "Jump Around" (ESPN)**; Big Noon Kickoff: "A Mother's Love" (FOX); Ironman 70.3 World Championship: "Kyle Brown" (Outside TV); Sunday NFL Countdown: "Voodoo Doll-phins" (ESPN); Super Bowl LVII: "My Little Brother" (FOX)	**Betsy & Irv (ESPN+)**; Big Noon Kickoff: "Meechie" (FOX); NFL 360: "Kahuku Mana" (NFL Network); Real Sports with Bryant Gumbel: "Unstoppable: The Story of Kirstie Ennis" (HBO Max); SportsCenter: "SC Featured: Mind Over Matter" (ESPN); SportsCenter: "SC Featured: Seams to Heal" (ESPN)
Outstanding Studio Show in Spanish	Outstanding Feature Story in Spanish
**Copa Mundial de la FIFA Qatar 2022 (Telemundo)**; Debate Mundial (Telemundo); Hoy en La Copa (Telemundo); SportsCenter (ESPN Deportes); Sunday Night Football en Universo (Telemundo)	**Diana Flores: La Campeona de Nextitla (Mundo / NFL Social)**; Diana Flores Super Bowl Commercial Surprise (Mundo / NFL Social); Hoy en la Copa: "Raúl Jiménez: El Milagro" (Telemundo); SportsCenter: "SC Reportajes: Arraigado" (ESPN Deportes); SportsCenter: "SC Reportajes: The Real Deal" (ESPN Deportes); Un Tren a Qatar (ESPN Deportes)
Outstanding Interactive Experience - Event Coverage	Outstanding Interactive Experience - Original Programming
**Thursday Night Football: "TNF Optionality" (Prime Video)**; CFP National Championship MegaCast (ESPN / ESPN2 / ESPN Deportes / ESPNU / ESPNews / SEC Network / ESPN App / ABC); Fan Controlled Football (NBCLX / DAZN / Twitch / FuboTV); 2022 FIFA World Cup (FOX / FS1 / FOX Digital); XXIV Olympic Winter Games (NBC)	**NFL 360: "Who If Not Us" (NFL Network)**; House of Highlights: "Showdown: The Return of Dodgeball" (Bleacher Report); The Men in Blazers Show (Twitch); NHL on ESPN: "Ovechkin 800" (ESPN.com); World Cup Now (FOX Digital)
Outstanding Digital Innovation	Outstanding Promotional Announcement
**McEnroe vs McEnroe (ABC / ESPN / ESPN+)**; Fan Controlled Football (NBCLX / DAZN / Twitch / FuboTV); NBA App: "Reimagined" (NBA Digital); XXIV Olympic Winter Games: "The World's First Immersive 8K Livestream" (NBC); Thursday Night Football: "Prime Vision" (Prime Video)	**2022 FIFA World Cup: "Tis The FIFA World Cup Campaign" (FOX / FS1)**; Edge of the Earth: "Trailer" (HBO Max); NBA TV: "75 Years of Unpredictable", "Rivalry", "Wow" (NBA TV); XXIV Olympic Winter Games: "Jurassic" (NBC); Say Hey, Willie Mays!: "Trailer" (HBO Max)
Outstanding Public Service Content
**Super Bowl LVII: "Run With It" (FOX)**; An Unbreakable Spirit: "CBS Black History Month Campaign" (CBS / CBS Sports Network); Mental Health is Health: "Aaron Taylor" (CBS / CBS Sports Network); Mindset Series: "Solomon Thomas", "Megan Rapinoe", "Courtney Williams" (CBS Sports Network); #See Us: "CBS Sports LGBTQ Campaign" (CBS / CBS Sports Network)

=== Personality ===
Outstanding Sports Personality/Studio Host	Outstanding Sports Personality/Play-by-Play
**Mike Tirico (NBC / Golf Channel)**; James Brown (CBS / Paramount+); Rece Davis (ESPN / ESPN2 / ABC); Rich Eisen (NFL Network / Peacock / The Roku Channel); Scott Van Pelt (ESPN)	**Mike Breen (ABC)**; Kenny Albert (FOX / FS1 / NBC / TNT / tbs); Joe Buck (ESPN); Ian Eagle (tbs / CBS / TNT / truTV); Chris Fowler (ESPN / ESPN2 / ABC); Al Michaels (Prime Video); Mike Tirico (NBC)
Outstanding Sports Personality/Studio Analyst	Outstanding Sports Personality/Sports Event Analyst
**Ryan Clark (ESPN / ESPN2 / ABC)**; Charles Barkley (TNT); Jay Bilas (ESPN / ESPN2 / ABC); Nate Burleson (CBS / CBS Sports Network / Nickelodeon / NFL Network); Shaquille O'Neal (TNT); Kenny Smith (TNT); Tom Verducci (MLB Network)	**Peyton Manning (ESPN2 / ESPN+)**; Cris Collinsworth (NBC); Gary Danielson (CBS); Bill Raftery (tbs / CBS / TNT / truTV); John Smoltz (FOX / FS1)
Outstanding Sports Personality/Sports Reporter	Outstanding Sports Personality/Emerging On-Air Talent
**Lisa Salters (ESPN / ABC)**; Molly McGrath (ESPN / ESPN2 / ABC); Tom Rinaldi (FOX / FS1); Holly Rowe (ESPN / ESPN2 / ABC); Melissa Stark (NBC)	**Greg Olsen (FOX)**; Andraya Carter (ESPN / ESPN2 / ABC / SEC Network); Robert Griffin III (ESPN); Eli Manning (ESPN2 / ESPN+); JJ Redick (ESPN / ESPN2 / ABC)
Outstanding On-Air Personality in Spanish
**Andrés Cantor (Telemundo)**; Rolando Cantú (Telemundo); Lindsay Casinelli (Univision / TUDN); Carolina Guillén (ESPN Deportes); Miguel Gurwitz (Telemundo); Pilar Pérez (ESPN Deportes)

=== Technical ===
Outstanding Technical Team Event	Outstanding Technical Team Studio
**XXIV Olympic Winter Games (NBC)**; 2022 FIFA World Cup (FOX / FS1); The Masters (CBS); Monday Night Football (ESPN); Super Bowl LVII (FOX)	**2022 FIFA World Cup (FOX / FS1)**; College GameDay (ESPN); FOX NFL Sunday (FOX); NFL Draft (ESPN / ABC); XXIV Olympic Winter Games (NBC)
Outstanding Camera Work - Short Form	Outstanding Camera Work - Long Form
The Dragon – Will Roegge, Darryl Cannon, Austin Gager, Collin Harrington, Josh Herron, Matt Johnston, Johnny Schaer, Justin Shreeve (YouTube); The 148th Kentucky Derby (NBC); NFL 360: "See It Through" (NFL Network); The Nonstop NBA (NBA Social); Super Bowl LVII: "Ragged Old Flag: An American Chorus" (FOX)	**Meddling – Logan Fulton, Paul Steinberg (NBC / Peacock)**; Edge of the Earth (HBO Max); Hold Your Breath: The Ice Dive (Netflix); NFL 360: "Kahuku Mana" (NFL Network); NFL 360: "NFL Africa: The Journey" (NFL Network); Race to Miami (Red Bull TV)
Outstanding Editing - Short Forn	Outstanding Editing - Long Form
**Outside the Lines: "Without You" – Stephanie Yang (ESPN)**; The 123rd Army-Navy Game: "It's a Family" (CBS); Monday Night Football: "Teases" (ESPN / ABC); 2022 NCAA March Madness: "NOLA Vibes featuring Jon Batiste" (tbs / CBS / TNT / truTV); XXIV Olympic Winter Games: "Titans" (NBC)	**McEnroe – Steve Williams (Showtime)**; 38 at the Garden (HBO Max); 2022 NCAA March Madness: "Coach K Final Four Tribute" (tbs / CBS / TNT / truTV); The Redeem Team (Netflix); SHAQ (HBO Max)
Outstanding Music Direction	Outstanding Studio or Production Design/Art Direction
**Super Bowl LVII: "Ragged Old Flag: An American Chorus" – Shams Ahmed, Adam Greenberg, Stephanie Lopez, Rachel Neueck, Ed Boyer, Chris Cyronek, Ron Eaton, Eric Getzoff, Fletcher Sheridan, Ben Bram, Scott Hoying (FOX)**; 2022 College Football Playoff National Championship: "Of Grit and Glory" (ESPN); McEnroe (Showtime); 2022 NCAA March Madness: "NOLA Vibes featuring Jon Batiste" (tbs / CBS / TNT / truTV); NFL 360: "Who If Not Us" (NFL Network); Say Hey, Willie Mays! (HBO Max)	**2022 FIFA World Cup: "Doha Set" – Gary Hartley, Johnny Chou, Rod Conti, Michael Croxton, John Paul Diodati, Zac Fields, Rita Franklin, Grant Hall, Patty Kiley, Helen Kim, Gary Koopsen, Andres Lopez, Yssa Mitra, Joshua Perea, Lebraun Robinson, Nate Samanns, Eric Sherwood, Halle Watson, Marco Bacich, Nick Dinapoli, Michael Dolan (FOX / FS1)**; 2022 NCAA March Madness: "Coach K Final Four Tribute" (tbs / CBS / TNT / truTV); 2022 NCAA March Madness: "NOLA Vibes featuring Jon Batiste" (tbs / CBS / TNT / truTV); NFL Slimetime (Nickelodeon); The Nonstop NBA (NBA Social); Playoffs on NBA Lane (NBA Social)
Outstanding Audio/Sound - Live Event	Outstanding Audio/Sound - Post-Produced
**XXIV Olympic Winter Games – Audio Team (Note: Senior Audio Engineers: Richard Bernier, Al Craig, Brian Dicrescenzo, Michael Dicrescenzo, Fredrick, Domenigoni, Nuno Duarte, Timothy Dunn, Fred Hedemark, Benjamin Majchrzak, Greg Malenovsky, Karl Malone, Stephen Miller, Michael Moran, Ryan O'Gorman, Eric Paige, Randy Pekich, Jayson Polansky, Stephen Ross, James Starzynski, AJjay Vij; Audio Engineers: Stephan Ahonen, Daniel Beigel, Daniel Bouza, Patrick Brady, Matthew Burke, Davin Clem, Korey Evans, James Fieldson, Patrick Flynn, Leon Frank, Jeremy Katz, Michael Kramer, Joshua Miller, Fawzi Nijem, Luke Phillips, Timothy Pogorzala, Levi Radcliffe, Richard Rahner, Duncan Richards, Kristine Rothwell, Natalie Sigmon, Orin Smith, John Steigerwald, Glenn Stilwell, Dale Tong, Chan Wai Hang, Colin Whitehill, David Wolcott, Alina Wong) (NBC / USA)**; FOX NFL (FOX); Friday Night Baseball (Apple TV+); NASCAR on NBC (NBC / USA); US Open (ESPN)	**2022 NCAA March Madness: "NOLA Vibes featuring Jon Batiste" – Gilad Avnant, Daniel Cahill, Stav Nahum (tbs / CBS / TNT / truTV)**; Formula 1: Drive to Survive (Netflix); La Liste: Everything or Nothing (Prime Video); Race to Miami (Red Bull TV); Road to the Super Bowl (FOX)
Outstanding Graphic Design - Event/Show	Outstanding Graphic Design - Specialty
**XXIV Olympic & Paralympic Winter Games – Graphic Design Team (Note: Senior Graphic Designers: David Barton, Wade Echer, Chad Hudson, Mark Levy, David Melfi; Graphic Designers: Bianca Beck, Stephen Belmont, Jonathan Berry, Alex Boccard, Ian Bonilla, Eric Brown, Christopher Brown, Selena Cohen, Robert Cordle, James Coulson, Terry Daily, Joshua Davis, Kenneth Dayhoff, J.marty Dormany, Christie Grams, Shawn Hendrickson, Michael Kerner, Catherine Krebs, Jennifer Lorentz, Random Luttrell, Raymond Martinez, Christian Odar, David Robbins, Jeffrey Smalls, Bridget Smith, Ann Adele Smith, Tyler Stocker, Mark Stroming, Stefanie Toigo, Jessica Torrico, Daniel Velez, Vincent Velez, Masahiro Wakabayashi, Nanzi Wang, Bradley Wasilition, Kristy Weir, Emma Wiatrzyk, Noah Woode, Tim Woulle, Chung Wu, Anna Zavorina.) (NBC / USA / CNBC / Peacock / Twitter / NBCOlympics.com)**; 2022 FIFA World Cup (FOX / FS1); NBA on ESPN (ESPN / ABC); NFL Exclusive Games (NFL Network); Nickelodeon NFL Nickmas Game: "Denver Broncos vs LA Rams" (Nickelodeon)	**Greatness Code – Orlando Salva, Lauren Fisher, Ming Wang, Natalie Eagan, Emily Eckstein, Brown Yoon (Apple TV+)**; 38 at the Garden (HBO Max); McEnroe (Showtime); The Portal (Bleacher Report); Thursday Night Football: "Opening Titles" (Prime Video)
The Dick Schaap Outstanding Writing Award Short Form	Outstanding Writing Award Long Form
**Outside the Lines: "Without You" – Julian Gooden Sr, Marcia McKenna (ESPN)**; 2022 FIFA World Cup: "Chaos and Order", "Colors", "Messi/Mbappe" (FOX / FS1); 2022 NCAA March Madness: "The Commencement" (tbs / CBS / TNT / truTV); The NFL Today: "Kyle Brandt Series" (CBS); The 150th Open: "Teases" (NBC)	**RIVALS: Ohio State vs Michigan – Peter Karl (Sinclair Broadcast Group)**; All Access: "Spence vs Ugas" (Showtime); E:60: "The Survivor: The Remarkable Life of Shaul Ladany" (ESPN); NFL Films Presents: "Joe and the Magic Bean 2.0" (FS1); Yankees-Dodgers: An Uncivil War (ESPN)
The George Wensel Technical Achievement Award
**FOX NFL Sunday: "FOX Sports Live MULTICAM XR Set" – Stype Cajic, Zac Fields, Zac Fields, Hanna Frangiyyeh, Amir Keren, Joshua McVey, Daryl Moore, Alex Seflinger, Ronny Van Den Bergh, Borna Vukorepa (FOX)**; The International 11 - Dota2 Championship: "Multicam XR Premium" (Twitch / YouTube / Steam TV); NHL Broadcasts: "Digitally Enhanced Dasher Boards" (ESPN / ABC / TNT / tbs / NHL Network); Nickelodeon NFL Nickmas Game: "An Unreal Nickmas" (Nickelodeon); XXIV Olympic Winter Games: "Rewiring the Olympics" (NBC)

== Multiple wins ==
Wins that received multiple nominations
Wins	Show	Network
3	2022 FIFA World Cup	FOX / FS1; FOX Digital
3	XXIV Olympic Winter Games	NBC / USA
2	2022 NCAA March Madness	tbs / CBS; TNT / truTV
2	FOX NFL Sunday	FOX
2	NFL 360	NFL Network
2	Outside the Lines	ESPN
2	Super Bowl LVII	FOX

Wins by Network/Network Group
Wins	Network/Network Group
13	ESPN (Note: Includes ESPN, ESPN2, ESPN+, ESPN Deportes, ESPNU, ESPNews, SEC Network, ESPN App and ABC.)
9	FOX Sports (Note: Includes FOX, FS1 and FOX Digital.)
8	NBC Sports (Note: Includes NBC, Golf Channel, USA, CNBC, Peacock, NBCOlympics.com and NBCLX.)
3	NFL Network (Note: Includes NFL Network, Mundo and NFL Social.)
3	Turner Sports (Note: Includes TNT, tbs, truTV, NBA TV, Bleacher Report and CNN.)
2	CBS Sports (Note: Includes CBS, CBS Sports Network, Paramount+ and Nickelodeon.)
2	HBO Sports (Note: Includes HBO and HBO Max.)
2	Netflix
2	YouTube

== Multiple nominations ==
Shows that received multiple nominations
Nominations	Show	Network
10	NFL 360	NFL Network
10	XXIV Olympic Winter Games	NBC / USA
8	2022 NCAA March Madness	tbs / CBS; TNT / truTV
7	2022 FIFA World Cup	FOX / FS1; FOX Digital
6	SportsCenter	ESPN / ESPN Deportes
6	Super Bowl LVII	FOX
5	E:60	ESPN / ESPN+
4	Thursday Night Football	Prime Video
3	38 at the Garden	HBO Max
3	College GameDay	ESPN
3	Outside the Lines	ESPN
3	US Open	ESPN
3	FOX NFL Sunday	FOX
3	McEnroe	Showtime
3	All Access	Showtime
3	Monday Night Football	ESPN / ABC
2	2022 College Football Playoff National Championship	ESPN
2	Edge of the Earth	HBO Max
2	Say Hey, Willie Mays!	HBO Max
2	SHAQ	HBO Max
2	The 123rd Army-Navy Game	CBS
2	Big Noon Kickoff	FOX
2	Road to the Super Bowl	FOX
2	Formula 1: Drive to Survive	Netflix
2	Hold Your Breath: The Ice Dive	Netflix
2	The Redeem Team	Netflix
2	Fan Controlled Football	NBCLX / DAZN; Twitch / FuboTV
2	Hoy en La Copa	Telemundo
2	The International 11 - Dota2 Championship	Twitch / YouTube; Steam TV
2	The 148th Kentucky Derby	NBC
2	Sunday Night Football	NBC
2	Meddling	NBC / Peacock
2	NFL Slimetime	Nickelodeon
2	Nickelodeon NFL Nickmas Game	Nickelodeon
2	The Nonstop	NBA Social
2	Race to Miami	Red Bull TV

Nominations by Network/Betwork Group
Nominations	Network/Network Group
59	ESPN
38	NBC Sports
33	FOX Sports
29	CBS Sports
26	Turner Sports
15	NFL Network (Note: Includes NFL Network, Mundo and NFL Social.)
13	HBO Sports
8	Prime Video
8	Netflix
8	YouTube
7	Twitch
6	Showtime
4	MLB (Note: Includes MLB Network and NHL Network.)
4	NBA Digital
2	Apple TV+
2	DAZN
2	FuboTV
2	Red Bull TV
2	Steam TV
2	The Roku Channel
2	UFC Fight Pass
