= 28th Sports Emmy Awards =

- Date: April 30, 2007
- Location: Frederick P. Rose Hall, Jazz at Lincoln Center, New York City

The 28th Sports Emmy Awards honoring American sports coverage in 2006 were presented on April 30, 2007 at Frederick P. Rose Hall in the Jazz at Lincoln Center, New York City. The nominees were announced on March 22.

== Nominations ==
Winners are in bold

Outstanding Live Sports Special

- 131st Preakness Stakes - NBC
- 2006 FIFA World Cup - ABC
- **2006 Major League Baseball postseason - Fox Sports**
- NFL Wild Card Playoff: Pittsburgh vs. Indianapolis - CBS
- 2006 Masters Tournament - CBS

Outstanding Live Sports Series

- ESPN College Football
- ESPN Major League Baseball
- Monday Night Football
- HBO Boxing
- **NASCAR on TNT/NASCAR on NBC**

Outstanding Studio Show - Weekly

- College Gameday
- Inside the NFL
- NBA Nation
- **Sunday NFL Countdown**
- The NFL Today

Outstanding Studio Show - Daily

- Baseball Tonight
- **Inside the NBA**
- Olympic Ice
- Outside the Lines
- Pardon the Interruption

Outstanding Sports Personality, Studio Host

- Bob Costas
- **Ernie Johnson, Jr.**
- James Brown
- Jim Lampley
- Joe Buck
- Rich Eisen

Outstanding Sports Personality, Play-by-Play

- **Al Michaels**
- Jim Nantz
- Joe Buck
- Marv Albert
- Mike Tirico

Outstanding Sports Personality, Studio Analyst

- Charles Barkley
- **Cris Collinsworth**
- Jay Bilas
- Jeff Hammond
- Kirk Herbstreit

Outstanding Sports Personality, Sports Event Analyst

- **Cris Collinsworth**
- Darrell Waltrip
- Jerry Bailey
- Johnny Miller
- Tim McCarver

Outstanding Camera Work

- **Jeep World of Adventure Sports - NBC Camerapersons: Brett Lowell, Josh Lowell**
- Cinderella Man: The James J. Braddock Story - ESPN2 Red Line Films
- ESPN Sunday Night Football - ESPN Teases
- Timeless - ESPN 2 Red Line Films
- X Games Eleven - ABC Surfing - ESPN Productions

Outstanding Live Event Audio/Sound

- ESPN Sunday Night Baseball - ESPN
- Great Outdoor Games - ESPN
- HBO World Championship Boxing - HBO
- NASCAR on FOX - FOX

Outstanding Sports Journalism

- Real Sports with Bryant Gumbel - HBO
- Real Sports with Bryant Gumbel - HBO
- SportsCenter - ESPN

Outstanding Open/Tease

- Little League World Series - ABC
- NFL on FOX: Super Bowl XXXIX - FOX
- Winter Gravity Games - OLN
- World Figure Skating Championships - ESPN

Outstanding Sports Documentary

- Dare to Dream: The Story of the U.S. Women’s Soccer Team - HBO
- Mantle - HBO
- Perfect Upset - HBO
- Rhythm in the Rope - ESPN2
- You Write Better Than You Play: The Frank Deford Story - ESPN Classic

Sports Lifetime Achievement Award

- **Don Ohlmeyer**
