= 45th Sports Emmy Awards =

- Date: May 21, 2024
- Location: Jazz at Lincoln Center's Frederick P. Rose Hall, New York City
- Most awards: Super Bowl LVIII; Toy Story Funday Football (3)
- Most nominations: NFL 360 (11)

The 45th Sports Emmy Awards were presented by the National Academy of Television Arts and Sciences (NATAS), honoring the best in American sports television coverage in 2023. The ceremony took place in-person at the Jazz at Lincoln Center's Frederick P. Rose Hall in New York City on Tuesday, May 21, 2024.

The nominations were announced on April 9, 2024. ESPN received the most nominations with 49, while NFL 360 was the most nominated program, with 11 nominations. American journalist and sportcaster James Brown was honored with the Sports Lifetime Achievement Award.

The coverage for Super Bowl LVIII and Toy Story Funday Football were the most awarded programs with three wins. The ESPN and CBS Networks tied with the most awards with 7 wins each.

== Winners and nominees ==
The nominees were announced on April 9, 2024. Winners were announced on May 21, 2024 and are listed in bold.

=== Lifetime Achievement Award ===
- James Brown

=== Programming ===
Outstanding Live Sports Special	Outstanding Live Sports Series
**Super Bowl LVIII: "Kansas City Chiefs vs San Francisco 49ers" (CBS)**; The Masters (CBS); The 105th PGA Championship (CBS); Super Bowl LVIII: "Live from Bikini Bottom" (Nickelodeon); The 119th World Series: "Texas Rangers vs Arizona Diamondbacks" (FOX)	**Monday Night Football with Peyton & Eli** **(ESPN2)**; FOX CFB (FOX / FS1); NFL on FOX (FOX); Monday Night Football (ESPN / ABC); Sunday Night Football (NBC / Peacock)
Outstanding Playoff Coverage	Outstanding Edited Event Coverage
**ALCS: "Houston Astros vs Texas Rangers" (FOX / FS1)**; College Football Playoff Semifinals "Rose Bowl & Sugar Bowl" (ESPN); MLB Postseason on tbs (tbs); NFC Championship Game: "Detroit Lions vs San Francisco 49ers" (FOX); NFL Playoffs on NBC (NBC / Peacock)	**NFL Game Day All-Access: "Super Bowl LVIII" (YouTube)**; All Access: "Davis vs Garcia: Epilogue" (Showtime); NFL Draft: The Pick Is In (The Roku Channel); Road to the Super Bowl (CBS); 2023 Special Olympics World Games (ABC)
Outstanding Edited Special	Outstanding Hosted Edited Series
**"You Are Looking Live!" (CBS / Paramount+)**; Chasing Greatness: Coach K x LeBron (TNT); Crown (CBS Sports Network); E:60: "The Crossover: 50 Years of Hip Hop and Sports" (ESPN); GR8TNESS (ESPN)	**Real Sports with Bryant Gumbel (HBO / Max)**; E:60 (ESPN); Kickin' It (CBS Sports Golazo Network); The Pivot Podcast (YouTube); The Shop: UNINTERRUPTED (YouTube)
Outstanding Esports Championship Coverage	Outstanding Short Documentary
**League of Legends Worlds 2023 Final: "T1 vs Weibo Gaming" (LoLEsports.com / Twitch / YouTube)**; BLAST.tv Paris Major 2023 (BLAST.tv); 2023 Call of Duty League Championship Weekend: "New York Subliners vs Toronto Ultra" (Twitch / YouTube); Intel Extreme Masters Cologne 2023 Grand Finals: "ENCE vs G2" (Twitch / YouTube); VALORANT Champions 2023 Grand Final: "Paper Rex vs Evil Geniuses" (ValorantEsports.com / Twitch / YouTube)	**Extraordinary Stories: "One-Armed Wonder: The Extraordinary Story of Jimmy Hasty" (UEFA.tv)**; Dreamcaster (MSG Network); NFL 360: "Gone" (NFL Network); NFL Films Presents: "Lahainaluna High" (FS1); SC Featured: "Nothing Else Matters" (ESPN+)
Outstanding Long Documentary	Outstanding Documentary Series
**The Deepest Breath (Netflix)**; Full Circle (Vimeo); Kelce (Prime Video); The Saint of Second Chances (Netflix); Stand (Showtime)	**Super League: The War for Football (Apple TV+)**; Catching Lightning (Showtime); Goliath (Showtime); Untold (Netflix)
Outstanding Documentary Series - Serialized	Outstanding Studio Show - Weekly
**Football Must Go On (Paramount+)**; Formula 1: Drive to Survive (Netflix); Hard Knocks: "Training Camp with the New York Jets" (HBO / Max); Monster Factory (Apple TV+); Quarterback (Netflix)	**College GameDay (ESPN)**; FOX CFB: Big Noon Kickoff (FOX / FS1); FOX NFL Sunday (FOX); Inside the NBA (TNT); The NFL Today (CBS)
Outstanding Studio Show - Daily	Outstanding Studio Show - Limited Run
**MLB Tonight (MLB Network)**; NBA Countdown (ESPN / ESPN2); NFL Live (ESPN / ESPN2); Pardon the Interruption (ESPN); SportsCenter (ESPN)	**Inside the NBA: "Playoffs" (TNT)**; College GameDay: "College Football Playoff" (ESPN); FOX MLB: The Postseason (FOX / FS1); Postseason NFL Countdown (ESPN); Road to the Final Four (CBS / TNT)
Outstanding Journalism	Outstanding Short Feature
**Real Sports with Bryant Gumbel: "Call of Duty: How War is Destroying Ukrainian Sport" (HBO / Max)**; CNN FlashDocs: "Blindsided" (CNN); E:60: "Peace of Mind: Psychedelics in Sports" (ESPN); E:60: "The Perfect Machine" (ESPN); Real Sports with Bryant Gumbel: "A Blind Eye: Switzerland and the Corruption of World Sport" (HBO / Max)	**NFL 360: "Heroes" (NFL Network)**; College GameDay: "The Legacy of Tyler Trent" (ESPN); NFL 360: "The Chief Who Walked The Sea" (NFL Network); NFL 360: "Miracles" (NFL Network); The NFL Today: Super Bowl LVIII: "Just Win Baby!" (CBS); Sunday Night Football: "Madden & Stingley" (NBC / Peacock); Thursday Night Football: "Marshawn Lynch ‘N Yo City: Intercourse, PA (Yes, this is a real place)" (Prime Video)
Outstanding Long Feature	Outstanding Open/Tease
**Unredeemable** **(Golf Channel)**; Outside The Lines: "Jordan McNair: The Freedom Within" (ESPN); Playing Fields: "Ornella: Knocking Down Social Prejudices Pursuing Her Olympic Dream" (Olympic Channel); Real Sports with Bryant Gumbel: "No Surrender: One Man’s Battle with ALS" (HBO / Max); SportsCenter: "SC Featured: Dear Mrs. Reid" (ESPN); SportsCenter: "SC Featured: Running for Martin" (ESPN)	**Super Bowl LVIII: "My Way" (CBS)**; The 149th Kentucky Derby: "Timeless" (NBC / Peacock); Monday Night Football: "In the Air Tonight" (ESPN / ABC); NHL Winter Classic on TNT: "If This Wall Could Talk" (TNT); Sunday Night Football: "Heidi" (NBC / Peacock)
Outstanding Interactive Experience	Outstanding Digital Innovation
**Thursday Night Football: "TNF Optionality" (Prime Video)**; CFP Rose Bowl Game MegaCast (ESPN / ABC / ESPN2 / ESPN Deportes / ESPNU / ESPNews / SEC Network / ESPN App / Longhorn Network); Fan Controlled Racing Watch Party (Twitch / KICK); The Magic and Mastery of US Open Champion - Carlos Alcaraz (ESPN.com); NCAA March Madness Live (March Madness Live); Thursday Night Football: "Black Friday Football" (Prime Video)	**Dreamcaster (MSG Network)**; Big City Greens Classic: "Fully Animated Live Sporting Event With Integrated Real-Time Animated Talent" (ESPN+ / Disney Channel / Disney XD / Disney+); MLB Next: "AR App" (MLB); Red Bull Erzbergrodeo: "Cross-Platform Storytelling with Broadcast, Web Widgets and AR App" (Red Bull TV); Thursday Night Football: "Machine Learning on Prime Vision" (Prime Video)
Outstanding Promotional Announcement	Outstanding Public Service Content
**Top Rank Boxing on ESPN: "Battle of the Baddest" (ESPN / ESPN+)**; FIFA Women's World Cup 2023: "USA vs The World" (FOX); The Golden Boy: "Who Am I?" (HBO / Max); 2023 NBA Finals: "We Are All in the Finals" (NBA Social); 2023 Stanley Cup: "First Kiss" (NHL Network)	**Notre Dame Football: "What Would You Fight For?" (NBC)**; FIFA Women's World Cup 2023: "Common Goal" (FOX / FS1); Hometown Hopefuls (NBC / NBCSports.com); NFL on CBS: "Football for Everyone" (CBS / CBS Sports Network); Youth Flag Football: "Let's Play" (NFL Network)
Outstanding Studio Show in Spanish	Outstanding Feature Story in Spanish
**Copa Mundial Femenina de la FIFA 2023 (Telemundo / Peacock)**; Ahora o Nunca (ESPN Deportes); Fuera de Juego (ESPN+); Futbol Central: "Verano de Campeones" (Univision / TUDN); Republica Deportiva (Univision / TUDN); Sunday Night Football en Universo (Telemundo)	**Mundo NFL Originals: "El Sueño de Cieneguitas" (Mundo / NFL Social)**; Balon de Oro de la Liga MX: "Tigres - Powerchair" (Univision / TUDN); E:60: "Mayra" (ESPN / ESPN+); SportsCenter: "In Her Shoes: Wang Shuang" (ESPN Deportes); SportsCenter: "SC Reportajes: Do Bronx - Charles Oliveira" (ESPN Deportes)

=== Personality ===
Outstanding Personality/Studio Host	Outstanding Personality/Play-by-Play
**Ernie Johnson (TNT / tbs)**; Malika Andrews (ESPN / ABC / ESPN2 / TNT); Kevin Burkhardt (FOX / FS1); Rece Davis (ESPN / ABC / ESPN 2); Scott Van Pelt (ESPN / ABC / ESPN2)	**Mike Breen (ABC)**; Joe Buck (ESPN / ABC); Ian Eagle (CBS / TNT / tbs); Kevin Harlan (TNT / tbs / TruTV / CBS); Mike Tirico (NBC / Peacock)
Outstanding Personality/Studio Analyst	Outstanding Personality/Event Analyst
**Charles Barkley (TNT)**; Nate Burleson (CBS / Nickelodeon); Ryan Clark (ESPN / ABC / ESPN2 / ESPN+); Kirk Herbstreit (ESPN / Prime Video); Mina Kimes (ESPN / ABC / ESPN2)	**Greg Olsen (FOX)**; Troy Aikman (ESPN / ABC); Cris Collinsworth (NBC / Peacock); Bill Raftery (CBS / TNT / FOX); John Smoltz (FOX / FS1); Tom Verducci (FOX / FS1 / MLB Network)
Outstanding Personality/Sideline Reporter	Outstanding Personality/Emerging On-Air Talent
**Tracy Wolfson (CBS / TNT)**; Erin Andrews (FOX); Kaylee Hartung (Prime Video / NBC / Peacock); Tom Rinaldi (FOX / FS1); Holly Rowe (ESPN / ABC / ESPN2)	**Noah Eagle (NBC / Peacock / Nickelodeon)**; Mookie Betts (Bleacher Report / FOX / tbs); Carli Lloyd (FOX / FS1); Taylor Rooks (TNT / NBA TV / Bleacher Report / Prime Video); Jay Wright (CBS / CBS Sports Network / TNT)
Outstanding On-Air Personality in Spanish
**Andrés Cantor (Telemundo)**; Alejandro Berry (Univision / TUDN); Carolina Guillén (ESPN Deportes); Miguel Gurwitz (Telemundo); Rebeca Landa (ESPN Deportes); Valeria Marin (Univision / TUDN)

=== Technical ===
Outstanding Technical Team Event	Outstanding Technical Team Studio
**Super Bowl LVIII (CBS / Nickelodeon)**; The Masters (CBS); NASCAR on NBC: "Streets of Chicago" (NBC); Thursday Night Football (Prime Video); 2023 US Open (ESPN / ABC / ESPN2 / ESPN+)	**NFL Draft** **(ESPN / ABC)**; FIFA Women's World Cup 2023 (FOX / FS1); FOX NFL Sunday (FOX); The NFL Today: "Super Bowl LVIII" (CBS); Thursday Night Football (Prime Video)
Outstanding Camera Work - Short Form	Outstanding Camera Work - Long Form
**The NFL Today: Super Bowl LVIII: "Just Win Baby!" - Joyce Tsang, Oliver Anderson, Dakota Diel, Zachary Etzel, Robert McClelland, Jon Roche, Chris Vasquez (CBS)**; The 155th Belmont Stakes: "31 Lengths: Secretariat" (FOX); NFL 360: "Heroes" (NFL Network); NFL Films Presents: "Optex Lens" (FS1); Super Bowl LVIII: "My Way" (CBS)	**Descendance - Michael Haunschmidt, Matthias Kögel (YouTube - Legs of Steel)**; E:60: "Sacred Dog" (ESPN); Hard Knocks: "Training Camp With The New York Jets" (HBO / Max); Unredeemable (Golf Channel); Vamos Vegas (Red Bull TV)
Outstanding Editing - Short Forn	Outstanding Editing - Long Form
**NHL on TNT: "Show and Tell" - Brett Langefels (TNT)**; The 149th Kentucky Derby: "Timeless" (NBC / Peacock); NFL 360: "The Chief Who Walked The Sea" (NFL Network); NFL 360: "Heroes" (NFL Network); Super Bowl LVIII: "My Way" (CBS)	**Unredeemable** **- Matthew Durham, Todd Kapostasy, Michael Sanabria (Golf Channel)**; Descendance (YouTube - Legs of Steel); Hard Knocks: "Training Camp With The New York Jets" (HBO / Max); Kelce (Prime Video); Under Pressure: The U.S. Women’s World Cup Team (Netflix)
The Dick Schaap Outstanding Writing Award - Short Form	Outstanding Writing - Long Form
**NFL 360: "Still Here" - Jillian Hanesworth (NFL Network)**; FOX CFB: Big Noon Kickoff: "J.J. McCarthy '47'" (FOX); NFL 360: "The Chief Who Walked The Sea" (NFL Network); The NFL Today: "Kyle Brandt Series" (CBS); Sunday Night Football (NBC / Peacock)	**The World According to Football - Joe Opio (Showtime)**; All Access (Showtime); Chasing Gold: "Farebersviller" (NBC); E:60: "The Crossover: 50 Years of Hip Hop and Sports" (ESPN); Hard Knocks: "Training Camp With The New York Jets" (HBO / Max)
Outstanding Music Direction	Outstanding Audio/Sound - Live Event
**NBA on TNT: "50 Years of Hip Hop" - Brittany Hardy, Craig Murray, Drew Watkins, Jeffrey Townes (TNT)**; E:60: "The Crossover: 50 Years of Hip Hop and Sports" (ESPN); E:60: "Sacred Dog" (ESPN); The Golden Boy (HBO / Max); Super Bowl LVIII: "My Way" (CBS)	**NASCAR on FOX – Kevin McCloskey, Jeff Bratta, Jeff Feltz, Linal Getchel, Barb Hanford, Craig Lenox, Anthony Lomastro, Dan Masters, Jamie McCombs, Shawn Peacock, Andy Rostron, Harry Weaver, Doug Wilson (FOX / FS1)**; MLB on FOX (FOX / FS1); Little League World Series (ESPN / ABC / ESPN2); NASCAR on NBC (NBC / USA); Sunday Night Baseball (ESPN / ESPN2); Sunday Night Football (NBC / Peacock); Super Bowl LVIII (CBS)
Outstanding Audio/Sound - Post-Produced	Outstanding Graphic Design - Event/Show
**Vamos Vegas - John Fasal, Travis Prater, Ryan Ray, Landen Belardes, Nick Spradlin, Charles Deenen, James Evans (Red Bull TV)**; Formula 1: Drive to Survive (Netflix); FOX NASCAR: RACE HUB: "The Championship: Radioactive" (FS1); 2023 IRONMAN World Championship (Outside TV); McGregor Forever (Netflix); NFL 360: "Heroes" (NFL Network); Quarterback (Netflix)	**Toy Story Funday Football - Animation and Graphics Team (Disney+ / ESPN+)**; NFL on FOX (FOX / FS1); Monday Night Football (ESPN / ABC / ESPN2 / ESPN+); NBA Finals (ESPN / ABC); Super Bowl LVIII (CBS)
Outstanding Graphic Design - Specialty	Outstanding Studio or Production Design/Art Direction
**Super League: The War for Football - Graphics Team (Apple TV+)**; MLB Network Showcase: "This Is What I Live For" (MLB Network); NFL 360: "The Chief Who Walked The Sea" (NFL Network); Thursday Night Football: "TNF Show Open / Black Friday Football: Robert Randolph" (Prime Video); Toy Story Funday Football: "Duke Caboom Daredevil Spectacular" (Disney+ / ESPN+)	**Toy Story Funday Football** **- Creative Team (Disney+ / ESPN+)**; The 155th Belmont Stakes: "31 Lengths: Secretariat" (FOX); NFL on FOX: "Stage A" (FOX); Super Bowl LVIII: "My Way" (CBS); Thursday Night Football: "Black Friday Football Tradition Tease; TNF Show" (Prime Video)
The George Wensel Technical Achievement Award
**Toy Story Funday Football: "DragonFly Tech" - Innovation Team (Disney+ / ESPN+)**; 2023 MLB Home Run Derby: "StatCast Edition: Live Virtual 3D Event Coverage" (ESPN2); The Masters: "TFC Compound Connect" (CBS); Monday Night Football with Peyton & Eli: "Peyton Manning's AR Table" (ESPN2); Thursday Night Football: "TNF Table Talk" (Prime Video)

== Multiple wins ==
Shows and Events receiving multiple wins

Wins	Show / Event	Network
3	Super Bowl LVIII	CBS
3	Toy Story Funday Football	Disney+ / ESPN+
2	Real Sports with Bryant Gumbel	HBO / Max
2	Super League: The War for Football	Apple TV+
2	NFL 360	NFL Network
2	Unredeemable	Golf Channel

Network Groups receiving multiple wins

Wins	Network Group	Parent Company	Network Group includes:
7	ESPN	The Walt Disney Company	ESPN, ABC, ESPN2, ESPN+, ESPNU, ESPNews, ESPN App, ESPN Deportes, SEC Network, Longhorn Network, Disney Channel, Disney XD, Disney+
7	CBS	Paramount Global	CBS, CBS Sports Network, CBS Golazo Network, Paramount+, Nickelodeon, Showtime
4	NBC	NBCUniversal	NBC, USA Network, Golf Channel, Peacock, Telemundo
3	NFL Network	National Football League	NFL Network, Mundo, NFL Social
3	TNT	Warner Bros. Discovery	TNT, tbs, TruTV, Bleacher Report, NBA TV, CNN
2	Apple TV+	Apple Inc.	Apple TV+
2	FOX	Fox Corporation	FOX, FS1, Fox Deportes, FOX Digital
2	HBO	Warner Bros. Discovery	HBO, Max
2	YouTube	Google	YouTube

== Multiple nominations ==
Shows and Events receiving multiple nominations

Nominations	Show / Event	Network
11	NFL 360	NFL Network
10	Super Bowl LVIII	CBS / Nickelodeon
9	E:60	ESPN
9	Thursday Night Football	Prime Video
5	Sunday Night Football	NBC / Peacock
5	SportsCenter	ESPN
4	NFL on FOX	FOX / FS1
4	Hard Knocks	HBO / Max
4	Real Sports with Bryant Gumbel	HBO / Max
4	Toy Story Funday Football	Disney+ / ESPN+
3	College GameDay	ESPN
3	FIFA Women's World Cup 2023	FOX / FS1
3	Monday Night Football	ESPN / ABC / ESPN2 / ESPN+
3	The Masters	CBS
3	The NFL Today	CBS
3	Unredeemable	Golf Channel
2	All Access	Showtime
2	Dreamcaster	MSG Network
2	Formula 1: Drive to Survive	Netflix
2	FOX CFB: Big Noon Kickoff	FOX / FS1
2	Freeride Skiing	YouTube
2	Kelce	Prime Video
2	Monday Night Football with Peyton & Eli	ESPN2
2	NASCAR on NBC	NBC / USA
2	NFL Films Presents	FS1
2	Quarterback	Netflix
2	Super League: The War for Football	Apple TV+
2	The 149th Kentucky Derby	NBC / Peacock
2	The 155th Belmont Stakes	FOX
2	The Golden Boy	HBO / Max
2	The NFL Today: Super Bowl LVIII	CBS
2	Vamos Vegas	Red Bull TV

Network Groups receiving multiple nominations

Nominations	Network Group	Parent Company	Network Group includes:
49	ESPN	The Walt Disney Company	ESPN, ABC, ESPN2, ESPN+, ESPNU, ESPNews, ESPN App, ESPN Deportes, SEC Network, Longhorn Network, Disney Channel, Disney XD, Disney+
39	CBS	Paramount Global	CBS, CBS Sports Network, CBS Golazo Network, Paramount+, Nickelodeon, Showtime
31	FOX	Fox Corporation	FOX, FS1, Fox Deportes, FOX Digital
25	NBC	NBCUniversal	NBC, USA Network, Golf Channel, Peacock, Telemundo, Olympic Channel
19	TNT	Warner Bros. Discovery	TNT, tbs, TruTV, Bleacher Report, NBA TV, CNN
19	Prime Video	Amazon	Prime Video, Twitch
13	NFL Network	National Football League	NFL Network, Mundo, NFL Social
10	HBO	Warner Bros. Discovery	HBO, Max
9	YouTube	Google	YouTube
6	Netflix	Netflix Inc.	Netflix
5	Univision	TelevisaUnivision	Univision, TUDN
3	MLB Network	Major League Baseball	MLB Network
3	Apple TV+	Apple Inc.	Apple TV+
3	Red Bull TV	Red Bull	Red Bull TV
2	MSG Network	MSG Entertainment	MSG Network
