= Sports Emmy Awards =

Award for sports personalities

- Current: 47th Sports Emmy Awards
- Awarded for: Outstanding achievement in sports television coverage
- Website: Sports Emmy Awards

The Sports Emmy Awards, or Sports Emmys, are part of the extensive range of Emmy Awards for artistic and technical merit for the American television industry. Bestowed by the National Academy of Television Arts and Sciences (NATAS), the Sports Emmys are presented in recognition of excellence in American sports television programming, including sports-related series, live coverage of sporting events, and best sports announcers. The awards ceremony, presenting Emmys from the previous calendar year, is usually held on a Spring Monday night, sometime in the last two weeks in April or the first week in May. The Sports Emmy Awards are all given away at one ceremony, unlike the Primetime Emmy Awards and the Daytime Emmy Awards, which hold a "Creative Arts" ceremony in which Emmys are given to behind-the-scenes personnel.

== History ==
The first Emmy for "Best Sports Coverage" was handed out at the second annual Primetime Emmy Awards ceremony in 1950, where KTLA, a local television station in Los Angeles, won the award for coverage of wrestling. The following year, another Los Angeles-based station, KNBH, won an Emmy for their coverage of the Los Angeles Rams American football team. At the seventh Primetime Emmys in 1955, NBC became the first major network to win a Sports Emmy Award for its series, the Gillette Cavalcade of Sports.

In 1979, an Emmys exclusively for sports coverage was held for the first time at the Rainbow Room in New York City. Winners included golf announcer Jack Whitaker, and CBS's The NFL Today. The ninth annual Sports Emmy Awards, hosted by actors Alan Thicke and Joan Van Ark and held on July 13, 1988, became the first Sports Emmys ceremony to be televised; the live telecast was syndicated nationwide by Raycom Sports. Dennis Miller hosted in the 12th Sports Emmys in 1991, which was broadcast on ESPN.

== Rules ==
Among the Sports Emmy rules, a show must originally air on American television during the eligibility period between January 1 and December 31, and to at least 50 percent of the country. A show that enters into the Sports Emmys cannot also be entered into any other national Emmy competition. Certain shows and segments that air on sports networks that are more entertainment or news, including award shows, the opening and closing ceremonies of the Olympics, and the Super Bowl halftime show, are ineligible for the Sports Emmys.

Entries must be submitted by mid-January. Most award categories also require entries to include DVDs or tape masters of the show. For most program categories, the submitted DVDs should feature up to five excerpts. For most personality categories, there is no limit in the number of segments submitted, but the DVD should not run over a total of 12 minutes.

Voting is done by peer judging panels between February and early March. The Academy solicits anybody with significant experience in national sports production to serve as judges. The panels are organized so that they only have one representative from each corporate entity (i.e. Paramount Global, Disney, NBCUniversal, Fox Corporation, Warner Bros. Discovery etc.) Most categories only have a single voting round using preferential scoring system. The top 5 entries in each category are announced as the "nominations", and then the top entry is announced as the Emmy winner later at the awards ceremony.

When a show wins a Sports Emmy, each member of the crew that worked on the production is eligible to purchase an Emmy statue, provided that their job title corresponds to the category that the show won the award in. This policy can result in many different people "winning" an Emmy for a single production; for example, when the Olympics on NBC wins an award for Outstanding Technical Team (Remote), as often occurs, the hundreds of personnel working on the production all have the right to purchase an Emmy statue. Depending on the production, the show or network that won the award will sometimes pay for the purchase of statues for the entire crew.

== Categories ==
At that inaugural ceremony in 1979, there were 12 categories. The 43rd ceremony in 2022 awarded the following 47 competitive categories:

=== Programming ===
- Outstanding Live Sports Special
- Outstanding Live Sports Series
- Outstanding Playoff Coverage
- Outstanding Edited Event Coverage
- Outstanding Edited Special
- Outstanding Hosted Edited Series
- Outstanding Esports Championship Coverage
- Outstanding Short Documentary
- Outstanding Long Documentary
- Outstanding Documentary Series
- Outstanding Documentary Series - Serialized
- Outstanding Open/Tease
- Outstanding Studio Show - Weekly
- Outstanding Studio Show - Daily
- Outstanding Studio Show - Limited Run
- Outstanding Journalism
- Outstanding Short Feature
- Outstanding Long Feature
- Outstanding Studio Show in Spanish
- Outstanding Feature Story in Spanish
- Outstanding Interactive Experience - Event Coverage
- Outstanding Interactive Experience - Original Programming
- Outstanding Digital Innovation
- Outstanding Promotional Announcement
- Outstanding Public Service Announcement/Campaign

=== Personality ===
- Outstanding Sports Personality, Studio Host
- Outstanding Sports Personality, Play-by-Play
- Outstanding Sports Personality, Studio Analyst
- Outstanding Sports Personality, Sports Event Analyst
- Outstanding Sports Personality, Sports Reporter
- Outstanding Sports Personality/Emerging On-Air Talent
- Outstanding On-Air Personality in Spanish

=== Technical ===
- Outstanding Technical Team Event
- Outstanding Technical Team Studio
- Outstanding Camera Work - Short Form
- Outstanding Camera Work - Long Form
- Outstanding Editing - Short Forn
- Outstanding Editing - Long Form
- Outstanding Music Direction
- Outstanding Studio or Production Design/Art Direction
- Outstanding Audio/Sound - Live Event
- Outstanding Audio/Sound - Post-Produced
- Outstanding Graphic Design - Event/Show
- Outstanding Graphic Design - Specialty
- The Dick Schaap Outstanding Writing Award Short Form
- Outstanding Writing Award Long Form
- The George Wensel Technical Achievement Award

=== Special awards ===
- Sports Lifetime Achievement Award

=== Defunct categories ===
- Outstanding Host or Commentator
- Outstanding Analyst
- Outstanding Achievement In Content For Non-Traditional Delivery Platforms

== Multiple wins by a Series ==
9 wins

- NBC Sunday Night Football

8 wins

- College GameDay
- Inside the NBA
- Monday Night Football

7 wins

- NFL GameDay/Sunday NFL Countdown

6 wins

- MLB Tonight

5 wins

- Inside the NFL
- NFL on CBS
- The NFL Today

4 wins

- CBS's coverage of the NCAA Division I men's basketball tournament
- Fox NFL Sunday
- Major League Baseball on Fox
- NASCAR on Fox
- SportsCenter

3 wins

- Pardon the Interruption

2 wins

- ESPN SpeedWorld
- ESPN Sunday Night Football

== Multiple wins by a Personality ==
28 wins

- Bob Costas

16 wins

- Cris Collinsworth
- John Madden

12 wins

- John Sterling

9 wins

- Jim McKay
- Mike Emrick

7 wins

- Joe Buck
- Ernie Johnson, Jr.
- Al Michaels
- Larry Gebhardt

5 wins

- Charles Barkley

4 wins

- Dick Enberg
- Bill Raftery

3 wins

- Terry Bradshaw
- Mike Breen
- James Brown
- Kirk Herbstreit
- Keith Jackson
- Tim McCarver
- Harold Reynolds
- Tom Verducci

2 wins

- Joe Morgan
- Jim Nantz
- Ken Rosenthal
- Michele Tafoya

== See also ==
- Primetime Emmy Award § Retired categories
- List of American television awards
- List of sports journalism awards
