= Outstanding Sports Personality, Play-by-Play =

Sports Emmy award

The Sports Emmy Award for Outstanding Sports Personality, Play-by-Play was first awarded in 1993. It is awarded to whom the National Academy of Television Arts and Sciences judges to be the best play-by-play announcer in a calendar year.

Prior to 1993, an award was given in a category that awarded either a play-by-play announcer or studio host. See Outstanding Host or Commentator for a list of winners in the now-defunct category.

== List of winners ==
- 1993: Dick Enberg (NBC)
- 1994: Keith Jackson (ABC)
- 1995: Al Michaels (ABC)
- 1996: Keith Jackson (2) (ABC)
- 1997: Bob Costas (NBC)
- 1998: Keith Jackson (3) (ABC)
- 1999: Keith Jackson (4) (ABC)
- 2000: Al Michaels (2) (ABC)
- 2001: Joe Buck (FOX)
- 2002: Joe Buck (2) (FOX)
- 2003: Joe Buck (3) (FOX)
- 2004: Joe Buck (4) (FOX)
- 2005: Joe Buck (5) (FOX)
- 2006: Al Michaels (3) (ABC/NBC)
- 2007: Al Michaels (4) (NBC)
- 2008: Jim Nantz (CBS)
- 2009: Jim Nantz (2) (CBS)
- 2010: Mike Emrick (NBC)
- 2011: Joe Buck (6) (FOX)
- 2012: Al Michaels (5) (NBC)
- 2013: Mike Emrick (2) (NBC)
- 2014: Mike Emrick (3) (NBC/NBCSN)
- 2015: Mike Emrick (4) (NBC/NBCSN)
- 2016: Mike Emrick (5) (NBC/NBCSN)
- 2017: Mike Emrick (6) (NBC/NBCSN)
- 2018: Mike Emrick (7) (NBC/NBCSN)
- 2019: Mike Emrick (8) (NBC/NBCSN)
- 2020: Mike Emrick (9) (NBC/NBCSN)
- 2021: Joe Buck (7) (FOX)
- 2022: Mike Breen (ABC/ESPN)
- 2023: Mike Breen (2) (ABC/ESPN)
- 2024: Mike Breen (3) (ABC/ESPN)
- 2025: Joe Davis (FOX)
