= Outstanding Live Sports Special =

Sports award

The Sports Emmy Award for Outstanding Live Sports Special has been awarded since 1976. It is awarded to a network for their coverage of one specific sporting event in a calendar year, which means it should not be confused with the award for Outstanding Live Sports Series.

== List of winners ==
- 1975-76: 1975 World Series (NBC)
- 1976-77: 1976 Summer Olympics (ABC)
- 1977-78: Muhammad Ali vs. Leon Spinks heavyweight championship match (CBS)
- 1978-79: Super Bowl XIII (NBC)
- 1979-80: 1980 Winter Olympics (ABC)
- 1980-81: 1981 Kentucky Derby (ABC)
- 1981-82: 1982 Men's NCAA Basketball National Championship game between the University of North Carolina and Georgetown University (CBS)
- 1982-83: 1982 World Series (NBC)
- 1983-84: no award was given
- 1984-85: 1984 Summer Olympics (ABC)
- 1985-86: no award was given
- 1986-87: 1987 Daytona 500 (CBS)
- 1987-88: 1987 Kentucky Derby (ABC)
- 1988: 1988 Summer Olympics (NBC)
- 1989: 1989 Indianapolis 500 (ABC)
- 1990: 1990 Indianapolis 500 (ABC)
- 1991: 1991 NBA Finals (NBC)
- 1992: 1992 Breeders Cup (NBC)
- 1993: 1993 World Series (CBS)
- 1994: 1994 Stanley Cup Final (ESPN)
- 1995: The September 6, 1995 baseball game in which Cal Ripken Jr. played in his 2,131st consecutive game, breaking a record previously held by Lou Gehrig (ESPN)
- 1996: 1996 World Series (FOX)
- 1997: 1997 NBA Finals (NBC)
- 1998: September 8, 1998 Cardinals/Cubs baseball game in which Mark McGwire hit his 62nd home run of the season. (FOX)
- 1999: 1999 Major League Baseball All-Star Game (FOX)
- 2000: 2000 World Series (FOX)
- 2001: 2001 World Series (FOX)
- 2002: 2002 Winter Olympics (NBC)
- 2003: 2003 Major League Baseball postseason (FOX)
- 2004: 2004 Masters Tournament (CBS)
  - Major League Baseball: Division Series (ESPN)
  - Super Bowl XXXVIII (CBS)
  - 2004 Wimbledon Championships (NBC)
  - 2004 World Series (FOX)
- 2005: 2005 Open Championship (TNT)
  - 2005 Little League World Series (ABC/ESPN)
  - 2005 Masters Tournament (CBS)
  - 2005 Preakness Stakes (NBC)
  - 2005 World Series (FOX)
- 2006: 2006 Major League Baseball postseason (FOX)
  - 2006 FIFA World Cup (ABC)
  - Indianapolis Colts - Pittsburgh Steelers Divisional Playoff (CBS)
  - 2006 Masters Tournament (CBS)
  - 2006 Preakness Stakes (NBC)
- 2007: 2007 Tostitos Fiesta Bowl (FOX)
  - Dallas Cowboys - Seattle Seahawks Wild Card Playoff (NBC)
  - 2007 Daytona 500 (FOX)
  - 2007 AFC Championship Game (CBS)
  - 2007 Open Championship (ABC/ESPN)
  - Super Bowl XLI (CBS)
- 2008: 2008 U.S. Open Golf Championship (NBC)
  - 2008 Daytona 500 (FOX)
  - Super Bowl XLII (FOX)
  - 2008 Wimbledon Championships – Men's Singles final (NBC)
  - X Games XIV (ESPN)
- 2009: Super Bowl XLIII (NBC)
  - 2009 Breeders' Cup (ESPN)
  - 2009 Indianapolis 500 (ABC)
  - 2009 NBA Playoffs (TNT)
  - 2009 Stanley Cup Final (NBC)
  - 2009 World Series (FOX)
- 2010: 2010 FIFA World Cup Final (ABC)
  - 2010 Breeders' Cup (ESPN)
  - 2010 Masters Tournament (CBS)
  - 2010 NBA Finals (ABC)
  - 2010 Ryder Cup (NBC/USA)
  - 2010 Tour de France (Versus)
- 2011: 2011 World Series (FOX)
  - 2011 Daytona 500 (FOX)
  - 2011 FIFA Women's World Cup Final (ESPN)
  - 2011 Masters Tournament (CBS)
  - 2011 Stanley Cup Final (NBC/Versus)
- 2012: Super Bowl XLVI (NBC)
  - 2012 Army–Navy Game (CBS)
  - 2012 Indianapolis 500 (ABC)
  - 2012 Masters Tournament (CBS)
  - 2012 World Series (FOX)
- 2013: 2013 World Series (FOX)
  - 2013 America's Cup (NBCSN)
  - 2013 Daytona 500 (FOX)
  - 2013 NBA Finals (ABC/ESPN)
  - 2013 Wimbledon Championships (ABC/ESPN)
- 2014: Super Bowl XLIX (NBC)
  - 146th Belmont Stakes (NBC)
  - 2014 FIFA World Cup Final (ABC)
  - 2015 College Football Playoff National Championship (ESPN)
  - 2014 Daytona 500 (FOX)
- 2015: Super Bowl 50 (CBS)
  - 147th Belmont Stakes (NBC)
  - 2015 NBA All-Star Saturday Night (TNT)
  - 2015 World Series (FOX)
  - 2015 Masters Tournament (CBS)
- 2016: 2016 World Series (FOX)
  - 2016 NBA Finals (ABC)
  - 2016 Summer Olympics (NBC)
  - 2017 College Football Playoff National Championship (ESPN)
  - Super Bowl LI (FOX)
- 2017: 118th Army–Navy Game (CBS)
  - 2017 Masters Tournament (CBS)
  - 2017 Open Championship (NBC/Golf Channel)
  - 2017 World Series (FOX)
  - 2018 College Football Playoff National Championship (ESPN)
- 2018: 2018 World Series (FOX)
  - 150th Belmont Stakes (NBC)
  - 2018 Tour Championship (NBC/Golf Channel)
  - 2019 College Football Playoff National Championship (ESPN)
  - Super Bowl LIII (CBS)
- 2019: 2019 Masters (CBS)
  - 2019 Stanley Cup Final (NBC)
  - 2019 FIFA Women's World Cup final (Fox)
  - 61st Daytona 500 (Fox)
  - 115th World Series (Fox)
- 2020: 2020 NBA All-Star Game (TNT/TBS)
  - The Match: Champions for Charity (TNT/TBS/HLN/TruTV)
  - 146th Kentucky Derby (NBC)
  - Super Bowl LV (CBS)
  - 116th World Series (Fox)
- 2021: 2021 MLB at Field of Dreams (Fox)
  - 122nd Army–Navy Game (CBS)
  - 103rd PGA Championship (CBS)
  - Games of the XXXII Olympiad (NBC/CNBC/Golf Channel/NBCSN/USA/Olympic Channel)
  - Super Bowl LVI (NBC)
- 2022: XXIV Olympic Winter Games (NBC)
  - 2022 FIFA World Cup final (Fox)
  - 148th Kentucky Derby (NBC)
  - 2022 MLB at Field of Dreams (Fox)
  - Super Bowl LVII (Fox)
  - 118th World Series (Fox)
- 2023: Super Bowl LVIII (CBS)
  - 2023 Masters Tournament (CBS)
  - 105th PGA Championship (CBS)
  - Super Bowl LVIII: "Live from Bikini Bottom" (Nickelodeon)
  - 119th World Series (Fox)
- 2024: Games of the XXXIII Olympiad (NBC/Peacock)
  - 120th World Series (Fox)
  - 124th US Open (NBC/USA/Peacock)
  - 2024 Masters Tournament (CBS)
  - 2024 NCAA Women's Tournament Championship Game (ABC)
- 2025: 2025 World Series (Fox)
  - 2025 College Football Playoff National Championship (ESPN)
  - 2025 NBA Finals (ABC)
  - 2025 Masters Tournament (CBS/ESPN)
  - Super Bowl LX (Fox)

== Total awards ==
- NBC - 14
- FOX - 13
- ABC - 8
- CBS - 8
- ESPN - 2
- TNT - 1
