= 43rd Sports Emmy Awards =

- Date: May 24, 2022
- Location: Jazz at Lincoln Center's Frederick P. Rose Hall, New York City
- Most awards: NFL 360 (4)
- Most nominations: NFL 360 (12)

The 43rd Sports Emmy Awards were presented by the National Academy of Television Arts and Sciences (NATAS), honoring the best in American sports television coverage in 2021. The ceremony took place in-person for the first time in three years, at the Jazz at Lincoln Center's Frederick P. Rose Hall in New York City.

The nominations were announced on April 6, 2022. ESPN was the most nominated network with 40 nominations while NFL 360 received more nominations than any other program with 12. American sports broadcaster and television personality Lesley Visser became the first female recipient of the Lifetime Achievement Award.

== Winners and nominees ==
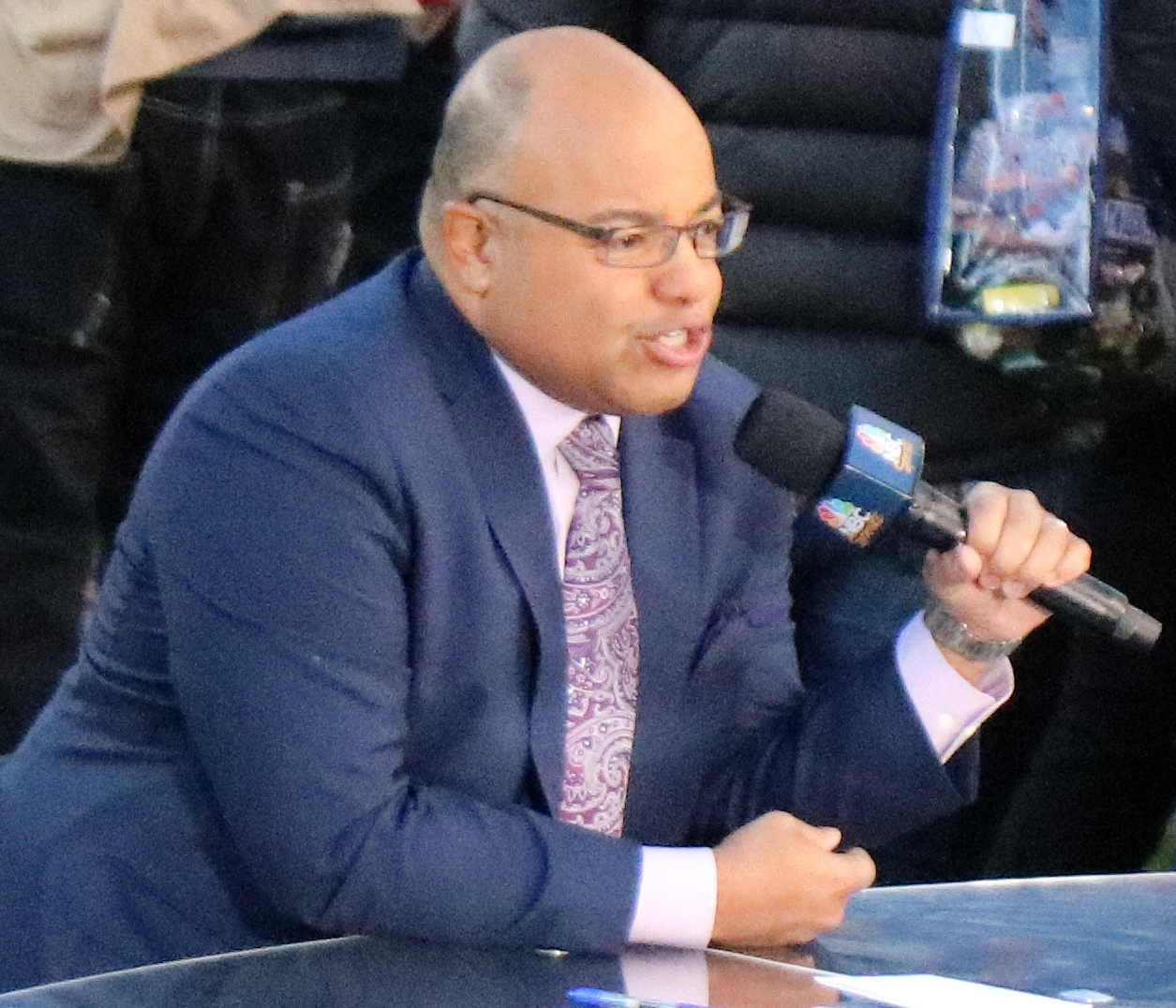
Mike Tirico, Outstanding Sports Personality/Studio Host winner

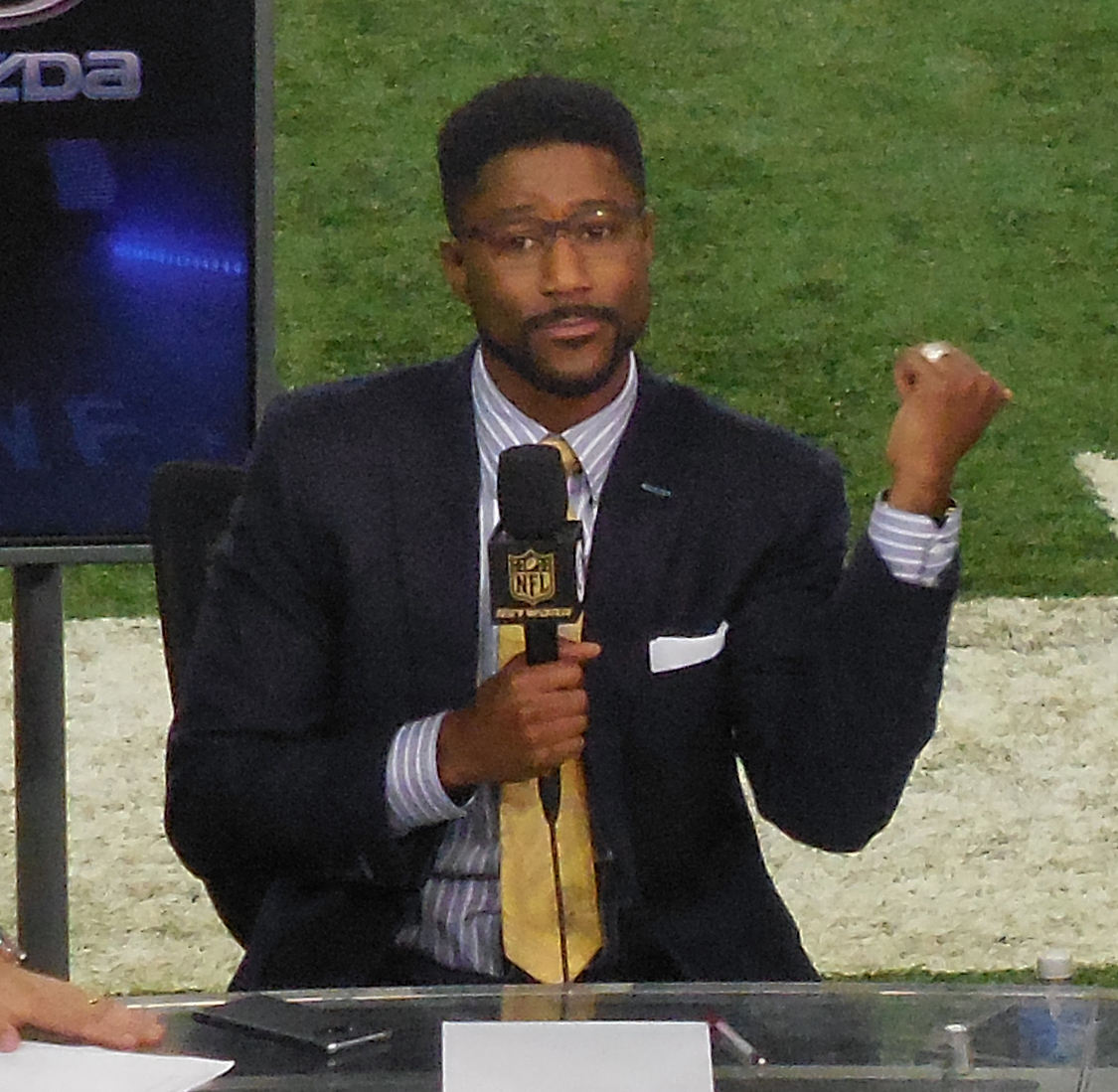
Nate Burleson, Outstanding Sports Personality/Play-by-Play winner

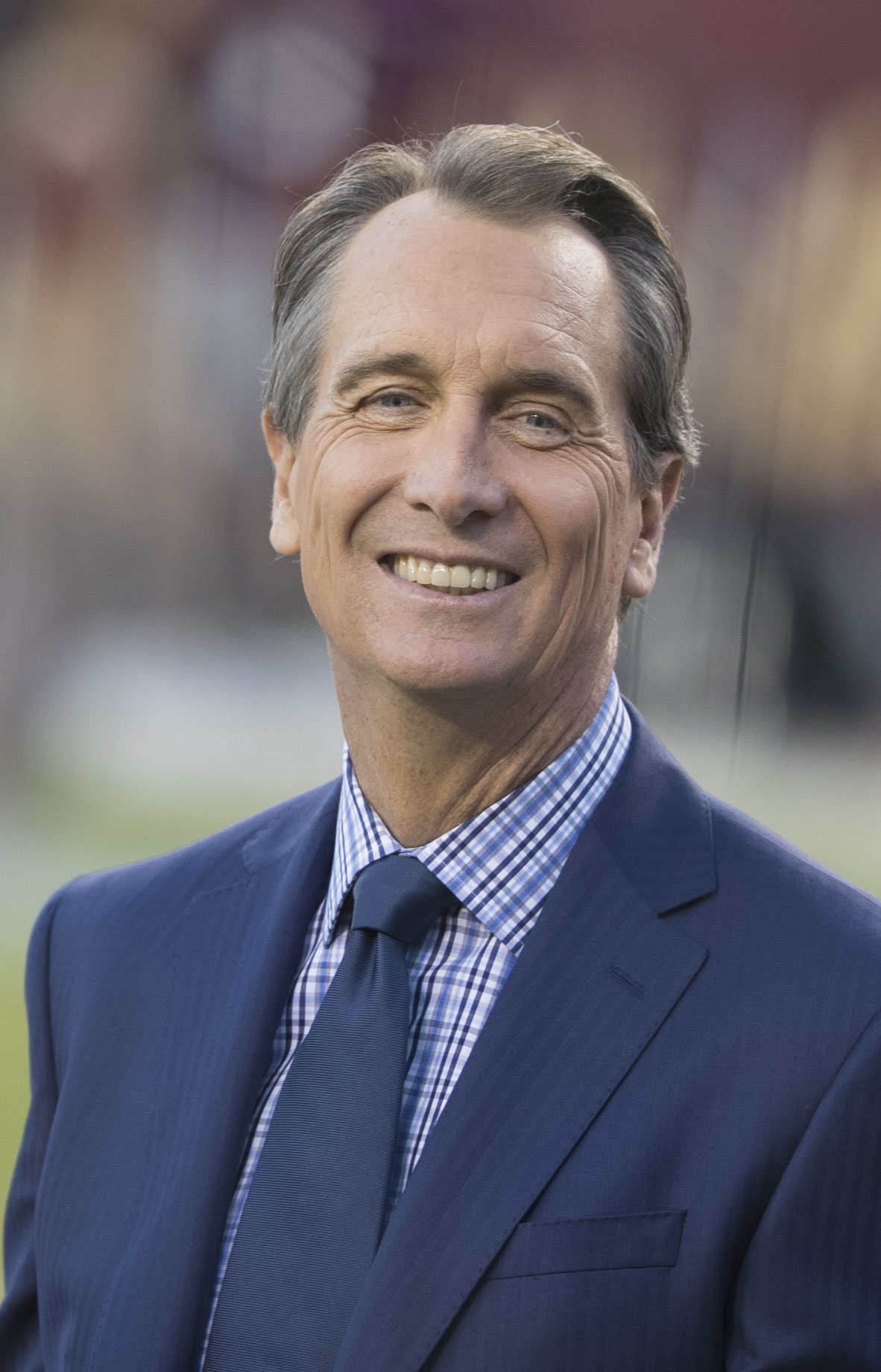
Cris Collinsworth, Outstanding Sports Personality/Sports Event Analyst winner

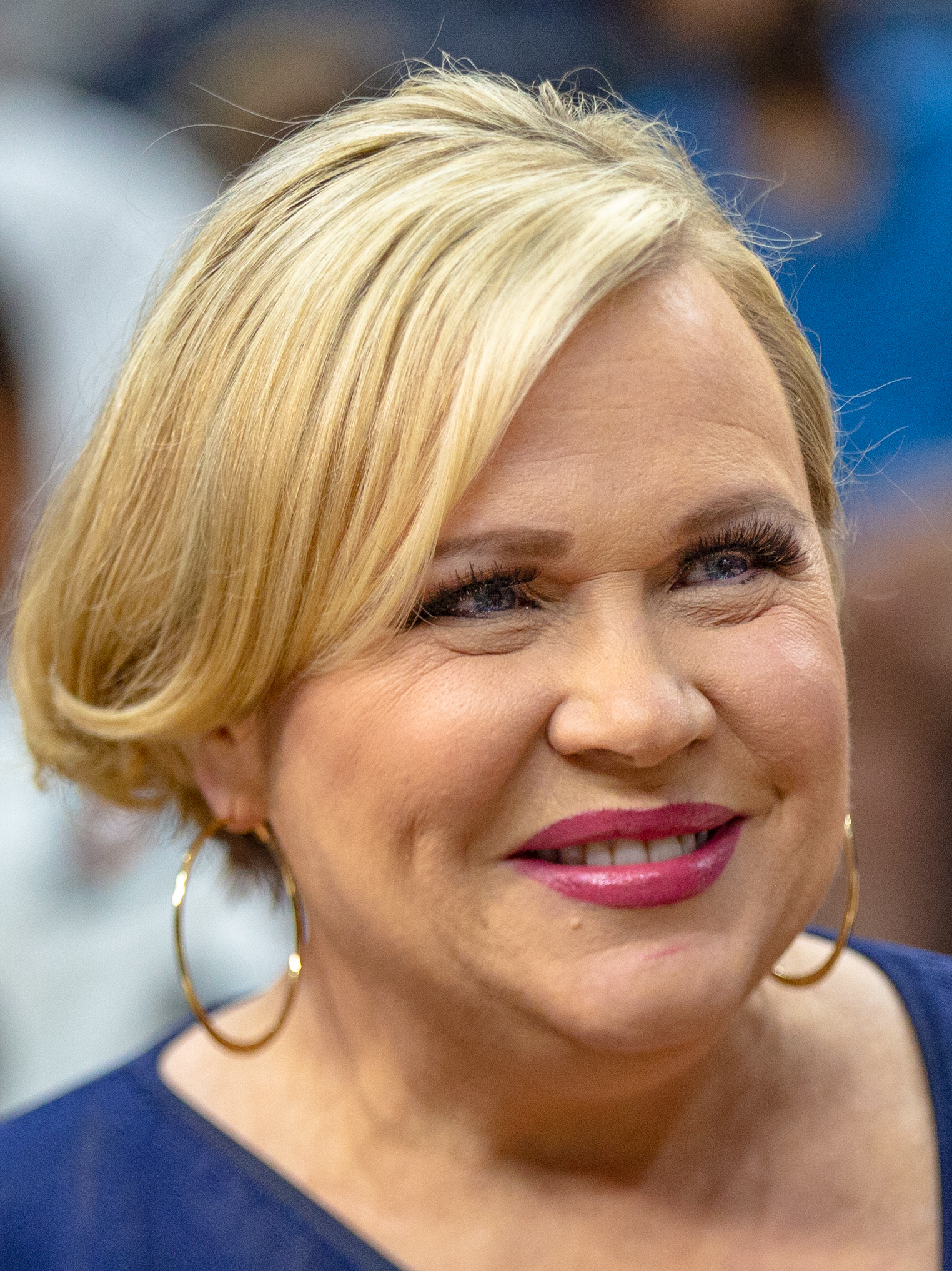
Holly Rowe, Outstanding Sports Personality/Sports Reporter winner

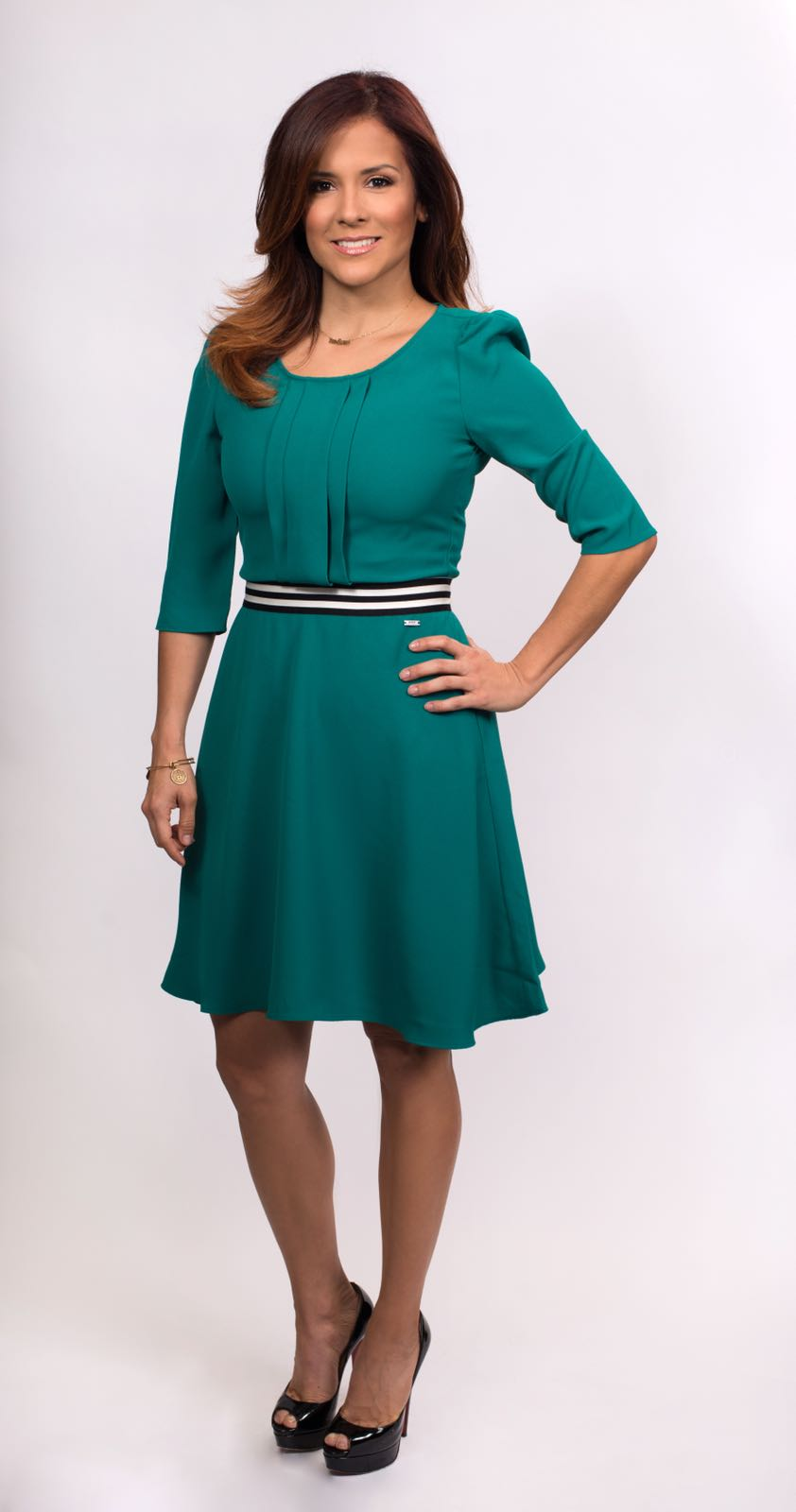
Adriana Monsalve, Outstanding On-Air Personality in Spanish winner

The nominees were announced on April 6, 2022. The winners were announced on May 24, 2022.

=== Lifetime Achievement Award ===
- Lesley Visser

=== Programming ===
Outstanding Live Sports Special	Outstanding Live Sports Series
MLB at Field of Dreams: "New York Yankees vs. Chicago White Sox" (FOX); 103rd PGA Championship (CBS); The 122nd Army–Navy Game (CBS); Games of the XXXII Olympiad (NBC); Super Bowl LVI: "Los Angeles Rams vs. Cincinnati Bengals" (NBC/Peacock)	Monday Night Football with Peyton & Eli (ESPN2/ESPN+); FOX College Football (FOX/FS1); FOX MLB (FOX/FS1); NFL on CBS (CBS); Sunday Night Football (NBC)
Outstanding Playoff Coverage	Outstanding Edited Event Coverage
AFC Playoffs: "Buffalo Bills vs. Kansas City Chiefs" (CBS); American League Championship Series: "Houston Astros vs. Boston Red Sox" (FOX/FS1); NBA on ESPN (ESPN); NCAA Men's Basketball National Semifinal: "UCLA Bruins vs. Gonzaga Bulldogs" (tbs/CBS/TNT/truTV); NFC Playoffs (FOX)	NFL Game Day All-Access: "Super Bowl LVI" (YouTube); America's Game: The 2020 Tampa Bay Buccaneers (NFL Network); Hey Rookie: Welcome to the NFL: "The 2021 NFL Draft" (ESPN); NFL Turning Point: Divisional Round (ESPN+); Road to the Super Bowl (NBC); UFC The Walk: "Poirier vs. McGregor 2" (UFC Fight Pass); UFC The Walk: "Usman vs. Masvidal 2" (UFC Fight Pass)
Outstanding Edited Special	Outstanding Hosted Edited Series
KOBE: The Legend, The Legacy (ESPN); MLB Network Presents: Remembering the Game for New York (MLB Network); Muhammad Ali vs. Joe Frazier 50th Anniversary Special (ABC); NFL 360: Black History Month (NFL Network); NFL 360: Women in Football (NFL Network)	Real Sports with Bryant Gumbel (HBO/HBO Max); Back on the Record with Bob Costas (HBO/HBO Max); E:60 (ESPN+); Eli's Places (ESPN); The Shop: Uninterrupted (HBO/HBO Max)
Outstanding Esports Championship Coverage	Outstanding Short Documentary
The International 10 - Dota2: "Team Spirit vs. PSG.LGD" (Twitch/YouTube/Steam TV); League of Legends Worlds 2021 Final: "DAMWON KIA vs. Edward Gaming" (LoLEsports.com/Twitch/YouTube); Overwatch League 2021 Grand Finals: "Shanghai Dragons vs. Atlanta Reign" (YouTube); Ultimate Madden Bowl Finale (Twitch); WePlay AniMajor: "Evil Geniuses vs. PSG.LGD" (Twitch)	NFL 360: "Mark Pattison: Searching for the Summit" (NFL Network); Black History Always Special: "Finding Free" (ESPN+); Black History Always Special: "I Run with Maud" (ESPN+); Black History Always Special: "Monochrome" (ESPN+); Relentless: "The Brendon Wiseley Story" (FS1); UFC Chronicles: "A Tree Is Known By Its Fruit" (UFC Fight Pass)
Outstanding Long Documentary	Outstanding Documentary Series
The Alpinist (Netflix); 144 (ESPN); LFG (HBO/HBO Max); Sir Alex Ferguson: Never Give In (Paramount+); VICE VERSA: "Fear of a Black Quarterback" (VICE TV)	Man in the Arena: "Tom Brady" (ESPN+); A Football Life (NFL Network); Bad Sport (Netflix); Level Playing Field (HBO/HBO Max); The Inside Story (TNT)
Outstanding Documentary Series - Serialized	Outstanding Open/Tease
Formula 1: Drive to Survive (Netflix); Golden: The Journey of USA's Elite Gymnasts (Peacock); Hard Knocks: "The Dallas Cowboys" (HBO/HBO Max); Last Chance U: Basketball (Netflix); Simone vs. Herself (Facebook Watch)	NHL on ESPN: "Harmony" (ESPN); College Football on CBS: "Generation 9/11" (CBS); NBA on TNT: "NBA 75th Anniversary" (TNT); NCAA March Madness: "Made for Madness" (tbs/CBS/TNT/truTV); The 122nd Army–Navy Game: "In Service" (CBS)
Outstanding Studio Show - Weekly	Outstanding Studio Show - Daily
Inside the NBA on TNT (TNT); College GameDay (ESPN); FOX NFL Sunday (FOX); NFL Slimetime (Nickelodeon); Outside the Lines (ESPN)	Good Morning Football (NFL Network); The Dan Patrick Show (Peacock); NASCAR Race Hub (FS1); Pardon the Interruption (ESPN); The Rich Eisen Show (Peacock); SportsCenter (ESPN)
Outstanding Studio Show - Limited Run	Outstanding Journalism
Inside the NBA on TNT: "Playoffs" (TNT); College GameDay: "College Football Playoff" (ESPN); Golf Central Live from The PGA Championship (Golf Channel); Postseason NFL Countdown (ESPN); Road to the Final Four (tbs/CBS/TNT/truTV)	E:60: "Alive: The Drew Robinson Story" (ESPN); E:60: "Fistful of Steel: The Rise of Bubba Wallace" (ESPN); E:60: "Ticket Home" (ESPN); Real Sports with Bryant Gumbel: "Silent No More: Sexual Abuse at the University of Michigan" (HBO/HBO Max); Real Sports with Bryant Gumbel: "The Dark Side of Cheer: Sexual Predators in the World of Competitive Cheerleading" (HBO/HBO Max)
Outstanding Short Feature	Outstanding Long Feature
The NFL Today: "The Move" (CBS); NFL 360: "Sam Gordon: In a League of Their Own" (NFL Network); SC Featured: "A Father's Resilience" (ESPN); The Arena on TNT: "'The Stage' by Harry Edwards" (TNT); Welcome to NBA Lane (NBA Social)	NFL 360: "Through the Ashes: The Story of Black Wall Street" (NFL Network); NFL 360: "Kwity Paye: KWITY" (NFL Network); Real Sports with Bryant Gumbel: "Oksana: The Remarkable Story of Paralympic Superstar Oksana Masters" (HBO/HBO Max); SC Featured: "17 Hours: The Chris Nikic Story" (ESPN); Sunday NFL Countdown: "Hey Noah" (ESPN)
Outstanding Studio Show in Spanish	Outstanding Feature Story in Spanish
Games of the XXXII Olympiad (Telemundo); Fútbol Central (Univision/TUDN); República Deportiva (Univision/TUDN); SportsCenter (ESPN Deportes); Sunday Night Football (Telemundo)	Greenland: "New York" (ESPN Deportes); En Sus Zapatos: "Alexa Moreno" (ESPN Deportes); Nos Vemos en el Podio (Telemundo); SC Reportajes: "Kikimita" (ESPN Deportes); Último Tren a Tokio (ESPN Deportes)
Outstanding Interactive Experience - Event Coverage	Outstanding Interactive Experience - Original Programming
Games of the XXXII Olympiad (NBC); 2021 NCAA March Madness: "March Madness Live" (NCAA.com); College Football Playoff National Championship MegaCast (ESPN/ESPN2/ESPNU/ESPNews/SEC Network/ESPN Deportes/ESPN3/ESPN App); Red Bull Rampage (Red Bull TV); The 2021 U.S. Open Championships (U.S. Open AR App)	NBA on TNT Tuesday (TNT); Everest: A Trek To Base Camp (iFIT); FOX College Football: "Ultimate College Football Road Trip" (FOX/FS1/FOXSports.com); House of Highlights: "Showdown Series" (Bleacher Report); NFL Slimetime: "NVP Trophy" (Nickelodeon)
Outstanding Digital Innovation	Outstanding Promotional Announcement
MLB Home Run Derby: "MLB XR" (MLB AR/VR Apps); Fan Controlled Football (Twitch); Raw: Emotions Unite Us (Paralympic.org); The Players Championship: "Every Shot Live" (PGA TOUR Digital Platforms); The Portal (Bleacher Report)	FOX College Football: "Big Noon Energy" (FOX/FS1); All Madden: "Trailer" (FOX); Fox NASCAR: "Best Season Ever" (FS1); Games of the XXXII Olympiad: "Imagine" (NBC); NASCAR Race Hub: "Bristol Dirt" (FS1)
Outstanding Public Service Announcement/Campaign
#StrongerTogether: "What Agnes Saw" (Olympics.com); #WeThe15 Twitter (Facebook/NBC/YouTube); Celebrating Black Stories: "Alice Coachman", "Josh Gibson", "Lucy Diggs Slowe" (CBS Sports Network); Inspire Change: "Where I'm From" (NFL); Mental Health PSA Campaign: "Series Intro with Michael Robinson", "Hayden Hurst", "DJ Chark" (NFL Network/ESPN/ABC)

=== Personality ===
Outstanding Sports Personality/Studio Host	Outstanding Sports Personality/Play-by-Play
Mike Tirico (NBC); Rece Davis (ESPN/ESPN2/ABC); Rich Eisen (NFL Network/Peacock/NBCSN/DIRECTV/B/R Live); Ernie Johnson (TNT); Scott Van Pelt (ESPN)	Mike Breen (ABC); Joe Buck (FOX/FS1/NFL Network); Ian Eagle (tbs/CBS/TNT/truTV); Al Michaels (NBC); Jim Nantz (tbs/CBS/TNT/truTV)
Outstanding Sports Personality/Studio Analyst	Outstanding Sports Personality/Sports Event Analyst
Nate Burleson (CBS/CBS Sports Network/Nickelodeon/NFL Network); Jay Bilas (ESPN/ESPN2/ABC); Kirk Herbstreit (ESPN/ESPN2/ABC); Harold Reynolds (MLB Network); Kenny Smith (TNT)	Cris Collinsworth (NBC); Troy Aikman (FOX/NFL Network); Gary Danielson (CBS); Kirk Herbstreit (ESPN/ESPN2/ABC); Peyton Manning (ESPN2/ESPN+)
Outstanding Sports Personality/Sports Reporter	Outstanding Sports Personality/Emerging On-Air Talent
Holly Rowe (ESPN/ESPN2/ABC); Tom Rinaldi (FOX/FS1/NFL Network); Lisa Salters (ESPN/ABC); Michele Tafoya (NBC); Tracy Wolfson (tbs/CBS/TNT(truTV)	Malika Andrews (ESPN); Julian Edelman (Paramount+); Eli Manning (ESPN/ESPN+); Greg Olsen (FOX/NFL Network); Taylor Rooks (Bleacher Report/TNT/Twitter)
Outstanding On-Air Personality in Spanish
Adriana Monsalve (Univision/TUDN); Cristina Alexander (ESPN Deportes); Andrés Cantor (Telemundo); Lindsay Casinelli (Univision/TUDN); Miguel Gurwitz (Telemundo); Ana Jurka (Telemundo)

=== Technical ===
Outstanding Technical Team Event	Outstanding Technical Team Studio
College Football National Championship: "Alabama Crimson Tide vs. Georgia Bulldogs" (ESPN); 103rd PGA Championship (CBS); Games of the XXXII Olympiad (NBC); The Masters (CBS); US Open (ESPN)	Super Bowl LVI Pregame Show (NBC); College GameDay (ESPN); MLB at Field of Dreams (FOX); Games of the XXXII Olympiad (NBC); Monday Night Football with Peyton & Eli (ESPN2/ESPN+)
Outstanding Camera Work - Short Form	Outstanding Camera Work - Long Form
The NFL Today: "The Move" – Thom McCallum, Jeff Fisher, Matt Furuta (CBS); FOX NFL: "Live from Los Angeles", "Annapolis Open", "The One Man Report" (FOX); Games of the XXXII Olympiad: "A Vision as One", "The Best of U.S." (NBC); NFL 360: "Ode to South Central" (NFL Network); NFL Films Presents Shots of the Year (FS1)	The Ultimate Run – Christoph Thoresen, Michael Haunschmidt, Lukas Kusstatscher, Sven Lerjen, Alexander Meliss, Torge Nagel, Julian Pintarelli, Daniel Schiessl, Martin Venier, Jonas Vieider (Red Bull TV); Dispatches: "Wall of Skulls" (Outside TV); NFL 360: "Mark Pattison: Searching for the Summit" (NFL Network); NFL 360: "Solomon Thomas: Breathe" (NFL Network); Outsiders of the Year: "Tommy Rivs" (Outside TV); The Alpinist (Netflix)
Outstanding Editing - Short Forn	Outstanding Editing - Long Form
NFL 360: "Ode to South Central" – Stephanie Yang (NFL Network); Games of the XXXII Olympiad: "Titans" (NBC); NFL 360: "Jonathan Allen: Alone" (NFL Network); SC Featured: "A Father's Resilience" (ESPN); The NFL Today: "The Move" (CBS); Welcome to NBA Lane (NBA Social)	TIGER – Nicholas Biagetti, Matthew Hamachek, Daniel Koehler, Monica Yuen (HBO/HBO Max); E:60: "Alive: The Drew Robinson Story" (ESPN); Formula 1: Drive to Survive (Netflix); Hard Knocks: "The Dallas Cowboys" (HBO/HBO Max); Man in the Arena: "Tom Brady" (ESPN+)
Outstanding Music Direction	Outstanding Studio or Production Design/Art Direction
NHL on ESPN: "Harmony" – Mike Farrell, John N. Minton III, Michael Sciallis, Megan Anderson Rinaldi, Scott Cikowski, Madeline Rundlett, Claude Mitchell, Kevin Wilson, Bob Christianson (ESPN); College Football on CBS: "Generation 9/11" (CBS); Dear Rider (HBO/HBO Max); Hard Knocks: "The Dallas Cowboys" (HBO/HBO Max); If You Build It: 30 Years of Field of Dreams (FOX)	Welcome to NBA Lane – Scott Falconer, Laurin Guthrie, Frances Hernandez, Johana Martinez, Chanae Reed, Steve Horn, Mina Mikhael (NBA Social); 2021 NBA Finals: "Opens" (ABC); MLB at Field of Dreams (FOX); Human Pinbull (Red Bull TV); The NFL Today: "The Move" (CBS)
Outstanding Audio/Sound - Live Event	Outstanding Audio/Sound - Post-Produced
FOX MLB (FOX/FS1); Fox NASCAR (FS1); Little League World Series (ESPN); NASCAR on NBC (NBC/NBCSN); NFL on CBS (CBS); NHL on ESPN (ESPN/ESPN+/ABC)	NCAA March Madness: "Made for Madness" – David Henshaw (tbs/CBS/TNT/truTV); Freeskiing: "The Ultimate Run" (Red Bull TV); Hard Knocks: "The Dallas Cowboys" (HBO/HBO Max); NASCAR Race Hub: "The Daytona 500: Radioactive" (FS1); NBA TV Hall of Fame: "Flight Through History" (NBA TV)
Outstanding Graphic Design - Event/Show	Outstanding Graphic Design - Specialty
Games of the XXXII Olympiad (NBC/NBCSN/CNBC/USA Network/MSNBC); NBA on ESPN: "Marvel Arena of Heroes" (ESPN2); NFC Wild Card Game on Nickelodeon: "San Francisco 49ers vs. Dallas Cowboys" (CBS/Nickelodeon); NFL Slimetime (Nickelodeon); NHL on ESPN (ESPN/ESPN+/ABC); NHL on TNT (TNT)	The Portal (Bleacher Report); A Gift from the Haudenosaunee (CBS/CBS Sports Network); College Football National Championship: "Alabama Crimson Tide vs. Georgia Bulldogs" (ESPN); Juneteenth (SEC Network); The NFL on ESPN (ESPN)
The Dick Schaap Outstanding Writing Award Short Form	Outstanding Writing Award Long Form
NFL 360: "Ode to South Central" – Written by Julian Gooden, Marcia McKenna (NFL Network); Back on the Record with Bob Costas: "Consider This: As the Games Go On" (HBO/HBO Max); Muhammad Ali vs. Joe Frazier 50th Anniversary Special: "Ali-Frazier: The Social Moment" (ABC); The 149th Open: "Teases" (NBC); The Arena on TNT: "Hank Aaron Tribute" (TNT)	MLB Tonight: "The Say Hey Kid at 90" – Written by Tom Verducci (MLB Network); All Access: "Canelo vs. Plant" (Showtime); Back on the Record with Bob Costas: "Consider This: Follow the Money" (HBO/HBO Max); Hard Knocks: "The Dallas Cowboys" (HBO/HBO Max); SEC Storied: "The Trials of Bobby Hoppe" (SEC Network); The Day Sports Stood Still (HBO/HBO Max)
The George Wensel Technical Achievement Award
NFL on CBS: "RomoVision" – Alvin Anol, Komal Bhukhanwala, Jason Cohen, Michael Francis, Elizabeth Graham, Rajiv Maheswaran, Joshua Mendoza, Ross Molloy, Drew Simon, Craig Stevens (CBS); 2021 Natural Selection Tour Jackson Hole: "Live Stabilized FPV Racing Drones" (Red Bull TV); FOX Sports: "XtraMotion" (FOX/FS1); Games of the XXXII Olympiad: "Friends & Family" (NBC); SRX on CBS: "ARTI" (CBS)

== Multiple wins ==
Shows that received multiple wins
Wins	Show	Network
4	NFL 360	NFL Network
3	Games of the XXXII Olympiad	NBC Sports
2	NHL on ESPN	ESPN
2	The NFL Today	CBS Sports

Wins by Network
Wins	Network
7	ESPN
6	CBS
6	NFL Network
5	NBC
4	TNT
3	Fox
2	ABC
2	ESPN+
2	ESPN2
2	FS1
2	HBO
2	HBO Max
2	Netflix
2	YouTube

== Multiple nominations ==
Shows that received multiple nominations
Nominations	Show	Network
12	NFL 360	NFL Network
10	Games of the XXXII Olympiad	NBC/NBCSN/CNBC/USA Network/MSNBC/Telemundo
6	E:60	ESPN
5	Hard Knocks	HBO/HBO Max
4	The NFL Today	CBS
4	NHL on ESPN	ESPN/ESPN+/ABC
4	Real Sports with Bryant Gumbel	HBO/HBO Max
3	Back on the Record with Bob Costas	HBO/HBO Max
3	Black History Always Special	ESPN+
3	College GameDay	ESPN
3	SC Featured	ESPN
3	FOX College Football	FOX/FS1/FOXSports.com
3	MLB at Field of Dreams	FOX
3	NASCAR Race Hub	FS1
3	NFL on CBS	CBS
3	NFL Slimetime	Nickelodeon
3	Welcome to NBA Lane	NBA Social
2	103rd PGA Championship	CBS
2	College Football on CBS	CBS
2	The Alpinist	Netflix
2	Formula 1: Drive to Survive	Netflix
2	The Arena on TNT	TNT
2	Fox NASCAR	FS1
2	College Football National Championship	ESPN
2	FOX MLB	FOX/FS1
2	Man in the Arena	ESPN+
2	Monday Night Football with Peyton & Eli	ESPN2/ESPN+
2	Muhammad Ali vs. Joe Frazier 50th Anniversary Special	ABC
2	NBA on ESPN	ESPN2
2	NCAA March Madness	tbs/CBS/TNT/truTV
2	The Portal	Bleacher Report
2	UFC The Walk	UFC Fight Pass

Nominations by Network
Nominations	Network
40	ESPN
27	CBS
22	FOX
22	NFL Network
20	NBC
18	HBO
18	HBO Max
18	TNT
16	FS1
12	ABC
12	ESPN+
10	ESPN2
7	ESPN Deportes
7	tbs
7	truTV
6	Netflix
6	Telemundo
5	Nickelodeon
5	Peacock
5	Red Bull TV
5	Twitch
5	YouTube
4	Bleacher Report
4	TUDN
4	Univision
3	CBS Sports Network
3	MLB Network
3	NBA Social
3	NBCSN
3	SEC Network
3	UFC Fight Pass
2	Outside TV
2	Paramount+
2	Twitter
