= Race: Bubba Wallace =

- Genre: Docu-series
- Starring: Bubba Wallace
- Country of origin: United States
- Original language: English
- No. of seasons: 1
- No. of episodes: 6

Production
- Running time: 44–50 min
- Production companies: 300 Studios; Boardwalk Pictures; NASCAR Productions

Original release
- Network: Netflix
- Release: February 22, 2022

Race: Bubba Wallace is a 2022 Netflix docuseries about the American professional stock car racing driver Bubba Wallace.

== Episodes ==
No. overall	No. in season	Title	Original release date
1	1	"A Fresh Start"	February 22, 2022
As America reckons with a pandemic and racial injustice; Bubba Wallace is moved to perform an act of resistance and make a name for himself in NASCAR.
2	2	"Great Expectations"	February 22, 2022
After his bold statement on CNN, Bubba teams with an icon and a competitor. Expectations run high at the Daytona 500 as the race comes to a fiery finish.
3	3	"Driving While Black"	February 22, 2022
Feeling immense pressure to win, Bubba aims for victory lane in Atlanta and Bristol. At Martinsville Speedway, he debuts a special message on his car.
4	4	"The Inner Voice"	February 22, 2022
Bubba reveals his struggle with depression amid personal rough patches on and off the track. A disturbing discovery leads to a show of NASCAR unity.
5	5	"The Road To Success"	February 22, 2022
After the results of an FBI investigation open Bubba to more criticism, road courses in Austin and Sonoma present their own set of challenges.
6	6	"Engine Of Change"	February 22, 2022
With sponsors lined up and several races left in the season, Bubba tries to manage his emotions and make the playoffs as NASCAR works to embrace change.
