= NBA Nation (tour) =

NBA Nation is a touring property operated by the National Basketball Association through its subsidiary, NBA Entertainment. The tour appears alongside local events across the United States during the spring and summer and features a variety of NBA-themed events and programs, such as skills contests and fitness clinics. The tour also addresses social issues in the host cities as part of the league's outreach program.

== History ==
In 2001, the NBA launched NBA Rhythm ’n Rims as a traveling basketball and music event in partnership with Yahoo!. On the road for six years, NBA Rhythm ’n Rims featured musical performances by popular recording artists, including Cee-Lo Green in 2002, MC Lyte in 2003 and Nappy Roots in 2004. During its time on the road, NBA and WNBA players and NBA Legends made appearances. The event was re-launched as NBA Nation in 2007.

The tour's itinerary changes each year. According to the NBA's Director of Events and Attractions, Karen Barberan, "Routing the NBA Nation tour year after year is a challenge, as we are constantly balancing efforts to hit well-attended events and festivals in key NBA markets, while satisfying the marketing targets of our tour [brand] partners." In a given year, over one million people across the U.S. will visit one of the tour stops.

== Events ==
NBA Nation features a competitive skills challenge similar to the events seen during NBA's All-Star Saturday Night, such as slam dunk contests and agility courses, with prizes awarded to the winners. Visitors can also attend basketball and fitness clinics and meet past and present NBA players. The clinics are hosted by NBA Ambassador and Legend, Darryl Dawkins, as part of the league's community outreach program, NBA Cares.

The event site includes a 20,000-square-foot (1,900 m^{2}) attraction venue, which is transported as a custom-built 53-foot (16 m) tractor-trailer. When converted at the site, the facility houses interactive activities and various exhibits.

=== 2010 schedule ===
NBA Nation's 2010 tour was launched in Phoenix, Arizona with stops in Denver, Los Angeles, Cleveland, New York City, Philadelphia, Minnesota, and Dallas. Each event on the tour features talent and special appearances by local NBA players and legends, mascots, dance teams, radio deejays, and performers. Throughout the tour, NBA Legend Darryl Dawkins serves as the official "NBA Nation Ambassador," joined by official host and emcee Mike Garcia (Emcee Mike) and co-host Jaclyn (Emcee Jac). Partners for the NBA Nation 2010 tour include T-Mobile USA, Kia Motors, and Sprite.

The tour itinerary for the 2010 season includes:

Date	City	Event
May 1–2, 2010	Phoenix, AZ	Cinco De Mayo Festival
May 8–9, 2010	Denver, CO	23rd Annual Cinco De Mayo “Celebrate Culture” Festival
May 22–23, 2010	Los Angeles, CA	Universal CityWalk, Hollywood
May 28–31, 2010	Cleveland, OH	Marc's Great American Rib Cook-Off and Music Festival
June 19–20, 2010	New York, NY	South Street Seaport
June 26–27, 2010	Philadelphia, PA	Taste of Philadelphia
July 2–5, 2010	St. Paul, MN	Taste of Minnesota

=== 2011 schedule ===
NBA Nation's 2010 tour tips off in Houston, Texas with stops in Denver, Los Angeles, Atlanta, Miami, San Antonio, New York City, and Washington, DC. Each event on the tour features talent and special appearances by local NBA Players and Legends, mascots, dance teams, radio DJ's, and performers. Throughout the tour, NBA Legend Darryl Dawkins serves as the official “NBA Nation Ambassador” joined by official host and emcee Mike Garcia (MC Mike). NBA Legend A.C. Green to appear at the L.A. stop.

Partners for the NBA Nation 2011 tour include T-Mobile USA, Kia Motors, and Sprite, and Dribble to Stop Diabetes.

The tour itinerary for the 2011 season includes:

Date	City	Event
April 30 - May 1, 2011	Houston, TX	Houston ifest
May 7–8, 2011	Denver, CO	Cinco De Mayo “Celebrate Culture” Festival
May 14 – 15, 2011	Los Angeles, CA	Universal Citywalk, Hollywood
May 28 – 29, 2011	Atlanta, GA	Jazz Fest
June 4 – 5, 2011	Miami, FL	Goombay Festival
June 10 – 12, 2011	San Antonio, TX	Texas Folklife Festival
June 18 – 19, 2011	New York, NY	South Street Seaport
June 25 – 26, 2011	Washington, DC	Safeway BBQ Battle
