= Outstanding Sports Personality, Studio Host =

The Sports Emmy Award for Outstanding Sports Personality, Studio Host has been awarded since 1993. The award is given to an on-air personality that hosts a pregame or postgame show, or gives news during event coverage, but does not commentate on the event itself. This award is considered to be the most prestigious of all given under the Outstanding Sports Personality category. Before this subcategory was set up, an award was given to either a studio host or an event commentator from 1968 to 1992. See that article for a list of winners (Outstanding Host or Commentator).

== List of Winners ==
Listed below are the winners of the award for each year, as well as the other nominees.

- 1993: Bob Costas (NBC)
- 1994: Bob Costas (2) (NBC)
- 1995: Bob Costas (3) (NBC)
- 1996: Bob Costas (4) (NBC)
- 1997: Dan Patrick (ESPN)
- 1998: James Brown (FOX)
- 1999: James Brown (2) (FOX)
- 2000: Bob Costas (5) (NBC)
- 2001: Bob Costas (6) (HBO) / Ernie Johnson, Jr. (TNT/TBS)
- 2002: Bob Costas (7) (NBC/HBO)
- 2003: Bob Costas (8) (NBC/HBO)
- 2004: Bob Costas (9) (NBC/HBO)
- 2005: Bob Costas (10) (NBC/HBO)
- 2006: Ernie Johnson Jr. (2) (TNT)
- 2007: James Brown (3) (CBS)
- 2008: Bob Costas (11) (NBC/HBO)
- 2009: Bob Costas (12) (NBC/MLB Network)
- 2010: Bob Costas (13) (NBC/MLB Network)
- 2011: Bob Costas (14) (NBC/MLB Network)
- 2012: Bob Costas (15) (NBC/NBC Sports Network)
- 2013: Bob Costas (16) (NBC/MLB Network)
- 2014: Ernie Johnson Jr. (3) (TNT/TBS) - gave the trophy to the family of the late Stuart Scott
- 2015: Bob Costas (17) (NBC/MLB Network)
- 2016: Bob Costas (18) (NBC/MLB Network)
- 2017: Bob Ley (ESPN)
- 2018: Ernie Johnson, Jr. (4) (TNT/CBS)
- 2019: Ernie Johnson, Jr. (5) (TNT/CBS)
- 2020: Ernie Johnson, Jr. (6) (TNT/CBS)
- 2021: Mike Tirico (NBC)
- 2022: Mike Tirico (2) (NBC)
- 2023: Mike Tirico (3) (NBC)
- 2024: Ernie Johnson, Jr. (7) (TNT/CBS)
- 2025: Ernie Johnson, Jr. (8) (TNT/CBS)

== Winners and nominees ==
Table key
‡	Indicates the winner

Year	Personalities	Network	Ref.
2017 (39th)	Bob Ley ‡	ESPN	
2017 (39th)	Rece Davis	ESPN	
2017 (39th)	Ernie Johnson Jr.	TBS/CBS/TNT/truTV	
2017 (39th)	Curt Menefee	FOX	
2017 (39th)	Dan Patrick	NBC	
2018 (40th)	Ernie Johnson Jr. ‡	TNT	
2018 (40th)	Rece Davis	ESPN	
2018 (40th)	Bob Ley	ESPN	
2018 (40th)	Curt Menefee	FOX	
2018 (40th)	Mike Tirico	NBC/Golf Channel	
2018 (40th)	Scott Van Pelt	ESPN	
2019 (41st)	Ernie Johnson Jr. ‡	TNT	
2019 (41st)	James Brown	CBS/Showtime	
2019 (41st)	Brian Kenny	MLB Network	
2019 (41st)	Mike Tirico	NBC/NBCSN	
2019 (41st)	Scott Van Pelt	ESPN	
2020 (42nd)	Ernie Johnson Jr. ‡	TNT	
2020 (42nd)	Rich Eisen	NFL Network/Peacock/NBCSN/DirecTV/B/R Live	
2020 (42nd)	Rachel Nichols	ESPN	
2020 (42nd)	Mike Tirico	NBC/NBCSN/Golf Channel	
2020 (42nd)	Scott Van Pelt	ESPN	
