= Outstanding Host or Commentator =

Emmy award for a sports broadcaster

Emmy Award Outstanding Host or Commentator
- Awarded for: Sports broadcasting
- Most awards: Jim McKay

The Emmy Award for Outstanding Host or Commentator was awarded from 1968 to 1992. It was awarded to a sports broadcaster who was best at hosting an event from a studio or commentating on an event as it was taking place. In 1981, the category's name was given a slight change to Outstanding Host or Play-by-Play. Awards like these are now given away at the Sports Emmy Awards.

== List of winners ==
=== Outstanding Host or Commentator ===
- 1967–68: Jim McKay (ABC)
- 1968–69: no award was given
- 1969–70: no award was given
- 1970–71: a tie between Jim McKay (ABC) and Don Meredith (ABC)
- 1971–72: no award was given
- 1972–73: Jim McKay (ABC)
- 1973–74: Jim McKay (ABC)
- 1974–75: Jim McKay (ABC)
- 1975–76: Jim McKay (ABC)
- 1976–77: Frank Gifford (ABC)
- 1977–78: Jack Whitaker (CBS)
- 1978–79: Jim McKay (ABC)
- 1979–80: Jim McKay (ABC)

=== Outstanding Host or Play-by-Play ===
- 1980–81: Dick Enberg (NBC)
- 1981–82: Jim McKay (ABC)
- 1982–83: Dick Enberg (NBC)
- 1983–84: no award was given
- 1984–85: George Michael (NBC)
- 1985–86: no award was given
- 1986–87: Al Michaels (ABC)
- 1987–88: Bob Costas (NBC)
- 1988: Bob Costas (NBC)
- 1989: Al Michaels (ABC)
- 1990: Dick Enberg (NBC)
- 1991: Bob Costas (NBC)
- 1992: Bob Costas (NBC)

== Multiple wins ==
9 wins

- Jim McKay

4 wins

- Bob Costas

3 wins

- Dick Enberg

2 wins

- Al Michaels
