= James Brown (sportscaster) =

American sports announcer (born 1951)

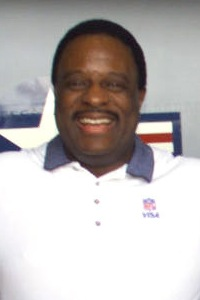
- Brown in 2000
- Born: James Talmadge Brown; February 25, 1951 (age 75); Washington, D.C., U.S.
- Other name: J.B.
- Education: Harvard University
- Occupations: Sportscaster, sport correspondent
- Employer(s): CBS, CBS Sports
- Spouse: Dorothy
- Children: 1
- Website: www.jbjamesbrown.com

James Talmadge Brown (born February 25, 1951) is an American sportscaster, currently the studio host of The James Brown Show and The NFL Today on CBS Sports. He is also a special correspondent for CBS News.

Brown started his broadcasting career in 1984, rising from television broadcasts on NBA broadcasts to work for CBS Sports, where he did play-by-play for NFL and college basketball games while also reporting for the NBA All-Star Game twice, the NBA Finals four times and the 1990 National League Championship Series. He served as a reporter for the 1992 Winter Olympics and did play-by-play for Freestyle skiing of the 1994 Winter Olympics. In 1994, he left CBS to serve as host of the pregame show for the new NFL coverage provided by Fox Sports with Fox NFL Sunday. He also would serve as lead studio host for the NHL on Fox, serving as host until 1998. Brown worked for Fox until 2005, returning to CBS, where he was brought in to serve as the host for The NFL Today.

== Early life ==
James Talmadge Brown was born on February 25, 1951, in Washington, D.C. to John and Maryann Brown. He is the nephew of famed Hollywood actor Clifton Powell. Brown attended DeMatha Catholic High School and was named to the All-Metropolitan boys basketball teams in 1967 and 1968 with teammates Sid Catlett, Steve Garrett, Aubrey Nash, and Wayne Locket. The team topped the high school national rankings that year under Coach Morgan Wootten; seven players on that squad went to Division I college teams. Brown later attended Harvard University, living in Grays Hall during his freshman year, and graduated with a degree in American government. He played for the basketball team, receiving All-Ivy League honors in his last three seasons and captaining the team as a senior. His roommate was future Harvard professor and activist Cornel West. He was drafted 62 overall by the Atlanta Hawks in 1973.

== Broadcasting career ==
=== CBS (1970s–1994) ===
After failing to make a roster spot when he tried out for the NBA's Atlanta Hawks in the mid-1970s, Brown entered the corporate world, working for such companies as Xerox and Eastman Kodak. Brown went into sports broadcasting in 1984 when he was offered a job doing Washington Bullets television broadcasts as well as an analyst job for The NBA on CBS, paired with Frank Glieber. He later moved on to an anchor position at WDVM-TV (later WUSA) in Washington and to some work at CBS Sports. Brown was rehired by CBS Sports in 1987, where he served as play-by-play announcer for the network's NFL and college basketball coverage, as well as reporter for the NBA Finals (calling games with Tom Heinsohn during the 1990 NBA Playoffs) and the 1990 National League Championship Series. He also was host of the afternoon show from the 1992 Winter Olympics and the 1994 Winter Olympics. While at CBS he also was co-host of CBS Sports Saturday/Sunday.

=== Fox, and back to CBS (1994–present) ===
In 1994, Brown accepted the position of host of the NFL on Fox pregame show. He shared the set with former football players Terry Bradshaw and Howie Long and former coach Jimmy Johnson. Cris Collinsworth and Ronnie Lott have also appeared on the program during Brown's time there.

From 1994–1998, Brown was the lead studio host for NHL on Fox. He appeared in a similar capacity in the EA Sports video game NHL '97, which used full-motion video. His voice appeared in Madden NFL 2001. On August 23, 1997, Brown filled-in for Chip Caray as the studio host for Fox Saturday Baseball.

James Brown worked for the joint HBO/Showtime pay-per-view boxing match involving Lennox Lewis and Mike Tyson.

Following the 2005 NFL season, Brown left Fox in order to rejoin CBS Sports, citing a desire to remain closer to his home in Washington, D.C.

Brown was removed from college basketball coverage for CBS after a one-year stint in 2007. However, he still hosted the college basketball pregame, halftime and postgame in the CBS studios in New York City while Greg Gumbel, the main host, was on assignment prior to Gumbel’s death in 2024.

=== Other appearances ===
Brown has also hosted The World's Funniest! (the Fox network's counterpart of America's Funniest Home Videos), Coast to Coast (a syndicated radio show formerly hosted by Bob Costas), and served as a correspondent for Real Sports with Bryant Gumbel. Brown appeared on an episode of Married... with Children in a November 24, 1996 episode titled "A Bundy Thanksgiving".

Aside from his Showtime and CBS duties, Brown hosted a weekday radio sports talk show that aired weekdays on Sporting News Radio for several years. Brown left the network in April 2006. He has since, returned to Sporting News Radio with Arnie Spanier.

In March 2009, Brown was named the Community Ambassador for AARP.

On August 10, 2009, Brown interviewed NFL quarterback Michael Vick for a segment that aired on 60 Minutes.

On March 24, 2013, Brown reported on Brian Banks in a segment titled "Blindsided: The Exoneration of Brian Banks" on 60 Minutes.

On May 14, 2013, Brown appeared onstage with the co-CEO of SAP, Bill McDermott, for McDermott's keynote speech at SAPPHIRE NOW from Orlando.

Since 2014, Brown is one of the network's substitute anchors for the CBS Evening News. Further, Brown has also contributed to CBS This Morning (now CBS Mornings), as well as CBS Sunday Morning, over the years.

In 2023, he interviewed Henry Louis Gates Jr. for a segment on the newsmagazine America in Black.

== Personal life ==
Brown resides outside of Washington, D.C. in Bethesda, Maryland, his town of birth, with his wife Dorothy and daughter Katrina. He formerly had a second residence in Century City, California, when working on FOX as their NFL program was based in Los Angeles. He was also named one of the 100 most influential student athletes by the NCAA. He has three granddaughters and one grandson, born to his daughter, Katrina and her husband John.

On May 3, 2006, Brown became a minority owner of the Washington Nationals Major League Baseball team. Brown was one of a handful of investors in the group led by Washington, D.C. real estate developer Ted Lerner.

=== Career timeline ===
- 1984–1985: NBA on CBS – Color Commentator
- 1984–1986: College Basketball on CBS – Color commentator
- 1987–1990: NBA on CBS – Sideline reporter
- 1987–1993: NFL on CBS – Play-by-play
- 1989–1990: NBA on CBS – Play-by-play
- 1990–1993, 2007: College Basketball on CBS – Play-by-play
- 1990: Major League Baseball on CBS – Sideline reporter
- 1994–2005: Fox NFL Sunday – Host
- 1994–1998: NHL on Fox – Studio host
- 2006–present: The NFL Today – Host
- 2008–2023: Inside the NFL – Host
- 2014–present: CBS Evening News – Substitute anchor
- 2017–2019: The James Brown Show – host

Preceded by First host	Fox NFL Sunday host 1994–2005	Succeeded by Joe Buck and Curt Menefee
Preceded by Greg Gumbel	The NFL Today host 2006–Present	Succeeded by Current host
Preceded by Bob Costas	Inside The NFL host 2008–2013	Succeeded by Greg Gumbel
