= Omaha Productions =

American entertainment company

- Logo of Omaha Productions
- Type: Private
- Industry: Entertainment; Sports
- Founded: 2020; 6 years ago
- Founders: Peyton Manning; Jamie Horowitz
- Parent: The North Road Company
- Website: omahaproductions.com

Omaha Productions is an American media company co-founded by former football quarterback Peyton Manning and sports executive Jamie Horowitz. It is known for producing Manningcast, an alternate live television broadcast of ESPN's Monday Night Football hosted by Peyton and his brother Eli. The company produces Netflix's Quarterback, Receiver, Starting 5, as the NFL Honors and ESPN+'s Places franchise. The company has also produced both seasons of ESPN's Full Court Press, along with shows for ABC, A&E, NBCUniversal, and Hulu, which includes the production company’s first scripted series, Chad Powers starring Glen Powell.

Additionally, Omaha has also participated in documentary work, including VICE's Calipari: Razor's Edge, chronicling John Calipari's first season at Arkansas, and ESPN's The Buddy Way about Eugene F. "Buddy" Teevens III. Omaha is also responsible for building out and producing the NFL Flag Championships, a youth flag football tournament that airs on ESPN. Building on the model established with the Manningcast, the company launched additional alternate broadcasts for the NBA, NCAA football, PGA Tour, F1, and the UFC.

== History ==
Omaha Productions was co-founded in 2020 by Peyton Manning and Jamie Horowitz. It was named after Manning's trademark audible call, "Omaha, Omaha!", that he used throughout most of his playing career. The company took over production of Peyton's Places, a football documentary series which debuted in 2019 on ESPN+, in which Peyton Manning interviews players, coaches, and celebrities. Omaha Productions also contains the Omaha Creative Agency, a full-service advertising team, which has created campaigns for major brands.

On July 19, 2021, ESPN announced that Peyton and Eli Manning would host an alternate presentation of Monday Night Football, produced by Omaha Productions. The Manningcast, as it became known, debuted on September 13, 2021, with the game between the Las Vegas Raiders and Baltimore Ravens. It airs on ESPN2 and ESPN+ and features the two brothers discussing the live game and interviewing sports guests. An initial three-year deal was signed by ESPN and Omaha Productions, and called for only ten games for each NFL season instead of the full MNF slate. On November 13, 2021, ESPN announced that the Manningcast would also be offered for the network's Monday-night Wild Card Game during the 2021 playoffs.

In February 2022, ESPN extended its contract through the 2024 NFL season, with Omaha Productions also agreeing to collaborate with ESPN on extending the format to other sports properties, such as college football, golf, and UFC events. It later extended that partnership through 2034.

In May 2023, Omaha Productions received outside investment from businessman Peter Chernin's global production studio roll-up company The North Road, increasing the value of Manning's production company to $400 million.

In March 2025, Variety reported that a minority stake in Omaha Productions was sold to Patrick Whitesell and Silver Lake, a private equity firm, valuing Omaha at over $800 million. In that same month, it was reported that Omaha Productions participated in a funding round, investing in Good Good, a golf media and entertainment company.

In April 2025, the company entered into a first-look deal with 20th Television for its scripted series and related content. Omaha Productions has a pre-existing first-look deal with ESPN for content related to sports.

== Television series ==
- Places Series
- Monday Night Football with Peyton and Eli / Manningcast (2021–present; football)
- The Grandstand (2023; motor racing)
- Full Court Press (2024; women's college basketball)
- WWE Unreal (2025–present; professional wrestling)
- Chad Powers
- Quarterback
- Receiver
- Calipari: Razor's Edge
- The Buddy Way
- UFC 278 with The Gronks
- The Final Straw
- The Breakdown with Peyton and Belichick
- Hip Hop Was Born Here
- On the Clock
- The Mega-Brands That Built America
- Beyond the Battlefield
- The American Soldier
- NFL Classics: After Further Review
- It's All Country
- Capital One College Bowl
- No Laying Up
- NBA in Stephen A's World
- History's Greatest of All Time with Peyton Manning
- College Football Primetime with The Pat McAfee Show
- King of Collectibles: The Goldin Touch
- PGA Tour Mega Cast
- NFL Pro Bowl Games
- NFL Pro Bowl Skills
- NFL Flag Championships
- NFL Honors
- ESPY Awards
- CMA Awards

=== Places Series ===
Series/Subseries	Host	Sport	Year(s)
Peyton's Places	Peyton Manning	Football	2019–present
Eli's Places	Eli Manning	College football	2021–present
Abby's Places	Abby Wambach	Soccer	2021
Rowdy's Places	Ronda Rousey	Combat sports	2022
Big Papi's Places	David Ortiz	Baseball	2022
Vince's Places	Vince Carter	Basketball	2022
Sue's Places	Sue Bird	College basketball	2022
P.K.'s Places	P.K. Subban	Hockey	2023
McEnroe's Places	John McEnroe	Tennis	2023
Stephanie's Places	Stephanie McMahon	Professional wrestling	2025
Rabil's Places	Paul Rabil	Lacrosse	2025

== Podcasts ==
- The Schrager Hour (Peter Schrager)
- SVPod (Scott Van Pelt)
- The Mina Kimes Show featuring Lenny (Mina Kimes)
- Numbers on the Board (Kenny Beecham)
- This Is Football (Kevin Clark)
- Always College Football (Greg McElroy)
- Brian Windhorst and the Hoop Collective (Brian Windhorst)

== Recognition ==
Omaha Productions’ Manningcast has won multiple Sports Emmys, receiving the award under the Outstanding Live Sports Series category in 2022 and 2024. Additionally, Peyton Manning won Sports Emmys for his work with the show in 2023 and 2025, earning the award under the Outstanding Sports Personality/Sports Event Analysis category.

In 2024, Omaha Productions was recognized by Sports Business Journal as one of the Best Places to Work in Sports, under the category of Sports Media or Production.
