= Pro Bowl =

All-star event of the National Football League (1939–2026)

Pro Bowl/Pro Bowl Honor Awards National Football League All-Star Game (1939–1942) Pro Bowl (1951–2022) Pro Bowl Games (2023–2026)
- Frequency: Annual
- Location: Varied (see text)
- Years active: 1939–2026
- Inaugurated: 1939
- Most recent: February 3, 2026 (Moscone Center, San Francisco, California)
- Participants: American Football Conference; National Football Conference
- Organizer: National Football League
- Website: probowl.com

The National Football League All-Star Game (1939–1942), Pro Bowl (1951–2022), or Pro Bowl Games (2023–2026) was an annual event held by the National Football League (NFL) featuring the league's star players.

The format changed throughout its existence. From 1939 through 1942, the NFL experimented with all-star games putting the league's champion against a team of all-stars. The first official Pro Bowl was played in January 1951, matching the top players in the American/Eastern Conference against those in the National/Western Conference. From the merger with the rival American Football League (AFL) in 1970 up through 2013 and also in 2017, it was officially called the AFC–NFC Pro Bowl, matching the top players in the American Football Conference (AFC) against those in the National Football Conference (NFC). From 2014 through 2016, the NFL experimented with a non-conferenced format, where the teams were selected by two honorary team captains (who are each in the Hall of Fame), instead of selecting players from each conference. The players were picked in a televised "schoolyard pick" prior to the game.

For years, the game suffered from lack of interest for its perceived low quality, with observers and commentators expressing their disfavor with it. It drew lower television ratings than regular season NFL games, although the game drew similar ratings to the all-star games of the other major North American sports leagues, such as the Major League Baseball All-Star Game. However, the biggest concern was to avoid injuries to the star players. The Associated Press wrote that players in the 2012 game were "hitting each other as though they were having a pillow fight". Despite these criticisms, however, players who were selected to the Pro Bowl were nonetheless honored in a similar standing to their counterparts in the other leagues, and being named to it is considered to be a significant accomplishment for any player. In September 2022, the NFL announced that the Pro Bowl game would switch to a non-contact flag football game in 2023, as well as a partnership with Peyton Manning's Omaha Productions to revamp Pro Bowl week as the "Pro Bowl Games". The Pro Bowl as an event was eventually discontinued by the NFL in 2026, though a Pro Bowl team for each conference will still be selected annually.

Unlike the other major North American sports leagues, which hold their all star weekends roughly midway through their regular seasons, the NFL held the Pro Bowl at or near the end of the season. Before the merger, the game was played annually after the NFL Championship Game. Between 1967 and 2009, the Pro Bowl was usually held the weekend after the Super Bowl. In 2010, it was moved to the Sunday before the Super Bowl; as a result, players from the two teams competing in the Super Bowl no longer participated in the Pro Bowl. When the format was changed in 2023, the skills competitions and the flag football game was held on the first Thursday and first Sunday, respectively, of February during the week before the Super Bowl. In 2026, the Pro Bowl Games were downsized into a smaller-scale event and integrated into the Super Bowl's festivities. Shortly before the 2026 season, the NFL announced that the league will no longer hold any Pro Bowl games, ending the annual event after 88 years and becoming the first of the "Big Four" professional sports leagues to end their all-star event. Instead, an official Pro Bowl class, featuring 88 players, would replace the Pro Bowl competition, with selected players invited to an in-person celebration a week before the Super Bowl.

== History ==
The first "Pro All-Star Game", featuring the all-stars of the 1938 season (as well as three players from the Los Angeles Bulldogs and Hollywood Bears, who were not members of the league), was played on January 15, 1939, at Wrigley Field in Los Angeles. The NFL All-Star Game was played again in Los Angeles in 1940 and then in New York and Philadelphia in 1941 and 1942 respectively. Although originally planned as an annual contest, the all-star game was discontinued after 1942 because of travel restrictions put in place during World War II. During the first five all-star games, an all-star team would face that year's league champion. The league champion won the first four games before the all-stars were victorious in the final game of this early series.

The concept of an all-star game was not revived until June 1950, when the newly christened "Pro Bowl" was approved. The game was sponsored by the Los Angeles Publishers Association. It was decided that the game would feature all-star teams from each of the league's two conferences rather than the league champion versus all-star format which had been used previously. This was done to avoid confusion with the Chicago College All-Star Game, an annual game which featured the league champion against a collegiate all-star team. The teams would be led by the coach of each of the conference champions. Immediately prior to the Pro Bowl, following the 1949 season, the All-America Football Conference, which contributed three teams to the NFL in a partial merger in 1950, held its own all-star game, the Shamrock Bowl.

The first 21 games of the series (1951–1972) were played in Los Angeles. The site of the game was changed annually for each of the next seven years before the game was moved to Aloha Stadium in Halawa, Hawaii, for 30 straight seasons from 1980 through 2009. The 2010 Pro Bowl was played at Sun Life Stadium, the home stadium of the Miami Dolphins and host site of Super Bowl XLIV, on January 31, the first time ever that the Pro Bowl was held before the championship game (a decision probably due to increasingly low Nielsen ratings from being regarded as an anti-climax to the Super Bowl). With the new rule being that the conference teams do not include players from the teams that will be playing in the Super Bowl, the Pro Bowl then returned to Hawaii in 2011 but was again held during the week before the Super Bowl, where it remained for three more years.

The 2012 game was met with criticism from fans and sports writers for the lack of quality play by the players. On October 24, 2012, NFL commissioner Roger Goodell had second thoughts about the Pro Bowl, telling a SiriusXM show that if the players did not play more competitively [in the 2013 Pro Bowl], he was "not inclined to play it anymore". During the ensuing off-season, the NFL Players Association lobbied to keep the Pro Bowl, and negotiated several rule changes to be implemented for the 2014 game. Among them, the teams would no longer be AFC vs. NFC, and instead be selected by captains in a fantasy draft. For the 2014 game, Jerry Rice and Deion Sanders were chosen as alumni captains, while their captains were Drew Brees and Robert Quinn (Rice), along with Jamaal Charles and J. J. Watt (Sanders).

On April 9, 2014, the NFL announced that the 2015 Pro Bowl would be played the week before the Super Bowl at University of Phoenix Stadium in Glendale, Arizona, on January 25, 2015. The game returned to Hawaii in 2016, and the "unconferenced" format was its last.

For 2017, the league considered hosting the game at Maracanã Stadium in Rio de Janeiro, Brazil, which would have been the first time the game had been hosted outside the United States. The NFL was also considering future Pro Bowls in Mexico and Germany to leverage international markets. A report released May 19, 2016, indicated that the 2017 Pro Bowl would instead be hosted at a newly renovated Camping World Stadium in Orlando, Florida; Orlando beat out Brazil (which apparently did not make the final round of voting), Honolulu, Super Bowl host site Houston, and a bid from Sydney, Australia, for the hosting rights. On June 1, 2016, the league announced that it was restoring the old conference format.

Since the 2017 Pro Bowl, the NFL has also hosted a series of side events leading up to the game called the Pro Bowl Skills Showdown, which includes competitions like passing contests and dodgeball among the players.

The 2021 Pro Bowl game was canceled due to the COVID-19 pandemic, and new host Allegiant Stadium in Las Vegas was held over to the 2022 Pro Bowl. The roster was still voted on and named, and alternative broadcast and streaming events were held during the week that the game was originally scheduled (including a Madden NFL 21 multiplayer game played using the Pro Bowl rosters, controlled by teams of players and celebrity guests).

In May 2022, Commissioner Roger Goodell questioned the future of the Pro Bowl, arguing that it "doesn't work", and that "another way to celebrate the players" was needed. On September 26, 2022, it was announced that the NFL would revamp the 2023 event as "The Pro Bowl Games" in partnership with Peyton Manning's Omaha Productions; the event was reformatted to consist of the two teams competing to earn points across a series of skills challenges, and a series of flag football games held on the culminating Sunday (with all points scored across the prior events carried into the final flag football game) to determine the winner.

In October 2025, it was announced that the 2026 Pro Bowl Games would be integrated into the Super Bowl's festivities rather than be a standalone event, with the 2026 edition scheduled to be held on the Tuesday prior to Super Bowl LX at Moscone Center (which also hosted the Super Bowl Experience). The change to a smaller-scale event during Super Bowl week was intended to make the Pro Bowl a television-oriented event.

On August 26, 2026, The Athletic reported that the NFL was ending the Pro Bowl as an annual event. However, a Pro Bowl team consisting of 88 players will still be selected each season under the same format, and all players selected to the team will be invited to a ceremony after the season to be honored.

== Player selection ==
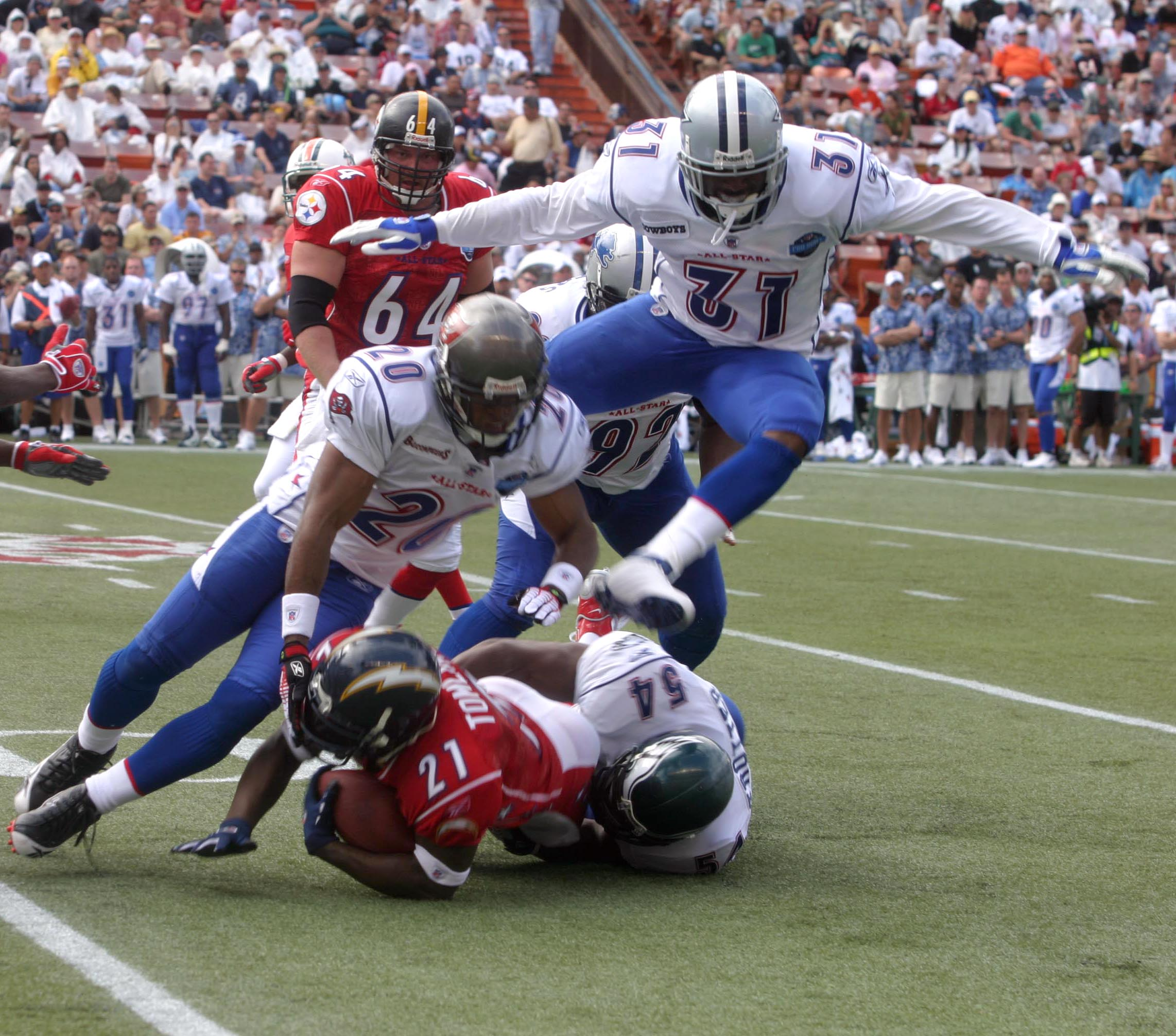
Jeremiah Trotter tackling Ladainian Tomlinson during the 2006 Pro Bowl in Hawaii

Players are voted into the Pro Bowl by the coaches, the players themselves, and the fans. Each group's ballots count for ⅓, or 33.3%, of the votes. Fans vote on their preferred players at NFL.com. Replacements are selected should any selected player be unable to play for injuries, self-withdrawal, or Super Bowl contention. Prior to 1995, only the coaches and the players made Pro Bowl selections.

In order to be considered a Pro Bowler for a given year, a player must either have been one of the initial players selected to the team, or a player who accepts an invitation to the Pro Bowl as an alternate; invited alternates who decline to attend are not considered Pro Bowlers. Since 2010, players of the two teams that advance to the Super Bowl will not play in the Pro Bowl, and they are replaced by alternate players. Players who would have been invited as an alternate but could not play because they were slated to play in that season's Super Bowl are also considered Pro Bowlers (for example, Tom Brady in 2016).

From 2014 to 2016, the Pro Bowl used a fantasy draft format, in which the two teams were drafted by a pair of team captains.

== Coaching staff ==
When the Pro Bowl was held after the Super Bowl, the head coaches were traditionally the head coaches of the teams that lost in the AFC and NFC championship games for the same season of the Pro Bowl in question. From 1978 through 1982, the head coaches of the highest ranked divisional champion that lost in the Divisional Playoff Round were chosen. For the 1983 Pro Bowl, the NFL resumed selecting the losing head coaches in the conference championship games. In the 1999 Pro Bowl, New York Jets head coach Bill Parcells, after his team lost to the Denver Broncos in the AFC Championship Game, had to decline for health reasons and Jets assistant head coach Bill Belichick took his place.

When the Pro Bowl was moved to the weekend between the Conference Championship games and the Super Bowl in 2009, the team that lost in the Divisional Playoff Round with the best regular season record would have their coaching staffs lead their respective conference Pro Bowl team returning to the format used from 1978 to 1982. It remained that way through 2013; it resumed in 2017. If the losing teams of each conference had the same regular season record the coaches from the higher-seeded team will get the Pro Bowl honor. From 2014 to 2016, the Pro Bowl coaches came from the two teams with the best records that lost in the Divisional Playoffs. (In the 2015 Pro Bowl, when John Fox left his coaching job with Denver after his playoff loss to Indianapolis that year, John Harbaugh of Baltimore took over. The next year saw Green Bay's assistant coach Winston Moss took over as Mike McCarthy resigned from coaching for illness.)

After changing to the Pro Bowl Games format in 2022, Manningcast hosts Peyton Manning and Eli Manning served as the "honorary" coaches for the AFC and NFC respectively. Peyton spent his entire playing career exclusively in the AFC with the Indianapolis Colts and Denver Broncos, while Eli played his whole career with the New York Giants in the NFC.

== Game honors ==
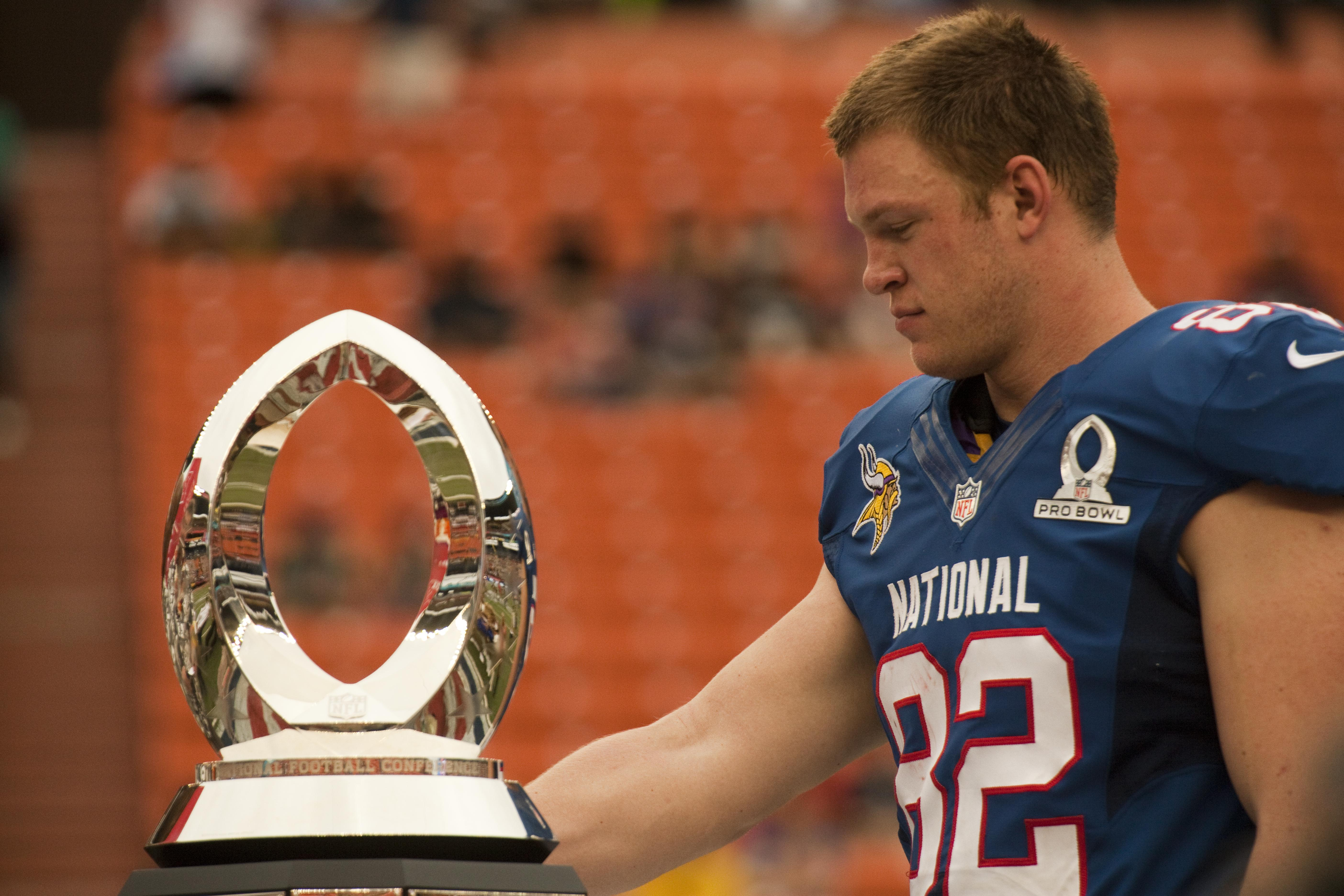
Kyle Rudolph with the Pro Bowl MVP trophy in 2013.

A Player of the Game was honored 1951–1956. 1957–1971, awards were presented to both an Outstanding Back and an Outstanding Lineman. In 1972 and since 2014, there are awards for both an Outstanding Offensive Player and an Outstanding Defensive Player. 1973–2007, only one Player of the Game award was honored (though thrice this award has been presented to multiple players in a single game). In 2008 the award was changed to Most Valuable Player (MVP).

Players are paid for participating in the game with the winning team receiving a larger payout. The chart below shows how much the players of their respective teams earn:

| Years | Winners | Losers |
|---|---|---|
| 1951-2010 | $23,000 | $17,000 |
| 2011/2013 | $50,000 | $25,000 |
| 2012 | $65,000 | $40,000 |
| 2014 | $53,000 | $26,000 |
| 2015-16 | $55,000 | $28,000 |
| 2017 | $61,000 | $30,000 |
| 2018 | $64,000 | $32,000 |
| 2019 | $67,000 | $39,000 |
| 2020 | $74,000 | $37,000 |
| 2022–23 | $84,000 | $42,000 |
| 2024 | $88,000 | $44,000 |
| 2025 | $92,000 | $46,000 |
| 2026 | $96,000 | $48,000 |

== Rule differences ==
Although there is no official rule against tackling, the players in the Pro Bowl have come to a gentlemen's agreement to do little if any tackling. On the vast majority of plays, the ball carrier either gives up as soon as a defensive player grabs him, or goes out of bounds to avoid contact. In that sense it is essentially a two-hand touch football game.

In addition to the above, the Pro Bowl does have different rules from regular NFL games to make the game safer with a view towards incorporating some of these rules to future NFL regular season games.

- No motion or shifting by the offense
- Offense must have a running back and tight end in all formations
- Offense may have up to three receivers on the same side
- Intentional grounding is legal
- No rushing the passer
- More than one forward pass thrown on the same play is allowed
- Defense must run a 4–3 at all times, though the Cover 2 and press coverage is allowed
- No blitz; DEs and tackles can rush on passing plays, provided they are on same side of ball
- No blindside or below the waist blocks
- No rushing the punter
- No rushing the kicker
- No rushing the holder
- Coin toss determines who receives first; loser receives to start third period. Procedure repeats at the start of first overtime.
- Kickoffs are eliminated (including free kicks)
- Punt returns are eliminated by the automatic fair catch
- Teams will start on their own 25-yard line after any score or at the start of each half/odd overtime
- If a team that would otherwise be kicking off wants to attempt to retain possession (situations where an onside kick would be attempted if there were kickoffs), they may run a single scrimmage play from their own 25-yard line; should the ball be advanced 15 yards forward, the team retains possession
- Receivers may flinch or raise either foot without incurring penalty
- 35-second play clock to run plays
- Deep middle safety must be aligned within hash marks
- Replay reviews are allowed
- 44-player roster per team
- Two-minute warning in effect for all quarters, plus overtime
- Game clock runs on incompletions except at two minutes left in half or overtime period
- Very limited contact is allowed much like touch football, provided the ball carrier is surrounded by opponents

In case of a tie after regulation, multiple 15-minute OT periods will be played (with each team receiving two time-outs per period), and in the first overtime teams receive one possession to score unless one of them scores a safety on its first possession. True sudden death rules apply thereafter if both teams have had their initial possession and the game remains tied. The Pro Bowl is not allowed to end in a tie, unlike preseason and regular season games. (In general, beyond the first overtime, whoever scores first wins. The first overtime starts as if the game had started over, like the NFL Playoffs.)

In the Pro Bowl Games format, the AFC and NFC teams earn points during skills competitions held over Pro Bowl week. During the Pro Bowl proper in 2023, three flag football games were played; the first two games were worth six points each for the winning team (and being split in the event of a tie). All points earned are carried into the final flag football game; whichever team has the highest point total after the final game was declared the winner of the Pro Bowl Games. In 2024, this was replaced by a single flag football game; similarly to 2023, scores from the first set of skills challenges were carried into the game, while other challenges were interspersed between quarters.

The flag games are played on a 50-yard by 28-yard field (like arena football) with seven players per team on the field. The games consist of two 10-minute halves and a 15-minute halftime. Teams can elect to attempt a 1 point conversion from the 5 yard line or a 2 point conversion from the 10 yard line. In overtime, no matter if a touchdown is scored or not, teams get one possession. If the teams are tied after one possession, true sudden death rules apply. Teams can elect to "punt" on fourth down, which places the ball at the opponent's 5 yard line.

== Pro Bowl uniforms ==
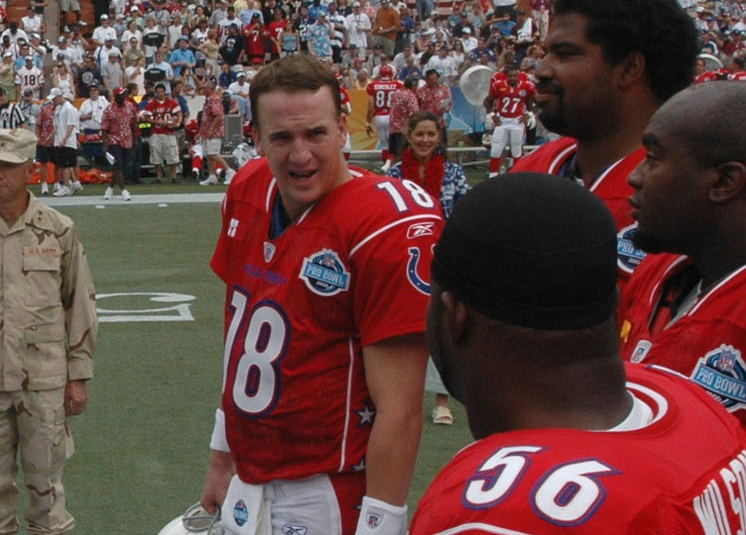
Quarterback Peyton Manning (#18) before the 2006 Pro Bowl.

The teams comprise players from different NFL teams, so using their own uniforms would be too confusing. However, the players do wear the helmet of their respective team, but the home jerseys and pants are either a solid blue for the NFC or solid red for the AFC, with white jerseys with blue or red accents, respectively, for the away team.

The early Pro Bowl, contested by the National Football League's Eastern and Western Division stars and played at the Los Angeles Memorial Coliseum, featured the same uniforms from the 1950s to mid-1960s; the Eastern team wore scarlet jerseys with white numerals and a white crescent shoulder stripe, white pants with red stripe, red socks, and a plain red helmet. The Western team wore white jerseys with royal-blue numerals and a Northwestern University-style Ukon triple stripe on the sleeves, white pants with blue stripe and socks and a plain blue helmet. Perhaps oddly, the Eastern team wore home dark jerseys, although the host city team, the Los Angeles Rams, were members of the Western Conference. From January 1967 to January 1970 both teams wore gold helmets with the NFL logo on the sides; the Eastern helmets featured a red-white-red tri-stripe and the Western a similar blue-white-blue tri-stripe. In fact, the players brought their own game helmets to Los Angeles, which were then spray-painted and decorated for the contest. For the 1970 game the helmets featured the '50 NFL' logo, commemorating the league's half-century anniversary.

In the earliest years of the AFC–NFC Pro Bowl, the players did not wear their unique helmets. The AFC All-Stars wore a solid red helmet with a white A on it, while the NFC players wore a solid white helmet with a blue N on it. The AFC's red helmets were paired with white jerseys and red pants, while the NFC's white helmets were paired with blue jerseys and white pants. Beginning with the 1979 game, players wore the helmets of their respective teams.

Two players with the same number who were selected for the Pro Bowl could wear the same number for that game, which was not always the case in the past.

The 2008 Pro Bowl included a unique example of several players from the same team wearing the same number in a Pro Bowl. For the game, Washington Redskins players T Chris Samuels, TE Chris Cooley, and LS Ethan Albright all wore the number 21 (a number normally inappropriate for their positions) in memory of their teammate Sean Taylor, who had been murdered during the 2007 season.

On October 7, 2013, Nike unveiled the uniforms for the 2014 Pro Bowl, which revealed that the red, white and blue colors that the game uniforms bore throughout its entire history would not be used for the game. As the NFC–AFC format was not used between 2014 through 2016, team 1 sported a white uniform with bright orange and team 2 sported a gray uniform with volt green. The new uniforms received mixed reviews from fans and sports columnists alike, one even mentioning that the game would look like an "Oregon vs. Oklahoma State" game.

Since 2017, when the conference format was restored, the league took an approach similar to the NFL Color Rush initiative, in which jerseys, pants, and socks were all a uniform color (red for the AFC, blue for the NFC).

With the switch to the Pro Bowl Games format in 2023, players are no longer required to wear standard football uniforms, helmets and pads. Instead they wore red (for AFC) or blue (for NFC) shirts and either gray shorts or pants. Some players would also wear caps as headgear and compression tights.

== Game results ==
=== NFL All-Star Games (1938–1942) ===
No Most Valuable Player awards were presented during these games.

| Season | Date | Score | Venue | Attendance | Head coaches |
|---|---|---|---|---|---|
| 1938 | January 15, 1939 | New York Giants 13, NFL All-Stars 10 | Wrigley Field | 15,000 | AS: Ray Flaherty (Washington) and Gus Henderson (Detroit); NYG: Steve Owen |
| 1939 | January 14, 1940 | Green Bay Packers 16, NFL All-Stars 7 | Gilmore Stadium | 18,000 | AS: Steve Owen (New York); GB: Curly Lambeau |
| 1940 | December 29, 1940 | Chicago Bears 28, NFL All-Stars 14 | Gilmore Stadium | 21,624 | AS: Ray Flaherty (Washington); CHI: George Halas |
| 1941 | January 4, 1942 | Chicago Bears 35, NFL All-Stars 24 | Polo Grounds | 17,725 | AS: Steve Owen (New York); CHI: George Halas |
| 1942 | December 27, 1942 | NFL All-Stars 17, Washington Redskins 14 | Shibe Park | 18,671 | AS: Hunk Anderson (Chicago Bears); WAS: Ray Flaherty |
No game was played from 1943 to 1950.

=== NFL Pro Bowls (1950–1969) ===
| Season | Date | Score | Series | Most Valuable Players | Venue | Attendance | Head coaches | Network |
|---|---|---|---|---|---|---|---|---|
| 1950 | January 14, 1951 | American Conference 28, National Conference 27 | AC, 1–0 | Otto Graham, Cleveland Browns, Quarterback | Los Angeles Memorial Coliseum | 53,676 | AC: Paul Brown, Cleveland; NC: Joe Stydahar, Los Angeles | |
| 1951 | January 12, 1952 | National Conference 30, American Conference 13 | Tied, 1–1 | Dan Towler, Los Angeles Rams, Running back | Los Angeles Memorial Coliseum | 19,400 | AC: Paul Brown, Cleveland; NC: Joe Stydahar, Los Angeles | NBC |
| 1952 | January 10, 1953 | National Conference 27, American Conference 7 | NC, 2–1 | Don Doll, Detroit Lions, Defensive back | Los Angeles Memorial Coliseum | 34,208 | AC: Paul Brown, Cleveland; NC: Buddy Parker, Detroit | NBC |
| 1953 | January 17, 1954 | East 20, West 9 | Tied, 2–2 | Chuck Bednarik, Philadelphia Eagles, Linebacker | Los Angeles Memorial Coliseum | 44,214 | EC: Paul Brown, Cleveland; WC: Buddy Parker, Detroit | DuMont |
| 1954 | January 16, 1955 | West 26, East 19 | West, 3–2 | Billy Wilson, San Francisco 49ers, End | Los Angeles Memorial Coliseum | 43,972 | EC: Jim Trimble, Philadelphia; WC: Buck Shaw, San Francisco | |
| 1955 | January 15, 1956 | East 31, West 30 | Tied, 3–3 | Ollie Matson, Chicago Cardinals, Running back | Los Angeles Memorial Coliseum | 37,867 | EC: Joe Kuharich, Washington; WC: Sid Gillman, Los Angeles | |
| 1956 | January 13, 1957 | West 19, East 10 | West, 4–3 | Back: Bert Rechichar, Baltimore Colts; Lineman: Ernie Stautner, Pittsburgh Steelers | Los Angeles Memorial Coliseum | 44,177 | EC: Jim Lee Howell, New York; WC: Paddy Driscoll, Chicago Bears | |
| 1957 | January 12, 1958 | West 26, East 7 | West, 5–3 | Back: Hugh McElhenny, San Francisco 49ers Lineman: Gene Brito, Washington Redskins | Los Angeles Memorial Coliseum | 66,634 | EC: Buddy Parker, Pittsburgh; WC: George Wilson, Detroit | NBC |
| 1958 | January 11, 1959 | East 28, West 21 | West, 5–4 | Back: Frank Gifford, New York Giants; Lineman: Doug Atkins, Chicago Bears | Los Angeles Memorial Coliseum | 72,250 | EC: Jim Lee Howell, New York; WC: Weeb Ewbank, Baltimore | NBC |
| 1959 | January 17, 1960 | West 38, East 21 | West, 6–4 | Back: Johnny Unitas, Baltimore Colts; Lineman: Eugene "Big Daddy" Lipscomb, Baltimore Colts | Los Angeles Memorial Coliseum | 56,876 | EC: Buck Shaw, Philadelphia; WC: Red Hickey, San Francisco | NBC |
| 1960 | January 15, 1961 | West 35, East 31 | West, 7–4 | Back: Johnny Unitas, Baltimore Colts; Lineman: Sam Huff, New York Giants | Los Angeles Memorial Coliseum | 62,971 | EC: Buck Shaw, Philadelphia; WC: Vince Lombardi, Green Bay | NBC |
| 1961 | January 14, 1962 | West 31, East 30 | West, 8–4 | Back: Jim Brown, Cleveland Browns; Lineman: Henry Jordan, Green Bay Packers | Los Angeles Memorial Coliseum | 57,409 | EC: Allie Sherman, New York; WC: Norm Van Brocklin, Minnesota | NBC |
| 1962 | January 13, 1963 | East 30, West 20 | West, 8–5 | Back: Jim Brown, Cleveland Browns; Lineman: Eugene Lipscomb, Pittsburgh Steelers | Los Angeles Memorial Coliseum | 61,374 | EC: Allie Sherman, New York; WC: Vince Lombardi, Green Bay | NBC |
| 1963 | January 12, 1964 | West 31, East 17 | West, 9–5 | Back: Johnny Unitas, Baltimore Colts; Lineman: Gino Marchetti, Baltimore Colts | Los Angeles Memorial Coliseum | 67,242 | EC: Allie Sherman, New York; WC: George Halas, Chicago | NBC |
| 1964 | January 10, 1965 | West 34, East 14 | West, 10–5 | Back: Fran Tarkenton, Minnesota Vikings; Lineman: Terry Barr, Detroit Lions | Los Angeles Memorial Coliseum | 60,598 | EC: Blanton Collier, Cleveland; WC: Don Shula, Baltimore | NBC |
| 1965 | January 16, 1966 | East 36, West 7 | West, 10–6 | Back: Jim Brown, Cleveland Browns; Lineman: Dale Meinert, St. Louis Cardinals | Los Angeles Memorial Coliseum | 60,124 | EC: Blanton Collier, Cleveland; WC: Vince Lombardi, Green Bay | CBS |
| 1966 | January 22, 1967 | East 20, West 10 | West, 10–7 | Back: Gale Sayers, Chicago Bears; Lineman: Floyd Peters, Philadelphia Eagles | Los Angeles Memorial Coliseum | 15,062 | EC: Tom Landry, Dallas; WC: George Allen, Los Angeles | CBS |
| 1967 | January 21, 1968 | West 38, East 20 | West, 11–7 | Back: Gale Sayers, Chicago Bears; Lineman: Dave Robinson, Green Bay Packers | Los Angeles Memorial Coliseum | 53,289 | EC:Otto Graham, Washington; WC: Don Shula, Baltimore | CBS |
| 1968 | January 19, 1969 | West 10, East 7 | West, 12–7 | Back: Roman Gabriel, Los Angeles Rams; Lineman: Merlin Olsen, Los Angeles Rams | Los Angeles Memorial Coliseum | 32,050 | EC: Tom Landry, Dallas; WC: George Allen, Los Angeles | CBS |
| 1969 | January 18, 1970 | West 16, East 13 | West, 13–7 | Back: Gale Sayers, Chicago Bears; Lineman: George Andrie, Dallas Cowboys | Los Angeles Memorial Coliseum | 57,786 | EC: Tom Fears, New Orleans; WC: Norm Van Brocklin, Atlanta | CBS |

=== AFC–NFC Pro Bowls (1970–2012) ===
| Season | Date | Score | Series | Most Valuable Player(s) | Venue | Attendance | Head coaches | Network |
|---|---|---|---|---|---|---|---|---|
| 1970 | January 24, 1971 | NFC, 27–6 | NFC, 1–0 | Lineman: Fred Carr, Packers; Back: Mel Renfro, Cowboys | Los Angeles Memorial Coliseum | 48,222 | AFC: John Madden, Oakland; NFC: Dick Nolan, San Francisco | CBS |
| 1971 | January 23, 1972 | AFC, 26–13 | Tied, 1–1 | Defense: Willie Lanier, Chiefs; Offense: Jan Stenerud, Chiefs | Los Angeles Memorial Coliseum | 53,647 | AFC: Don McCafferty, Baltimore; NFC: Dick Nolan, San Francisco | NBC |
| 1972 | January 21, 1973 | AFC, 33–28 | AFC, 2–1 | O. J. Simpson, Bills, Running back | Texas Stadium | 37,091 | AFC: Chuck Noll, Pittsburgh; NFC: Tom Landry, Dallas | CBS |
| 1973 | January 20, 1974 | AFC, 15–13 | AFC, 3–1 | Garo Yepremian, Dolphins, Placekicker | Arrowhead Stadium | 66,918 | AFC: John Madden, Oakland; NFC: Tom Landry, Dallas | NBC |
| 1974 | January 20, 1975 | NFC, 17–10 | AFC, 3–2 | James Harris, Rams, Quarterback | Miami Orange Bowl | 26,484 | AFC: John Madden, Oakland; NFC: Chuck Knox, Los Angeles | ABC |
| 1975 | January 26, 1976 | NFC, 23–20 | Tied, 3–3 | Billy Johnson, Oilers, Kick returner | Louisiana Superdome | 30,546 | AFC: John Madden, Oakland; NFC: Chuck Knox, Los Angeles | ABC |
| 1976 | January 17, 1977 | AFC, 24–14 | AFC, 4–3 | Mel Blount, Steelers, Cornerback | The Kingdome | 64,752 | AFC: Chuck Noll, Pittsburgh; NFC: Chuck Knox, Los Angeles | ABC |
| 1977 | January 23, 1978 | NFC, 14–13 | Tied, 4–4 | Walter Payton, Bears, Running back | Tampa Stadium | 51,337 | AFC: Ted Marchibroda, Baltimore; NFC: Chuck Knox, Los Angeles | ABC |
| 1978 | January 29, 1979 | NFC, 13–7 | NFC, 5–4 | Ahmad Rashad, Vikings, Wide receiver | Los Angeles Memorial Coliseum | 46,281 | AFC: Chuck Fairbanks, New England; NFC: Bud Grant, Minnesota | ABC |
| 1979 | January 27, 1980 | NFC, 37–27 | NFC, 6–4 | Chuck Muncie, Saints, Running back | Aloha Stadium | 49,800 | AFC: Don Coryell, San Diego; NFC: Tom Landry, Dallas | ABC |
| 1980 | February 1, 1981 | NFC, 21–7 | NFC, 7–4 | Eddie Murray, Lions, Placekicker | Aloha Stadium | 50,360 | AFC: Sam Rutigliano, Cleveland; NFC: Leeman Bennett, Atlanta | ABC |
| 1981 | January 31, 1982 | AFC, 16–13 | NFC, 7–5 | Lee Roy Selmon, Buccaneers, Defensive end Kellen Winslow, Chargers, Tight end | Aloha Stadium | 50,402 | AFC: Don Shula, Miami; NFC: John McKay, Tampa Bay | ABC |
| 1982 | February 6, 1983 | NFC, 20–19 | NFC, 8–5 | Dan Fouts, Chargers, Quarterback; John Jefferson, Packers, Wide receiver | Aloha Stadium | 49,883 | AFC: Walt Michaels, New York Jets; NFC: Tom Landry, Dallas | ABC |
| 1983 | January 29, 1984 | NFC, 45–3 | NFC, 9–5 | Joe Theismann, Redskins, Quarterback | Aloha Stadium | 50,445 | AFC: Chuck Knox, Seattle; NFC: Bill Walsh, San Francisco | ABC |
| 1984 | January 27, 1985 | AFC, 22–14 | NFC, 9–6 | Mark Gastineau, Jets, Defensive end | Aloha Stadium | 50,385 | AFC: Chuck Noll, Pittsburgh; NFC: Mike Ditka, Chicago | ABC |
| 1985 | February 2, 1986 | NFC, 28–24 | NFC, 10–6 | Phil Simms, Giants, Quarterback | Aloha Stadium | 50,101 | AFC: Don Shula, Miami; NFC: John Robinson, L.A. Rams | ABC |
| 1986 | February 1, 1987 | AFC, 10–6 | NFC, 10–7 | Reggie White, Eagles, Defensive end | Aloha Stadium | 50,101 | AFC: Marty Schottenheimer, Cleveland; NFC: Joe Gibbs, Washington | ABC |
| 1987 | February 7, 1988 | AFC, 15–6 | NFC, 10–8 | Bruce Smith, Bills, Defensive end | Aloha Stadium | 50,113 | AFC: Marty Schottenheimer, Cleveland; NFC: Jerry Burns, Minnesota | ESPN |
| 1988 | January 29, 1989 | NFC, 34–3 | NFC, 11–8 | Randall Cunningham, Eagles, Quarterback | Aloha Stadium | 50,113 | AFC: Marv Levy, Buffalo; NFC: Mike Ditka, Chicago | ESPN |
| 1989 | February 4, 1990 | NFC, 27–21 | NFC, 12–8 | Jerry Gray, Rams, Cornerback | Aloha Stadium | 50,445 | AFC: Bud Carson, Cleveland; NFC: John Robinson, L.A. Rams | ESPN |
| 1990 | February 3, 1991 | AFC, 23–21 | NFC, 12–9 | Jim Kelly, Bills, Quarterback | Aloha Stadium | 50,345 | AFC: Art Shell, L.A. Raiders; NFC: George Seifert, San Francisco | ESPN |
| 1991 | February 2, 1992 | NFC, 21–15 | NFC, 13–9 | Michael Irvin, Cowboys, Wide receiver | Aloha Stadium | 50,209 | AFC: Dan Reeves, Denver; NFC: Wayne Fontes, Detroit | ESPN |
| 1992 | February 7, 1993 | AFC, 23–20 (OT) | NFC, 13–10 | Steve Tasker, Bills, Special teams | Aloha Stadium | 50,007 | AFC: Don Shula, Miami; NFC: George Seifert, San Francisco | ESPN |
| 1993 | February 6, 1994 | NFC, 17–3 | NFC, 14–10 | Andre Rison, Falcons, Wide receiver | Aloha Stadium | 50,026 | AFC: Marty Schottenheimer, Kansas City; NFC: George Seifert, San Francisco | ESPN |
| 1994 | February 5, 1995 | AFC, 41–13 | NFC, 14–11 | Marshall Faulk, Colts, Running back | Aloha Stadium | 49,121 | AFC: Bill Cowher, Pittsburgh; NFC: Barry Switzer, Dallas | ABC |
| 1995 | February 4, 1996 | NFC, 20–13 | NFC, 15–11 | Jerry Rice, 49ers, Wide receiver | Aloha Stadium | 50,034 | AFC: Ted Marchibroda, Indianapolis; NFC: Mike Holmgren, Green Bay | ABC |
| 1996 | February 2, 1997 | AFC, 26–23 (OT) | NFC, 15–12 | Mark Brunell, Jaguars, Quarterback | Aloha Stadium | 50,031 | AFC: Tom Coughlin, Jacksonville; NFC: Dom Capers, Carolina | ABC |
| 1997 | February 1, 1998 | AFC, 29–24 | NFC, 15–13 | Warren Moon, Seahawks, Quarterback | Aloha Stadium | 49,995 | AFC: Bill Cowher, Pittsburgh; NFC: Steve Mariucci, San Francisco | ABC |
| 1998 | February 7, 1999 | AFC, 23–10 | NFC, 15–14 | Keyshawn Johnson, Jets, Wide receiver Ty Law, Patriots, Cornerback | Aloha Stadium | 50,075 | AFC: Bill Belichick, N.Y. Jets; NFC: Dennis Green, Minnesota | ABC |
| 1999 | February 6, 2000 | NFC, 51–31 | NFC, 16–14 | Randy Moss, Vikings, Wide receiver | Aloha Stadium | 50,112 | AFC: Tom Coughlin, Jacksonville; NFC: Tony Dungy, Tampa Bay | ABC |
| 2000 | February 4, 2001 | AFC, 38–17 | NFC, 16–15 | Rich Gannon, Raiders, Quarterback | Aloha Stadium | 50,128 | AFC: Jon Gruden, Oakland; NFC: Dennis Green, Minnesota | ABC |
| 2001 | February 9, 2002 | AFC, 38–30 | Tied, 16–16 | Rich Gannon, Raiders, Quarterback | Aloha Stadium | 50,301 | AFC: Bill Cowher, Pittsburgh; NFC: Andy Reid, Philadelphia | ABC |
| 2002 | February 2, 2003 | AFC, 45–20 | AFC, 17–16 | Ricky Williams, Dolphins, Running back | Aloha Stadium | 50,125 | AFC: Jeff Fisher, Tennessee; NFC: Andy Reid, Philadelphia | ABC |
| 2003 | February 8, 2004 | NFC, 55–52 | Tied, 17–17 | Marc Bulger, Rams, Quarterback | Aloha Stadium | 50,127 | AFC: Tony Dungy, Indianapolis; NFC: Andy Reid, Philadelphia | ESPN |
| 2004 | February 13, 2005 | AFC, 38–27 | AFC, 18–17 | Peyton Manning, Colts, Quarterback | Aloha Stadium | 50,225 | AFC: Bill Cowher, Pittsburgh; NFC: Jim L. Mora, Atlanta | ESPN |
| 2005 | February 12, 2006 | NFC 23–17 | Tied, 18–18 | Derrick Brooks, Buccaneers, Linebacker | Aloha Stadium | 50,190 | AFC: Mike Shanahan, Denver; NFC: John Fox, Carolina | ESPN |
| 2006 | February 10, 2007 | AFC 31–28 | AFC, 19–18 | Carson Palmer, Bengals, Quarterback | Aloha Stadium | 50,410 | AFC: Bill Belichick, New England; NFC: Sean Payton, New Orleans | CBS |
| 2007 | February 10, 2008 | NFC 42–30 | Tied, 19–19 | Adrian Peterson, Vikings, Running back | Aloha Stadium | 50,044 | AFC: Norv Turner, San Diego; NFC: Mike McCarthy, Green Bay | Fox |
| 2008 | February 8, 2009 | NFC 30–21 | NFC, 20–19 | Larry Fitzgerald, Cardinals, Wide receiver | Aloha Stadium | 49,958 | AFC: John Harbaugh, Baltimore; NFC: Andy Reid, Philadelphia | NBC |
| 2009 | January 31, 2010 | AFC 41–34 | Tied, 20–20 | Matt Schaub, Texans, Quarterback | Sun Life Stadium | 70,697 | AFC: Norv Turner, San Diego; NFC: Wade Phillips, Dallas | ESPN |
| 2010 | January 30, 2011 | NFC 55–41 | NFC, 21–20 | DeAngelo Hall, Redskins, Cornerback | Aloha Stadium | 49,338 | AFC: Bill Belichick, New England; NFC: Mike Smith, Atlanta | Fox |
| 2011 | January 29, 2012 | AFC 59–41 | Tied, 21–21 | Brandon Marshall, Dolphins, Wide receiver | Aloha Stadium | 48,423 | AFC: Gary Kubiak, Houston; NFC: Mike McCarthy, Green Bay | NBC |
| 2012 | January 27, 2013 | NFC 62–35 | NFC, 22–21 | Kyle Rudolph, Vikings, Tight end | Aloha Stadium | 47,134 | AFC: John Fox, Denver; NFC: Mike McCarthy, Green Bay | NBC |

=== Unconferenced Pro Bowls (2013–2015) ===
| Season | Date | Score | Most Valuable Player(s) | Venue | Attendance | Head coaches | Network |
|---|---|---|---|---|---|---|---|
| 2013 | January 26, 2014 | Team Rice 22, Team Sanders 21 | Offense: Nick Foles, Eagles, Quarterback; Defense: Derrick Johnson, Chiefs, Linebacker | Aloha Stadium | 47,270 | Rice: Ron Rivera, Carolina; Sanders: Chuck Pagano, Indianapolis | NBC |
| 2014 | January 25, 2015 | Team Irvin 32, Team Carter 28 | Offense: Matthew Stafford, Lions, Quarterback; Defense: J. J. Watt, Texans, Defensive end | University of Phoenix Stadium | 63,225 | Irvin: Jason Garrett, Dallas; Carter: John Harbaugh, Baltimore | ESPN |
| 2015 | January 31, 2016 | Team Irvin 49, Team Rice 27 | Offense: Russell Wilson, Seahawks, Quarterback; Defense: Michael Bennett, Seahawks, Defensive end | Aloha Stadium | 50,000 | Irvin: Winston Moss, Green Bay; Rice: Andy Reid, Kansas City | ESPN |

=== AFC–NFC Pro Bowls (2016–2019) ===
| Season | Date | Score | Series | Most Valuable Player(s) | Venue | Attendance | Head coaches | Network |
|---|---|---|---|---|---|---|---|---|
| 2016 | January 29, 2017 | AFC 20–13 | Tied, 22–22 | Offensive: Travis Kelce, Kansas City Chiefs, Tight end Defensive: Lorenzo Alexander, Buffalo Bills, Linebacker | Camping World Stadium | 60,834 | AFC: Andy Reid, Kansas City; NFC: Jason Garrett, Dallas | ESPN |
| 2017 | January 28, 2018 | AFC 24–23 | AFC, 23–22 | Offensive: Delanie Walker, Tennessee Titans, Tight end Defensive: Von Miller, Denver Broncos, Linebacker | Camping World Stadium | 51,019 | AFC: Mike Tomlin, Pittsburgh; NFC: Sean Payton, New Orleans | ESPN/ABC |
| 2018 | January 27, 2019 | AFC 26–7 | AFC, 24–22 | Offensive: Patrick Mahomes, Kansas City Chiefs, Quarterback; Defensive: Jamal Adams, New York Jets, Safety | Camping World Stadium | 57,875 | AFC: Anthony Lynn, L.A. Chargers; NFC: Jason Garrett, Dallas | ESPN/ABC/Disney XD |
| 2019 | January 26, 2020 | AFC 38–33 | AFC, 25–22 | Offensive: Lamar Jackson, Baltimore Ravens, Quarterback; Defensive: Calais Campbell, Jacksonville Jaguars, Defensive end | Camping World Stadium | 54,024 | AFC: John Harbaugh, Baltimore; NFC: Pete Carroll, Seattle | ESPN/ABC/Disney XD |

=== AFC–NFC eSports Pro Bowl (2020) ===
| Season | Date | Score | Series | Most Valuable Player |
|---|---|---|---|---|
| 2020 | January 31, 2021 | NFC 32–12 | AFC, 25–23 | Kyler Murray, Arizona, Quarterback |

=== AFC–NFC Pro Bowl (2021) ===
| Season | Date | Score | Series | Most Valuable Player(s) | Venue | Attendance | Head coaches | Network |
|---|---|---|---|---|---|---|---|---|
| 2021 | February 6, 2022 | AFC 41–35 | AFC, 26–23 | Offensive: Justin Herbert, Los Angeles Chargers, Quarterback; Defensive: Maxx Crosby, Las Vegas Raiders, Defensive end | Allegiant Stadium | 56,206 | AFC: Mike Vrabel, Tennessee; NFC: Matt LaFleur, Green Bay | ESPN/ABC/Disney XD |

=== Pro Bowl Games (2022–2026) ===
| Season | Date | Score | Series | Most Valuable Player(s) | Venue | Attendance | Head coaches | Network |
|---|---|---|---|---|---|---|---|---|
| 2022 | February 5, 2023 | NFC 35–33 | AFC, 26–24 | N/A | Allegiant Stadium | 58,331 | AFC: Peyton Manning; NFC: Eli Manning | ESPN/ABC/Disney XD |
| 2023 | February 4, 2024 | NFC 64–59 | AFC, 26–25 | Offensive: Baker Mayfield, Tampa Bay, Quarterback; Defensive: Demario Davis, New Orleans, Linebacker | Camping World Stadium | 55,709 | AFC: Peyton Manning; NFC: Eli Manning | ESPN/ABC/Disney XD |
| 2024 | February 2, 2025 | NFC 76–63 | Tied, 26–26 | Offensive: Jared Goff, Detroit, Quarterback; Defensive: Byron Murphy Jr, Minnesota, Cornerback | Camping World Stadium | 54,313 | AFC: Peyton Manning; NFC: Eli Manning | ESPN/ABC/Disney XD |
| 2025 | February 3, 2026 | NFC 66–52 | NFC, 27–26 | Offensive: George Pickens, Dallas, Wide Receiver; Defensive: Antoine Winfield Jr., Tampa Bay, Safety | Moscone Center | TBD | AFC: Steve Young; NFC: Jerry Rice | ESPN/Disney XD |

== Stadiums that have hosted the Pro Bowl ==
- Wrigley Field (1939)
- Gilmore Stadium (January and December 1940)
- Polo Grounds (January 1942)
- Shibe Park (December 1942)
- Los Angeles Memorial Coliseum (1951–1972, 1979)
- Texas Stadium (1973)
- Arrowhead Stadium (1974)
- Miami Orange Bowl (1975)
- Louisiana Superdome (1976)
- Kingdome (1977)
- Tampa Stadium (1978)
- Aloha Stadium (1980–2009, 2011–2014, 2016)
- Sun Life Stadium (2010)
- University of Phoenix Stadium (2015)
- Camping World Stadium (2017–2020, 2024–2025)
- Allegiant Stadium (2022–2023)
- Moscone Center (2026)

== Records ==
=== Players with most invitations ===
As of the 2026 Pro Bowl, 30 players have been invited to at least 11 Pro Bowls in their careers. Except for those that are currently active or not yet eligible, each of these players have been inducted into the Pro Football Hall of Fame except Jason Witten. With his selection in the 2022 Pro Bowl, quarterback Tom Brady has the all-time invitations record at 15. Of currently active players, offensive lineman Trent Williams has the most Pro Bowl invitations with 12.

| Pro Bowls | Player | Pos | Seasons by team | Selection years | Year of induction into Hall of Fame |
|---|---|---|---|---|---|
| 15 | Tom Brady | QB | New England Patriots (2000–2019); Tampa Bay Buccaneers (2020–2022) | 2001, 2004, 2005, 2007, 2009–2018, 2021 | Eligible in 2028 |
| 14 | Tony Gonzalez | TE | Kansas City Chiefs (1997–2008); Atlanta Falcons (2009–2013) | 1999–2008, 2010–2013 | 2019 |
| 14 | Peyton Manning | QB | Indianapolis Colts (1998–2011); Denver Broncos (2012–2015) | 1999, 2000, 2002–2010, 2012–2014 | 2021 |
| 14 | Bruce Matthews | G | Houston Oilers / Tennessee Oilers / Tennessee Titans (1983–2001) | 1988–2001 | 2007 |
| 14 | Merlin Olsen | DT | Los Angeles Rams (1962–1976) | 1962–1975 | 1982 |
| 13 | Drew Brees | QB | San Diego Chargers (2001–2005); New Orleans Saints (2006–2020) | 2004, 2006, 2008–2014, 2016–2019 | 2026 |
| 13 | Ray Lewis | LB | Baltimore Ravens (1996–2012) | 1997–2001, 2003, 2004, 2006–2011 | 2018 |
| 13 | Jerry Rice | WR | San Francisco 49ers (1985–2000); Oakland Raiders (2001–2004); Seattle Seahawks (2004) | 1986–1996, 1998, 2002 | 2010 |
| 13 | Reggie White | DE | Philadelphia Eagles (1985–1992); Green Bay Packers (1993–1998); Carolina Panthers (2000) | 1986–1998 | 2006 |
| 12 | Champ Bailey | CB | Washington Redskins (1999–2003); Denver Broncos (2004–2013) | 2000–2007, 2009–2012 | 2019 |
| 12 | Ken Houston | S | Houston Oilers (1967–1972); Washington Redskins (1973–1980) | 1968–1979 | 1986 |
| 12 | Randall McDaniel | G | Minnesota Vikings (1988–1999); Tampa Bay Buccaneers (2000–2001) | 1989–2000 | 2009 |
| 12 | Jim Otto | C | Oakland Raiders (1960–1974) | 1961–1972 | 1980 |
| 12 | Junior Seau | LB | San Diego Chargers (1990–2002); Miami Dolphins (2003–2005); New England Patriots (2006–2009) | 1991–2002 | 2015 |
| 12 | Will Shields | G | Kansas City Chiefs (1993–2006) | 1995–2006 | 2015 |
| 12 | Trent Williams | OT | Washington Redskins (2010–2019); San Francisco 49ers (2020–present) | 2012–2018, 2020−2023, 2025 | Currently playing |
| 11 | Larry Allen | G | Dallas Cowboys (1994–2005); San Francisco 49ers (2006–2007) | 1995–2001, 2003–2006 | 2013 |
| 11 | Derrick Brooks | LB | Tampa Bay Buccaneers (1995–2008) | 1997–2006, 2008 | 2014 |
| 11 | Brett Favre | QB | Atlanta Falcons (1991); Green Bay Packers (1992–2007); New York Jets (2008); Minnesota Vikings (2009–2010) | 1992, 1993, 1995–1997, 2001–2003, 2007–2009 | 2016 |
| 11 | Larry Fitzgerald | WR | Arizona Cardinals (2004–2020) | 2005, 2007–2013, 2015–2017 | 2026 |
| 11 | Travis Kelce | TE | Kansas City Chiefs (2013–present) | 2015–2025 | Currently playing |
| 11 | Bob Lilly | DT | Dallas Cowboys (1961–1974) | 1962, 1964–1973 | 1980 |
| 11 | Tom Mack | G | Los Angeles Rams (1966–1978) | 1967–1975, 1977, 1978 | 1999 |
| 11 | Gino Marchetti | DE | Dallas Texans (1952); Baltimore Colts (1953–1964; 1966) | 1954–1964 | 1972 |
| 11 | Anthony Muñoz | OT | Cincinnati Bengals (1980–1992) | 1981–1991 | 1998 |
| 11 | Jonathan Ogden | OT | Baltimore Ravens (1996–2007) | 1997–2007 | 2013 |
| 11 | Willie Roaf | OT | New Orleans Saints (1993–2001); Kansas City Chiefs (2002–2005) | 1994–2000, 2002–2005 | 2012 |
| 11 | Bruce Smith | DE | Buffalo Bills (1985–1999); Washington Redskins (2000–2003) | 1987–1990, 1992–1998 | 2009 |
| 11 | Jason Witten | TE | Dallas Cowboys (2003–2017, 2019); Las Vegas Raiders (2020) | 2004–2010, 2012–2014, 2017 | Not inducted |
| 11 | Rod Woodson | CB | Pittsburgh Steelers (1987–1996); San Francisco 49ers (1997); Baltimore Ravens (1998–2001); Oakland Raiders (2002–2003) | 1989–1994, 1996, 1999–2002 | 2009 |

== Television ==
The DuMont Television Network broadcast the Pro Bowl in 1954 and 1955. The 1954 game was carried on 36 stations.

The Pro Bowl was broadcast on an alternative basis by CBS and NBC from 1971 to 1974, while the other network broadcast the Super Bowl. The game was then broadcast as part of the Monday Night Football package on ABC from 1975 to 1987. Sister network ESPN took it over as part of the ESPN Sunday Night Football package from 1988 to 1994. The game then returned to ABC for the 1995 through 2003 games. In the early 2000s, after suffering through several years of declining ratings ABC considered moving the game to Monday night, but the network instead decided to sell off the rights for the 2004–2006 games to ESPN.

For the 2007 to 2014 Pro Bowls, the network which aired the Super Bowl that season also aired the Pro Bowl. The 2007 game on CBS was held on the Saturday after Super Bowl XLI because of the 49th Grammy Awards. The 2008 game was on Fox, broadcaster of Super Bowl XLII. Likewise, the 2009 game was on NBC, broadcaster of Super Bowl XLIII. CBS sold off their rights to the 2010 game to ESPN, which was played a week before the Super Bowl at the Super Bowl site, Sun Life Stadium. CBS also declined to broadcast the 2013 game, which was instead shown on NBC. The 2014 game, also shown on NBC, was the final Pro Bowl on network television for four years.

ESPN then began holding exclusive rights to the Pro Bowl starting in 2015. In 2018, the Pro Bowl returned to network television for the first time in four years as part of a joint ABC/ESPN simulcast (both sister networks are owned by The Walt Disney Company). Disney XD was added to the simulcast for 2019. When the Pro Bowl's format was changed in 2023, only ESPN aired the Tuesday skills competitions live, then ABC re-aired them later on Saturday; the flag football game remained ESPN/ABC/Disney XD simulcasts. With the game moving to Tuesday night in 2026, it will remain on ESPN/Disney XD but no longer on ABC.

Throughout his broadcasting career, John Madden declined to be part of the announcing crew when his network carried the Pro Bowl for his aviatophobia and claustrophobia (a joke referencing both is made in the Madden NFL '97 video game before the beginning of the Pro Bowl in season mode, where Madden quips that he drove his "Madden Bus" to Hawaii, rather than flying). Until Madden's retirement from broadcasting after the 2009 Pro Bowl, it had only occurred twice: Former San Diego Chargers quarterback and MNF personality Dan Fouts, whom Madden had replaced, took his place on ABC in 2003, and Cris Collinsworth took his place on NBC in 2009 (Collinsworth ended up replacing Madden permanently upon the latter's retirement).

In conjunction with the Professional Bowlers Association, the Pro Bowl also sponsors a charity bowling tournament the occurs during the weekend leading up to the game. The tournament is open to all NFL players regardless of whether they have been selected to play in the Pro Bowl. Winners are announced at halftime, and are presented with a check in their name payable to their favorite charity.

=== Most watched Pro Bowls ===
Since 2000

| Rank | Game | Date | Matchup | | | | Network | Viewers (millions) | TV rating | Location |
|---|---|---|---|---|---|---|---|---|---|---|
| 1 | 2011 Pro Bowl | January 29, 2011 | AFC | 41 | NFC | 55 | Fox | 13.4 | 7.7 | Aloha Stadium, Honolulu, HI |
| 2 | 2000 Pro Bowl | February 6, 2000 | AFC | 31 | NFC | 51 | ABC | 13.2 | 8.6 | Aloha Stadium, Honolulu, HI |
| 3 | 2012 Pro Bowl | January 29, 2012 | NFC | 41 | AFC | 59 | NBC | 12.5 | 7.3 | Aloha Stadium, Honolulu, HI |
| 4 | 2010 Pro Bowl | January 31, 2010 | AFC | 41 | NFC | 34 | ESPN | 12.3 | 7.1 | Sun Life Stadium, Miami Gardens, FL |
| 5 | 2013 Pro Bowl | January 27, 2013 | AFC | 35 | NFC | 62 | NBC | 12.2 | 7.1 | Aloha Stadium, Honolulu, HI |
| 6 | 2014 Pro Bowl | January 26, 2014 | Team Rice | 22 | Team Sanders | 21 | NBC | 11.4 | 6.6 | Aloha Stadium, Honolulu, HI |
| 7 | 2008 Pro Bowl | February 10, 2008 | AFC | 30 | NFC | 42 | Fox | 10.0 | 6.3 | Aloha Stadium, Honolulu, HI |
| 8 | 2003 Pro Bowl | February 2, 2003 | NFC | 23 | AFC | 45 | ABC | 9.1 | 5.9 | Aloha Stadium, Honolulu, HI |
| 9 | 2009 Pro Bowl | February 8, 2009 | NFC | 30 | AFC | 21 | NBC | 8.8 | 5.4 | Aloha Stadium, Honolulu, HI |
| 10 | 2015 Pro Bowl | January 25, 2015 | Team Irvin | 32 | Team Carter | 28 | ESPN | 8.8 | 5.1 | University of Phoenix Stadium, Glendale, AZ |

=== Blackout policy ===
Prior to 2015, the Pro Bowl was still subject to the NFL's blackout policies, requiring the game to be blacked out within 75 miles (121 km) of the stadium site if the game does not sell out all of the stadium's seats. However, with the lifting of the NFL's blackout rules in 2015, the game could be shown within the host stadium regardless of attendance.

== Criticism ==
=== Quality ===
For decades, the Pro Bowl had been criticized as a glamour event more than a football game. This is due to the voluntary nature of the game, the arbitrary voting process, and the fear of player injury.

While players were financially compensated for participating in the Pro Bowl, for a star player, the pay could have been less than 1% of their salary. Many star players had excused themselves from participation over the years, meaning that the very best players were not necessarily featured. Not having the best players in the Pro Bowl was exacerbated by the introduction of fan voting (see section below).

Another criticism of the game was that the players—particularly on defense—were not competing at the same level of intensity as they would during the regular season or the playoffs. This is because player injury plays a much greater part in a team's success in the NFL as compared to the other major American sports. For this reason, unlike the NBA, NHL, and MLB (which host their all-star events as a mid-season break), the Pro Bowl was historically held after the completion of the season and playoffs. This means that a player injured in the Pro Bowl would have at least six months to rehab before the next season begins. However, starting in 2010, the Pro Bowl was moved from the week after the Super Bowl to the week before it. Because of the above-noted fear of injury, players from the two teams participating in the Super Bowl were banned from participation, thus increasing the absence of star players.

In the 2012 game, the lack of defensive effort was apparent, not only to anyone watching, but additionally evidenced by the combined score of 100 points. Brett Keisel, an NFL player watching the game said, "They probably should have just put flags on them," indicating that the quality was about on the level of flag football. Commissioner Roger Goodell stated that the game needed to improve, otherwise it would be eliminated. It is worth noting that entire teams had declined to participate after losing the conference championship, like the 2015 New England Patriots, which had seven starters on the Pro Bowl roster. This, among other factors, caused the 2016 Pro Bowl to be more of a game featuring emerging players, with a record of 133 players selected overall (including those who were absent), and ended up including rookie quarterback Jameis Winston instead of recognized veterans Tom Brady and Carson Palmer, who were both in the conversation for the 2015 NFL season MVP before losing in their respective conference finals. In 2022 and 2023, Josh Allen turned down invitations to the Pro Bowl in favor of playing in the AT&T Pebble Beach Pro-Am golf tournament, decisions that he stated were to allow himself to recover from several minor injuries. In 2023, Las Vegas Raiders running back Josh Jacobs called the event "stupid" and stated that he would prefer to go on vacation rather than play in the game. The event was set to be hosted in Las Vegas that year.

=== Selection process ===
Voting by fans made up 1/3 of the vote for Pro Bowl players. Some teams earned more selections of their players because fans would often vote for their favorite team and not necessarily the best player. In the 2008 Pro Bowl, the Dallas Cowboys had thirteen players on the NFC roster, an NFL record. "If you're in a small market, no one really gets to see you play", said Minnesota Vikings cornerback Antoine Winfield, who spent much of his early career with the small-market Buffalo Bills. "If you're a quiet guy, it's hard to get the attention. You just have to work hard and play." Winfield made the Pro Bowl in 2008 after ten seasons of being shut out.

The player voting has also been subject to significant criticism. It is not uncommon for players to pick the same players over and over again; former offensive lineman (and Sports Illustrated analyst) Ross Tucker has cited politics, incumbency, personal vendettas, and compensation for injury in previous years as primary factors in players' choices. Thus, players who have seen their play decline with age could have still been perennially elected to the Pro Bowl for their popularity among other players, something which was particularly common among positions such as the offensive line, where few statistics are available. For example, in 2010, Baltimore Ravens linebacker Terrell Suggs admitted voting for Ryan Fitzpatrick (then quarterback of the 4-12 Buffalo Bills) over eventual league most valuable player Tom Brady not because he thought Fitzpatrick was the better player but as a vote of disrespect toward Brady's team, the New England Patriots.

Some players had a surprisingly small number of Pro Bowl selections despite distinguished careers. Hall of Fame fullback John Riggins was selected only once in his career from 1971 to 1985. He was not selected in the year after which he set the record for rushing touchdowns in a season and his team made it to the Super Bowl (although he did make the All-Pro team). Hall of Fame linebacker Ray Nitschke only made the Pro Bowl once, despite being named All-Pro seven times and being the MVP of the 1962 NFL Championship Game. Defensive back Ken Riley never made the Pro Bowl in his 15 seasons, even though he recorded 65 interceptions, the fourth-highest total in NFL history at the time of his retirement. Former Jacksonville Jaguars halfback Fred Taylor, who is 15th in all-time rushing yards, was elected to his only Pro Bowl in 2007, despite averaging 4.6 yards per carry for his career, better than all but five running backs ranked in the top 30 in all-time rushing. Aaron Smith made it to the Pro Bowl once in 13 years (2004) despite winning two Super Bowl rings with the Pittsburgh Steelers and being named to the Sports Illustrated 2000s All Decade Team and defensive teammates such as Troy Polamalu, Casey Hampton, and James Harrison being named to multiple Pro Bowls during his career; Smith would often be ranked as one of the NFL's most underrated players during his career.

== Elimination ==
The elimination of the Pro Bowl games was announced by the National Football League (NFL) on August 26, 2026.

=== Background ===
The NFL first introduced The Pro Bowl Games in 2022 to replace the traditional tackle all-star game with skills competitions and flag football. After a four-year run of the revised format, the NFL announced that it would stop the competitive events while preserving the Pro Bowl selection as an annual player honor.

=== Reasoning ===
NFL executive Peter O'Riley explained the decision by saying "Ultimately, the Pro Bowl, at its core, is about honoring the best of the best in that season, on the field, in real games. And the shift here is about shifting the focus from the game — which is ultimately where people's attention goes, especially the replacement players tied to it — to the honor."

== See also ==
- American Football League All-Star games
- All-America Football Conference All-Star Game
- Chicago College All-Star Game – a series played between an NFL team and a collegiate all-star team
- NFL Pro Bowl records
