= All-America Football Conference All-Star Game =

1949 American football game in Texas

The All-America Football Conference (AAFC) All-Star Game or Shamrock Bowl was an American football game played in Houston's old Rice Field on Saturday, December 17, 1949, between the Cleveland Browns (the 1949 AAFC Champions) and an all-star selection from the AAFC's other six teams. It was the AAFC's last game before it was merged into the National Football League (NFL).

The "Shamrock Bowl" was promoted by Texas oilman Glenn McCarthy, who had been seeking a Houston franchise in either the AAFC or NFL. A disappointing crowd of 10,000 braved a rainstorm to watch the final AAFC game, in which the All-Stars defeat the Browns, 12–7.

== Background ==
The AAFC was an American football league which rivaled the established National Football League (NFL) from 1946 to 1949. One of the NFL's most formidable competitors, the AAFC attracted many of the nation's best players, produced one of pro football's greatest teams, and introduced many lasting innovations to the game. However, the AAFC was ultimately unable to sustain itself in competition with the NFL. A major factor in the league's demise was its domination by the Cleveland Browns, who compiled a four-year record of 52-4-3 and won all four AAFC titles.

Today, all-star games in pro football are a well-established tradition, as the NFL has played its Pro Bowl after every season since 1950. In the late 1940s, however, such games were the exception and not the rule. The NFL played an all-star game following the 1938 through 1942 seasons, but abandoned the series in the midst of World War II.

The AAFC did not play an all-star game during its relatively successful early years, but did play one following its troubled final season. It was played eight days after the NFL and AAFC agreed to peace terms. Red Strader coached the All-Stars.

== Box scores ==
AAFC All-Stars 12, Cleveland Browns 7

	1	2	3	4	Total
AAFC All-Stars	6	6	0	0	12
Cleveland Browns	0	7	0	0	7

Dec. 17, 1949 at Rice Field, Houston, Texas

- Scoring
  - AAFC - Mutryn 2 run (Albert kick failed)
  - CLE. - Dub Jones 40 pass from Graham (Groza kick)
  - AAFC - Baldwin 23 pass from Albert (Albert kick failed)
