= Quarterback (TV series) =

American documentary series

- Genre: Documentary
- Starring: Patrick Mahomes; Kirk Cousins; Marcus Mariota; Joe Burrow; Jared Goff; Jayden Daniels; Baker Mayfield; Cam Ward; Joe Flacco
- Country of origin: United States
- Original language: English
- No. of seasons: 3
- No. of episodes: 22

Production
- Executive producers: Peyton Manning; Ross Ketover; Pat Kelleher; Keith Cossrow; Patrick Mahomes
- Production companies: NFL Films; 2PM Productions; Omaha Productions

Original release
- Network: Netflix
- Release: July 12, 2023

Related
- Receiver

Quarterback is an American television documentary series on Netflix that follows quarterbacks during the National Football League (NFL) season. The National Football League (NFL) and Netflix partnered to develop the series, while NFL Films, 2PM Productions, and Omaha Productions produced the series.

== History ==
=== Early development and season one ===
The NFL and Netflix announced the series on February 22, 2023. The announcement of the series followed the success of various sports documentary series on Netflix, beginning with their Drive to Survive series; Netflix also launched the tennis- and golf-themed series Break Point and Full Swing earlier in 2023.

The NFL had not done business with Netflix prior to Quarterback. Producers for the series include NFL Films, Omaha Productions, and 2PM Productions. 2PM Productions is Kansas City Chiefs quarterback Patrick Mahomes' production studio, while Omaha Productions is the production studio of former NFL quarterback Peyton Manning. Manning executive produces the series along with Ross Ketover, Pat Kelleher, and Keith Cossrow of NFL Films.

Quarterbacks featured in season 1
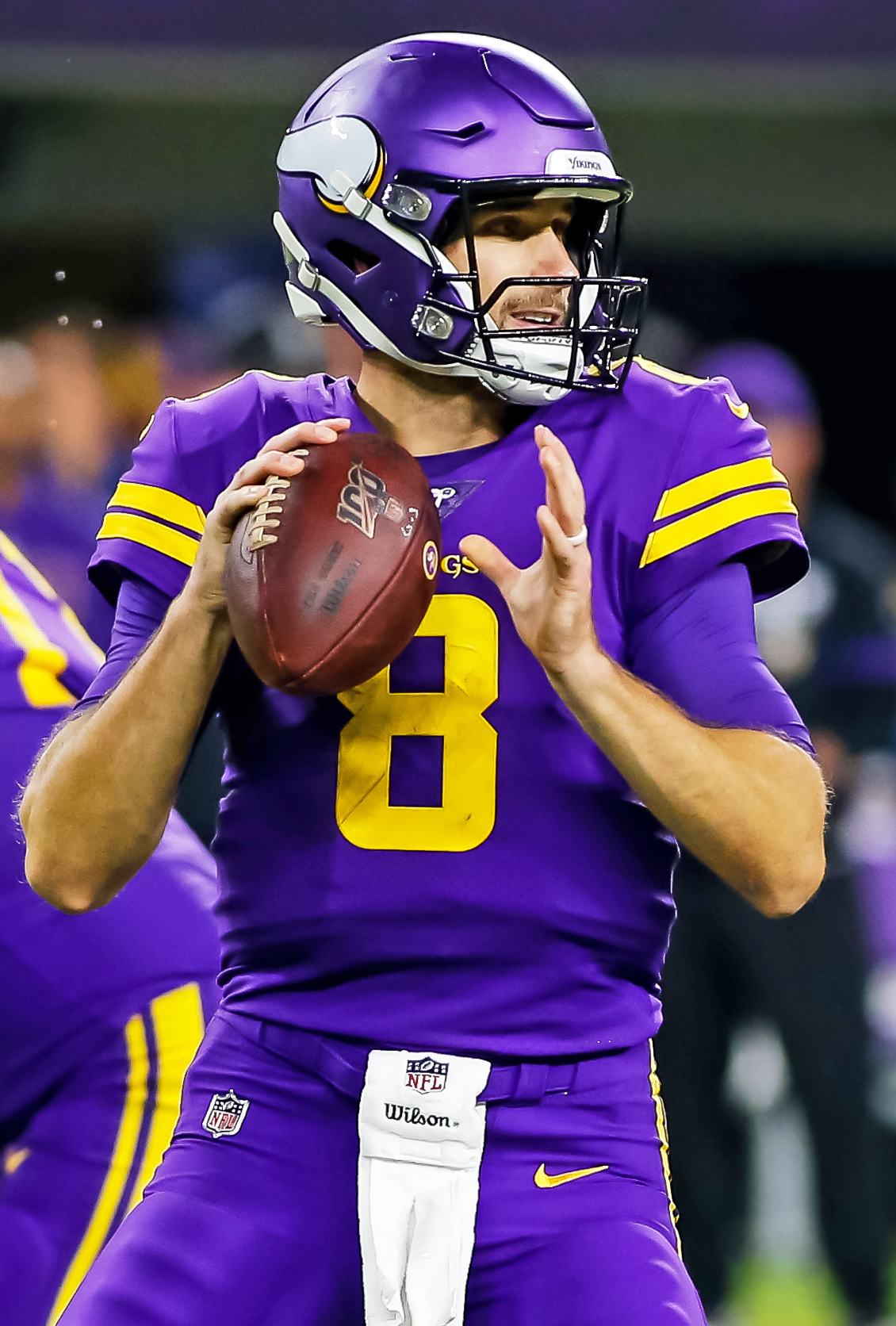
Kirk Cousins

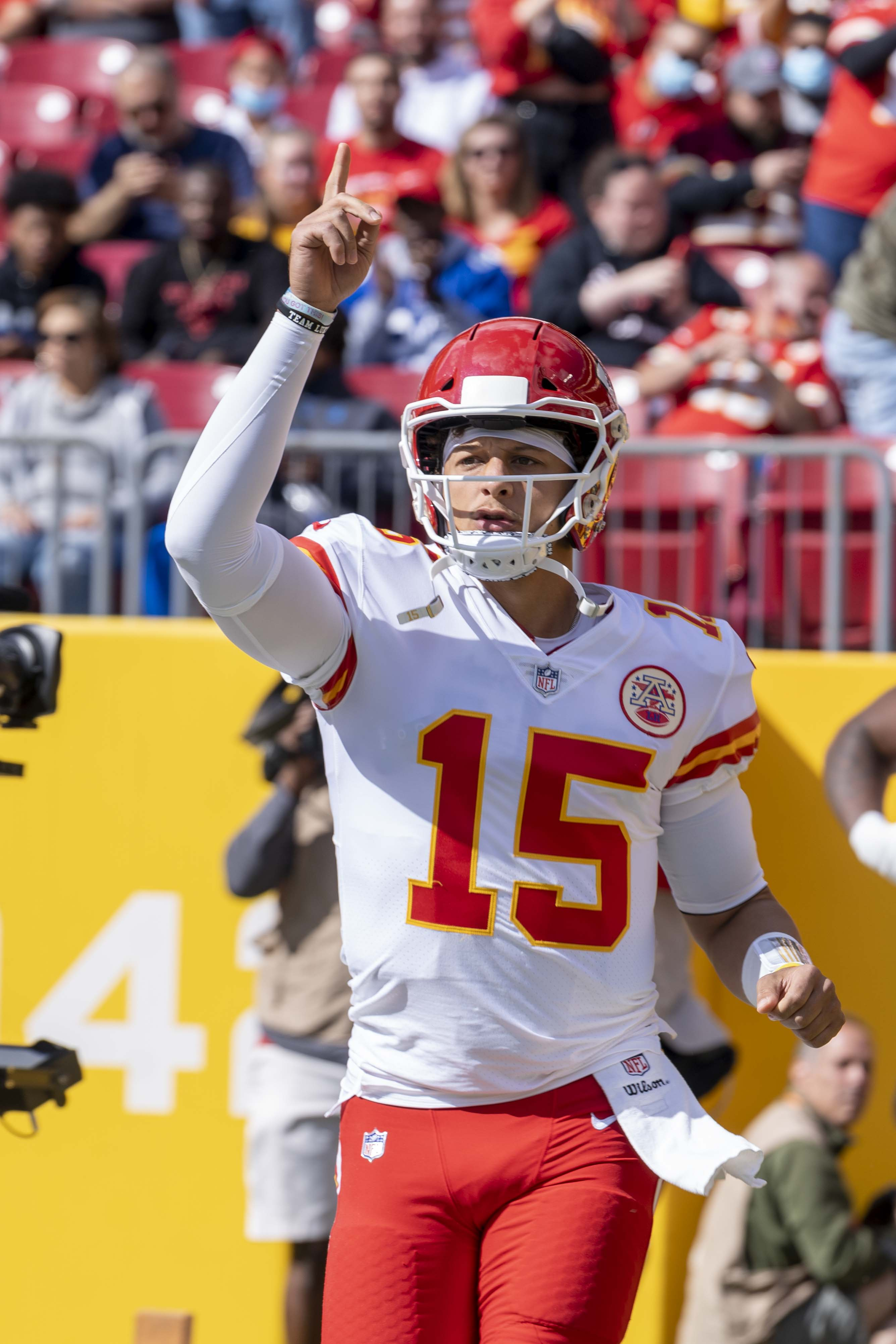
Patrick Mahomes

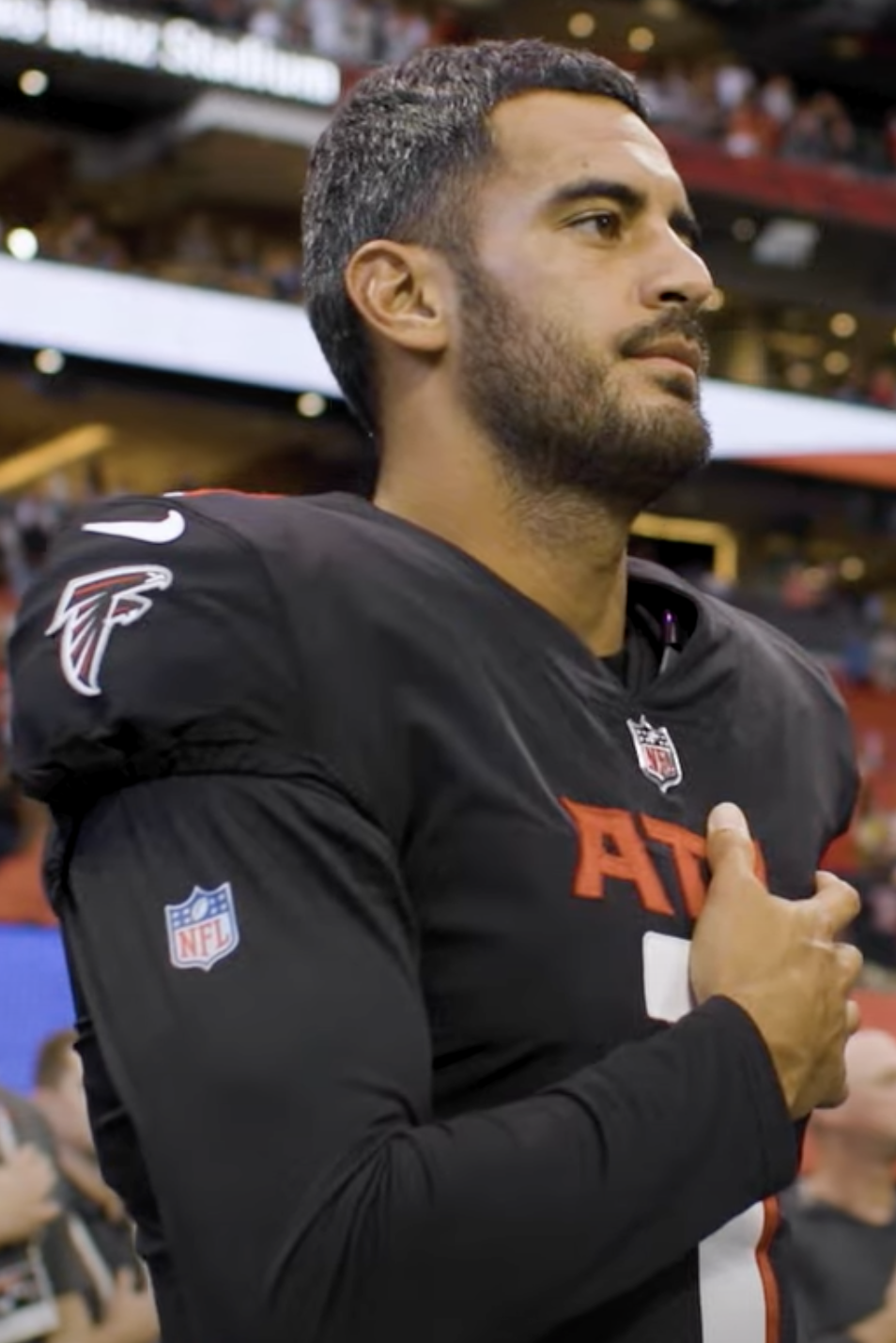
Marcus Mariota

Quarterbacks Patrick Mahomes, Kirk Cousins, and Marcus Mariota of the Kansas City Chiefs, Minnesota Vikings, and Atlanta Falcons, respectively, were the three featured in the series. The three quarterbacks wore a microphone during every game of the 2022 NFL season, marking the first time the NFL allowed such access. This audio is used in the series. Netflix was also given special access to Mahomes during the season, which culminated in him winning Super Bowl LVII and being named the game's MVP. Despite this access, Mahomes' private meetings with Chiefs head coach Andy Reid were not allowed to be filmed. The Vikings finished the season having won the NFC North, while Mariota is documented during his first (and only) season with the Falcons. The production of the season also followed the personal lives of the quarterbacks.

Netflix initially ordered one season of the series. In June, a trailer for the series was released, followed by the first season's premiere on July 12.

=== Receiver and follow-up seasons ===
In July 2023, Manning confirmed that the series had been renewed for a second season. However, in September, Julian Sancton of The Hollywood Reporter wrote that Netflix had not yet officially greenlit a second season. Manning was also reported expressing difficulties in finding subjects for a second season. As a result, Omaha Productions ultimately pivoted to following wide receivers during the 2023 NFL season, showcasing them in a new series titled Receiver.

Quarterbacks featured in season 2
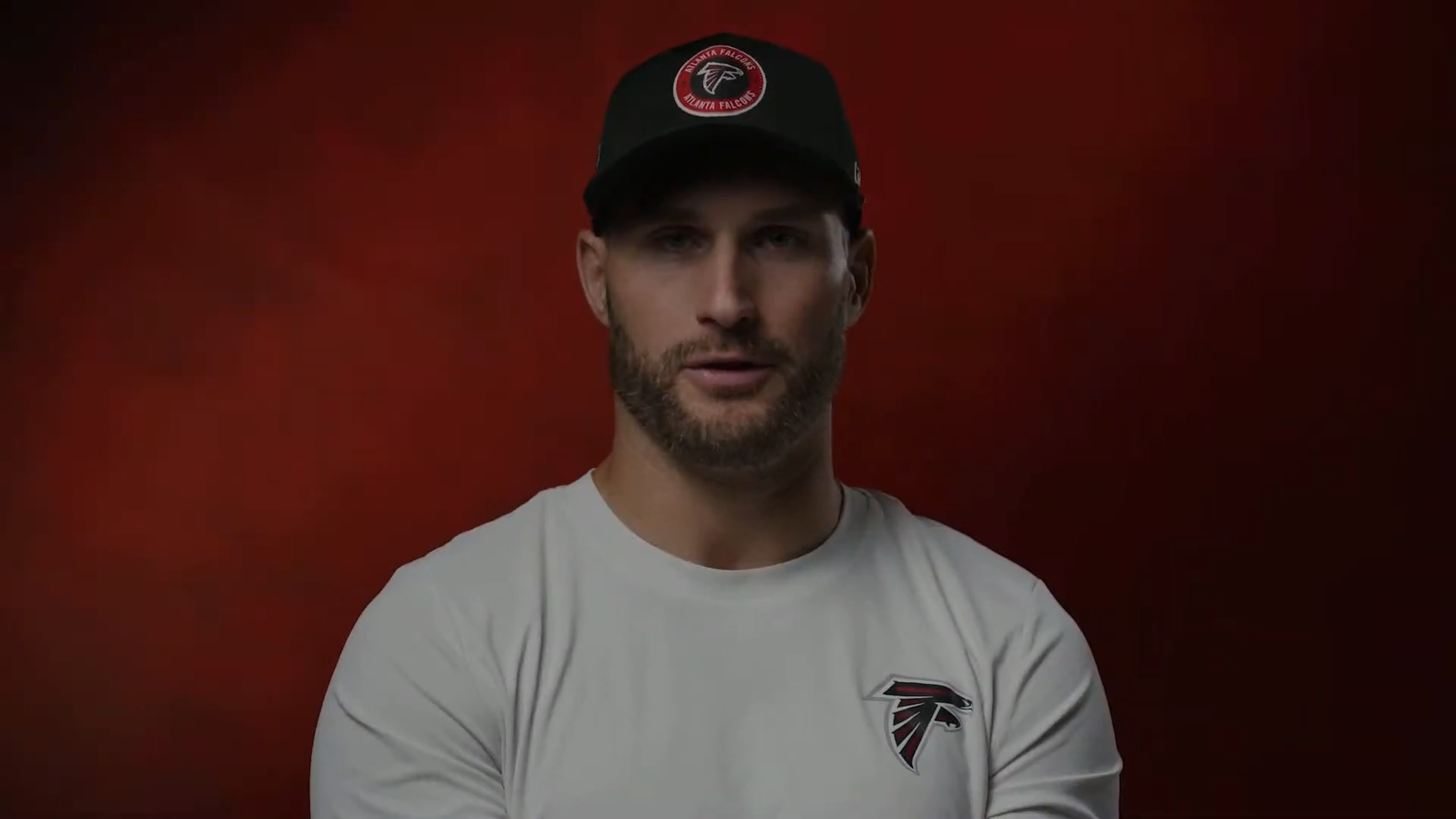
Kirk Cousins

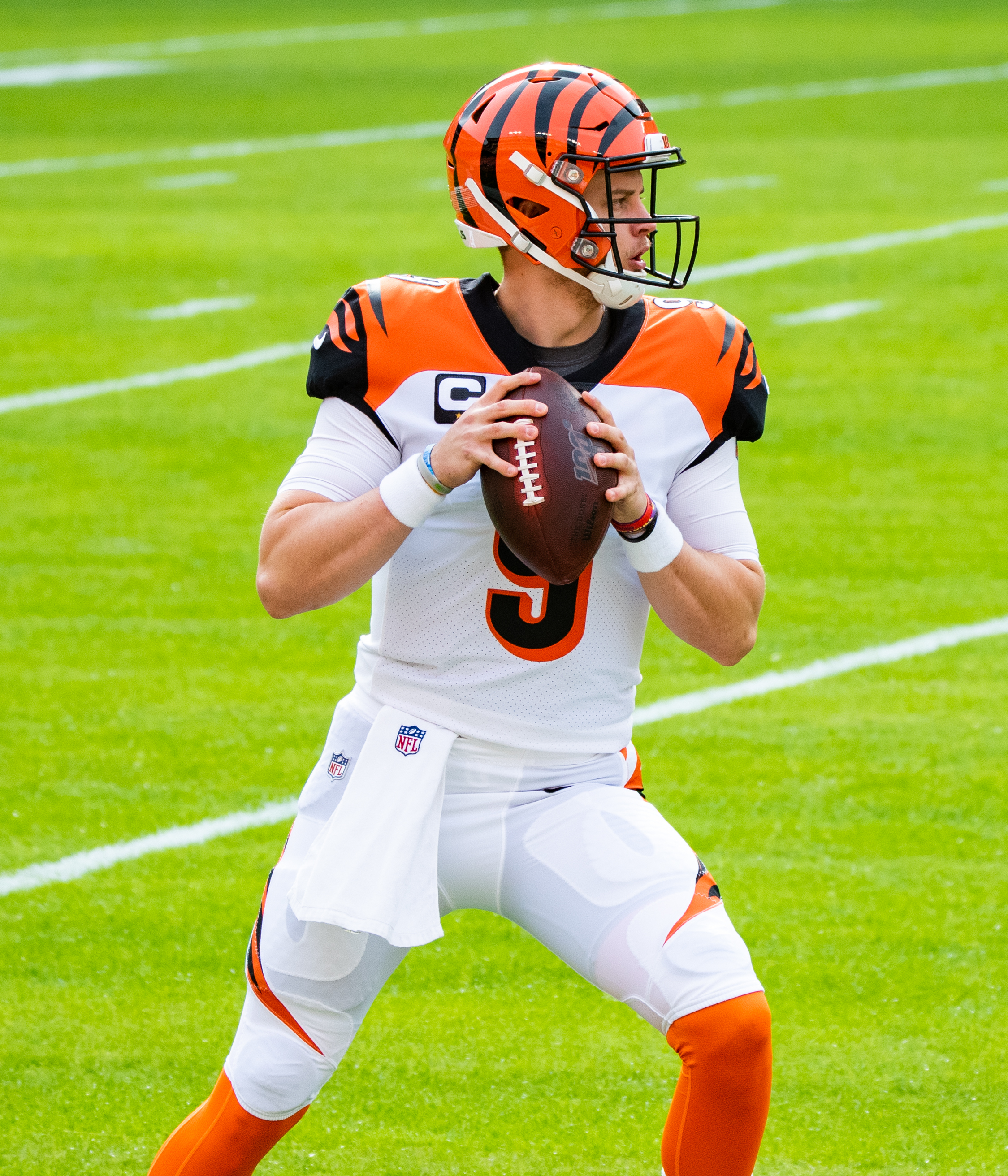
Joe Burrow

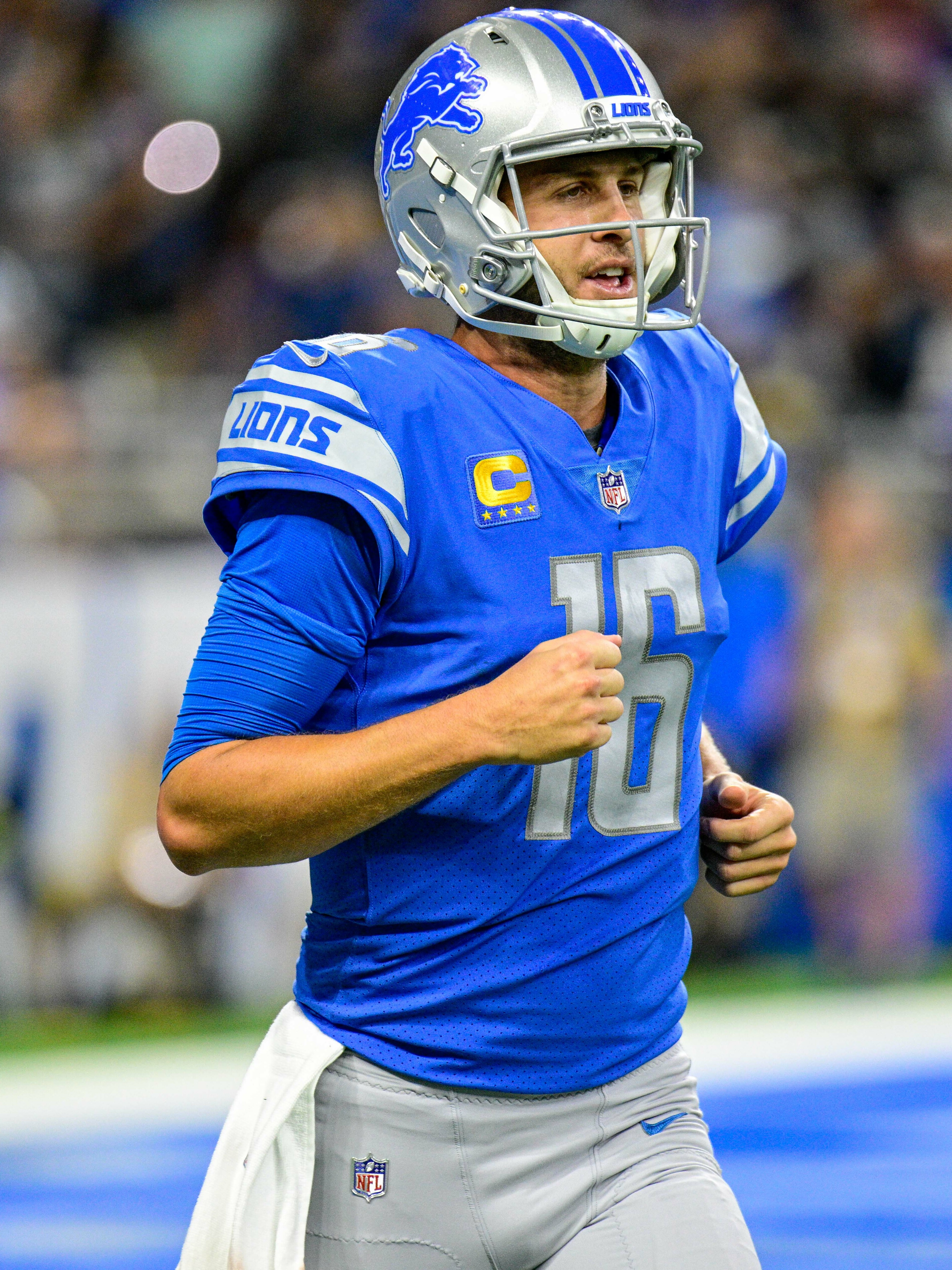
Jared Goff

On March 19, 2025, a second season was announced and scheduled for release on July 8, 2025. It was filmed during the 2024 NFL season. Cousins returned, this time as a member of the Atlanta Falcons, with Joe Burrow of the Cincinnati Bengals and Jared Goff of the Detroit Lions also being featured.

On May 13, 2026, a third season featuring Jayden Daniels, Baker Mayfield, Cam Ward, and Joe Flacco was announced to release on July 14, 2026.

Quarterbacks featured in season 3
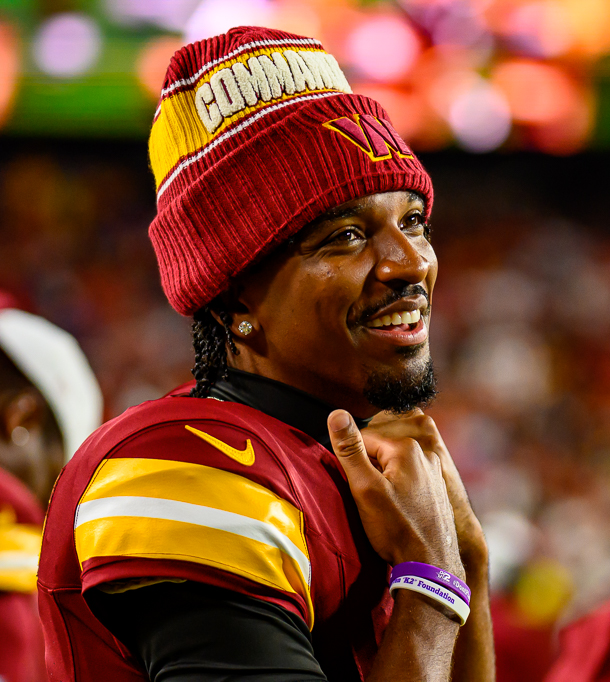
Jayden Daniels

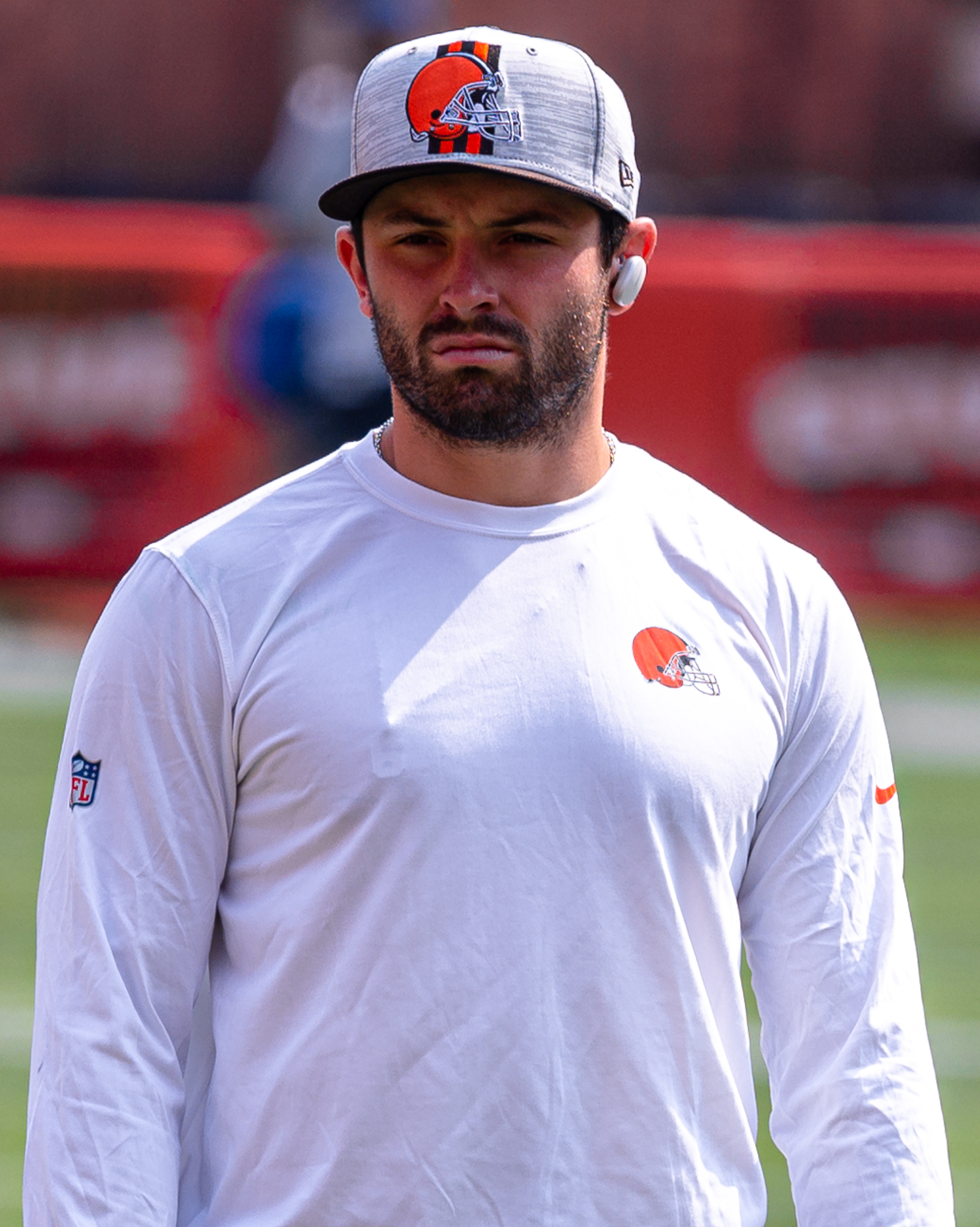
Baker Mayfield

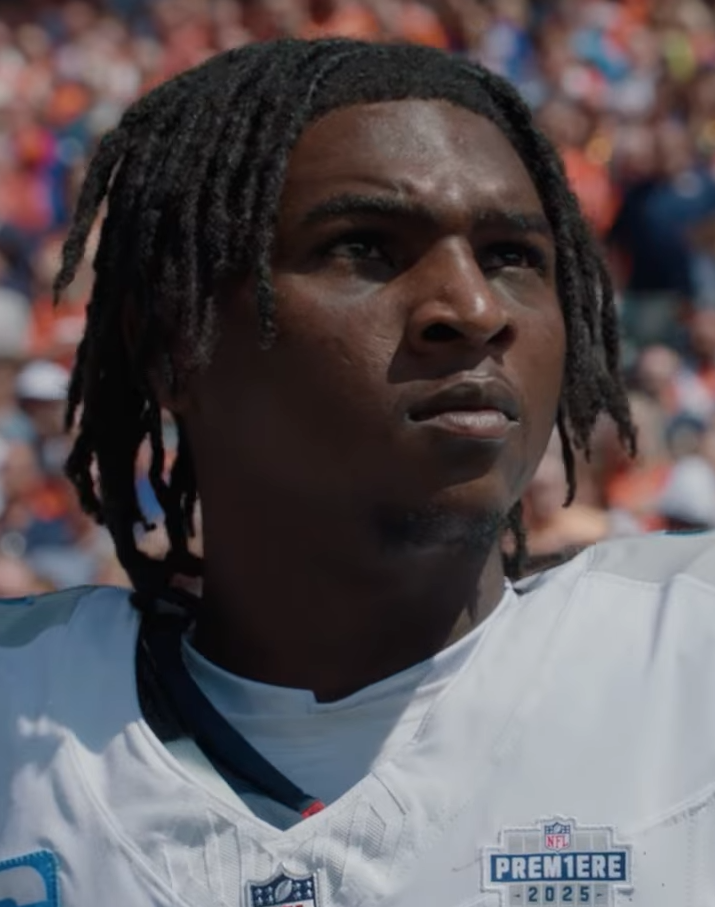
Cam Ward

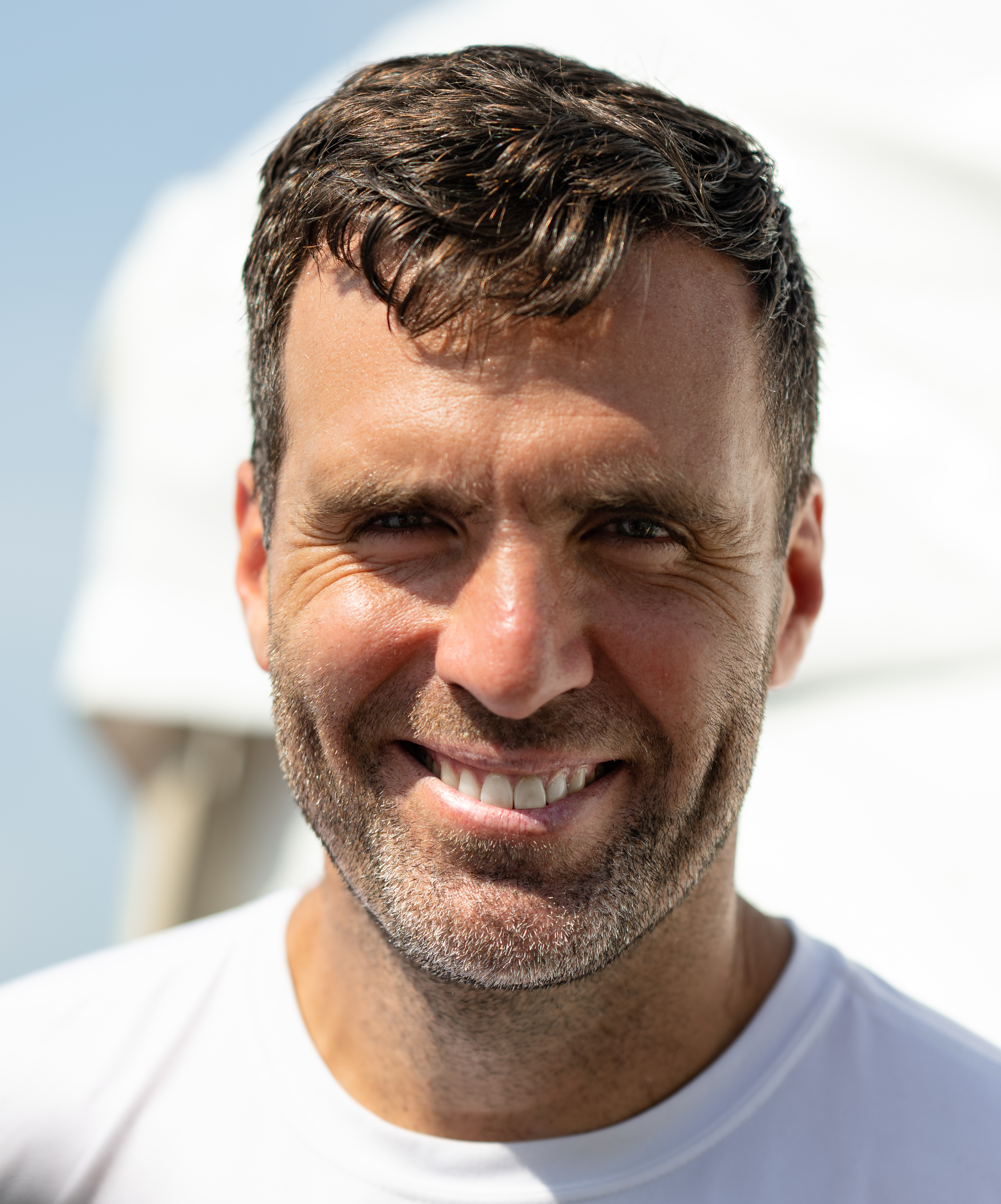
Joe Flacco

== Episodes ==
| Season | Episodes | Originally released |
|---|---|---|
| 1 | 8 | July 23, 2023 |
| 2 | 7 | July 8, 2025 |
| 3 | 7 | July 14, 2026 |

=== Season 1 (2023) ===
| No. in season | Title |
|---|---|
| 1 | "The Quest" |
| 2 | "Homecoming" |
| 3 | "Kings of Pain" |
| 4 | "Mind Games" |
| 5 | "Roller Coaster" |
| 6 | "Under Pressure" |
| 7 | "Win or Go Home" |
| 8 | "The Final Chapter" |

=== Season 2 (2025) ===
| No. in season | Title |
|---|---|
| 1 | "New Beginnings" |
| 2 | "Damn Near Perfect" |
| 3 | "Beautiful Minds" |
| 4 | "Now or Never" |
| 5 | "Stumbling Blocks" |
| 6 | "Headspace" |
| 7 | "Final Steps" |

=== Season 3 (2026) ===
| No. in season | Title |
|---|---|
| 1 | "Face of the Franchise" |
| 2 | "1 of 32" |
| 3 | "Crossroads" |
| 4 | "Too Much Static" |
| 5 | "Running Out of Time" |
| 6 | "Toughness Is a Choice" |
| 7 | "Don't Stop" |

== Reception ==
Writing for CNN, Brian Lowry commented on Mahomes' presence in the series, stating "not all play callers are created equal, with Super Bowl MVP Patrick Mahomes easily providing the best and most entertaining company, eclipsing the mere mortals who flesh out the Netflix docuseries." Lowry added that Cousins and Mariota "even with the intense and far-reaching access, seldom feel like they're opening up much more than the standard 'We're just trying to win ballgames' cliches."

Brady Langmann of Esquire offered an opposing opinion, writing that "the storytelling grows inversely complex with each player's skill level," calling the series' "standout". Langmann also wrote that "the highly curated version of Patrick Mahomes we see in Quarterback isn't all that interesting," and added "this isn't Last Chance U, where we're gifted a nuanced portrait of every player." For The Athletic, Josh Kendall wrote that "Everybody in Quarterback comes out looking pretty good. That's kind of the point. Hagiography packaged as sports documentary. It is Netflix to its core — glossy and glitzy with the right music coming in at the right places". Kendall added that the show was "clean fun", opining it is "clean in the sense that it's safe for most audiences outside of Patrick Mahomes' potty mouth. And clean in the sense that it's sanitized." Polygon's Austen Goslin gave a mixed review, calling the show "almost-great". Goslin opined that "Quarterback is in a complicated position right now. For all its issues, it's still a pretty entertaining show that has moments of big payoff for fans who only understand the 2022 season on a surface level. Mahomes breaking down a game-winning drive or seeing Cousins fight through a myriad of injuries is fascinating when they narrate it themselves. But those moments are the exception right now, rather than the norm".
