= Brian Windhorst =

American sportswriter for ESPN.com (born 1978)

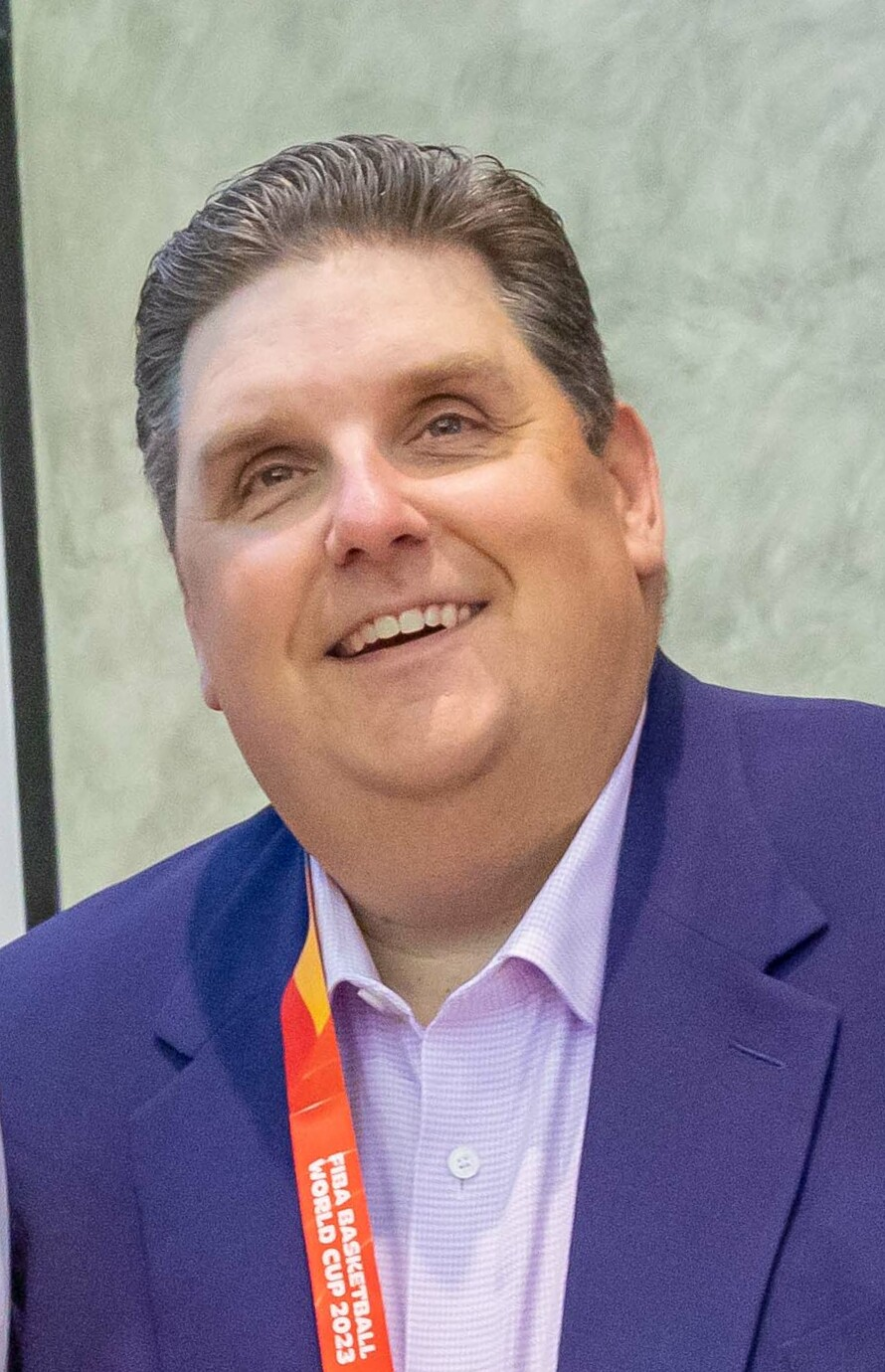
- Windhorst in 2023
- Born: January 29, 1978 (age 48)
- Education: Kent State University (BA)
- Occupation: Sportswriter
- Years active: 2000–present
- Spouse: Maureen Fulton (m. 2012)

Brian Windhorst (born January 29, 1978), nicknamed Windy, is an American sportswriter for ESPN.com who covers the National Basketball Association (NBA). He was the Cleveland Cavaliers beat writer for the Akron Beacon Journal from 2003 through the summer of 2008, and began to work for Cleveland newspaper The Plain Dealer in October 2008. He moved to ESPN in 2010 after LeBron James left the Cleveland Cavaliers for the Miami Heat.

== Early life and education ==
Windhorst attended high school in Akron, Ohio at St. Vincent–St. Mary High School and graduated from Kent State University with a Bachelor of Arts in journalism in 2000.

== Career ==
Windhorst began covering LeBron James during his high school playing career, and began covering the Cavaliers in 2003, the year that James was drafted. While James was the youngest player in the NBA, Windhorst was the youngest traveling NBA beat writer. In 2007, he co-wrote The Franchise: LeBron James and the Remaking of the Cleveland Cavaliers with sports columnist Terry Pluto. His writing at The Plain Dealer was honored by the United States Basketball Writers Association for Best Game Story in 2009, and by the Associated Press.

In 2010, Windhorst left The Plain Dealer for ESPN to cover James' new team, the Miami Heat. Prior to leaving The Plain Dealer, he contributed columns to ESPN.com and made appearances on ESPN First Take. In an interview, Windhorst stated that "obviously LeBron's a huge factor" in his decision to join ESPN, but that the Cavaliers "need to move on" without James.

On October 10, 2014, it was announced that Windhorst would join ESPN Cleveland on WKNR AM 850 in Cleveland to be their Cavaliers beat reporter and analyst, as well as host his own weekly program on sister station WWGK AM 1540. The move followed James' re-signing with the Cavaliers in 2014.

In June 2025, Windhorst co-hosted ESPN coverage of the 2025 NBA Draft alongside Kenny Beecham.

In addition to writing for ESPN, Windhorst hosts the Hoop Collective podcast.

== Personal life ==
Windhorst lives in Omaha, Nebraska, with his wife Maureen Fulton, whom he married in 2012.

== Publications ==
- Pluto, Terry and Windhorst, Brian (2007). The Franchise: LeBron James and the Remaking of the Cleveland Cavaliers. Cleveland, OH: Gray & Company, Publishers. ISBN 978-1-59851-028-7
- Pluto, Terry and Windhorst, Brian (2009). LeBron James: The Making of an MVP. Cleveland, OH: Gray & Company, Publishers. ISBN 978-1-59851-059-1
- McMenamin, David and Windhorst, Brian (2017). Return of the King: LeBron James, the Cleveland Cavaliers, and the Greatest Comeback in NBA History. New York City, NY: Grand Central Publishing. ISBN 978-1478971689
- Windhorst, Brian (2019). LeBron, Inc.: The Making of a Billion-Dollar Athlete. New York City, NY: Grand Central Publishing ISBN 978-1538730874
