= Kenny Beecham =

YouTuber & sports analyst (born 1996)

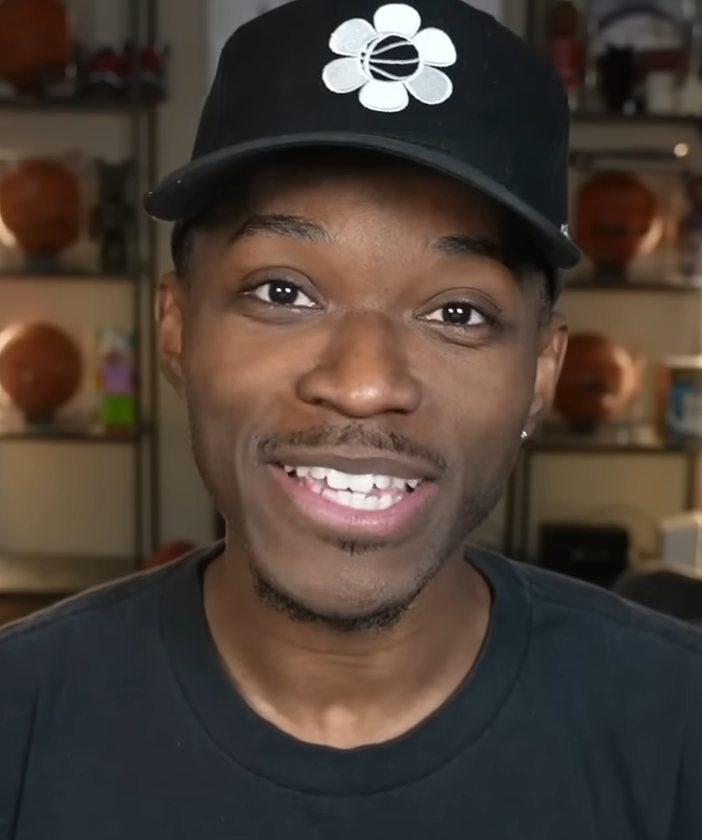
- Beecham in 2025
- Born: October 4, 1996 (age 30); Darien, Illinois, U.S.
- Other names: KOT4Q; K.B.; Beecham
- Occupations: YouTuber; sports analyst; rapper; entrepreneur
- Years active: 2012–present

YouTube information
- Channel: KOT4Q
- Genres: Gaming; sports
- Subscribers: >2 million
- Last updated: October 22, 2026

Kentrell "Kenny" Beecham (born October 4, 1996), also known as KOT4Q (acronym for King of the Fourth Quarter), is an American YouTuber, sports analyst, podcaster, rapper and entrepreneur. He hosts multiple shows and podcasts across SiriusXM, NBC Sports and ESPN, and makes occasional appearances on The Pat McAfee Show and First Take. In June 2025, Beecham covered the 2025 NBA Draft alongside Brian Windhorst for ESPN. In 2026, he was featured by Forbes 30 under 30.

== YouTube career ==
Born and raised in the suburbs about an hour outside of Chicago, Illinois, Beecham began his career streaming NBA 2K on Twitch and posting recordings on YouTube in 2011. His reach covers five channels, whose coverage has expanded to include sports analysis and player interviews. Beecham also appears as a regular co-host on the Numbers On The Board podcast and its eponymous YouTube channel, which he co-hosts with Pierre Andresen, Mike Heard, and Darrick Miller. Along with his aforementioned co-hosts, Beecham also hosted the Through The Wire podcast on the Youtube channel House of Highlights.

== Enjoy Basketball ==
In March 2022, Beecham co-founded Enjoy Basketball, a media brand encompassing a newsletter, several podcasts, and a clothing brand. In October 2025, NBC announced a partnership with Enjoy Basketball, platforming three of its shows on the Peacock streaming service and adding a weekday programming block called "The Enjoy Basketball Hour", with Beecham himself joining the NBA on NBC broadcast team as a studio analyst.

== Personal life ==
Beecham is married. In April 2022, he and his wife had their first daughter and later, they had their second daughter.
