= Manningcast =

American football alternative broadcast

- Also known as: Monday Night Football with Peyton and Eli
- Genre: NFL game telecasts
- Created by: Peyton Manning
- Presented by: Peyton Manning; Eli Manning
- Country of origin: United States
- Original language: English
- No. of seasons: 6
- No. of episodes: 54

Production
- Production location: Virtual
- Camera setup: Multi-camera
- Running time: 3–4 hours
- Production companies: National Football League; ESPN; Omaha Productions

Original release
- Network: ESPN2; ESPN+ (select games)
- Release: September 13, 2021 – present

Related
- Monday Night Countdown; Monday Night Football

Monday Night Football with Peyton and Eli, colloquially known as the Manningcast, is an American alternate live television broadcast of Monday Night Football hosted by brothers Peyton and Eli Manning, both former quarterbacks from the National Football League. It is produced by Peyton's production company Omaha Productions. The broadcasts air on ESPN2 and ESPN+ (select games) in the United States and TSN+ in Canada.

== History ==
On July 19, 2021, ESPN announced that Peyton and Eli Manning would host an alternate presentation of Monday Night Football. The deal signed by ESPN and Omaha Productions (which produced the ESPN+ series Peyton's Places) was for three seasons and called for ten games each year. For the 2021 season, it was announced that the presentation would air for the first three weeks of the season (Ravens-Raiders, Lions-Packers and Eagles-Cowboys), with the final seven telecasts announced at a later date.

The first Manningcast aired on September 13, 2021, as an alternate presentation of the Monday Night Football game between the Las Vegas Raiders and Baltimore Ravens.

On November 13, 2021, ESPN announced that the presentation would also be offered for the network's Monday-night Wild Card Game during the 2021 playoffs. In February 2022, ESPN extended its contract through the 2024 NFL season, with Omaha Productions also slated to collaborate with ESPN on extending the format to other sports properties, such as college football, golf, and UFC events. The series received a Sports Emmy Award for Outstanding Live Sports Series at the 43rd Sports Emmy Awards on May 24, 2022.

On April 10, 2024, ESPN further extended its contract with Omaha Productions until 2034. The 2024 season also saw former New England Patriots head coach Bill Belichick appear on the broadcast during the first half of games.

Belichick left the Manningcast following the 2024 season after he was hired by the University of North Carolina to be the new head coach of the football team. While North Carolina's athletic director Bubba Cunningham stated that he would continue to make regular appearances, Peyton Manning confirmed that Belichick would no longer contribute to the alternate broadcasts.

== Episodes ==
=== Series overview ===
Season	Episodes	Originally released	
Season	Episodes	First released	Last released
1	10	September 13, 2021	January 17, 2022
2	10	September 12, 2022	January 16, 2023
3	11	September 11, 2023	January 15, 2024
4	11	September 9, 2024	January 13, 2025
5	12	September 8, 2025	January 12, 2026
6	12	September 14, 2026	February 14, 2027

=== Season 1 (2021–22) ===
No. overall	No. in season	Matchup	Original release date	Guest(s)	Viewers (millions)
1	1	"Baltimore Ravens at Las Vegas Raiders"	September 13, 2021	Charles Barkley, Ray Lewis, Travis Kelce, and Russell Wilson	0.80
2	2	"Detroit Lions at Green Bay Packers"	September 20, 2021	Brett Favre, Rob Gronkowski, Patrick Willis, and Pat McAfee	1.86
3	3	"Philadelphia Eagles at Dallas Cowboys"	September 27, 2021	Matthew Stafford, LeBron James, Nick Saban, and Chris Long	1.89
4	4	"New Orleans Saints at Seattle Seahawks"	October 25, 2021	Marshawn Lynch, Tom Brady, Sue Bird, and Drew Brees	1.61
5	5	"New York Giants at Kansas City Chiefs"	November 1, 2021	Jon Stewart, Michael Strahan, Josh Allen, and Michael Irvin	1.96
6	6	"Los Angeles Rams at San Francisco 49ers"	November 15, 2021	Al Michaels, Phil Mickelson, Draymond Green, and Philip Rivers	1.55
7	7	"New York Giants at Tampa Bay Buccaneers"	November 22, 2021	Bill Parcells, Kevin Hart, Condoleezza Rice, and Julian Edelman	1.58
8	8	"New England Patriots at Buffalo Bills"	December 6, 2021	David Letterman, Aqib Talib, and Joe Buck	1.63
9	9	"Cleveland Browns at Pittsburgh Steelers"	January 3, 2022	Bill Cowher, Roger Goodell, Snoop Dogg, and Aaron Rodgers	1.48
10	10	"Wild Card: Arizona Cardinals at Los Angeles Rams"	January 17, 2022	Larry Fitzgerald, Dwayne Johnson, and Russell Wilson	1.42

=== Season 2 (2022–23) ===
No. overall	No. in season	Matchup	Original release date	Guest(s)	Viewers (millions)
11	1	"Denver Broncos at Seattle Seahawks"	September 12, 2022	Saquon Barkley, Joel McHale, and Shannon Sharpe	1.50
12	2	"Dallas Cowboys at New York Giants"	September 26, 2022	Jimmy Johnson, Pat McAfee, and Tracy Morgan	1.43
13	3	"Los Angeles Rams at San Francisco 49ers"	October 3, 2022	Jalen Hurts, Stephen Curry, and Jon Hamm	1.63
14	4	"Chicago Bears at New England Patriots"	October 24, 2022	Barack Obama, Bill Burr, and Vince Vaughn	1.48
15	5	"Cincinnati Bengals at Cleveland Browns"	October 31, 2022	Boomer Esiason, Travis Kelce, Jason Kelce, and Brad Paisley	1.29
16	6	"Baltimore Ravens at New Orleans Saints"	November 7, 2022	Luke Bryan, Kirk Cousins, and Sean Payton	1.18
17	7	"New Orleans Saints at Tampa Bay Buccaneers"	December 5, 2022	Robin Roberts, Randy Moss, and Dana White	1.14
18	8	"New England Patriots at Arizona Cardinals"	December 12, 2022	Joe Burrow, Bill Simmons, Keegan-Michael Key, and Adam Vinatieri	1.13
19	9	"Los Angeles Rams at Green Bay Packers"	December 19, 2022	George Kittle, DeMarcus Ware, Ray Lewis, and Lil Wayne	1.29
20	10	"Wild Card: Dallas Cowboys at Tampa Bay Buccaneers"	January 16, 2023	Deion Sanders, Dan Campbell, and Tedy Bruschi	1.68

=== Season 3 (2023–24) ===
No. overall	No. in season	Matchup	Original release date	Guest(s)	Viewers (millions)
21	1	"Buffalo Bills at New York Jets"	September 11, 2023	John McEnroe and Ryan Fitzpatrick	1.52
22	2	"Seattle Seahawks at New York Giants"	October 2, 2023	Will Ferrell and Shaun O'Hara	1.30
23	3	"Green Bay Packers at Las Vegas Raiders"	October 9, 2023	Desmond Howard and Jimmy Kimmel	1.04
24	4	"San Francisco 49ers at Minnesota Vikings"	October 23, 2023	Aaron Rodgers, Klay Thompson, and Tiffany Haddish	1.07
25	5	"Los Angeles Chargers at New York Jets"	November 6, 2023	Arnold Schwarzenegger, Trevor Lawrence, and Keyshawn Johnson	1.03
26	6	"Denver Broncos at Buffalo Bills"	November 13, 2023	Patrick Mahomes, Lindsey Vonn, and Kyle Brandt	1.12
27	7	"Philadelphia Eagles at Kansas City Chiefs"	November 20, 2023	Mark Wahlberg, Caitlin Clark, and Michael Vick	1.92
28	8	"Cincinnati Bengals at Jacksonville Jaguars"	December 4, 2023	Tua Tagovailoa, Kay Adams, and Chad Ochocinco	.964
29	9	"Tennessee Titans at Miami Dolphins and Green Bay Packers at New York Giants"	December 11, 2023	Nate Bargatze, Will Compton, Taylor Lewan, and Kirk Cousins	.940
30	10	"Philadelphia Eagles at Seattle Seahawks"	December 18, 2023	Christian McCaffrey, Case Keenum, and Mina Kimes	1.15
31	11	"Wild Card: Philadelphia Eagles at Tampa Bay Buccaneers"	January 15, 2024	Bruce Arians and Ray Lewis	1.03

=== Season 4 (2024–25) ===
- All episodes in this season began with Bill Belichick as a guest for the first half of each game.

No. overall	No. in season	Matchup	Original release date	Guest(s)	Viewers (millions)
32	1	"New York Jets at San Francisco 49ers"	September 9, 2024	Bill Belichick, Adam Sandler, and Chris Jones	.872
33	2	"Atlanta Falcons at Philadelphia Eagles"	September 16, 2024	Bill Belichick, Miles Teller, and Matt Ryan	1.34
34	3	"New Orleans Saints at Kansas City Chiefs"	October 7, 2024	Bill Belichick, Paul Rudd, and Archie Manning	N/A
35	4	"Buffalo Bills at New York Jets"	October 14, 2024	Bill Belichick, Will Arnett, Jason Bateman, and Rex Ryan	N/A
36	5	"Baltimore Ravens at Tampa Bay Buccaneers and Los Angeles Chargers at Arizona Cardinals"	October 21, 2024	Bill Belichick, Joe Flacco, Ed Reed, and Scott Hanson	N/A
37	6	"New York Giants at Pittsburgh Steelers"	October 28, 2024	Bill Belichick, Lawrence Taylor, LL Cool J, and Bill Cowher	N/A
38	7	"Tampa Bay Buccaneers at Kansas City Chiefs"	November 4, 2024	Bill Belichick, Jason Sudeikis, and Maria Taylor	N/A
39	8	"Houston Texans at Dallas Cowboys"	November 18, 2024	Bill Belichick, Jim Gaffigan, and J. J. Watt	N/A
40	9	"Baltimore Ravens at Los Angeles Chargers"	November 25, 2024	Bill Belichick, Owen Wilson, Luke Wilson, and Mike Vrabel	N/A
41	10	"Cincinnati Bengals at Dallas Cowboys"	December 9, 2024	Bill Belichick, John Legend, and Cris Collinsworth	N/A
42	11	"Wild Card: Minnesota Vikings at Los Angeles Rams"	January 13, 2025	Bill Belichick and Jared Allen	N/A

=== Season 5 (2025–26) ===
No. overall	No. in season	Matchup	Original release date	Guest(s)	Viewers (millions)
43	1	"Minnesota Vikings at Chicago Bears"	September 8, 2025	Bill Murray, Saquon Barkley, and Randy Moss	N/A
44	2	"Detroit Lions at Baltimore Ravens"	September 22, 2025	Jeff Daniels, Daniel Jones, and Michael Phelps	N/A
45	3	"Kansas City Chiefs at Jacksonville Jaguars"	October 6, 2025	Glen Powell, Heidi Gardner, and Fred Warner	N/A
46	4	"Washington Commanders at Kansas City Chiefs"	October 27, 2025	Jared Goff, Billy Bob Thornton, and Davante Adams	N/A
47	5	"Arizona Cardinals at Dallas Cowboys"	November 3, 2025	Baker Mayfield and Charles Barkley	N/A
48	6	"Philadelphia Eagles at Green Bay Packers"	November 10, 2025	Bob Iger, Quinta Brunson, and Shane Gillis	N/A
49	7	"Dallas Cowboys at Las Vegas Raiders"	November 17, 2025	George W. Bush, Guy Fieri, and Derek Carr	N/A
50	8	"Carolina Panthers at San Francisco 49ers"	November 24, 2025	Jerry Rice, Luke Combs, Colin Jost, Michael Che, and Jake Delhomme	.910
51	9	"New York Giants at New England Patriots"	December 1, 2025	Danny DeVito, Midge Purce, and Odell Beckham Jr.	.915
52	10	"Miami Dolphins at Pittsburgh Steelers"	December 15, 2025	Lainey Wilson, Michael Keaton, and Jason Taylor	N/A
53	11	"Seattle Seahawks at San Francisco 49ers"	January 3, 2026	Jameis Winston and Marshawn Lynch	N/A
54	12	"Wild Card: Houston Texans at Pittsburgh Steelers"	January 12, 2026	J. J. Watt and Ben Roethlisberger	N/A

=== Season 6 (2026–27) ===
No. overall	No. in season	Matchup	Original release date	Guest(s)	Viewers (millions)
55	1	"Denver Broncos at Kansas City Chiefs"	September 14, 2026	John Elway, Kate Hudson, and Mike Macdonald	N/A
56	2	"New York Giants at Los Angeles Rams"	September 21, 2026	Bryan Cranston, Aaron Paul, Jeremy Shockey, and Andrew Whitworth	N/A
57	3	"Atlanta Falcons at New Orleans Saints"	October 5, 2026	Sean Payton, Steve Gleason, and Cooper Manning	N/A
58	4	"Buffalo Bills at Los Angeles Rams"	October 12, 2026	Bryce Young, Brenda Song, and Jim Nantz	N/A
59	5	"Dallas Cowboys at Philadelphia Eagles"	October 26, 2026	Jalen Brunson and Wade Phillips	TBD
60	6	"Chicago Bears at Seattle Seahawks"	November 2, 2026	Brian Urlacher, Ken Jennings, and Richard Sherman	TBD
61	7	"Los Angeles Chargers at Baltimore Ravens"	November 16, 2026	Bo Nix, Steve Smith Sr., and Stavros Halkias	TBD
62	8	"Cincinnati Bengals at Washington Commanders"	November 23, 2026	TBA	TBD
63	9	"Dallas Cowboys at Seattle Seahawks"	December 7, 2026	TBA	TBD
64	10	"New England Patriots at Kansas City Chiefs"	December 21, 2026	TBA	TBD
65	11	"Houston Texans at Green Bay Packers"	January 4, 2027	TBA	TBD
66	12	"Super Bowl LXI"	February 14, 2027	TBA	TBD

== Curse ==
During the 2021 season, a "curse" akin to the Madden curse began to develop upon athletes who appeared on the broadcasts, with an observed pattern of their teams losing the next week despite being favored to win. For example, Travis Kelce and Russell Wilson were guests for that season's opening broadcast before their respective teams lost in Week 2; Wilson and Rob Gronkowski also suffered injuries the week following their appearances. By Week 8, all six guests had lost their next game. The Mannings joked about the trend during the November 15 broadcast by pleading for Draymond Green to succeed while Phil Mickelson quipped he would take a break from golfing to avoid the curse; Green and the Golden State Warriors won their ensuing game.

The curse appeared to end in 2022 as all players who appeared on the Manningcast that season won their next game. However, the trend returned in 2023 with every NFL player losing afterward, as did Warriors star Klay Thompson. Another basketball player, Caitlin Clark, was not affected; her Iowa team was in the beginning of a 15-game winning streak at the time, with 14 of those wins coming after her appearance.

== Adoption by other ESPN properties ==
Building upon the success of the Mannings' broadcasts, ESPN has since produced similar broadcasts for some of its other sports properties, some of which not involving the Mannings, but were still called Manningcasts:

- During the 2022 NCAA Women's Final Four, ESPN2 aired an alternate broadcast known as The Bird & Taurasi Show, featuring basketball players Sue Bird and Diana Taurasi. ESPN has since employed the format for subsequent NCAA women's tournaments, and for an NBA Christmas game in 2023.
- The "KayRod Cast" aired for select Sunday Night Baseball games during the 2022 and 2023 seasons, with Michael Kay and Alex Rodriguez. These alternate broadcasts ended when Rodriguez signed an exclusive contract with Fox Sports.
- Joe Buck and Michael Collins hosted a similar broadcast during each round of the 2022 PGA Championship, serving as the opening hour of coverage on ESPN before moving to ESPN2 (first and second rounds) or ESPN+ (third and final rounds) afterward. Joe Buck's long-time NFL commentary partner Troy Aikman, Charles Barkley, and the Mannings made guest appearances. The broadcasts marked Buck and Aikman's on-air debuts at ESPN, after moving from Fox Sports to serve as the new lead commentators for Monday Night Football (from 2015 to mid-2020, Buck served as the lead commentator for Fox's broadcasts of USGA tournaments). It was the first iteration of the format outside of Monday Night Football that was produced by Omaha. Matt Barrie replaced Buck for the 2023 PGA Championship edition. A similar alternate broadcast was produced by Omaha for the 2024 PGA Championship hosted by the hosts of the No Laying Up podcast.
- In August 2022, it was announced that the Mannings would produce alternate broadcasts for six college football games on ESPN2, with Pat McAfee as host.
- ESPN's NBA broadcasts began producing an alternate presentation of select NBA games called "NBA in Stephen A's World" starting with the 2022–23 season, with Stephen A. Smith as host. Similarly, comedian Kevin Hart and comedy group, the Plastic Cup Boyz, hosted an alternate broadcast produced by Omaha called "NBA Unplugged".
- In June 2023, ESPN announced Omaha Productions will produce an alternate presentation of the three remaining 2023 FIA Formula One World Championship races airing in North America—Montreal, Austin, and Las Vegas—with Daniel Ricciardo and Will Arnett presenting. However, due to Ricciardo replacing Scuderia Alphatauri driver Nyck de Vries following the British Grand Prix, those broadcasts never came to fruition.

== Reception ==
The format, as well as the brothers' chemistry, have received critical acclaim.

The Peyton & Eli broadcasts were parodied in the cold opening of Saturday Night Live's 48th season premiere on October 1, 2022, which portrayed the Mannings (played by host Miles Teller and Andrew Dismukes, respectively) commentating over a sketch themed around the FBI search of Donald Trump's Mar-a-Lago home. The duo made self-deprecating remarks acknowledging major changes to the SNL cast which took effect that season.

=== Accolades ===
Award	Year	Category	Recipient(s)	Result	Ref.
Sports Emmy Awards	2022	Outstanding Live Sports Series	Monday Night Football with Peyton & Eli	Won	
Sports Emmy Awards	2022	Outstanding Sports Personality/Sports Event Analyst	Peyton Manning	Nominated	
Sports Emmy Awards	2022	Outstanding Sports Personality/Emerging On-Air Talent	Eli Manning	Nominated	
Sports Emmy Awards	2022	Outstanding Technical Team Studio	Monday Night Football with Peyton & Eli	Nominated	
Sports Emmy Awards	2023	Outstanding Sports Personality/Sports Event Analyst	Peyton Manning	Won	
Sports Emmy Awards	2023	Outstanding Sports Personality/Emerging On-Air Talent	Eli Manning	Nominated	
Sports Emmy Awards	2024	Outstanding Live Sports Series	Monday Night Football with Peyton & Eli	Won	
Sports Emmy Awards	2024	The George Wensel Technical Achievement Award	Monday Night Football with Peyton & Eli	Nominated	

== See also ==
- Monday Night Football
