= Fox Saturday Baseball =

- The current logo for Fox Saturday Baseball.
- Also known as: MLB on Fox; Saturday Afternoon Baseball; Major League Baseball Game of the Week
- Genre: American baseball game telecasts
- Presented by: Joe Davis; John Smoltz; Ken Rosenthal
- Opening theme: "MLB on Fox theme music" (1996–2010, 2020–present) "NFL on Fox theme music" (2011–2019)
- Composers: NJJ Music (1996–2010 and 2020–present); Scott Schreer (2011–2019)
- Country of origin: United States
- Original language: English
- No. of seasons: 31 (through 2026 season)

Production
- Production locations: Various MLB stadiums (game telecasts); Fox Network Center, Los Angeles, California (studio segments, pregame, and postgame shows)
- Camera setup: Multi-camera
- Running time: 210 minutes or until game ends (inc. adverts)
- Production companies: Major League Baseball; Fox Sports

Original release
- Network: Fox; FS1/FS2 (overflow coverage only)
- Release: June 1, 1996 – present

Related
- MLB on Fox; Baseball Night in America; MLB on FS1

Fox Saturday Baseball is an American television presentation of Major League Baseball (MLB) games produced by Fox Sports for the Fox network on Saturday afternoons.

Fox's coverage includes 4 weeks worth of coverage as of 2023. Coverage usually includes 2 to 4 separate games all starting at 4PM ET, local affiliates air the game of most interest to their audience.

== History ==
Fox has used numerous scheduling formulas for its Saturday regular season coverage. These have often changed based on the rights granted by new television contracts, and the pregame programs that Fox has chosen to air. From 1996 to 2006, Fox began its weekly game telecasts on the Saturday before, of, or after Memorial Day weekend. The selection of games varied on a regional basis, and the start times were staggered based on region. A half-hour pregame show aired at 12:30 p.m. Eastern Time, followed by game broadcasts held at 1 p.m. in the Eastern and Central Time Zones. West Coast games did not air until 4 p.m. Eastern Time (1 p.m. in the Pacific Time Zone, unless the 1pm ET game features a West Coast team, in which that local market would air the game at 10am PT). All of these games were exclusive to the broadcast network, and as a result, Fox's exclusivity window lasted through the entire afternoon.

In 2007, Fox began airing games every Saturday during the season. A new scheduling format was devised, in which all of the regional games started simultaneously. Fox moved the pregame, which became part of the exclusive game window, to 3:30 p.m. Eastern Time. All of the Fox games would then start at 3:55 p.m. Eastern Time, regardless of region. This format gave more leeway for teams not being shown on Fox to schedule daytime games. Fox's exclusivity began at the start of the pregame at 3:30 and ran until 7 p.m. Eastern.

Fox discontinued its pregame show in 2009, with the telecasts now beginning at 4 p.m. Eastern and the game time being pushed to 4:10. Fox gave up the first half-hour of its exclusivity, with its window now beginning at 4 p.m. Eastern Time. This scheduling formula was used through 2011 for the regular season. Beginning in 2010, several of the Saturday games aired in prime time during the spring. These telecasts used an exclusivity window from 7 to 10:30 p.m. Eastern Time, as the network revived a pregame show for these games, airing at 7 p.m. with the game at 7:15.

In 2012, the pregame show returned full-time, prompting another change in scheduling. The normal scheduling in 2012 and 2013 was for the pregame airing at either 12:30 or 3:30 p.m. Eastern Time. The pregame is not a part of Fox's exclusive window, which began with the game telecast starting a half-hour later. The scheduling did not change for the spring prime time games, however, as the scheduling for these games remained the same as in 2010 and 2011. However these games began being branded as Baseball Night in America games instead of Fox Saturday Baseball.

In 2021 and 2022, Fox did not air Fox Saturday Baseball afternoon games, instead moving its entire MLB schedule to primetime Baseball Night in America windows. For 2023, with an increase in Fox windows, Fox returned to airing four weeks of Fox Saturday Baseball.

== On air staff ==
=== Play-by-play commentators ===
- Joe Davis (Lead)
- Adam Amin
- Kenny Albert
- Kevin Kugler
- Jeff Levering
- Don Orsillo
- Connor Onion
- Eric Collins

=== Color commentators ===
- John Smoltz (Lead)
- A. J. Pierzynski
- Adam Wainwright
- Eric Karros
- Tom Verducci

=== Field reporters ===
- Ken Rosenthal

=== Studio ===
- Kevin Burkhardt (Host)
- Chris Myers (Host)
- Mike Hill (Host)
- Eric Karros (Analyst)
- Mark Sweeney (Analyst)
- Dontrelle Willis (Analyst)
