= List of awards and nominations received by MLB Network =

This is the list of awards and nominations received by MLB Network.

Award	Total wins	Total nominations
Sports Emmys	25	79

== Sports Emmy Award ==
Year	Category	Nominee(s)	Result
2009	Outstanding Studio Show, Daily	MLB Tonight	Nominated
2009	Outstanding Studio Show, Weekly	Studio 42 with Bob Costas	Nominated
2009	Outstanding Sports Personality, Studio Host	Bob Costas	Won
2009	Outstanding Sports Personality, Studio Analyst	Al Leiter	Nominated
2009	Outstanding Sports Personality, Sports Event Analyst	Jim Kaat	Nominated
2009	Outstanding Edited Sports Special	Incident At Candlestick	Nominated
2009	Outstanding Edited Sports Special	Josh Hamilton: Resurrecting the Dream	Nominated
2009	Outstanding Graphic Design	MLB Tonight	Won
2009	Outstanding Production Design/Art Direction	MLB Tonight	Won
2009	Outstanding Technical Team Studio	MLB Tonight	Won
2009	The George Wensel Technical Achievement Award	Ballpark Cam	Nominated
2009	The George Wensel Technical Achievement Award	Enhanced Digital Recreation / Reenactment	Nominated
2010	Outstanding Studio Show, Daily	MLB Tonight	Won
2010	Outstanding Studio Show, Weekly	Studio 42 with Bob Costas	Nominated
2010	Outstanding Sports Personality, Studio Host	Bob Costas	Won
2010	Outstanding Sports Personality, Play-by-Play	Bob Costas	Nominated
2010	Outstanding Sports Personality, Studio Analyst	Harold Reynolds	Nominated
2010	Outstanding Graphic Design	MLB Network Studio Graphics	Nominated
2010	Outstanding Technical Team Studio	MLB Tonight	Nominated
2010	The George Wensel Technical Achievement Award	Ballpark Cam	Nominated
2011	Outstanding Studio Show, Daily	MLB Tonight	Won
2011	Outstanding Sports Personality, Studio Host	Bob Costas	Won
2011	Outstanding Sports Personality, Studio Analyst	Al Leiter	Nominated
2011	Outstanding Sports Personality, Studio Analyst	Harold Reynolds	Nominated
2011	Outstanding Sports Personality, Sports Event Analyst	Jim Kaat	Nominated
2011	Outstanding Sports Promotional Announcement - Institutional	All in One Place (All in One Place; Timeline)	Nominated
2011	Outstanding Technical Team Studio	MLB Tonight	Won
2011	The George Wensel Technical Achievement Award	The DIAMOND Platform	Nominated
2012	Outstanding Studio Show, Daily	MLB Tonight	Won
2012	Outstanding Sports Personality, Studio Analyst	Billy Ripken	Nominated
2012	Outstanding Sports Personality, Studio Analyst	Harold Reynolds	Nominated
2012	Outstanding Sports Personality, Sports Event Analyst	Jim Kaat	Nominated
2012	Outstanding Sports Personality, Sports Reporter	Tom Verducci	Won
2012	Outstanding Open/Tease	MLB Network Division Series (The Scrapbook)	Nominated
2012	Outstanding Graphic Design	MLB Network Division Series (The Scrapbook)	Won
2012	Outstanding Live Event Audio/Sound	MLB Network Spring Training Game - Indians vs. Diamondbacks All Audio	Nominated
2012	Outstanding Technical Team Studio	MLB Tonight	Nominated
2013	Outstanding Studio Show, Daily	MLB Tonight	Nominated
2013	Outstanding Sports Personality, Studio Host	Bob Costas	Won
2013	Outstanding Sports Personality, Play-by-Play	Bob Costas	Nominated
2013	Outstanding Sports Personality, Studio Analyst	Al Leiter	Nominated
2013	Outstanding Sports Personality, Studio Analyst	Harold Reynolds	Won
2013	Outstanding Sports Personality, Studio Analyst	Tom Verducci	Won
2013	Outstanding Sports Personality, Sports Reporter	Tom Verducci	Nominated
2013	Outstanding Open/Tease	MLB Network Division Series (A Field of Dreamers)	Nominated
2013	Outstanding Sports Promotional Announcement - Institutional	MLB Network Prime Time Line Up (Here’s To Us)	Nominated
2013	Outstanding Live Event Graphic Design	Intentional Talk	Nominated
2013	Outstanding Post-Produced Graphic Design	MLB Tonight	Won
2013	Outstanding Production Design/Art Direction	MLB Network Division Series (A Field of Dreamers)	Nominated
2013	Outstanding Technical Team Studio	MLB Tonight	Won
2013	The George Wensel Technical Achievement Award	MLB Network Division Series (A Field of Dreamers)	Nominated
2014	Outstanding Studio Show, Daily	MLB Tonight	Won
2014	Outstanding Sports Personality, Studio Host	Bob Costas	Nominated
2014	Outstanding Sports Personality, Studio Host	Matt Vasgersian	Nominated
2014	Outstanding Sports Personality, Play-by-Play	Bob Costas	Nominated
2014	Outstanding Sports Personality, Studio Analyst	Harold Reynolds	Won
2014	Outstanding Sports Personality, Studio Analyst	Tom Verducci	Nominated
2014	Outstanding Sports Personality, Sports Event Analyst	Harold Reynolds	Nominated
2014	Outstanding Sports Personality, Sports Reporter	Ken Rosenthal	Won
2014	Outstanding Sports Personality, Sports Reporter	Tom Verducci	Nominated
2014	Outstanding Edited Sports Special	Mr. Baseball: Bob Uecker	Nominated
2014	Outstanding Open/Tease	2014 Baseball Hall of Fame Induction Ceremony (Hall of Heroes)	Nominated
2014	Outstanding Sports Promotional Announcement	Monuments	Nominated
2014	Outstanding Long Form Editing	The Third Team	Nominated
2014	Outstanding Music Composition/Direction/Lyrics	2014 Baseball Hall of Fame Induction Ceremony (Hall of Heroes)	Nominated
2014	Outstanding Production Design/Art Direction	2014 Baseball Hall of Fame Induction Ceremony (Hall of Heroes)	Won
2014	Outstanding Technical Team Studio	MLB Tonight	Nominated
2015	Outstanding Studio Show, Daily	MLB Tonight	Won
2015	Outstanding Sports Personality, Studio Host	Bob Costas	Won
2015	Outstanding Sports Personality, Studio Analyst	Al Leiter	Nominated
2015	Outstanding Sports Personality, Studio Analyst	Harold Reynolds	Nominated
2015	Outstanding Sports Personality, Studio Analyst	Billy Ripken	Won
2015	Outstanding Sports Personality, Sports Reporter	Ken Rosenthal	Won
2015	Outstanding Sports Personality, Sports Reporter	Tom Verducci	Nominated
2015	Outstanding Post-Produced Graphic Design	MLB Central	Nominated
2015	Outstanding Studio Design/Art Direction	Studio 21	Nominated
2015	Outstanding Production Design/Art Direction	MLB Network Divisional Playoffs (Little Big Men)	Nominated
2015	Outstanding Technical Team Studio	MLB Tonight	Nominated
2015	The George Wensel Technical Achievement Award	MLB Network Showcase - Statcast Powered by Amazon Web Services	Nominated
