= Baseball Night in America =

- The current logo for Baseball Night in America.
- Also known as: MLB on Fox; Fox Saturday Baseball; Saturday Night Baseball; Thursday Night Baseball; Major League Baseball Game of the Week
- Genre: American baseball game telecasts
- Presented by: Joe Davis; John Smoltz; Ken Rosenthal; Adam Amin; A. J. Pierzynski; Adam Wainwright; Tom Verducci
- Opening theme: "MLB on Fox theme music" (2020–present) "NFL on Fox theme music" (2012–2019)
- Composers: NJJ Music (2020–present); Scott Schreer (2012–2019)
- Country of origin: United States
- Original language: English
- No. of seasons: 15 (through 2026 season)

Production
- Production locations: Various MLB stadiums (game telecasts); Fox Network Center, Los Angeles, California (studio segments, pregame, and postgame shows)
- Camera setup: Multi-camera
- Running time: 210 minutes or until game ends (inc. adverts)
- Production companies: Major League Baseball; Fox Sports

Original release
- Network: Fox; FS1/FS2 (overflow coverage only)
- Release: May 26, 2012 – present

Related
- MLB on Fox

Baseball Night in America is an American television presentation of Major League Baseball (MLB) games produced by Fox Sports for the Fox network on Saturday nights.

Fox's coverage includes 24 weeks worth of coverage as of 2026. Coverage usually includes 2 to 4 separate games all starting at 7PM ET, with local affiliates airing the game of most interest to their audience.

== History ==
While Fox has aired Fox Saturday Baseball games since 1996, Fox only began using the Baseball Night in America branding in 2012. In the inaugural season, the Baseball Night in America branding was used for games from May 19 to July 7.

Until 2021, Baseball Night in America aired every Saturday from the last week in May to the second week in July. Beginning with the 2019 season, late season Fox Saturday Baseball games moved from the afternoon to prime time. therefore a separate section of games was added for September. Some of these September games aired on Thursday night as Thursday Night Baseball.

For the first time since 2020, during the 2023 season, Fox also aired afternoon Fox Saturday Baseball games on April 1, 22, and 29 and June 24.

For the 2026 season, Fox will air Baseball Night in America on every Saturday of the season except for June 13 and 27 and July 11 (when the network will be carrying the 2026 FIFA World Cup) and September 12 and 19 (for Fox College Football coverage), along with Thursday night games on September 3 and 17. Unlike previous seasons where there were a limited amount of Saturday afternoon games, all of the windows that were previously featured are now included in the Baseball Night in America package.

== On air staff ==
=== Play-by-play commentators ===
- Joe Davis (Lead)
- Adam Amin
- Kevin Kugler
- Don Orsillo
- Connor Onion
- Kenny Albert
- Alex Faust
- Jeff Levering
- Aaron Goldsmith

=== Color commentators ===
- John Smoltz (Lead)
- Eric Karros
- A.J. Pierzynski
- Tom Verducci
- Mark Sweeney
- Dontrelle Willis
- Adam Wainwright

=== Field reporters ===
- Ken Rosenthal
- Tom Verducci

=== Studio ===
- Kevin Burkhardt (Host)
- Chris Myers (Host)
- Mike Hill (Host)
- Eric Karros (Analyst)
- Mark Sweeney (Analyst)
- Dontrelle Willis (Analyst)

== See also ==
- MLB on Fox
- MLB on FS1
- Thursday Night Baseball
