= Night Baseball =

A night game is a baseball game played partially or entirely after sunset. Night Baseball may refer to the following broadcast programs:

- Sunday Night Baseball
- Monday Night Baseball
- Tuesday Night Baseball
- Wednesday Night Baseball
- Thursday Night Baseball
- Friday Night Baseball
- Baseball Night in America, typically on Saturdays

== See also ==
- Baseball Tonight
