= Outstanding Sports Personality, Sports Reporter =

The Sports Emmy Award for Outstanding Sports Personality, Sports Reporter was first awarded in 2011. It is awarded to whom the National Academy of Television Arts and Sciences judges to be the best sports reporter in a calendar year.

== List of winners ==
2011: Michele Tafoya (NBC)

2012: Pierre McGuire (NBC/NBC Sports Network) / Tom Verducci (MLB Network/TBS)

2013: Michele Tafoya (2) (NBC)

2014: Ken Rosenthal (FOX/Fox Sports 1/MLB Network)

2015: Ken Rosenthal (2) (FOX/Fox Sports 1/foxsports.com/MLB Network)

2016: Craig Sager† (CBS/TBS/TNT/truTV)

2017: Tom Verducci (2) (MLB Network/FOX)

2018: Michele Tafoya (3) (NBC)

2019: Michele Tafoya (4) (NBC)

2020: Tom Verducci (3) (MLB Network/FOX)

2021: Michele Tafoya (5) (NBC)

2022: Holly Rowe (ESPN)

2023: Lisa Salters (ABC/ESPN)

2024: Tracy Wolfson (CBS)

2025: Tracy Wolfson (2) (CBS)

†awarded posthumously
