= MLB Network =

American television sports channel dedicated to baseball

- Country: United States
- Broadcast area: United States; Puerto Rico; Canada; Latin America; Caribbean; Europe; Philippines
- Headquarters: One MLB Network Plaza, Secaucus, New Jersey, U.S.

Programming
- Languages: English and Spanish
- Picture format: 720p (HDTV) (downgraded to letterboxed 480i for the SDTV feed)

Ownership
- Owner: Major League Baseball (67.01%); TNT Sports (Skydance; 16.67%); Charter Communications (8.16%); NBC Sports Group (Comcast; 8.16%)
- Sister channels: MLB Network Radio; NHL Network

History
- Launched: January 1, 2009; 17 years ago

Links
- Website: mlb.com/network

MLB Network is an American television sports channel dedicated to baseball. It is primarily owned by Major League Baseball, with Skydance's TNT Sports, Comcast's NBC Sports Group and Charter Communications having minority ownership.

The channel's headquarters and studios are located at their leased facilities in Secaucus, New Jersey, a building owned by Hartz Mountain Industries which formerly housed MSNBC's studios. MLB Network's studios also house NHL Network, which came under the management of MLB Advanced Media in mid-2015 and transferred most operations from the network's former Toronto home base.

Tony Petitti, former executive producer of CBS Sports, was named the network's first president. Petitti served as MLB Network's president until December 2014, when he was appointed as Chief Operating Officer of Major League Baseball. Rob McGlarry, who worked as Senior and later Executive Vice-president of Business Affairs at MLB Network since 2009, was named the network's second president.

As of November 2023, MLB Network is available to approximately 31,000,000 pay television households in the United States, down from its 2013 peak of 71,000,000 households, though the network is also available separately through the league's app, either as a monthly offering or bundled into its streaming service, MLB.tv.

== History ==
Major League Baseball became the fourth major North American professional sports league to launch its own 24-hour cable network. NBA TV dates back to 1999, the NHL Network to 2001 (though not in the United States until 2007), and the NFL Network to 2003. However, MLB Network is carried in the most households of these four networks, as it is available on all of the top-ten video operators in the United States.

MLB Network soft-launched on December 16, 2008, with a rolling automated loop of archival programming and promotions for the network for cable systems that carried the network's transmissions leading up to the January 1, 2009 launch. The channel fully launched at 6:00 p.m. EST with the premiere of Hot Stove.

In April 2012, MLB Network's standard definition feed shifted to a 16:9 letterbox format. Both of the network's SD and HD feeds now show the same format.

On April 4, 2016, MLB Network debuted a new on-air graphics package optimized for the 16:9 format, replacing the previous on-air look used since the network's New Year's Day 2009 launch.

On January 31, 2023, MLB Network was removed from YouTube TV's channel lineup after they failed to reach a contract renewal agreement.

In July 2024, MLB Network launched a direct-to-consumer streaming service, featuring the network bundled in with radio play-by-play for $5.99 a month, or as part of a MLB.tv subscription.

=== Carriage ===
The network has signed contracts with numerous cable and satellite carriers, including DirecTV, Dish Network, Verizon Fios, Cablevision, Charter Communications, Comcast, Cox Communications, and U-verse TV. In a deal that was pioneered by other sports league owned channels, MLB tied carriage of MLB Network to the ability to carry the popular out of market MLB Extra Innings package. In return, cable and satellite providers were offered a minority share of the new network.

==== Satellite radio ====
The network also features a radio arm on SiriusXM, MLB Network Radio (channel 89) that simulcasts some MLB Network television content such as MLB Tonight and Hot Stove among its own schedule of original programming and podcasts, along with national play-by-play from games broadcast by Major League Baseball on ESPN Radio or highlight coverage from other team radio networks; formerly known as MLB Home Plate before the 2010 season, it took its current name on April 4, 2010.

=== Carriage Outside USA ===
==== Canadian carriage ====
At launch, no announcement was made about MLB Network availability in Canada, home of the Toronto Blue Jays. Network officials had been in contact with Blue Jays owner Rogers Communications (owner of Rogers Cable, the largest cable provider in Canada) about making MLB Network available in Canada, but emphasized prior to the channel's launch that a deal was not imminent.

In August 2008, Rogers secured Canadian Radio-television and Telecommunications Commission (CRTC) approval for a Canadian digital channel tentatively called "Baseball TV". This license could have been used to launch a localized version of MLB Network with domestic advertising and additional Canadian content, along the lines of NBA TV Canada, which is owned by the parent company of the Toronto Raptors but uses much of the content of the league's U.S. channel NBA TV. It was reported initially that Rogers intended to pursue this approach to bring MLB Network to Canada. However, the licence was issued on the condition the channel launch by August 2011, which did not occur.

Rogers ultimately agreed to sponsor MLB Network's request to be added to the CRTC's list of approved foreign television services, which would permit Canadian cable and satellite providers to import the American feed, as has occurred previously with similar niche-sports services such as Big Ten Network, NFL Network, and Golf Channel. The application was published for public comment on June 13, 2012 and was approved on November 21, 2012. In the interim, the Rogers-owned Sportsnet One aired selected programs from MLB Network, including Quick Pitch and Intentional Talk.

MLB Network was added to Rogers Cable systems in Ontario on January 8, 2014, in both standard and high definition. On June 3, 2015, SaskTel announced that it would begin carrying MLB Network. As of 2017, it is also available on MTS and Vidéotron.

On March 23, 2017, MLB Network launched on Bell Fibe TV and Bell Satellite TV.

Shaw Cable, the dominant carrier in Western Canada, does not offer MLB Network.

As of 2018, MLB Network is carried nationwide in Canada on the DAZN streaming service.

==== Availability outside the United States and Canada ====
MLB Network is also carried by paid-tv providers in Bahamas, Caribbean islands, Panamá and other Latin American countries.

== High definition and 4K ==
The 720p high-definition simulcast of MLB Network launched simultaneously to the regular channel. After much discussion, MLB Network decided to use the 720p format instead of 1080-line-interlace because it believes 720p shows the motion of baseball more accurately and will degrade less when recompressed by cable operators to save bandwidth (most of the regional Fox Sports Networks use the same format). As Mark Haden (VP of engineering and IT of MLB Network) says: "That's our best shot of maintaining quality to viewers." All studio programs and original shows are shot in HD, as well as all self-produced games such as those of the 2009 World Baseball Classic and Thursday Night Baseball, as well as simulcasted locally produced games and contracted game packages it handles such as YouTube and Apple TV+'s Friday Night Baseball. The network also remastered 30 World Series films in high definition.

On April 14, 2016, it was announced that 25 MLB Network Showcase games would be broadcast in 4K ultra-high definition exclusively on DirecTV in the 2016 season, beginning April 15.

== Programming ==
=== Live game coverage ===
==== Regular season ====
MLB Network airs several live games a week. These games are blacked out in the participating markets of the two teams (unless listed otherwise). Blacked-out markets receive an alternate game or pre-taped programming.

- MLB Network Showcase: MLB Network's weekly presentation of self-produced non-exclusive games each every other night. As of September 25, 2025, Matt Vasgersian, Paul Severino and Rich Waltz provide play-by-play. Normally, as of June 10, 2023, Dan Plesac and Tom Verducci provide color commentary with Al Leiter, Sean Casey, Harold Reynolds, or Bill Ripken also providing occasional color commentary. Normally, Tom Verducci, Jon Morosi and others handle on-field reporting.
- Other night games: MLB Network airs games on every night, simulcast from one team's local TV broadcaster (or from MLB Local Media if a team's broadcasts are distributed in that manner). On Tuesday nights, MLB Network features one game coverage if available (due to TBS's Tuesday package), with an early East Coast game, a later West Coast game (depending on what window TBS selects) or both if TBS elected to not air any games that night due to a doubleheader on another week or none because TBS is airing games in both slots.
- MLB Matinee: MLB Network airs a series of afternoon games throughout the regular season. As with night games, these matinee games usually but not always feature simulcasts of the home team's local telecast. In some cases, MLB shows the road team's broadcast.
- Minor League Baseball: MLB Network will occasionally pick up Minor League Baseball games being broadcast by its cable TV partners. This has included Triple-A and Double-A games along with minor league all-star games.

==== Postseason ====
When MLB expanded the playoffs in 2012 and created the wild-card round, TBS won the broadcast rights for both games, and in exchange, two Division Series games shifted to MLB Network, the first postseason games in their history. The first telecast took place on October 7 and featured the Detroit Tigers hosting the Oakland Athletics at Comerica Park in Detroit for game two of the 2012 ALDS. Matt Vasgersian called the game alongside analyst Jim Kaat. The second telecast took place on October 10 and featured the Washington Nationals hosting the St. Louis Cardinals at Nationals Park in Washington, D.C., for game three of the 2012 NLDS; this was the Nationals' first home postseason game since moving to Washington at the start of the 2005 season. Bob Costas provided the play-by-play commentary alongside analyst Jim Kaat.

Starting in 2014, as part of Fox's new eight year rights agreement, MLB Network would air two Division Series games from the league assigned to Fox for each postseason.

This arrangement was originally announced as continuing with a new rights deal in 2022. However, starting with the 2022 postseason, MLB Network returned the English-language rights to these games to Fox, and then took the Spanish-language rights to whichever postseason series are carried by TBS instead (replacing CNN en Español). In 2024, MLB sub-licensed these Spanish-language rights to TelevisaUnivision.

In 2025, due to the rain delay of the Mariners-Tigers game, MLB Network simulcast that game in English to allow FS1 to air Blue Jays-Yankees on time to maximize availability. Mariners-Tigers was also shown on FS2.

==== Non-MLB games ====
As of 2025, in addition to Major League Baseball coverage, MLB Network also airs minor league, fall league, international, and college baseball and softball games. Minor League coverage includes the All-Star Futures Game and the Triple-A National Championship Game. Fall league coverage features games from the Arizona Fall League. International coverage includes qualifiers for the World Baseball Classic, the Caribbean Series, and the Choque de Gigantes. College baseball and softball coverage include the NFCA Division I Leadoff Classic, the MLB Desert Invitational, the Andre Dawson Classic, the Astros Foundation College Classic and the West Coast League.

Beginning in June 2025, MLB Network began broadcasting Athletes Unlimited Softball League games.

==== Fox Saturday Baseball pre-game show ====
In 2012, MLB Network took over the pre-game production responsibilities for the MLB on Fox package, producing Baseball Night in America and postseason pre-game shows from Secaucus and on-location. The show featured Matt Vasgersian or Greg Amsinger and two analysts from a rotating roster of MLB Network's personalities (Eric Byrnes, Kevin Millar, Dan Plesac, Harold Reynolds, Bill Ripken, or Mitch Williams). The show used Fox's graphics and theme songs. Fox took back control of the pregame show in 2014 when the Game of the Week package was eliminated.

=== Daily shows ===
MLB Network produces promos for its current MLB Network original series which air on a regular basis, as well as for films that MLB Network broadcasts. MLB Network also airs promos for special events that it airs and different games that it broadcasts live.

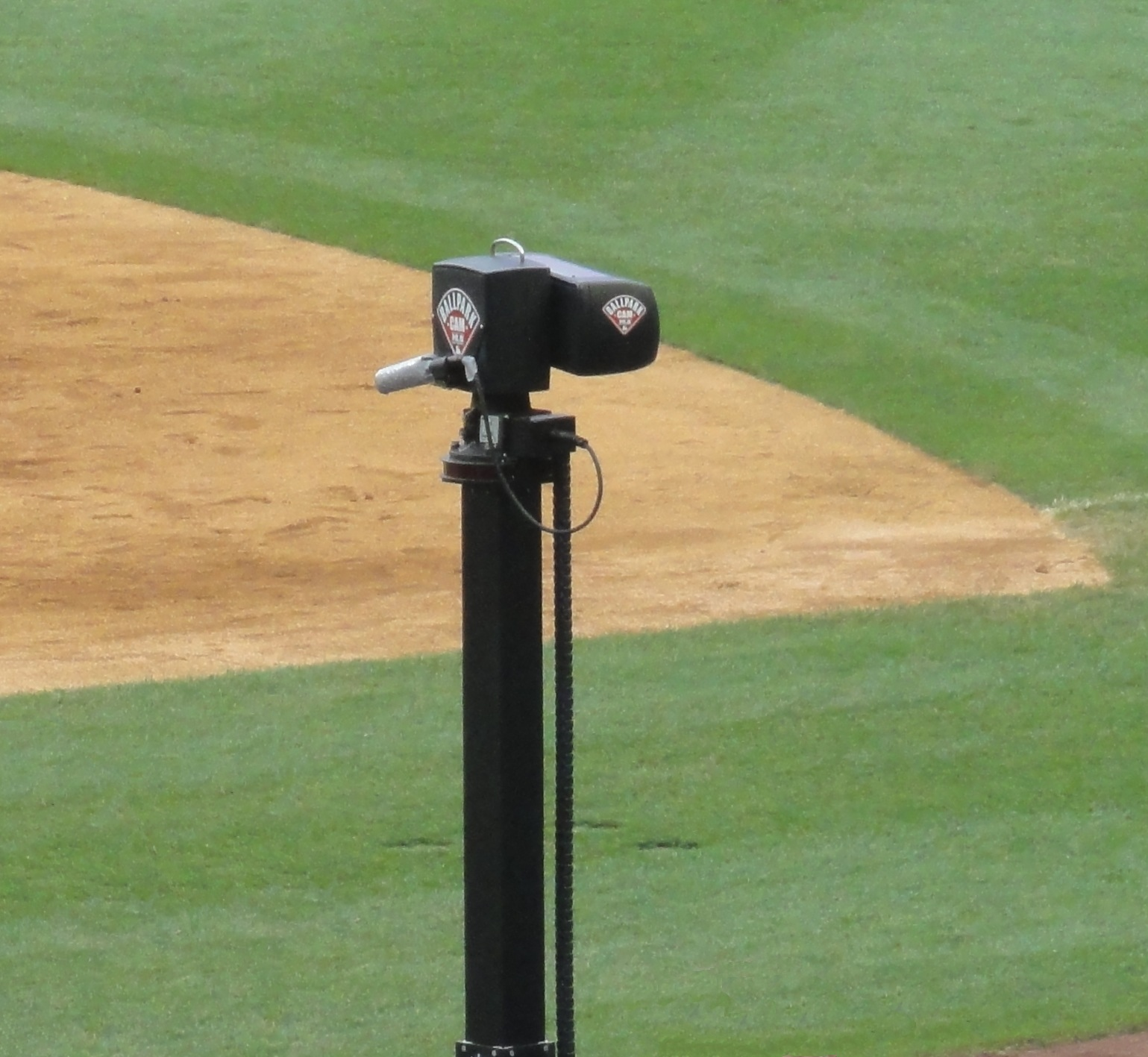
An MLB Network "ballpark cam" at Yankee Stadium.

- MLB Tonight: The signature show of MLB Network, which debuted at the start of 2009 Spring Training in a 60-minute format; as of 2011, the show airs seven days a week during the regular season, and is now a full-year program. The show has updates, highlights, news, and analysis. The original plan was also to feature exclusive live look-ins using their own permanent HD cameras with shots not available on any of the channels covering the game; however, MLBN has decided to use "ballpark cam" only before and after games. Live cut-ins simulcast from the stations/networks covering the games. In 2011, MLB Tonight won a Sports Emmy Award for Outstanding Studio Show - Daily.
- Hot Stove: Until 2012, Hot Stove was a re-branded version of MLB Tonight for the winter, generally airing at the same times from the same set but with different graphics. Like MLB Tonight, it was the signature program on MLB Network from November until March during the major league off-season, featuring news reports and analysis of all offseason moves as teams prepare for the upcoming season. It gets its name from the baseball term Hot stove league. On November 12, 2012, Hot Stove became a live weekday morning show hosted by Matt Vasgersian and Harold Reynolds, now currently airing at 10:00 AM ET and repeated during the day. MLB Tonight continued as before, under that name, in its customary time slot (when not moved for awards presentations or special programs).
- Quick Pitch: A 60-minute daily fast-paced show of highlights from that day's games and currently hosted by Abby Labar. Premiered April 12, 2009. Currently, it airs live at the conclusion of MLB Tonight or the last live game of the night and then repeats throughout the overnight and morning hours until 9 AM ET.
- MLB Now: The series premiered April 1, 2013, and new episodes air Monday thru Friday on MLB Network. Season one had Brian Kenny and Harold Reynolds debating about baseball's daily events and news with Reynolds taking the "traditional" perspective and Kenny using sabermetrics to approach each topic. The debate was moderated by Kristina Fitzpatrick. The season one finale aired in early October. On February 26, 2014, host Brian Kenny announced via Twitter that MLB Now had been renewed for a second season to premiere in April 2014. Season two saw some changes as Reynolds and Fitzpatrick exited the show, which now centers around Kenny and three other guests that include one MLB on-air personality and two former or current players, managers, general managers, journalists, reporters, or analysts. The format is similar but Kenny acts as moderator and also debates with the guests. Currently, it airs Weekdays at 12 PM ET.
- The Rundown: A two-hour show that premiered in 2011, hosted by Scott Braun and various analysts, provides looks at day games in progress, batting practice, recaps of the previous day's action and previews of the upcoming contests. In 2012, The Rundown expanded to three hours. In 2013, The Rundown moved back to 2 hours. Replaced by Off Base in 2022.
- Intentional Talk: Another show that premiered in 2011, using the traditional sports talk radio format previously hosted by Chris Rose (and later Stephen Nelson) and Kevin Millar about the events of the day and include interviews with players and managers. Currently, it airs Weekdays at 5 PM ET during the Regular Season. Siera Santos replaced Nelson in 2023 with Ryan Dempster joining Millar as a second analyst. On October 18, 2026 Santos, Dempster, and Millar announced that Intentional Talk was cancelled and that the series finale would air on November 4, 2026.
- High Heat: The series premiered March 31, 2014 and ended on November 1, 2024 and was hosted by Chris Russo with Alanna Rizzo as co-host. It aired Monday–Friday year-round. On November 1, 2024, Chris Russo announced that High Heat had been cancelled and that the final episode would air that day.
- MLB Central: A 3 to 4-hour news magazine-style show that currently, airs weekdays at 10 AM ET and is co-hosted by Lauren Shehadi, Mark DeRosa, and Robert Flores. Cut down to 2 hours in 2023.
- Off Base: A one-hour show introduced in April 2022, specifically catered to young audiences with pop culture influences. Hosted by Lauren Gardner with Xavier Scruggs, Hannah Keyser and Keith McPherson serving as analysts. Keyser and McPherson left after 1 season and were replaced by Ariel Epstein and a rotating guest analyst.
- Pregame Spread: A one-hour program hosted by Matt Vasgersian focused on sports betting which aired in 2022 but was cancelled after 1 season.
- The Leadoff Spot: A one-hour radio simulcast that currently airs Weekdays at 9 AM ET and is hosted by Steve Phillips, Xavier Scruggs, and Eduardo Pérez as they focus on a front row seat as a former front office executive and former player discuss and debate baseball’s headline stories, teams and players.

=== Other ===
- All Time Games: Classic baseball games, shown in their original televised form. The premiere episode on January 1, 2009, was a kinescope of NBC's coverage of Game 5 of the 1956 World Series in which Don Larsen hurled the Fall Classic's only perfect game. The game included all original Gillette advertisements from the NBC coverage, and was framed by a sit-down interview by Bob Costas with Larsen and his catcher, Yogi Berra.
- 30 Clubs in 30 Days: In February, the network embarks on a month-long tour of spring training camps with John Hart as host, coming from a different facility each day. In 2023, it was temporarily renamed as Spring Training Sprint, which features two teams in both the Cactus League and the Grapefruit League each day due to World Baseball Classic coverage, and in 2024, it was once again renamed to 30 Clubs in 15 Days. For 2026, the event was rebranded 30 Clubs, 30 Camps.
- 30 Clubs, 30 Report Cards: A sequel to 30 Teams in 30 Days, in July, host John Hart looks back at predictions made during the spring and grades each team's performance thus far through the season.
- 30 Clubs, 30 Recaps: The offseason version of the above which airs during Hot Stove, premiered December 7, 2009, recaps each team's season and looks ahead to next season.
- 30 Games, 30 Clubs, 30 Days: In 2010 and 2011, MLB Network aired 30 live regular season games, featuring all 30 teams, during the month of April.
- Diamond Demos: An instructional show featuring an expert in a certain aspect of baseball. Episodes have included infielding with Ozzie Smith, catching with Joe Girardi, outfielding with Torii Hunter, pitching with Jeff Brantley, and coaching with Buck Showalter. The show premiered April 6.
- October Classics is re-airings of World Series in their entirety. Each week a different series has been featured.
- Prime 9: A series devoted to the topic of the nine greatest in anything involved with baseball. The series in run in marathons on holidays such as Thanksgiving and Christmas. A second season with updated content was commissioned for MLBN in 2023.
- Studio 42 with Bob Costas is an interview show with prominent baseball figures. The premiere episode on February 5 was with Joe Torre about his new tell-all book The Yankee Years, which has been regarded as controversial among Yankees players, especially Alex Rodriguez. Another famous episode featured an interview with Frick Award-winning announcer Ernie Harwell, his last television appearance before his death six months later.
- Front Burner: The channel's insiders have a round table discussion about the off-season, and take questions and comments from viewers via phone calls, emails, Facebook and Twitter.
- Baseball IQ: A game show hosted by Matt Vasgersian in which two participants answer baseball trivia for a chance to win up to $45,000 for charity.
- World Baseball Classic Tonight: A show similar to MLB Tonight, World Baseball Classic Tonight features highlights, analysis and special reports on the tournament. Returned 2023 but as a special MLB Tonight themed coverage of the WBC.
- Inside MLB: The series premiered November 11, 2013 and new episodes aired Mondays at 10 pm on MLB Network until January 2014.
- Top 100 Right Now/MLB Countdown: Dedicated to counting down the best players and/or league moments.
- Bleacher Features: The network's presentation of baseball-themed feature films.
- MLB's Travelling Spaceship Show: Debuting in 2024 as part of the network's 15th anniversary, it tackles historic league moments and TV and filmed interviews through the past century and a half of pro baseball and of the MLB in general.
- Carded: Baseball training cards themed show, debuted 2023.

=== Documentaries ===
- Baseball's Seasons: A documentary series set against the events of a certain baseball season.
- Inside the Moments: A series premiering January 2 that features memorable moments and the stories behind them. The first five episodes are "Aura of the Home Run", "Icons of the Game", "Unforgettable Feats", "Magic on the Mound", and "Fall Classic Finales". This show was originally produced by ESPN during the 2002 season as part of a promotion sponsored by MasterCard in which fans voted to determine the best moment in MLB history.
- Pride and Perseverance: The Story of the Negro Leagues: A one-hour special narrated by Hall of Famer Dave Winfield on the history of Negro league baseball prior to Jackie Robinson's debut on April 15, 1947.
- Rising Sons: A documentary on how Japanese players have adjusted to life in America.
- We Are Young, a story about Dmitri Young, Delmon Young, and their father, Larry Young.
- Josh Hamilton: Resurrecting the Dream: chronicles the life of Josh Hamilton.
- The Pen: followed the bullpen of the 2009 Philadelphia Phillies.
- The Club: followed the 2010 Chicago White Sox.
- MLB Network Presents: A series of hour-long films focusing on a subject in baseball, such as a former player or an event or team in baseball history.
- MLB's 20 Greatest Games: A series that originally aired in 2010 that counted down the greatest MLB games of the past 50 seasons, as voted on by fans on MLB.com. The episodes were hosted by Bob Costas and Tom Verducci, sitting down with the players or managers involved in either the game that was the focus of the episode, or the memorable moment from the game, while watching the original television broadcast of the game, providing their own input into the games and the moments, as well as how their careers and lives were changed by the game.

=== Repeats ===
- Baseball: A Film by Ken Burns: The Emmy Award-winning documentary mini-series, which originally aired on PBS in 1994, was aired on MLB Network in 2009.
- Cathedrals of the Game: takes viewers on tours of MLB stadiums and explores the history of the team and city (originally produced by iNHD in 2005).

== MLB Strike Zone ==
Strike Zone logo used in 2017

MLB Strike Zone is a channel launched on April 10, 2012, which allows viewers to see every game across MLB with up-to-the-minute highlights, live look-ins and updates, without commercials. The channel's format to similar to NFL RedZone and currently airs on Wednesday and Friday nights during the regular season. Though coverage often ends before most West Coast games start, those games are usually covered carousel-style on MLB Tonight on the main channel most evenings. Gregg Caserta is the current host of the show, which usually lasts about three hours.

=== International broadcast ===
Strike Zone airs live in Canada on TSN, Australia on ESPN Australia, Latin America on Fox Sports, along with other countries.

== Studios ==
The Secaucus-based studios have four main sets, three of which are named after hall of famers. "Studio 3", named in honor of Babe Ruth, serves as the home for the majority of the studio programs, while "Studio 42", honoring Jackie Robinson, is a half-scale baseball field where demonstrations by the network's analysts take place, along with interview programs where an audience is needed for atmosphere. Studio 42 is also the home of the early rounds of the Major League Baseball draft. The studio includes seating for over 125 people, along with elements such as a functioning manual scoreboard and a standings wall for each league and division.

With the launch of Intentional Talk in 2011, it was one of the first regular programs on television to use a remote production home studio setup on a regular basis, well before the 2020 COVID-19 pandemic necessitated it across the industry. If either host could not record in Secaucus, former host Chris Rose would record from a home studio in Los Angeles (the same with current co-host Stephen Nelson), while Kevin Millar records from his home studio in Austin, Texas, jocularly known as "Studio 1-5" for his uniform number.

On November 12, 2012, MLB Network introduced a third set, "Studio K", for the new daily morning offseason show Hot Stove and guests analysts/insiders on High Heat. During the premiere episode, hosts Matt Vasgersian and Harold Reynolds said that the studio was constructed from the building's mailroom, explaining its small size. After Rose left the network in 2020 and Stephen Nelson was named the new co-host of Intentional Talk in 2021, Nelson co-hosts the show from Studio K. In 2020 and again in 2021, due to the ongoing COVID-19 pandemic, MLB Network Showcase games were called remotely from Studio K.

In 2015, the network introduced a fourth set, "Studio 21", named in honor of Roberto Clemente. The studio hosts the shows MLB Central, MLB Now, and Quick Pitch along with the presentation of the BBWAA Awards.

The network had planned to launch permanent studios from a new tower in Manhattan's Harlem neighborhood by 2011. However, because of the Great Recession, the building project was scaled back and later canceled in late November 2008, with MLB deciding on a permanent setup in Secaucus instead.

With the August 2015 announcement that MLB Advanced Media would take over the digital properties of the National Hockey League, it was announced that NHL Network would relocate its studios and operations to the facilities of MLB Network. The channel temporarily originated its studio programming from Studio K and Studio 21 until April 2016, when a new dedicated studio known as "The Rink" was completed as part of the Studio 21 wing. To promote the 2016 NHL Stadium Series at the Colorado Rockies' Coors Field, a scale hockey rink was built inside Studio 42 in February 2016 for cross-promotional appearances on NHL Network and MLB Network.

In February 2025, MLB Network announced plans to build a new, $100 million studio at 25 Market St. in Elmwood Park, New Jersey.

== See also ==
- List of awards and nominations received by MLB Network
