= MLB on Fox =

MLB baseball broadcast telecasts (1996–present)

- MLB on Fox logo, used since May 21, 2016
- Also known as: Fox MLB; Fox Saturday Baseball (Afternoon game telecasts); Baseball Night in America (Night game telecasts); Fox Thursday Night Baseball (Thursday game telecasts); Major League Baseball Game of the Week
- Genre: American baseball game telecasts
- Presented by: Joe Davis; John Smoltz; Ken Rosenthal; Tom Verducci; Adam Amin; A. J. Pierzynski; Adam Wainwright; Eric Karros; Kevin Burkhardt; Alex Rodriguez; David Ortiz; Derek Jeter; Dontrelle Willis (see below)
- Theme music composer: NJJ Music (1996–2010 and 2020–present); Jochen Flach (2007–2010); Scott Schreer (2010–2019)
- Opening theme: "MLB on Fox theme music" (1996–2010; 2020–present) "NFL on Fox theme music" (2010–2019)
- Composers: NJJ Music (1996–2010 and 2020–present); Pete Calandra (2007–2010); Jochen Flach (2007–2010); Scott Schreer (2010–2019)
- Country of origin: United States
- Original language: English
- No. of seasons: 31 (through 2026 season)

Production
- Producers: Michael Weisman (senior producer); Lindz Rae (lead games)
- Production locations: Various MLB stadiums (game telecasts); Fox Network Center, Los Angeles, California (studio segments, pregame and postgame shows)
- Editor: Bill Webb (lead games)
- Camera setup: Multi-camera
- Running time: 210 minutes or until game ends (inc. adverts)
- Production companies: Major League Baseball; Fox Sports

Original release
- Network: Fox
- Release: June 1, 1996 – present

Related
- MLB on FS1; Fox Saturday Baseball; Baseball Night in America

The television broadcasts of Major League Baseball have been produced and aired by American sports broadcaster Fox Sports, the sports division of the Fox Broadcasting Company (Fox), since June 1, 1996 under the Major League Baseball on Fox (also known as MLB on Fox and Fox MLB) banner. Fox has aired the World Series in 1996, 1998, and every edition since 2000, and the All-Star Game in 1997, 1999, and every year since 2001. It has also aired the National League Championship Series (NLCS) and American League Championship Series (ALCS) in alternate years from 1996 to 2000 and since 2007, with the NLCS in even years and the ALCS in odd years (Fox aired both series from 2001 to 2006).

In 2022, Fox Sports renewed its television rights for regular season games for both the main Fox broadcast network and FS1 through 2028. Per the contract, Fox airs regular-season MLB games each Saturday. Fox continues to exclusively broadcast the World Series, All-Star Game, and Field of Dreams Game for the life of the contract.

In addition to the national broadcasts, regional MLB games were also shown on the Fox Sports Regional Networks, which later became FanDuel Sports Network after several ownership changes from 1996 to 2026.

== History ==
=== 1996–2000 ===
On November 7, 1995, Major League Baseball (MLB) reached a television deal with Fox and NBC, allowing Fox to obtain MLB game rights (assuming ABC's end of the contract). Fox paid $575 million for the five-year contract, a fraction less of the amount of money that CBS had paid for the Major League Baseball television rights for the 1990–1993 seasons.

Unlike the previous television deal, "The Baseball Network" (a partnership created through the league's joint contract with ABC and NBC that began in the 1994 season), Fox reverted to the format of televising regular season games (approximately 16 weekly telecasts that normally began on Memorial Day weekend) on Saturday afternoons. Fox did, however, continue a format that The Baseball Network started by offering a selection of games based purely on a viewer's region. Fox's approach has usually been to offer three regionalized telecasts. The initial deal also gave Fox the rights to broadcast the 1996, 1998 and 2000 World Series, the 1997 and 1999 All-Star Games, as well as coverage of the League Championship Series (shared with NBC) and five Division Series games each year.

When Fox first began carrying baseball, it used the motto "Same game, new attitude." to promote the telecasts, which had previously been used to promote Fox's National Football League (NFL) coverage when it began in 1994. Fox's primary goal when it first began airing Major League Baseball games was to promote their weak prime time schedule (which at the time included only a handful of hits, such as established series Beverly Hills 90210, The Simpsons, Married... with Children and The X-Files). Fox Sports president Ed Goren said, "We'll use the World Series and League Championship Series to spur our shows".

=== Exclusivity: 2001–2006 ===
In September 2000, Major League Baseball reached a six-year, $2.5 billion contract with Fox that allowed it to retain rights to Saturday baseball games, and included rights to the All-Star Game, select Division Series games and exclusive coverage of the League Championship Series and World Series. 90% of the contract's value to Fox, which paid Major League Baseball $417 million per year under the deal, came from the postseason, which not only attracted large audiences, but also provided an opportunity for Fox to showcase its fall schedule.

The contract protected Major League Baseball in the event of a labor dispute (something that did not occur with "The Baseball Network" in 1994). If some of the games were cancelled as a result of a strike or lockout, Major League Baseball would still be paid by Fox, but had to compensate Fox with additional telecasts. On the other hand, a repeat of the 1994 league strike would have cost Fox well over $1 billion; the television contract created an incentive not to cause a strike, as it would hurt broadcast networks since they paid for the deal, unlike the 1994–95 television package.

Under the previous five-year contract, Fox paid $575 million (totaling $115 million per year) for the Major League Baseball rights, while NBC only paid $400 million ($80 million annually). The difference between the Fox and the NBC contracts was that the deal implicitly valued Fox's Saturday "Game of the Week" telecasts at less than $90 million for five years. Before NBC officially decided to part ways with Major League Baseball (for the second time in about 12 years) on September 26, 2000, Fox would have had to pay $345 million for the contract, while NBC would have paid $240 million. With the exception of the four-year absence from 1990 to 1993, NBC had carried Major League Baseball broadcasts since 1947. NBC Sports president Ken Schanzer stated regarding its decision not to renew its contract:

We have notified Major League Baseball that we have passed on their offer and we wish them well going forward.

Under the new deal, Fox would now pay an average of $417 million a year, an approximately 45% increase from the previous deal (which was worth $290 million per year) that Fox, NBC and ESPN contributed together. CBS and ABC reportedly were not interested in buying the rights at the prices being offered by Major League Baseball.

When asked about the new deal with Fox, Commissioner Bud Selig said:

We at Major League Baseball could not be happier with the result. They have been a good partner and an innovative producer of our games.

Neal Pilson, who served as the president of CBS Sports when CBS had the exclusive television rights for Major League Baseball said of Fox's $2.5 billion deal:

It is a lot of baseball. It will force Fox to delay the start of its entertainment season every fall in order to cover the playoffs and the World Series, but I am sure they have taken that into account. Fox probably believes it has driven a good deal financially. It has kept its cost escalation at a very modest number. I'm sure Fox believes if it is the only national carrier, it can sell its commercial (slots) without having to face underpricing from a competitor.

Some observers believed that gaining the relative ratings boost from the League Championship Series and World Series meant more to Fox than the other broadcast networks. This was because Fox had suffered the biggest prime time ratings decline among the four major networks during the 1999–2000 television season, with an average prime time audience of 8.97 million viewers, down 17% from the year before, according to Nielsen Media Research.

For the first year of its exclusive six-year contract (2001), Fox did a split telecast (which had not been attempted since the ill-fated "Baseball Network" arrangement existed) for the League Championship Series. This meant that two games were played simultaneously on the same night, with one game airing on the Fox network and the other on the regional Fox Sports Net cable channel (depending on market, as some markets did not have a regional sports network with a relationship to FSN). The rationale behind the split-telecast was that because of the September 11 attacks, the entire post-season schedule was delayed by a week. Because of this, two Sunday LCS games came in conflict with a Fox NFL doubleheader. Fans and sports journalists were unimpressed with the situation and MLB commissioner Bud Selig vowed that it was a one-time deal necessitated by circumstance. However, in later years, Fox used split telecasts on a few occasions to keep the playoffs "on schedule" and maximize its prime time advertising revenue, and aired the second game on FX, which has virtually nationwide distribution on cable and satellite. This ensured that Fox did not have to air an LCS game on a weekday afternoon, when many viewers are unable to watch. The 2007–2013 contract eliminated this issue, as TBS had rights to one of the League Championship Series each year. However, Fox continued to air afternoon LCS games on weekdays through the entire length of the contract.

=== 2007–2013 ===
On July 11, 2006, Major League Baseball announced that the Fox network had signed a new seven-year contract, which guaranteed that Fox would remain the broadcaster of the World Series through the 2013 season. Fox had widely been expected to renew the deal, but it was unclear what Fox would be willing to air beyond the All-Star Game and World Series.

The package was officially announced on October 17, 2006. Under the terms of the arrangement, Fox retained its rights to the network's regular-season package, which would now begin in April, and would remain the exclusive home of the All-Star Game and World Series. Fox's postseason coverage beyond the World Series is limited to one League Championship Series per year (the American League Championship Series in odd numbered years and National League Championship Series in even numbered years), which alternates every year with TBS (which took over exclusive rights to the Division Series from ESPN) airing the other LCS.

One of the terms of the deal was that, beginning with the 2007 season, the Saturday "Game of the Week" coverage was extended over the entire season rather than starting before or after Memorial Day, with most games being aired in the 3:30 to 7:00 p.m. (Eastern Time) time slot, which was reduced to 4:00 to 7:00 after Fox cancelled its in-studio pre-game program for the 2009 season. Exceptions were added in 2010 with a 3:00 to 7:00 afternoon window being used on Saturdays when Fox was scheduled to broadcast a NASCAR Cup Series race in prime time (which would start at 7:30) and a 7:00 to 10:00 window, when Fox is scheduled to broadcast the UEFA Champions League soccer final (which would start at 3:00).

For 2012, Fox revised its schedule; while the 3:30 p.m. Eastern Time start time remained intact, weekly games on certain Saturdays when Fox was to air NASCAR races held at Texas Motor Speedway, Richmond International Raceway and Darlington Raceway start at 12:30 p.m. Eastern Time. Starting with the date of the UEFA Champions League Final until the Saturday before the All-Star Break, all "Game of the Week" telecasts would start at 7:00 p.m. Eastern Time. The Baseball Night in America moniker was used for all MLB on Fox games in that span.

=== 2014–present ===
On September 19, 2012, Sports Business Daily reported that Major League Baseball would agree to separate eight-year television deals with Fox Sports and Turner Sports through the 2021 season. Fox would reportedly pay around $4 billion over eight years (close to $500 million per year), while Turner would pay around $2.8 billion over eight years (more than $300 million per year). Under the new deals, Fox and TBS' coverage would essentially be the same as in the 2007–2013 contract with the exception of Fox and TBS splitting coverage of the Division Series, which TBS has broadcast exclusively dating back to 2007. More importantly, Fox would carry some of the games (such as the Saturday afternoon Game of the Week) on its new general sports channel, Fox Sports 1, which launched on August 17, 2013. Sources also said it was possible that Fox would sell some League Division Series games to MLB Network.

On October 2, 2012, the new deal between Major League Baseball and Fox was officially confirmed; it included the television rights to 12 Saturday afternoon games on Fox (reduced from 26), 40 games on Fox Sports 1, rights to the All-Star Game, two Division Series (two games were sold to MLB Network, the rest would air on Fox Sports 1), one League Championship Series (in which Fox Sports and Turner Sports would each respectively alternate coverage of American League and National League postseason games each year on an odd-even basis, with Games 1 and, if necessary, 6 in 2014 airing on Fox), and the World Series (which would remain on Fox). In addition, all Fox Saturday Baseball games would be made available on MLB Extra Innings and MLB.TV (subject to local blackout restrictions), Fox Sports was awarded TV Everywhere rights for streaming of game telecasts on computers, mobile and tablet devices, rights to a nightly baseball highlights show, Spanish language rights to all games carried on Fox and Fox Cable (Fox Deportes) and rights to a weekly show produced by MLB Productions.

On November 15, 2018, Fox renewed its rights through 2028, maintaining its existing structure but with expanded digital rights, and a promise to begin airing more games on the Fox broadcast network. This will begin with at least two of the first four League Championship Series games and, if necessary, all seventh games in its league from 2020 to 2028, with expanded baseball on Saturday nights, and two Division Series games (previously on MLB Network) on the broadcast network in 2022.

In 2022, the number of Fox network games expanded to 18 broadcast windows as part of the network's contract renewal, with prime time games, branded as Baseball Night in America airing every week beginning with the Saturday of Memorial Day weekend. Most weeks featured two Saturday evening games in regional coverage, although some weeks had a third regional game. As in 2019, some September broadcasts were moved to Thursday to avoid college football conflicts.

=== Special coverage ===
Since its baseball coverage began in 1996, the Fox network has aired five regular season games on days other than Saturday or Thursday. As part of its coverage of Mark McGwire's bid to break Roger Maris's single-season home run record in 1998, Fox aired a Sunday afternoon game between the Cincinnati Reds and St. Louis Cardinals on September 6 and a Tuesday night game between the Chicago Cubs and the Cardinals on September 8 of that year (McGwire hit his record-breaking 62nd home run of the season in the latter game, which earned a 14.5 rating share for Fox, and remains the network's highest-rated regular season Major League Baseball telecast to this day). On April 16, 2004, Fox aired a Friday night game between the New York Yankees and Boston Red Sox to cover those teams' first head-to-head meeting since the memorable 2003 ALCS. On August 12, 2016, Fox aired a Friday night game between the Tampa Bay Rays and New York Yankees, as it was the final game for long-time Yankees player Alex Rodriguez. On Tuesday, March 18, 2025, Fox aired Game 1 of the MLB Japan Series at 6:00 a.m. eastern time. Game 2 of the series aired on Fox Sports 1. Although Fox aired the first game and their broadcasts of MLB games are usually exclusive, MLB allowed the Cubs' Marquee Sports Network and the Dodgers' Spectrum SportsNet LA to produce their own broadcasts in the Chicago and Los Angeles metropolitan areas.

For a Saturday afternoon telecast of a Los Angeles Dodgers/Chicago Cubs game at Wrigley Field on August 26, 2000, Fox aired a special "Turn Back the Clock" broadcast to commemorate the 61st anniversary of the first televised baseball game. The broadcast started with a recreation of the television technology of 1939, with play-by-play announcer Joe Buck working alone with a single microphone, a single black-and-white camera, and no graphics; each subsequent half-inning would then see the broadcast "jump ahead in time" to a later era, showing the evolving technologies and presentation of network baseball coverage through the years.

In the 2020 season, Fox aired Thursday night games through mid and late summer for six weeks and only aired Saturday games for seven weeks from mid-summer to early-fall (due to the delayed start of the season).

=== Other MLB related programming ===
Saturday baseball games broadcast on Fox have regularly been preceded by a youth-targeted baseball-oriented program: Fox aired In the Zone from the inaugural season of MLB rights in 1996 until 1999, and This Week in Baseball from 2000 to 2011 (the latter program had previously aired in syndication from 1977 to 1998). From 2012 to 2013, Fox aired MLB Player Poll, a show in which players and fans talk about current MLB-related topics and participate in opinion polls about the sport/players of baseball; it was hosted by Greg Amsinger.

== Commentators and studio personalities ==
=== Current play-by-play commentators ===
Along with a roster of regular play-by-play commentators, Fox also utilizes fill-in commentators when its regular announcers are on assignment for Fox College Football or NFL on Fox.

- Joe Davis: Lead play-by-play (Baseball Night in America, MLB on FS1, MLB All-Star Game, World Series, League Championship Series, one Division Series)
- Adam Amin: play-by-play (Baseball Night in America, MLB on FS1, one Division Series)
- Kenny Albert: play-by-play (Baseball Night in America, MLB on FS1)
- Kevin Kugler: play-by-play (Baseball Night in America, MLB on FS1)
- Alex Faust: play-by-play (Baseball Night in America, MLB on FS1)
- Connor Onion: play-by-play (MLB on FS1)
- Eric Collins: play-by-play (Baseball Night in America, MLB on FS1)
- Brandon Gaudin: fill-in play-by-play (Baseball Night in America),
- Don Orsillo: fill-in play-by-play (Baseball Night in America)
- Jeff Levering: fill-in play-by-play (Baseball Night in America)
- Cory Provus: fill-in play-by-play (Baseball Night in America)
- Wayne Randazzo: fill-in play-by-play (Baseball Night in America)
- Aaron Goldsmith: fill-in play-by-play (Baseball Night in America),

=== Current color commentators ===
- John Smoltz: Lead color (Baseball Night in America, MLB on FS1, MLB at Field of Dreams, MLB at Rickwood Field, MLB All-Star Game, World Series, League Championship Series, one Division Series)
- A. J. Pierzynski: color (Baseball Night in America, MLB on FS1, MLB London Series, one Division Series)
- Adam Wainwright: color (Baseball Night in America, MLB on FS1, MLB London Series, one Division Series)
- Eric Karros: color (Baseball Night in America, MLB on FS1)
- Tom Verducci: color (Baseball Night in America, MLB on FS1)
- Mark Sweeney: color (Baseball Night in America, MLB on FS1)
- Dontrelle Willis: color (MLB on FS1)

=== Current field reporters ===
- Ken Rosenthal: Lead field reporter (Baseball Night in America, MLB on FS1, MLB at Field of Dreams, MLB at Rickwood Field, MLB All-Star Game, World Series, League Championship Series, one Division Series)
- Tom Verducci: field reporter (MLB at Field of Dreams, MLB All-Star Game, World Series, League Championship Series, one Division Series)
- Tom Rinaldi: field reporter (MLB All-Star Game, select feature reports)

=== Current studio team ===
- Kevin Burkhardt: Lead studio host (Baseball Night in America, MLB on FS1, MLB at Field of Dreams, MLB at Rickwood Field, MLB All-Star Game, World Series, League Championship Series, Division Series)
- Chris Myers: Alternate studio host (Baseball Night in America, MLB on FS1)
- Mike Hill: Alternate studio host (Baseball Night in America, MLB on FS1)
- Matt Vasgersian: Alternate postsesason studio host (World Series, League Championship Series, Division Series)
- Allison Williams: Alternate studio host (Baseball Night in America, MLB on FS1)
- Alex Rodriguez: Studio analyst (MLB at Field of Dreams, MLB at Rickwood Field, MLB All-Star Game, World Series, League Championship Series, Division Series)
- David Ortiz: Studio analyst (MLB at Field of Dreams, MLB at Rickwood Field, MLB All-Star Game, World Series, League Championship Series, Division Series)
- Derek Jeter: Studio analyst (MLB at Field of Dreams, MLB at Rickwood Field, MLB All-Star Game, World Series, League Championship Series, Division Series)
- Dontrelle Willis: Studio analyst (Baseball Night in America, MLB on FS1, Division Series)
- Eric Karros: Studio analyst (Baseball Night in America, MLB on FS1)
- Mark Sweeney: Studio analyst (Baseball Night in America, MLB on FS1)

== Production overview ==
=== Innovations ===
On July 8, 1997, Fox televised its first ever All-Star Game (out of Jacobs Field in Cleveland). For this particular game, Fox introduced "Catcher-Cam" in which a camera was affixed to the catchers' masks in order to provide unique perspectives of the action around home plate.

In October 2004, Fox started airing all Major League Baseball postseason broadcasts (including the League Championship Series and World Series) in high definition; Fox also started airing the Major League Baseball All-Star Game in HD that year. Prior to the 2008 season, one of the three regional games the network televises each Saturday was presented in HD. Since 2008, all MLB games televised by Fox – including Saturday regional games – are presented in high definition.

On September 29, 2010, Fox announced that it planned to use cable-cams for the network's coverage of the National League Championship Series and World Series. According to Fox, the cable-cams can roam over the field at altitudes ranging from about 12 to 80 feet above ground, and would be able to provide overhead shots of, among other things, "close plays" at bases and "managers talking to their pitchers on the mound."

The 2020 season was delayed until July due to the COVID-19 pandemic. Fox soon announced that they would virtually fill the seats of Chicago's Wrigley Field, Los Angeles' Dodger Stadium, Washington's Nationals Park, San Diego's Petco Park and other ballparks that it broadcasts games over the next several weeks. Announcers later spent time explaining and demonstrating the use of virtual fans during the July 25 game between the Chicago Cubs-Milwaukee Brewers at Wrigley Field.

=== Digital on-screen graphics ===
==== 1996–1998 ====
For its first year of coverage in 1996, Fox used the score bug on their Major League Baseball telecasts. Within two years, the bug would be expanded to all sports telecasts on Fox and other networks. The first scoring bug was a translucent parallelogram with red borders on the left and right. The Fox logo and inning were on the left side, with the score on the right side. The count and number of outs were underneath. A diamond would be displayed around the bug only when runners were on base. An occupied base was represented by a red dot.

The bug was slightly modified in 1998. The layout remained the same but it now was a square. The teams and scores also now had a white background, with a red arrow indicating which team was at bat. Occupied bases were now represented by a yellow triangle. Also beginning in 1998, pitch speed began to briefly cover the count and outs area after a pitch was thrown.

==== 1999–2000 ====
In 1999, Fox unveiled a new score bug that was nearly identical to the NFL bug unveiled the previous fall. A permanent baserunner graphic (with a design that would be used through 2008) was on the left side of the bug and occupied bases would light up in yellow. The team scores were on a black background on the right side of the bug. A bar with the Fox logo and the inning (now with a standard up or down arrow to indicate top or bottom of the inning) extended from the top. A bar with the count and the number of outs extended from the bottom.

During the 2000 season, the bug sometimes would move to the lower portion of the screen and flip over to reveal player statistics graphics. However, this feature was not always utilized as player statistics graphics would sometimes simply fade onto the screen with the bug still in place.

==== 2001–2004 ====
For the 2001 season, Fox implemented a new graphics package for its MLB telecasts, which debuted on the network's NASCAR broadcasts in February of that year. The graphics package was an updated version of the design in 1999, but the FoxBox was revised as a horizontal banner positioned across the top of the screen. A simple, transparent black rectangle with a shaded area above it spanned the top of the screen from left to right, displaying the diamond graphic representing the baseball diamond, and the abbreviations of both teams in white. The scores would be shown in black text in yellow boxes next to the team abbreviations; the center showed the inning indicator, to the right was the number of outs, right of that was the pitch count and the pitch speed (the pitch speed was in the same location as the pitch count, and appeared in a yellow box); and the MLB on Fox logo was placed on the far right. The bug, along with the shaded area above it, extended or retracted from the top of the screen whenever it appeared or was removed.

In 2003, the score bug was slightly changed to mirror that used by FSN, although Fox retained its own graphics package; it was enlarged, except on All-Star Game and World Series telecasts as well as the April 16, 2004 Yankees–Red Sox game, and made more translucent. During Fox's coverage of the 2003 World Series and the 2004 All-Star Game, a logo other than the MLB on Fox logo was placed on the far right of the bug instead during non-regular season game broadcasts (e.g. World Series on Fox, All-Star Game on Fox, etc.). In 2004, a scrolling graphic displaying scores of other games in progress was added below the far right side of the score bug.

While Fox Sports upgraded the graphics packages on its other properties, the NFL and NASCAR starting with the 2003 NFL season, baseball telecasts continued to use this on-screen appearance in 2004 (except during its coverage of that year's postseason), but used elements from a new package that debuted with FSN's baseball broadcasts in mid-summer 2003; FSN also used this on-screen look for all of its sports broadcasts from 2001 until mid-2005, but using different graphics packages than the one Fox used.

A graphic from this package was seen during the 15th inning of the 2008 All-Star Game, when Fox displayed highlights from the 1967 MLB All-Star Game, but only seen in the 4:3 frame on the HD broadcast.

==== 2004–2007 ====
Starting with the 2004 postseason, Fox's baseball broadcasts began using the same graphics package that debuted with NFL telecasts in 2003. The score bug continued to use the layout from the 2001 version, except team abbreviations were shown this time in electronic eggcrate lettering in the team's main color; and the scores were shown in white text in black parallelograms. Beginning with this graphics package and continuing into the present, the FoxBox now displays a home run being hit.

During the 2005 World Series, a new white bug was introduced, which resembled a chrome finish; and team abbreviations became white letters in parallelograms colored in the teams' respective primary colors (scores were now shown in black text in white parallelograms); the next few years, the new bug was adopted for all games.

In 2006, Fox introduced another new graphics package for its NFL and college football coverage beginning with the 2006 NFL season, and was subsequently rolled out to NASCAR for the 2007 Daytona 500. However, MLB broadcasts continued using this on-screen appearance in 2007. This score bug was also used in the July 12, 2008 game between the Colorado Rockies and the New York Mets until the 9th inning, but with the 2008 graphics package instead of the package that was used with this bug.

==== 2008 ====
For the 2008 season, Fox's baseball coverage used the same graphics package adopted for its NFL telecasts in 2006. The diamond graphic was placed to the right of the scores, and slimmed down to only consist of the main three bases (unlike other implementations which included home plate); the MLB on Fox logo was moved to the far left side. The colored strip across the top of the banner was rendered in blue at all times (instead of being in the colors of the active team). Team abbreviations were no longer in their respective primary colors; and the shaded area above did not contain the animated stripe pattern. The stripe pattern only appeared within the player stats graphic.

==== 2009–2010 ====
For the 2009 and 2010 seasons, telecasts used the same graphics package implemented by FSN, with the FoxBox now reverting to a compact rectangular box in the top-left corner of the 4:3 safe area. Along with FSN in observance of the holiday weekend, the baserunner graphic was changed to a blue pattern with stars during the Fourth of July weekend and All-Star Game in 2010. Also in July 2010, broadcasts began to be produced in full 16:9 widescreen and letterboxed for standard definition viewers through the use of the #10 Active Format Description code (which is primarily used for Fox broadcasts transmitted to pay television providers via its stations). The score bug was moved to be in the top-left corner of the widescreen feed.

==== 2011—2013 ====
Starting with Opening Day of the 2011 MLB season, both the Fox broadcast network and Fox Sports Networks began using the same graphics package adopted for NFL on Fox telecasts in 2010, featuring an unconventional horizontal layout for the score bug. It initially had team abbreviations (as opposed to the use of team logos on the NFL version) and scores flanking a display of the inning, diamond, count, outs (represented by 3 lights), and pitch speed in the center. The new bug was also able to slide open to reveal statistical information or home run notifications. For the 2012 MLB season, the score bug was modified to use cap insignias instead of team abbreviations, and outs were now represented by only two lamps.

During the 2012 NLCS, the score bug was modified again to match the new layout adopted by Fox's NFL coverage at the start of the 2012 season; teams and scores reverted to being vertically stacked on the left, the base graphic moved to the right-hand side, pitch speed is displayed below the base graphic (which now displays the pitch count below the diamond after 40 pitches as well), while the count, outs, and inning number moved to a tab below the box. This graphic was also not removed for the final out of the World Series. In late-March 2013, the Fox Sports Networks began using this version in time for the start of the 2013 MLB season (the previous score bug was used for 2013 Spring training games).

==== 2014–2017 ====
For the 2014 season, Fox's MLB coverage debuted a new graphics package first seen on its NASCAR broadcasts that year. Notably, the score bug was moved to the bottom-left corner of the screen. The bug places the team abbreviations and scores on the left side over the team's background color. On the top of the right side is the inning (which is the only component in yellow text) and the base graphic; the lower right contains the count and outs (represented by two dots). Above the main box is a new "dynamic" strip, which by default shows the last name of the current pitcher along with the number of pitches he has thrown. However, this strip can be expanded and change color to display team-specific information, such as on-deck hitters and pitchers warming up in the bullpen.

In June 2015, this was also expanded to include a white area featuring the last name of the current batter and their performance throughout the game (or their average for their first time at-bat). When a home run is hit, the main box turns to the team's color and displays the text "Home Run", while the dynamic strip grows and displays the name of the team over the team's logo. Other times (usually on FSN), the dynamic strip displays the name of the player who hit that home run and the main box displays the type of home run and how many home runs that player has hit during the season. The graphics package itself is similar to the previous design, though these graphics are more in the shape of a square, with a typeface that is less athletic in style than the previous Fox graphic packages.

Starting with the 2016 season, the score bug was moved to the bottom right, and has remained there since.

==== 2017–2021 ====
For the 2017 postseason, Fox's MLB coverage unveiled a new graphics package first seen on its NFL telecasts, though the same layout from the 2014 version for the scoring bug continued to be used, with the addition of two statistical panes atop the scoring bug for batter/pitcher matchups, game at-bat results, and individual statistics. Also, the inning indicator, the ball-strike counter and the out counter (which is now back to being numerically represented) were all moved to the bottom of the scoring bug.

In 2020, Fox unveiled a new graphics package for its NFL and college football coverage starting with Super Bowl LIV. Baseball broadcasts continued using this package through the end of the 2021 regular season, as the new on-screen look is for football only. Beginning with the 2021 season, Fox and FS1 started using stylized "graphic novel" illustrations on players rather than traditional photos, similar to those used on the network's NFL coverage since the previous year's Super Bowl and later used by NASCAR Cup Series coverage starting in 2022. In the same season, Fox debuted a retro-inspired graphics package designed for broadcasts for the annual Field of Dreams game, using classic team logos and old-looking scoreboard-based animations for the score bug.

==== 2021–2026 ====
In October 2021, Fox unveiled a new graphics package specifically for its baseball broadcasts, starting with the 2021 ALDS. This new score bug, which increased in size, featured an unconventional layout (also used in 2011 and 2012), with the team abbreviations over the scores; the inning, ball-strike counter and the out counter sandwiched in between them; and the bases information at the bottom. The two panes atop the score bug for batter/pitcher matchups, game at bat results and individual statistics; were retained in this design. In the 2024 season, Fox debuted a re-tooled version of the retro-inspired graphics package, designed for the broadcast of the Rickwood Field game; it was based on the design of the scoreboard in the Negro Leagues.

On August 2 and 3, 2025, Fox used some elements from NASCAR on Fox during MLB Speedway Classic at Bristol Motor Speedway in which the Atlanta Braves defeated the Cincinnati Reds 4-2.

For the 2026 season, the score bug began to display the number of Automated Ball-Strike System challenges for each team.

==== 2026-present ====
During the 2026 NLCS, Fox introduced another new graphics package and score bug for its baseball broadcasts. The layout is the same as the as the previous version, but now with small cap insignias at the bottom outer corners. The challenges are now displayed horizontally in yellow underneath each team's score. It’s similar to NASCAR on FOX graphics.

== Theme music ==
NJJ Music composed the original MLB on Fox theme music in 1996. This theme music was used exclusively from June 1996 until early May 2007. In mid-May 2007, an updated version was unveiled, featuring a more jazzy feel and implementing a full orchestra instead of the synth elements used by the 1996 theme; this version was composed by Pete Calandra. For the 2007 postseason, a slow orchestral piece composed by Jochen Flach was unveiled, and was used alongside the new main theme for the All-Star Game and postseason from the 2007 ALCS until the 2010 All-Star Game. Fox Saturday Baseball, including the prime time games starting in 2010, still used the regular theme song exclusively.

During the 2009 season, some Fox Sports regional affiliates switched to the 2007 theme while others continued using the original 1996 theme. However, all regional affiliates began using the 2007 theme starting with the 2011 season.

Beginning with the 2010 postseason, both the 2007 theme and the Flach theme were replaced by the longtime NFL on Fox theme music, which began to be used for all Fox Sports properties. However, starting in 2011 and continuing to today, various songs from the album Heroes: The Olympic Collection were used when going into commercial breaks during the All-Star Game, postseason, and other marquee games such as Red Sox-Yankees games.

In 2014, the 2007–2010 jazz theme was brought back for regular season games on MLB on FS1. The NFL theme was retained for MLB on Fox, including Fox Saturday Baseball, Baseball Night in America, the All-Star Game and all coverage of the postseason. However, occasionally one of the two themes was heard on telecasts that were designated for the other, implying that the designations are slightly fluid.

In 2020, MLB on Fox reintroduced the original 1996–2007 theme; Fox Sports regional affiliates continued to use the 2007–2010 theme until the network was rebranded to Bally Sports in 2021. As of the 2021 season, the original theme is now used for coverage of all games across both Fox and FS1.

== Criticism ==
=== Scheduling ===
Fox Sports has received criticism from sports fans for perceived bias toward teams in the American League in Major League Baseball (especially the Boston Red Sox and New York Yankees). Fox rarely shows teams from outside the top-10 media markets during the regular season.

=== Commentators ===
==== In-game commentators ====
In 2007, Joe Buck was only scheduled to call eight regular season MLB games out of a 26-game schedule for Fox (along with a handful of regional St. Louis Cardinals telecasts on FSN Midwest). In an interview with Richard Sandomir of The New York Times, Buck defended his reduced baseball commitment:

If you or the casual fan doesn't want to consider me the No. 1 baseball announcer at Fox, it's not my concern ... I don't know why it would matter. I don't know who had a more tiresome, wall-to-wall schedule than my father, and I know what it's like to be a kid in that situation ... He was gone a lot. He needed to be. I understood it. So did my mom. Because my career has gone the way it's gone, I don't have to go wall to wall. ...While I'm deathly afraid of overexposure, I'm more afraid of underexposure at home with my wife and girls.

In 2008, Buck drew criticism for comments he made during an appearance on ESPN Radio's The Herd with Colin Cowherd, in which he admitted to spending "barely any" time following sporting events he does not broadcast, and facetiously claimed that he preferred watching The Bachelorette instead.

In general, Fox's initial lead broadcast team of Joe Buck and Tim McCarver had been heavily scrutinized, much less criticized over time. During the 2012 National League Championship Series between the San Francisco Giants and St. Louis Cardinals, Buck and McCarver were accused by the San Francisco media in particular, of being too biased towards the Cardinals.

==== Color commentators ====
In Game 4 of the 1997 American League Championship Series, on a wild pitch with runners dashing around the bases, when umpire Durwood Merrill gestured to where the ball was, color commentator Tim McCarver sarcastically commented that "maybe he was trying to tell himself where the ball is!" Merrill heard about that, took offense to it, and fired back in his autobiography that he was letting the other umpires know that the situation was under control. Meanwhile, when rule questions come up during a broadcast, McCarver frequently would explain the rule, sometimes incorrectly. For example, after a St. Louis Cardinals balk in Game 4 of the 2006 NLCS, McCarver explained, "You have to have 'one thousand one' when coming to a stop, and you have to stop your glove in the same place every time in front of your body", when the rules state that there must be merely a complete discernible stop anywhere in front of the pitcher's body; no certain duration or location is necessary.

McCarver was also known to make verbal gaffes, particularly with player's names (notably confusing Albert Pujols with the retired Luis Pujols, as well as repeatedly referring to Bronson Arroyo as "Brandon Arroyo" during the 2004 World Series). During the 2009 World Series, he referred to New York Yankees shortstop Derek Jeter as "Jerek Deter". In 2006, an episode of the Fox animated series Family Guy lampooned McCarver's broadcasting ability with the quip, "Well, at least he couldn't be any worse than Tim McCarver is at sportscasting." McCarver has in general, been accused of overanalyzing situations, being too verbose, and not allowing a game to "breathe".

During their broadcast of Game 3 of the 2006 American League Championship Series, Lou Piniella, who is of Spanish descent, made an analogy involving the luck of finding a wallet, and then briefly used a couple of Spanish phrases. Fox color commentator Steve Lyons responded by saying that Piniella was "hablaing Español" – Spanglish for "speaking Spanish" – and added, "I still can't find my wallet. I don't understand him, and I don't want to sit close to him now." On October 13, 2006, Fox fired Lyons for making these remarks, which the network determined to be racially insensitive. Lyons was replaced for the rest of the series in Detroit by Los Angeles Angels announcer José Mota. Piniella later stated that he thought that Lyons was just "kidding" and that Lyons was, per Piniella's experience, not bigoted. Lyons had previously maligned Los Angeles Dodgers outfielder Shawn Green, who is Jewish, for sitting out a game on Yom Kippur in 2004, saying "He's not even a practicing Jew. He didn't marry a Jewish girl. And from what I understand, he never had a bar mitzvah, which is unfortunate because he doesn't get the money." Lyons was suspended briefly without pay after his remarks, and Fox apologized for Lyons' comments, though Lyons never made an on-air apology.

On July 24, 2012, Matt Yoder of Awful Announcing questioned Fox's need to hire local broadcasters on their national telecasts and therefore, bringing about a perceived sense of favoritism towards one of the participating teams. For example, Billy Ripken, who played for the Baltimore Orioles alongside his Hall of Fame brother Cal, was roundly criticized for his perceived favoritism towards the Orioles while broadcasting an Orioles–Detroit Tigers game for Fox the previous week. The following week came a Philadelphia Phillies–San Francisco Giants telecast on Fox, which was called by Phillies play-by-play announcer Tom McCarthy and former Phillies pitcher Mitch Williams. McCarthy and Williams were in particular, singled out for their rather downbeat manner of calling a Matt Cain home run off Cole Hamels in the top of the 3rd inning. This was contrasted by their more enthusiastic call of Hamels returning the favor with a home run in the bottom half of the inning. In 2019, Len Kasper, then the voice of the Cubs, broadcast a Cubs-Nationals on Fox with a rather monotonous tone of voice while calling Nationals home runs.

Since along with Tom Verducci, succeeding Tim McCarver as Fox's lead color commentator in 2014, Harold Reynolds has been accused contributing to little more superficial, surface-level comments on telecasts. For example, during Game 5 the 2015 American League Championship Series, when Toronto's Chris Colabello hit a solo homer in the second inning, Reynolds' simple contribution was, "Well, I guess he made an adjustment." More to the point, immediately after, Verducci jumped in and explained how that was the first home run that Kansas City starter Edinson Vólquez had allowed in his past 1,228 changeups. Reynolds' response was "How do you know that? Unbelievable, Tom. You were sitting on that one, weren't you?"

During the 2018 World Series, John Smoltz was heavily criticized for appearing to hate the direction baseball was going in. Two years later, Smoltz throughout the National League Division Series, National League Championship Series, and World Series, appeared to spend the bulk of Fox's MLB broadcasts complaining about shifts to pitcher usage to the catch-all of "analytics".

==== Hosts and field reporters ====
While covering the 2005 Major League Baseball All-Star Game at Comerica Park in Detroit, host Jeanne Zelasko angered many fans for her treatment of legendary broadcaster Ernie Harwell. Many disliked the way Zelasko abruptly – and in many fans' eyes, awkwardly – cut Harwell off just 17 seconds into a pre-game interview, as Harwell was detailing the accomplishments of famous Tiger Al Kaline. Harwell later said he was not offended by Zelasko, and let the matter drop. In September 2008, Zelasko took heat for referring to the Tampa Bay Rays as the "Tampa Rays". Jeanne Zelasko has, in general, been accused of being too flippant, not particularly knowledgeable about the sport of baseball, and inserting too many corny clichés or plays on words during broadcasts.

Chris Rose has been criticized for appearing to be too chummy with players that he has interviewed during Fox's baseball coverage. For example, during the 2009 World Series, Rose referred to Derek Jeter of the New York Yankees as "Jeets". One year later during the World Series, Rose referred to both Brian Wilson and Tim Lincecum of the San Francisco Giants as "his friends".

Field reporter Erin Andrews' performance has been criticized since she joined Fox Sports' MLB coverage in 2012. For example, Andrews during trophy presentations, has been accused of showing an extreme lack of knowledge by reading off notes. More to the point, during the trophy presentation at the end of the 2013 American League Championship Series, Andrews misidentified former Anaheim Angels owner and honorary American League president Jackie Autry as her late husband Gene. Andrews was further criticized during the trophy presentations for the 2014 World Series due to her very generic questions that for the most part, lacked insight.

=== Production ===
Scooter debuted in the 2004 baseball season on April 16, during a game between the New York Yankees and Boston Red Sox. While Fox Sports television chairman David Hill called Scooter "really cute and really terrific", the character has garnered few positive reactions otherwise, with Sports Illustrated writer John Donovan warning "purists everywhere, grab the barf bag," and Sports Illustrated media writer Richard Deitsch using Scooter as an example of "how technology does not always help society." The Sporting News reported polling their staff with the question "What best summarizes your feelings for Scooter, Fox's talking baseball?": 45% of responders chose the answer "Send him to a slow, painful death." Despite most reactions, Scooter would still be used in televised baseball games until after the 2006 World Series.

During Fox's coverage of the 2005 Major League Baseball All-Star Game from Detroit, cameras at the start of bottom half of the third inning, tightly focused on a Chevy sponsored banner that read "HHRYA.com". Fox was soon accused of attempting to mislead viewers into believing that the banner was merely the work of a random fan in the stands at Comerica Park.

From the 2010 MLB playoffs until the 2019 MLB playoffs, Fox used its NFL theme music for its MLB coverage (and all other Fox Sports properties, including NASCAR and UFC events). There has been backlash from fans who believe that the NFL theme does not belong on MLB coverage, and that the previous MLB theme should return. A poll by Sports Media Watch noted that as of October 23, 2010, while nearly 60% of fans thought that Fox made a bad move, only 11% thought it was a good move and 30% had no opinion (all percentages rounded). However, beginning with the 2020 MLB season, MLB on Fox reintroduced the original 1996-2007 theme.

During the 2012 National League Championship Series, Fox's camera angles were criticized for being directly in-line with home plate, thus often ensuring that a pitcher's head blocked the view. Fox's camera angles were again criticized (this time in an elevated and more dead center camera angle) during FS1's coverage of Game 1 of the 2016 National League Division Series between the Chicago Cubs and San Francisco Giants.

During the bottom of the 9th in Game 4 of the 2013 World Series between the Boston Red Sox and St. Louis Cardinals, Fox's cameras missed Boston closer Koji Uehara picking off pinch runner Kolten Wong to end the game (it was the first postseason game in baseball history to end on a pickoff).

For Fox's broadcast of Game 4 of the 2019 American League Division Series between the Houston Astros and Tampa Bay Rays on FS1, they opened up the broadcast with an off-center camera angle, which is basically a view from the shortstop. This immediately drew a lot of complaints on Twitter from viewers, who were used to seeing the center field camera angle for Rays' home games, and wanted a better look at the pitch movement and location from Houston's Justin Verlander and Tampa Bay's Diego Castillo. FS1 changed to the center field camera angle in the bottom of the third.

During a nationally broadcast game between the Chicago White Sox and Cincinnati Reds in September 2020, Fox mistakenly showed Pittsburgh's skyline while broadcasting the Major League Baseball game from Cincinnati.

During a nationally broadcast game between the Boston Red Sox and New York Yankees in July 2022, an aerial shot of the September 11 Memorial garnered criticism due to the memorial pools having team logos superimposed over the footprints of the original World Trade Center towers.

During the top of the 9th inning of Game 7 of the 2025 American League Championship Series between the Toronto Blue Jays and Seattle Mariners and with two outs left in the inning, Fox broke away to air a 15-second long Capital One advertisement. This move was immediately cited by critics as being both inexplicable and unacceptable.

== Other baseball coverage ==
Along with their MLB coverage, Fox Sports's baseball coverage also includes the World Baseball Classic, the Congressional Baseball Game, and college softball and baseball from the Big East and Big Ten Conferences. In 2019, Fox Sports also aired the Triple-A National Championship Game. In 2024, Fox Deportes aired the Choque de Gigantes club baseball tournament in Spanish.

== Nielsen ratings ==
=== Fox's regular season averages ===
- 2026: 2.35M
- 2025: 2.04M
- 2024: 1.88M
- 2023: 1.88M
- 2022: 2.11M
- 2021: 2.36M
- 2020: 1.67M
- 2019: 2.4M
- 2018: 2.23M
- 2017: 2.05M
- 2016: 2.09M
- 2015: 2.2M
- 2014: 1.9M
- 2013: 2.4M
- 2012: 2.5M
- 2011: 2.74M
- 2010: 2.7M
- 2009: 2.7M
- 2008: 2.8M
- 2007: 3.3M
- 2006: 3.35M
- 2005: 3.61M
- 2004: 3.73M
- 2003: 3.6M
- 2002: 3.45M
- 2001: 3.38M

=== Fox's World Series averages ===
- 2024: 15.81M
- 2023: 9.08M
- 2022: 11.76M
- 2021: 11.74M
- 2020: 9.79M
- 2019: 13.91M
- 2018: 14.13M
- 2017: 18.93M
- 2016: 22.85M
- 2015: 14.53M
- 2014: 13.93M
- 2013: 14.98M
- 2012: 12.64M
- 2011: 16.52M
- 2010: 14.22M
- 2009: 19.33M
- 2008: 13.19M
- 2007: 17.12M
- 2006: 15.81M
- 2005: 17.16M
- 2004: 25.39M
- 2003: 20.14M
- 2002: 19.26M
- 2001: 24.53M
- 2000: 18.08M
- 1998: 20.34M
- 1996: 25.22M

Records
Preceded by The Baseball Network (ABC and NBC)	Major League Baseball network broadcast partner 1996–present with NBC (1996–2000 and 2026–present) with ABC (2020–present)	Succeeded by Incumbent
