= MLB's 20 Greatest Games =

- Genre: Major League Baseball
- Presented by: Bob Costas; Tom Verducci
- Country of origin: United States
- Original language: English
- No. of seasons: 1
- No. of episodes: 20

Production
- Executive producers: Mark Ciafa; Bruce Cornblatt; Chris Pfeiffer
- Producer: Jed Tuminaro
- Production location: Secaucus, New Jersey
- Editors: Ryan Dever; Art Guglielmo
- Camera setup: Multi-camera
- Running time: 90 minutes

Original release
- Network: MLB Network
- Release: January 3 – May 22, 2011

MLB's 20 Greatest Games is an American television series that aired in 2011 on MLB Network. Hosted by Bob Costas and Tom Verducci, the series counted down and dissected the 20 greatest games in Major League Baseball history since 1961. The selections were determined by an expert panel of sports journalists and media personalities and votes from MLB Network viewers via MLB Network's official website and MLB.com.

== Format ==
Each episode has hosts Costas and Verducci sitting down with the players or managers involved in either the game that was the focus of the episode, or the memorable moment from the game, while watching the original television broadcast of the game, providing their own input into the games and the moments, as well as how their careers and lives were changed by the game.

== Episodes ==
Game	Ranking	Airdate	Guests
May 17, 1979 - Philadelphia Phillies vs. Chicago Cubs	#20	January 3, 2011	Larry Bowa
2003 National League Division Series Game 4 - San Francisco Giants vs. Florida Marlins	#19	January 10, 2011	None
1980 National League Championship Series Game 5 - Philadelphia Phillies vs. Houston Astros	#18	January 17, 2011	Larry Bowa
2004 American League Championship Series Game 4 - New York Yankees vs. Boston Red Sox	#17	January 24, 2011	Kevin Millar
2009 American League Central Tiebreaker - Detroit Tigers vs. Minnesota Twins	#16	January 31, 2011	Michael Cuddyer
1995 American League Division Series Game 5 - New York Yankees vs. Seattle Mariners	#15	February 7, 2011	Lou Piniella and David Cone
1993 World Series Game 6 - Philadelphia Phillies vs. Toronto Blue Jays	#14	February 14, 2011	Joe Carter and Mitch Williams
1997 World Series Game 7 - Cleveland Indians vs. Florida Marlins	#13	February 21, 2011	Al Leiter
2001 World Series Game 4 - Arizona Diamondbacks vs. New York Yankees	#12	February 28, 2011	Joe Torre and Tim McCarver
1978 American League East Tiebreaker - New York Yankees vs. Boston Red Sox	#11	March 7, 2011	Bucky Dent and Lou Piniella
1988 World Series Game 1 - Oakland Athletics vs. Los Angeles	#10	March 14, 2011	Kirk Gibson and Dave Stewart
2001 World Series Game 7 - New York Yankees vs. Arizona Diamondbacks	#9	March 21, 2011	Joe Torre and Tim McCarver
1986 American League Championship Series Game 5 - Boston Red Sox vs. California Angels	#8	March 28, 2011	Bobby Grich, Dave Henderson, and Bruce Hurst
2003 National League Championship Series Game 6 - Florida Marlins vs. Chicago Cubs	#7	April 3, 2011	Jack McKeon, Mike Lowell, and Alex S. Gonzalez
2003 American League Championship Series Game 7 - Boston Red Sox vs. New York Yankees	#6	April 10, 2011	Aaron Boone, Pedro Martinez, and Bernie Williams
1986 National League Championship Series Game 6 - New York Mets vs. Houston Astros	#5	April 17, 2011	Darryl Strawberry, Jesse Orosco, and Bob Knepper
1992 National League Championship Series Game 7 - Pittsburgh Pirates vs. Atlanta Braves	#4	April 24, 2011	Andy Van Slyke, Sid Bream, and Mark Lemke
1986 World Series Game 6 - Boston Red Sox vs. New York Mets	#3	May 1, 2011	Bill Buckner, Mookie Wilson, and Bob Ojeda
1991 World Series Game 7 - Atlanta Braves vs. Minnesota Twins	#2	May 8, 2011	John Smoltz and Jack Morris
1975 World Series Game 6 - Cincinnati Reds vs. Boston Red Sox	#1	May 22, 2011	Johnny Bench and Fred Lynn. Also: Pete Rose, Bernie Carbo, Dwight Evans, Pat Darcy, and Denny Doyle

Although not officially a part of the series, MLB Network, with Bob Costas and Tom Verducci moderating, would later run specials on Game 7 of the 2016 World Series (with managers Joe Maddon and Terry Francona as special guest) and Game 7 of the 2025 World Series.
