= Thursday Night Baseball =

US television program

- Logo
- Also known as: USA Network Thursday Night Baseball; ABC's Thursday Night Baseball; ESPN Thursday Night Baseball; Baseball Night in America
- Genre: Sport
- Developed by: USA Sports; ABC Sports; Fox Sports; ESPN
- Starring: John Smoltz; Ken Rosenthal; Kevin Burkhardt; Adam Amin; Joe Davis; A. J. Pierzynski; Eric Karros
- Theme music composer: NJJ Music; Scott Schreer
- Country of origin: United States
- Original language: English

Production
- Camera setup: Multi-camera
- Running time: 210 minutes or until game ends (inc. adverts)

Original release
- Network: USA Network; ABC; Fox Sports Net; Fox Family; ESPN/ESPN2

USA Network was the first network to consistently air Major League Baseball games on Thursday night with USA Network Thursday Night Baseball from 1979 to 1983. Thursday night baseball games returned in 1989 with the move of ABC's games in the networks' final season of coverage until 2020.

ESPN has aired games on Thursday nights since 2003. ESPN aired weekly Thursday Night games from 2003 to 2006 and has aired a limited number of games, including an exclusive Opening Day game since 2017, after 2006.

Fox Sports has aired games on Thursday nights in two different iterations. First from 1997 to 2001 on Fox Sports Network and Fox Family, and since 2014 on Fox Sports 1 and Fox. Fox has aired a limited number of Baseball Night in America games on Thursday nights since 2019.

== History ==
=== USA Network Thursday Night Baseball (1979–1983) ===
From 1979 to 1983, the USA Network broadcast Major League Baseball games on Thursday nights.

The series began April 26, 1979 with a doubleheader: Cleveland at Kansas City (Jim Woods/Bud Harrelson) followed by Baltimore at California (Monte Moore/Maury Wills). The second game of the night was typically, based out of the West Coast. The games were usually blacked out of the competing teams' cities. Once in a while, when USA did a repeat of the telecast late at night, local cities were allowed to show the rerun.

From 1980 to 1981, Woods and Nelson Briles (replacing Harrelson) did the early games (except for a game at Montreal on October 2, 1980, which reunited Woods with onetime Boston Red Sox radio partner Ned Martin), while Moore and Wes Parker (replacing Wills) called the late game.

In 1982, doubleheaders did not start until June 17. Prior to the doubleheaders starting, Moore and Parker did the individual game until then. When the doubleheaders finally began, Moore and Parker moved over to the late game for the rest of the year. Meanwhile, Eddie Doucette (replacing Jim Woods) and Nelson Briles were assigned to call the early game.

USA continued with the plan of not starting doubleheaders until June in the final year of the package in 1983. Steve Zabriskie and Al Albert filled in for Eddie Doucette in September 1982 (Steve Grad also occasionally substituted) while Albert replaced Doucette for a game or more in 1983.

=== ABC's Thursday Night Baseball (1989) ===
In 1989, the ABC network aired Thursday night Major League Baseball games after having broadcast Monday Night Baseball (and occasional Sunday afternoon games) since 1976. This was ABC's final year of consecutive baseball coverage (alongside NBC, which had telecast Saturday afternoon games since 1966 and Major League Baseball in general since 1947) due to CBS signing a four-year contract (spanning from 1990 to 1993) to become the exclusive national broadcast network provider for Major League Baseball games.

Al Michaels, Jim Palmer, and Tim McCarver formed ABC's lead broadcast team ("A Game"), while Gary Thorne and Joe Morgan were the second team ("B Game"). WABC7-New York showed all "A Game" telecasts, except for June 22. KABC7-Los Angeles showed all "A Game" telecasts, except for July 13 & 20. KGO7-Bay Area showed all "A Game" telecasts, except for both June 22 and July 6 (both featured the Athletics). KTRK13-Houston showed all "A Game" telecasts, except for June 29. All other ABC Owned Television Stations televised all "A Game" telecasts. The "B Game" for, July 27, was only seen on ABC affiliates in both Kansas City, Missouri and all of Massachusetts.

Telecast	"A Game"		"B Game"	
June 22	Orioles	Angels	Yankees	Athletics
June 29	Cubs	Giants	Astros	Expos
July 6	Reds	Mets	Royals	Athletics
July 13	Royals	Yankees	Cardinals	Dodgers
July 20	Giants	Cubs	Tigers	Angels
July 27	Orioles	Twins	Royals	Red Sox

=== Fox Sports Net and Fox Family's coverage (1997–2001) ===
In 1997, as part of the contract with Major League Baseball it had signed the year before, Fox Sports gained an additional outlet for its coverage. Its recently launched network of cable regional sports networks, Fox Sports Net, was given rights to two Thursday night games per week, one for the Eastern and Central time zones and one for the Mountain and Pacific time zones.

In 2000, as part of an exclusive contract Fox signed with MLB, that coverage passed to Fox Family Channel and was reduced to one game per week. After the 2000 season, Fox also gained rights to the entire postseason and moved a large portion of its Division Series coverage to Fox Family. This lasted for one season due to The Walt Disney Company acquiring Fox Family. As part of the transaction, Fox Family was renamed ABC Family and ESPN gained the rights to Fox Family and FX's MLB coverage, although the 2002 Division Series aired on ABC Family due to contractual issues, but with ESPN production, a sign of things to come at ABC Sports. Control of the overall contract remained with Fox, meaning they could renegotiate following the 2006 season and not allow ESPN to retain its postseason coverage. For the 2007 season, Fox did exactly that, and TBS became the other home of the postseason as part of its new baseball contract.

Play-by-play announcers for the FSN/Fox Family coverage included Kenny Albert, Thom Brennaman, Chip Caray, Josh Lewin, and Steve Physioc. Color analysts included Bob Brenly, Kevin Kennedy, Steve Lyons, and Jeff Torborg. Occasionally, FSN would simulcast a local-team feed of a game from one of its affiliated RSNs in lieu of a dedicated national production.

=== ESPN Thursday Night Baseball (2003–2006; 2026–present) ===
ESPN Thursday Night Baseball aired on either ESPN or ESPN2 from 2003 to 2006 and featured one game per week, taking over the package that had been on Fox Family Channel. Castrol served as the presenting sponsor for the telecasts.

The play-by-play commentator was Chris Berman along with either Joe Morgan or Eric Karros as color commentator. In 2006, Duke Castiglione joined the broadcast as the field reporter.

ESPN Thursday Night Baseball ended after the 2006 season because the broadcast rights to the package were lost to TBS. TBS began a package of Sunday afternoon games as a replacement for ESPN's Thursday night games. That package was moved to Tuesday nights in 2022.

Even though Thursday Night Baseball as a distinct package ended after the 2006 season, ESPN has still aired select games on Thursday nights, most notably every year since 2017, when Opening Day of the MLB season was moved to Thursdays, an evening game on Opening Day remained part of ESPN's baseball contract.

Following the 2025 season, ESPN and MLB mutually opted-out of their existing contract for Sunday Night Baseball (which moved to NBC). As part of a restructured deal running through 2028, ESPN returned to broadcasting weeknight games, with 30 regular-season games. The schedule for 2026 includes 6 Thursday night games, alongside 10 games each on Monday and Wednesday.

=== Baseball Night in America (2019–present) ===
For the 2019 season, Fox Sports announced that they would air games on two Thursday nights in September. These games were branded as part of Fox's Baseball Night in America package. Four Thursday night games were aired on Fox in a regionalized form, with two each week. The primary games were called by Joe Davis, John Smoltz, and Ken Rosenthal, while the secondary games were called by Kenny Albert, A. J. Pierzynski, and Jon Morosi in 2019.

With the 2020 season being abbreviated to just 60 games due to the COVID-19 pandemic, Fox announced that they would broadcast at least four games on Thursday nights beginning on July 30 and continuing through the month of August. Fox aired three weeks of Thursday night games in 2020, with July 30 and August 6 being regionalized, while August 13 was broadcast to the whole country. Fox was supposed to air another week of regional games on August 27 (at a special time of 6:35pm ET/3:35pm PT), but they were postponed in the wake of player protest after the police shooting of Jacob Blake in Kenosha, Wisconsin, and instead those games got rescheduled to Saturday.

For the 2021 season, Fox only aired one Thursday night game. The "Field of Dreams Game" between the New York Yankees and the Chicago White Sox.

Fox returned to regionalized games in the 2022 season. Fox aired three weeks of Thursday night games, including the second Field of Dreams game on August 11. Fox again also aired two weeks of Thursday night games in September in order to allow more Saturday primetime College Football games to air on the network.

Since the 2023 season, Fox has aired at least three weeks of Thursday night games. At least one game is aired in late August and two games are broadcast in September. In 2024, Fox also aired the MLB at Rickwood Field game on a Thursday night in June.
