= TuneSat =

TuneSat is an online audio recognition service launched in 2009 which enables music copyright holders to detect where their work is being used. Rights owners upload their audio files, and TuneSat begins to search and track results of matches.

Founders Chris Woods and Scott Schreer began by pitching their services to US television networks as an alternative to the cue sheet tracking which has been standard for many years from ASCAP and BMI . In 2012, TuneSat launched a product to detect unlicensed streaming across the web, in podcasts, movie trailers, fan videos, and flash websites. In the spring of 2013, TuneSat raised $1.223 million in equity funding to expand their tracking to more television networks around the world. At the time, TuneSat tracked 320 television networks in 14 countries, including the United States, United Kingdom, Germany, France, Spain and Italy.
