= The Yankee Years =

Book by Joe Torre

- Author: Tom Verducci and Joe Torre
- Language: English
- Genre: Sports
- Publisher: Doubleday
- Publication date: February 3, 2009
- Publication place: United States
- Media type: Print
- Pages: 512 pp (hardcover)
- ISBN: 978-0-385-52740-8

The Yankee Years is a book written by Tom Verducci and Joe Torre. The book chronicles Torre's years as manager of Major League Baseball's New York Yankees from 1996 to 2007. It goes into great detail on Torre's relationship with the players, general manager Brian Cashman, team owner George Steinbrenner, and the Yankees organization as a whole. Also discussed are major developments in the way baseball management throughout the years changed from a batting average focused market to the in-depth statistical-based approach centered on base-percentage, as well as covering issues such as the "Steroids Era".

Torre has received criticism for revealing certain things that went on in the clubhouse after he emphasized loyalty between Yankee personnel. In the book, Torre said he felt that Cashman "betrayed" him in negotiations with the Yankees following the 2007 season. Torre also stated that teammates had referred to Alex Rodriguez as "A-Fraud."

In response to the criticism, Torre said he was proud of the book and he did not violate the sanctity of the clubhouse.

| Preceded by Outliers by Malcolm Gladwell | #1 New York Times Best Seller Non-Fiction; February 25, 2009 - April 11, 2009 | Succeeded by Liberty and Tyranny: A Conservative Manifesto by Mark Levin. |
