= Choque de Gigantes =

Tournament details
- Country: United States
- Venue: 1 (in 1 host city)
- Dates: November 8 – 10, 2024
- Teams: 6 (from 1 confederation)

The Choque de Gigantes (English: "Clash of Giants") is an international club baseball tournament scheduled to take place on November 8–10, 2024, at LoanDepot Park in Miami. The tournament will see six teams from three Caribbean winter leagues face off against each other: Venezuela (3), Puerto Rico (2), and the Dominican Republic (1).

== Background ==
Miami, with its large Latin American population, has been host to three Caribbean Series tournaments; the most recent edition, held in 2024 at LoanDepot Park with the cooperation of Major League Baseball's Miami Marlins, was considered a major success. As a result, the Caribbean Professional Baseball Confederation (CPBC) announced that the Caribbean Series would return to Miami in 2028.

Chema Sanchez, business development director of the Marlins, first mentioned the possibility of another club tournament in Miami on February 6, 2024, when he suggested that two Venezuelan teams, Leones del Caracas and Navegantes del Magallanes, could play a series at LoanDepot Park. This was confirmed on July 17, 2024, when the "Choque de Gigantes" tournament was announced by representatives of the Marlins and of the three participating leagues.

== Participating teams ==
Team	Manager	League
(Venezuela) Navegantes del Magallanes		Venezuelan Professional Baseball League (LVBP)
(Venezuela) Leones del Caracas		Venezuelan Professional Baseball League (LVBP)
(Venezuela) Cardenales de Lara		Venezuelan Professional Baseball League (LVBP)
(Puerto Rico) Criollos de Caguas		Roberto Clemente Professional Baseball League (LBPRC)
(Puerto Rico) Cangrejeros de Santurce		Roberto Clemente Professional Baseball League (LBPRC)
(Dominican Republic) Estrellas Orientales		Dominican Professional Baseball League (LIDOM)

== Venue ==
Miami, Florida	Choque de Gigantes is located in Miami
LoanDepot Park	Choque de Gigantes is located in Miami
Capacity: 36,742	Choque de Gigantes is located in Miami
