= Mark Sweeney =

American baseball player (born 1969)

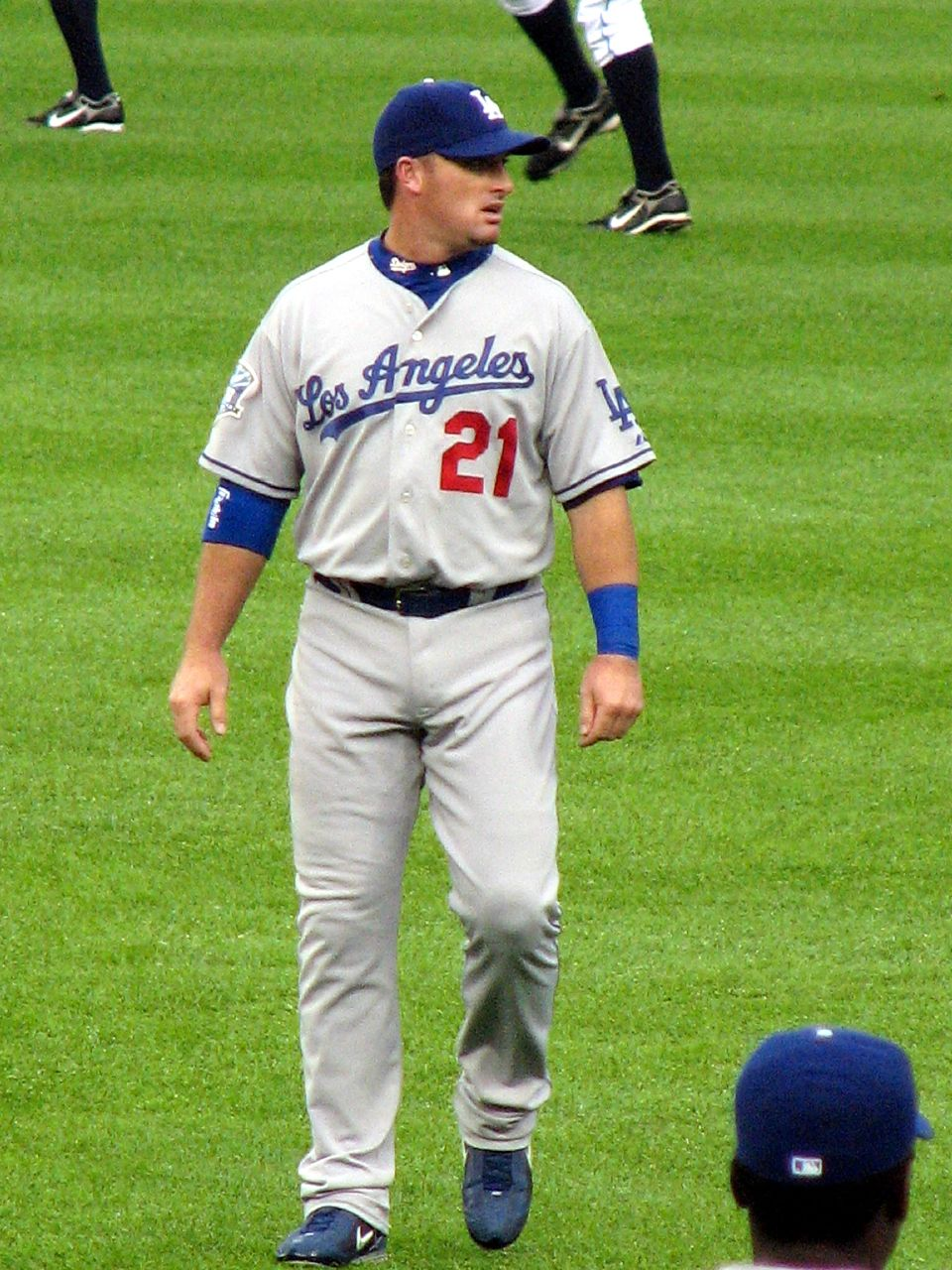
- Sweeney with the Los Angeles Dodgers
- Outfielder / First baseman
- Born: October 26, 1969 (age 56); Framingham, Massachusetts, U.S.
- Batted: Left Threw: Left

MLB debut
- August 4, 1995, for the St. Louis Cardinals

Last MLB appearance
- September 26, 2008, for the Los Angeles Dodgers

MLB statistics
- Batting average: .254
- Home runs: 42
- Runs batted in: 250
- Stats at Baseball Reference

Teams
- St. Louis Cardinals (1995–1997); San Diego Padres (1997–1998); Cincinnati Reds (1999); Milwaukee Brewers (2000–2001); San Diego Padres (2002); Colorado Rockies (2003–2004); San Diego Padres (2005); San Francisco Giants (2006–2007); Los Angeles Dodgers (2007–2008)

Mark Patrick Sweeney (born October 26, 1969) is an American sports commentator and former professional baseball outfielder and first baseman who is a telecast analyst for the St. Louis Cardinals of Major League Baseball (MLB). He played 14 seasons in MLB for the Cardinals, San Diego Padres, Cincinnati Reds, Milwaukee Brewers, Colorado Rockies, San Francisco Giants, and Los Angeles Dodgers. He is best known for his skill as a pinch hitter, where he ranks second in career pinch hits with 175 and first in career pinch hit runs batted in with 102.

== Early life ==
Sweeney attended Holliston High School in Holliston, Massachusetts, and was a student and a letterman in football and baseball. In baseball, he helped lead his team to the 1987 Massachusetts State Championship. He also led his football team as the quarterback to a state championship, winning the Tri–Valley League and a Superbowl in 1985.

== College career ==
Sweeney was signed to play quarterback for the University of Maine in Orono. There, he decided to play baseball full-time. He went on to become a Golden Spikes finalist, playing outfield, and breaking many of the school's offensive records. As a senior in 1991, he hit .384 with 23 home runs, 80 RBI and 22 stolen bases in 65 games; his strong season earned him the America East Player of the Year award.

While at Maine, he played collegiate summer baseball for three seasons in the Cape Cod Baseball League (CCBL) with the Chatham A's (1988) and Yarmouth–Dennis Red Sox (1989–90). In 1989 and 1990, he led the Red Sox to back-to-back league championships, and was named the playoff MVP in 1989. He received the league's sportsmanship award in 1990, and was inducted into the CCBL Hall of Fame in 2018.

== Professional career ==
=== Draft and minor leagues ===
Sweeney was drafted by the California Angels in the 9th round of the 1991 Major League Baseball draft. He made his professional debut in 1991 with the Boise Hawks in Single-A, batting .282 in 70 games. With the Angels organization he played for the Quad Cities River Bandits (1992), Palm Springs Angels (1993), Midland Angels (1993–1994) and Vancouver Canadians (1994–1995). On July 8, 1995, he was traded by the Angels to the St. Louis Cardinals for John Habyan. After playing in 22 games for the Triple-A Louisville Redbirds his contract was purchased by the Cardinals on August 4.

== MLB career ==
Sweeney made his major league debut on August 4, 1995, as the starting first baseman for the St. Louis Cardinals against the Chicago Cubs. He was hitless in four at-bats on his debut. He collected his first major league hit the next day against Cubs starter Jim Bullinger. He hit his first home run on August 10 against the Los Angeles Dodgers' Hideo Nomo.

He remained with the Cards until 1997 when he was traded to the San Diego Padres, along with Danny Jackson and Rich Batchelor, for Fernando Valenzuela, Phil Plantier and Scott Livingstone. He went two-for-three as a pinch hitter for the Padres in the 1998 World Series against the New York Yankees, making the last out of the Series by grounding out to third base.

After the season, he was traded by the Padres, along with Greg Vaughn, to the Cincinnati Reds for Josh Harris, Reggie Sanders, and Damian Jackson.

Sweeney spent one season with the Reds organization, much of which was spent with the Triple-A Indianapolis Indians. The Reds traded him on January 14, 2000, to the Milwaukee Brewers, along with Gene Altman, for Alex Ochoa. He spent the next two seasons with the Brewers shuttling between the Majors and Triple-A while battling through an assortment of injuries and trips to the disabled list.

In 2002, he was traded by the Brewers with Lou Collier, Jeromy Burnitz, Jeff D'Amico, and cash to the New York Mets for Glendon Rusch, Lenny Harris, and Alex Ochoa. He failed to make the Mets roster and was released. The San Diego Padres signed him as a free agent a few days later. Had a poor season with the Padres, hitting just .169 in 48 games.

Sweeney spent 2003 and 2004 with the Colorado Rockies, 2005 with the Padres, 2006–2007 with the San Francisco Giants and 2007 and 2008 with the Los Angeles Dodgers.

He has played first base, outfield, and designated hitter. In 1,218 career games, he is a lifetime .254 hitter, with 42 home runs, 250 runs batted in, and 16 stolen bases.

As a pinch-hitter, he recorded 175 hits in 679 at-bats for a .258 batting average with 15 home runs and 102 RBI in that role.

According to the New York Daily News in a story that broke in January 2007, Barry Bonds blamed a positive amphetamine test result during the 2006 season on a substance he took from Sweeney's locker. Sweeney's agent denied the claim that Bonds had gotten such a substance from Sweeney. Bonds would later clear Sweeney of any involvement in his positive amphetamine test.

On July 27, 2007, against the Florida Marlins, he moved into a tie for 2nd place (150 hits) on the all-time pinch hits list with Manny Mota with a pinch hit single. On July 29, 2007, he moved into sole possession of 2nd place behind Lenny Harris on the all-time pinch hits list with a game-tying, pinch hit double to deep right field in the 9th inning that scored Dave Roberts.

On August 9, 2007, Sweeney was traded to the Los Angeles Dodgers for second baseman Travis Denker. The trade was the first between the Giants and the Dodgers since 1985.

He remained with the Dodgers, primarily as a pinch hitter through the 2008 season. In May 2008, Sweeney surrendered his jersey number, 22, to his rookie teammate Clayton Kershaw, and adopted #21. Unable to find a playing position as a free agent for 2009, Sweeney officially announced his retirement on March 6, 2009. He subsequently rejoined the Dodgers organization as an assistant coach.

== Post-playing career ==
In 2012, Sweeney began working as a baseball correspondent and pregame color analyst for Padres telecasts on Fox Sports San Diego.

In the fall of 2013, Sweeney's number 12 was retired by his alma mater, the University of Maine.

In 2014, Sweeney started appearing on Fox Sports (United States) and Fox Sports 1 as a studio analyst.

In 2024, Sweeney joined the St. Louis Cardinals cable broadcast team on a limited basis on the pregame/postgame shows. In 2025, his role expanded to color analyst on roughly 40 games.

Sweeney is married to fitness instructor Cindy Whitmarsh, with whom he has a son and two stepdaughters.
