= Scott Schreer =

American musician (born 1953)

Scott P. Schreer (born 1953) is an American musician. He is a BMI composer and producer of theme songs for television programs, including NFL on Fox, NHL on Fox, Fox MLB, Fox NASCAR, Fox Sports News,News 4 New York,, Fox 32 News, Hope and Faith, The Cosby Show, and The O'Reilly Factor. As a musician and producer, he has garnered six Emmy nominations and has thousands of music titles to his credit. He is the president and CEO of NJJ Music Inc. and Freeplay Music Corp., as well as the CEO and founder of TuneSat, a global music technology company that uses proprietary audio fingerprint technology to track music and audio performances for composers and publishers on TV and the internet.

His theme for NFL on FOX has been credited with helping establish the brand identity of the program, as Fox executive George Greenburg explains that for viewers, "It becomes associated with the moment. That's what's doing the trick in your head. We're right there—we're right there when someone makes that incredible catch. And not only is the video there, but our music lives in that moment, too."

Scott has won seven BMI Writer of the Year Awards for his music. Most recently, the February 2015 edition of ESPN The Magazine entitled "The Music Issue" featured Schreer alongside fellow composer John Colby as the "Kings of the sports jingle."
