= Ken Rosenthal =

American baseball journalist (born 1962)

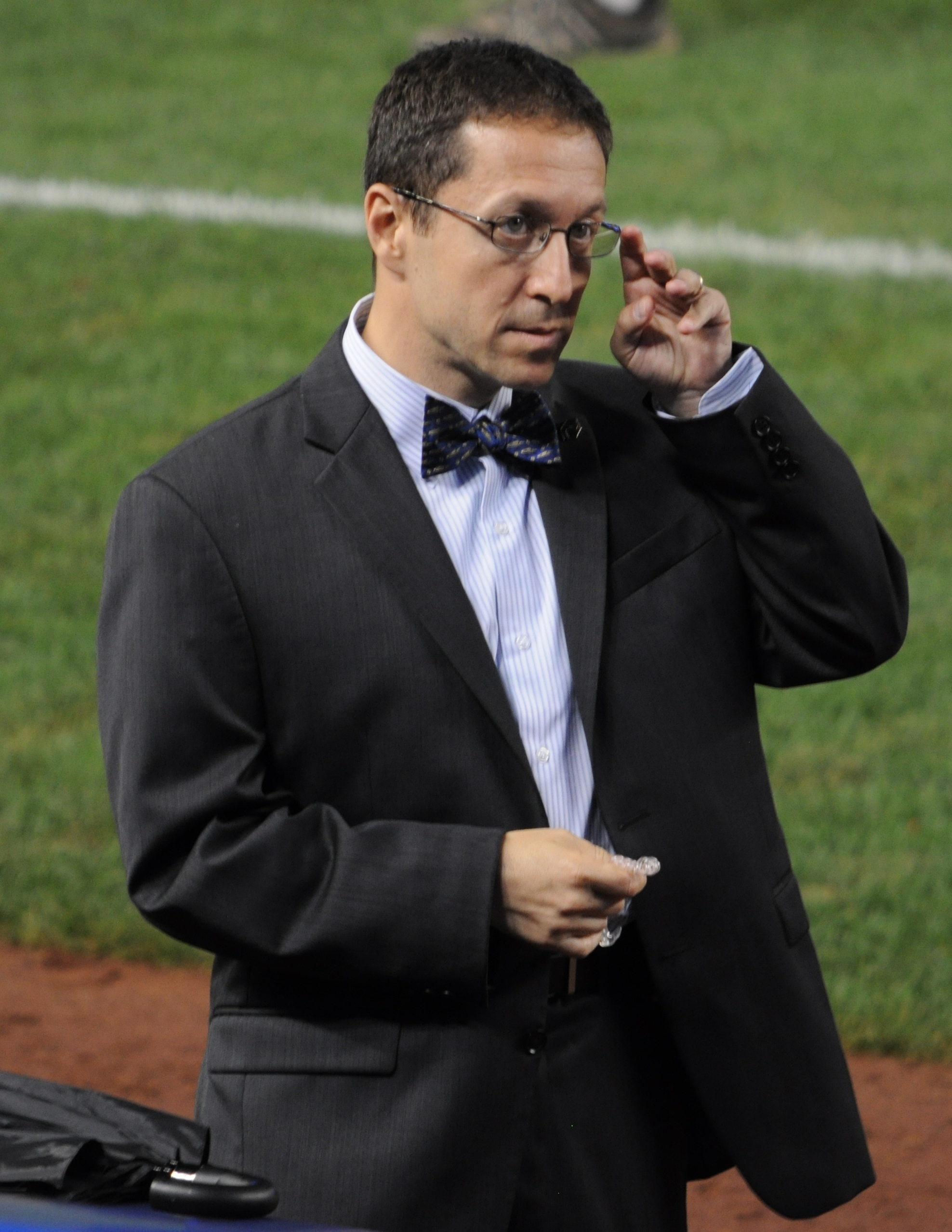
- Rosenthal at Yankee Stadium in 2012
- Born: September 19, 1962 (age 64); New York City, U.S.
- Education: University of Pennsylvania
- Occupations: Sportswriter, Field Reporter
- Years active: 1984–present
- Employers: Fox Sports (2005–present); MLB Network (2009–2022); The Athletic (2017–present)

Ken Rosenthal (born September 19, 1962) is an American sportswriter and reporter. He has served as a field reporter for Fox Major League Baseball since 2005, and was an in-studio reporter for MLB Network from 2009 to 2022. Since August 2017, he has been a senior baseball writer for The Athletic.

== Early life ==
Rosenthal was born in Queens, New York City, and grew up in the Long Island town of Oyster Bay, where he went to Oyster Bay High School. Rosenthal is Jewish. He graduated from the University of Pennsylvania in 1984.

== Career ==
=== Beginnings ===
Rosenthal served as an intern covering sports for Newsday on Long Island, and joined the York Daily Record in 1984. He moved on to the Courier-Post in Cherry Hill, New Jersey for two years before being employed by the Baltimore Sun, where he was named Maryland Sportswriter of the Year five times by the National Sportscasters and Sportswriters Association during his tenure from 1987 to 2000. Rosenthal simultaneously contributed to Sports Illustrated from 1990 to 2000, providing weekly notes during baseball season. He then spent five years at The Sporting News until 2005.

=== Fox Sports ===
Rosenthal joined Fox Sports in 2005. He regularly wears a bow tie when appearing on Fox Sports telecasts in support of various charitable organizations. In 2015 and 2016, Rosenthal won the Sports Emmy Award for Outstanding Sports Reporter for his work with Fox Sports and MLB Network.

In June 2017, FoxSports.com eliminated its writing staff to focus only on video, leaving Rosenthal temporarily without an editorial home. He began posting stories on his Facebook page. Rosenthal continued to contribute to Fox Sports in his role as a field reporter for their baseball coverage.

=== The Athletic ===
Rosenthal joined The Athletic in August 2017 as a senior baseball writer.

On November 12, 2019, Rosenthal and Evan Drellich were the first to break the news on the Houston Astros sign stealing scandal, reporting that during the 2017 MLB season, the Astros used a camera in center field to see what signal the catcher was giving, then banged on a metal trash can to relay it to the batter. MLB quickly launched an investigation following this.

=== MLB Network ===
Rosenthal joined MLB Network in 2009 as a "baseball insider."

With MLB Network, Rosenthal contributed to Trade Deadline and National Baseball Hall of Fame coverage, as well as the offseason weekday morning show Hot Stove.

Rosenthal's stint with MLB Network ended in January 2022 after more than twelve years due to a contract non-renewal. He stated on Twitter:

Can confirm MLB Network has decided not to bring me back. I'm grateful for the more than 12 years I spent there, and my enduring friendships with on-air personalities, producers and staff. I always strove to maintain my journalistic integrity, and my work reflects that. Nothing else is changing for me professionally. I am proud to remain part of the great teams at The Athletic and Fox Sports.
