= Tom Verducci =

American sportswriter

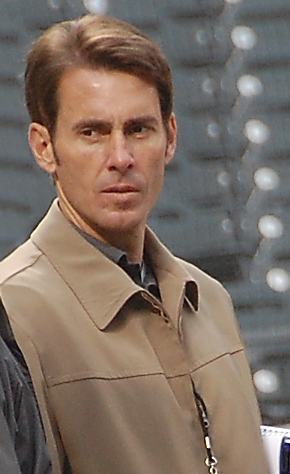
- Verducci at Citi Field in 2011
- Born: 1960 (age 65–66); East Orange, New Jersey, U.S.
- Education: Penn State University (B.A.)
- Occupations: Sportswriter; Sportscaster
- Years active: 1982–present

Thomas Matthew Verducci (born 1960) is an American sportswriter who wrote for Sports Illustrated and now writes for SI.com, an online magazine. He writes primarily about baseball. He is also a reporter and commentator for Fox Major League Baseball and MLB Network.

== Early life and education ==
Verducci was born in East Orange, New Jersey and grew up in Glen Ridge. He attended Seton Hall Prep in West Orange, New Jersey, where his father was a legendary high school football coach who won over 200 games, and Penn State, graduating with a B.A. degree in journalism, where he was a reporter for The Daily Collegian and was a walk-on member of the baseball team. He wrote for the first edition of The Weekly Collegian.

== Writing career ==
After a year with Florida Today, Verducci moved to New York Newsday in 1983, becoming a columnist in 1990. He began writing for Sports Illustrated in 1993. In 2005, while writing for the magazine, Verducci briefly joined the Toronto Blue Jays as an outfielder for spring training. He is a regular guest on The Dan Patrick Show.

In 1997, Verducci teamed with Yankees manager Joe Torre on his autobiography Chasing The Dream: My Lifelong Journey to the World Series. He reunited with Torre 12 years later to co-write The Yankee Years, an in-depth look at the team from 1996-2007, as well as Torre's relationship with executives like owner George Steinbrenner, General Manager Brian Cashman, and players like Alex Rodriguez.

In 2017 Verducci wrote The Cubs Way about Theo Epstein and a perfect 5-year plan taking the Cubs from a 101-loss season in 2012 to the 2016 World Series Champions. In October 2020, Verducci was in the MLB's "Playoff Bubble" covering the postseason for FOX's MLB broadcast. He appeared on Sports Illustrated's daily cover on October 27, 2020.

In 2020, he wrote a 13-chapter series for Sports Illustrated, Love, Loss and Baseball, about the 1918 season. The series is written in the form of letters chronicling baseball during the 1918 Spanish Flu pandemic. In 2022, he co-wrote Joe Maddon's book The Book of Joe: Trying Not to Suck at Baseball and Life, which later inspired a podcast the two have jointly hosted since 2022.

== Broadcasting career ==
In addition to his writing duties, Verducci works in television. He works for MLB Network, where he serves as a "baseball insider" and co-host of several programs with Bob Costas. He called his first World Series in 2014 for Fox alongside Joe Buck and Harold Reynolds. Verducci was the first non-former player or manager to work in the broadcast booth as a color commentator for a World Series telecast or any pro sports since ABC's Howard Cosell in 1983. Verducci and Reynolds were replaced by John Smoltz as Fox's top baseball analyst following the 2015 season. He worked the 2016 World Series as a sideline reporter, a role he still has to this day. He was a studio analyst for FOX during the 2016 World Series.

== Personal life ==
Verducci lives in the Belle Mead section of Montgomery Township, New Jersey, with his wife, Kirsten, and two sons. His brother Frank Verducci was the offensive coordinator for UConn and currently serves as a recruting and personnel analyst for Nebraska Their aunt is Joan Hodges, wife of Gil Hodges. The brothers are of Italian descent.

Preceded by Tim McCarver	Lead color commentator, Major League Baseball on Fox (with Harold Reynolds); 2014-2015	Succeeded by John Smoltz
