= List of MLB on Fox broadcasters =

== Commentators (as of 2026) ==
=== Play-by-play ===
- Joe Davis
- Adam Amin
- Kenny Albert
- Kevin Kugler
- Jeff Levering
- Don Orsillo
- Connor Onion
- Eric Collins
- Trent Rush

=== Color commentators ===
- John Smoltz
- A. J. Pierzynski
- Adam Wainwright
- Eric Karros
- Tom Verducci
- Mark Sweeney
- Dontrelle Willis

=== Field reporters ===
- Ken Rosenthal
- Tom Verducci
- Tom Rinaldi

=== Studio hosts ===
- Kevin Burkhardt
- Chris Myers (fill-in)
- Mike Hill (fill-in)

=== Studio analysts ===
- Alex Rodriguez
- David Ortiz
- Derek Jeter
- Dontrelle Willis
- Eric Karros
- A. J. Pierzynski
- Mark Sweeney

== Pairings history ==
=== 1990s ===
==== 1996–1997 ====
1. Joe Buck/Tim McCarver/Bob Brenly
2. Thom Brennaman/Bob Brenly
3. John Rooney/Jeff Torborg
4. Josh Lewin/Ken Singleton

==== 1998 ====
1. Joe Buck/Tim McCarver/Bob Brenly
2. Thom Brennaman/Bob Brenly
3. John Rooney/Jeff Torborg
4. Josh Lewin/Frank Robinson or George Brett

==== 1999 ====
1. Joe Buck/Tim McCarver/Bob Brenly
2. Thom Brennaman/Bob Brenly
3. Chip Caray/Jeff Torborg
4. Josh Lewin/Frank Robinson or Kevin Kennedy

=== 2000s ===
==== 2000 ====
1. Joe Buck/Tim McCarver/Bob Brenly
2. Thom Brennaman/Bob Brenly
3. Josh Lewin/Kevin Kennedy
4. Chip Caray/Jeff Torborg

==== 2001–2005 ====
1. Joe Buck/Tim McCarver/Ken Rosenthal (2005)
2. Thom Brennaman/Steve Lyons
3. Josh Lewin/Regional Weekly Hire
4. Kenny Albert/Regional Weekly Hire

==== 2006 ====
1. Joe Buck/Tim McCarver/Ken Rosenthal
2. Thom Brennaman/Steve Lyons
3. Josh Lewin/Lou Piniella
4. Kenny Albert/Regional Weekly Hire

==== 2007 ====
1. Joe Buck/Tim McCarver/Ken Rosenthal
2. Thom Brennaman/Joe Girardi
3. Josh Lewin/Eric Karros, Kenny Albert or Matt Vasgersian/Mark Grace

==== 2008 ====
1. Joe Buck, Tom McCarthy, Kenny Albert, Dick Stockton, Howie Rose, or Josh Lewin/Tim McCarver/Ken Rosenthal
2. Thom Brennaman/Mark Grace
3. Kenny Albert/Eric Karros

Matt Vasgersian was a regular announcer. Dick Stockton and Josh Lewin were also regular fill-in announcers. Leo Mazzone was a fill-in color commentator.

==== 2009 ====
1. Joe Buck or Josh Lewin/Tim McCarver or Eric Karros/Ken Rosenthal
2. Thom Brennaman/Mark Grace
3. Kenny Albert/Eric Karros

Dick Stockton and Josh Lewin were also regular fill-in announcers.

=== 2010s ===
==== 2010 ====
1. Joe Buck/Tim McCarver/Ken Rosenthal (All-Star Game, NLCS, World Series)
2. Thom Brennaman/Mark Grace (regular season only)
3. Kenny Albert/Eric Karros

Josh Lewin filled-in during the NHL and NBA playoffs and NFL season.

==== 2011 ====
1. Joe Buck/Tim McCarver/Ken Rosenthal
2. Thom Brennaman/Eric Karros (regular season only)
3. Kenny Albert/Mark Grace

Matt Vasgersian, Dick Stockton, and Josh Lewin were also regular fill-in announcers.

==== 2012–2013 ====
1. Joe Buck/Tim McCarver
2. Thom Brennaman/Eric Karros or Tom Verducci
3. Kenny Albert/Regional Weekly Hire
4. Dick Stockton/Regional Weekly Hire (night game weeks only)

Dave Sims and Eric Karros called Philip Humber's perfect game on April 21, 2012.

==== 2014 ====
1. Joe Buck or Kenny Albert/Harold Reynolds and Tom Verducci/Ken Rosenthal and Erin Andrews
2. Thom Brennaman/Eric Karros (April–August) or Matt Vasgersian/John Smoltz/Jon Paul Morosi (September-postseason)
3. Justin Kutcher/Regional Weekly Hire
4. Kenny Albert/Regional Weekly Hire

==== 2015 ====
1. Joe Buck, Kenny Albert, or Aaron Goldsmith/Harold Reynolds and Tom Verducci/Ken Rosenthal
2. Matt Vasgersian/John Smoltz/Jon Paul Morosi
3. Kenny Albert/Eric Karros
4. Joe Davis/Regional Weekly Hire
5. Justin Kutcher/Regional Weekly Hire

A. J. Pierzynski joined Vasgersian/Smoltz/Morosi for the 2015 ALDS.

==== 2016 ====
1. Joe Buck or Matt Vasgersian/John Smoltz/Ken Rosenthal
2. Kenny Albert/Harold Reynolds/Tom Verducci/Jon Paul Morosi
3. Matt Vasgersian/Eric Karros
4. Joe Davis/Regional Weekly Hire
5. Justin Kutcher/Regional Weekly Hire
6. Aaron Goldsmith/Regional Weekly Hire

==== 2017 ====
1. Joe Buck or Matt Vasgersian/John Smoltz/Ken Rosenthal and Tom Verducci
2. Kenny Albert or Joe Davis/A. J. Pierzynski/Jon Paul Morosi
3. Matt Vasgersian or Justin Kutcher/Eric Karros
4. Joe Davis/Regional Weekly Hire
5. Justin Kutcher/Regional Weekly Hire
6. Aaron Goldsmith/Regional Weekly Hire

David Cone, who served as a color commentator on select games for the New York Yankees on the YES Network, joined Davis/Pierzynski/Morosi for the 2017 ALDS.

==== 2018 ====
1. Joe Buck (NLCS, World Series, All-Star Game, select regular season games) or Joe Davis (Division Series, most regular season games)/John Smoltz/Ken Rosenthal and Tom Verducci
2. Kenny Albert, Kevin Burkhardt or Don Orsillo/A. J. Pierzynski/David Cone/Jon Paul Morosi
3. Justin Kutcher/Eric Karros or C. J. Nitkowski
4. Joe Davis/Regional Weekly Hire
5. Aaron Goldsmith/Regional Weekly Hire

==== 2019 ====
1. Joe Buck (ALCS, World Series, All-Star Game, select regular season games) or Joe Davis (Division Series, most regular season games) /John Smoltz/Ken Rosenthal and Tom Verducci
2. Kenny Albert or Len Kasper/A. J. Pierzynski and/or Joe Girardi/Jon Paul Morosi
3. Justin Kutcher or Jeff Levering or Eric Collins/Eric Karros and/or C. J. Nitkowski, or John Farrell
4. Len Kasper or Don Orsillo/Regional Weekly Hire
5. Aaron Goldsmith/Regional Weekly Hire

Joe Davis filled-in for Buck during Game 4 of the ALCS while Buck called Thursday Night Football.

=== 2020s ===
Primary team for each pairing indicated in bold.

==== 2020 ====
1. **Joe Buck**, Joe Davis, Kevin Burkhardt, or Aaron Goldsmith/**John Smoltz**/**Ken Rosenthal** and/or Tom Verducci (All-Star game and Playoffs only)
2. **Adam Amin**, Joe Davis, Aaron Goldsmith or Don Orsillo/**A. J. Pierzynski** and/or Adam Wainwright (Playoffs only)/Tom Verducci (NLDS)
3. **Don Orsillo**, Adam Amin, or Kevin Burkhardt/**Eric Karros**

==== 2021 ====
1. **Joe Buck**, Aaron Goldsmith, Joe Davis, or Don Orsillo/**John Smoltz** or A. J. Pierzynski/**Ken Rosenthal** and/or Tom Verducci
2. **Adam Amin**, Aaron Goldsmith or Wayne Randazzo/**A. J. Pierzynski**, Tom Verducci or Eric Karros/Tom Verducci (playoffs only)
3. **Joe Davis**, Aaron Goldsmith, Don Orsillo, Len Kasper or Wayne Randazzo/**Eric Karros** or Mark Sweeney
4. **Aaron Goldsmith** or Don Orsillo/**Mark Sweeney**

==== 2022 ====
1. **Joe Davis**, Aaron Goldsmith, Adam Amin, or Cory Provus/**John Smoltz**, A. J. Pierzynski, Eric Karros, or Tom Verducci/**Ken Rosenthal** and/or Tom Verducci
2. **Adam Amin**, Kenny Albert, Don Orsillo, Jeff Levering, Kevin Kugler, Aaron Goldsmith, or Len Kasper/**A. J. Pierzynski** and/or Eric Karros/Tom Verducci (playoffs only)
3. **Aaron Goldsmith**, Kenny Albert, Kevin Kugler, or Don Orsillo/**Tom Verducci** or Eric Karros

==== 2023 ====
1. **Joe Davis**, Adam Amin, Jeff Levering, Kenny Albert, Jason Benetti, or Aaron Goldsmith/**John Smoltz**, Eric Karros, A.J. Pierzynski, or Tom Verducci/**Ken Rosenthal** and/or Tom Verducci (World Series and All-Star Game only)
2. **Adam Amin**, Jason Benetti, Kenny Albert, Wayne Randazzo, or Kevin Kugler/**A.J. Pierzynski** and/or Adam Wainwright (playoffs only), Eric Karros, or Tom Verducci/Tom Verducci (playoffs only)
3. **Jason Benetti**, Aaron Goldsmith, Jeff Levering, or Kevin Kugler/**Tom Verducci** or Brian Anderson

==== 2024 ====
1. **Joe Davis**, Jason Benetti, Adam Amin, Wayne Randazzo, Brandon Gaudin, Cory Provus, or Kenny Albert/**John Smoltz**, A. J. Pierzynski, Adam Wainwright, or Eric Karros/**Ken Rosenthal** and/or Tom Verducci (All-Star Game and World Series only)
2. **Adam Amin**, Wayne Randazzo, Aaron Goldsmith, Jason Benetti, Jeff Levering, Don Orsillo, Kevin Kugler, or Cory Provus/**A. J. Pierzynski and/or Adam Wainwright**/Tom Verducci (playoffs only)
3. **Jason Benetti**, Kenny Albert, or Kevin Kugler/**Eric Karros**, Mark Sweeney or John Smoltz

==== 2025 ====
1. **Joe Davis** or Adam Amin or Aaron Goldsmith or Kenny Albert or Jason Benetti or Wayne Randazzo/**John Smoltz** or A. J. Pierzynski/**Ken Rosenthal** and/or Tom Verducci (Speedway Classic, All-Star Game and World Series only)
2. **Adam Amin** or Jason Benetti or Jeff Levering or Kenny Albert or Don Orsillo or Alex Faust/**A. J. Pierzynski and/or Adam Wainwright** or Eric Karros/**Tom Verducci (playoffs only)** or Ken Rosenthal
3. **Jason Benetti** or Don Orsillo or Kenny Albert or Cory Provus/**Tom Verducci** or Eric Karros or Dontrelle Willis

==== 2026 ====
1. **Joe Davis** or Adam Amin or Eric Collins/**John Smoltz**/**Ken Rosenthal** and/or Tom Verducci
2. **Adam Amin** or Joe Davis/Kevin Kugler/**A. J. Pierzynski and/or Adam Wainwright**/**Tom Verducci** or Ken Rosenthal
3. Brandon Gaudin or Aaron Goldsmith/Tom Verducci or Eric Karros
4. Aaron Goldsmith/A. J. Pierzynski

=== Studio ===
- Chip Caray/Dave Winfield/Steve Lyons (1996)
- Chip Caray/Steve Lyons (1997–1998)
- Keith Olbermann/Steve Lyons (1999–2000)
- Jeanne Zelasko/Kevin Kennedy (2001–2008)
- Jeanne Zelasko/Kevin Kennedy/Eric Karros (2007–2008), Mark Grace (2007–2008), or Joe Girardi (2007)
- Chris Rose (2009–2011) (on-site)
- Chris Rose/Kevin Millar (2010 primetime games)
- Chris Rose/Mitch Williams (2011 primetime games)
- Matt Vasgersian or Greg Amsinger/Harold Reynolds/Kevin Millar (2012–2013) (Primary hosts in MLB Network studios)
- Kevin Burkhardt or Rob Stone or Ryan Field or Chris Myers/Frank Thomas/Gabe Kapler/C. J. Nitkowski (2014)
- Kevin Burkhardt or Rob Stone or Ryan Field or Chris Myers/Frank Thomas/Raul Ibanez/Dontrelle Willis/Mark Sweeney/C. J. Nitkowski/Pete Rose (2015)
- Kevin Burkhardt or Chris Myers/Frank Thomas/Eric Karros/Pete Rose/C. J. Nitkowski/Dontrelle Willis (2016)
- Kevin Burkhardt or Chris Myers or Mike Hill/Frank Thomas/Alex Rodriguez/Eric Karros/Dontrelle Willis/Nick Swisher/A. J. Pierzynski/Mark Sweeney (2017)
- Kevin Burkhardt or Chris Myers or Mike Hill/Frank Thomas/Alex Rodriguez/David Ortiz/Eric Karros/Dontrelle Willis/Nick Swisher/A. J. Pierzynski/Mark Sweeney (2018–2022)
- Kevin Burkhardt or Chris Myers or Mike Hill/Alex Rodriguez/David Ortiz/Derek Jeter/Eric Karros/Dontrelle Willis/A. J. Pierzynski/Mark Sweeney (2023–present)

== Commentators ==
=== Current ===
==== Play-by-play ====
- Kenny Albert (play-by-play, 2001–2019; fill-in play-by-play, since 2022)
- Adam Amin (#2 play-by-play, since 2020)
- Joe Davis (play-by-play, since 2015), (fill-in lead play-by-play, 2018–2021), (lead play-by-play, since 2022),
- Jeff Levering (fill-in play-by-play)
- Don Orsillo (fill-in play-by-play)
- Connor Onion (fill-in play-by-play)
- Eric Collins (fill-in play-by-play)
- Trent Rush (fill-in play-by-play)

==== Game analysts ====
- Eric Karros (game analyst, since 2007)
- A. J. Pierzynski (#2 game analyst, since 2017), (postseason game analyst, 2015), (postseason studio analyst, 2011–2013)
- John Smoltz (lead game analyst, since 2016), (#2 analyst 2014–2015)
- Tom Verducci (postseason field reporter (LCS and World Series) since 2016), (co-lead analyst 2014–2015), (#2 analyst, 2016)

==== Field reporters ====
- Jon Morosi (#2 field reporter, since 2014)
- Ken Rosenthal (lead field reporter, since 2005)
- Tom Verducci (postseason field reporter (LCS and World Series) since 2016), (co-lead analyst 2014–2015), (#2 analyst 2016)
- Tom Rinaldi (Since 2021)

==== Studio hosts and analysts ====
- Kevin Burkhardt (studio host, since 2014), (fill in play-by-play, since 2015)
- Chris Myers (postseason field reporter, 2004–2012), (play-by-play, 2012–2013), (fill-in studio host, 2014–present)
- Matt Vasgersian (fill-in postseason studio host 2022–2025, fill-in lead play–by–play 2016–2017, #2 play–by–play 2014–2015, play–by–play 2006–2008, studio host 2012–2013)
- Derek Jeter (studio analyst, since 2023)
- David Ortiz (postseason studio analyst, since 2017)
- Alex Rodriguez (studio analyst, since 2017), (postseason studio analyst, 2015–present)
- Nick Swisher (studio analyst, since 2017)
- Dontrelle Willis (studio analyst, since 2015)

=== Former ===
==== Play-by-play ====
- Jason Benetti (#3 play-by-play, 2023–2025)
- Thom Brennaman (#2 play–by–play 1996–2014)
- Joe Buck (lead play-by-play, 1996–2021)
- Chip Caray (studio host, 1996–1998), (play-by-play, 1999–2000)
- Mike Joy (fill-in play-by-play, 2008)
- Justin Kutcher (play-by-play, 2013–2019)
- Josh Lewin (play-by-play, 1996–2011)
- John Rooney (play-by-play, 1996–1998)

==== Game analysts ====
- Bob Brenly (#2 game analyst, 1996–2000), (playoff game analyst for 2004 NLCS & 2005 NLCS)
- Joe Girardi (#2 game analyst, 2007), (fill in studio analyst, 2007)
- Kevin Kennedy (game analyst, 1999–2000), (studio analyst, 2001–2008)
- Steve Lyons (studio analyst 1996–2000), (#2 game analyst, 2001–2006)
- Tim McCarver (lead game analyst, 1996–2013)
- Leo Mazzone (game analyst, 2008)
- Bret Boone (playoff game analyst for 2003 ALCS)
- Al Leiter (playoff game analyst for 2003 NLCS & 2004 ALCS)
- Luis Gonzalez (playoff game analyst for 2006 NLCS)
- Jose Mota (#2 game analyst for 2006 ALCS Game 4-Until series conclusion)
- Lou Piniella (game analyst, 2005 ALCS–2006)
- Harold Reynolds (co-lead analyst 2014–2015), (#2 game analyst 2016)
- Frank Robinson (game analyst, 1998–1999)
- Ken Singleton (game analyst, 1996–1997)
- Jeff Torborg (game analyst, 1996–2000, 2003–2005)

==== Studio hosts ====
- Chip Caray (studio host, 1996–1998), (play-by-play, 1999–2000)
- Keith Olbermann (studio host, 1999–2000)
- Chris Rose (studio host, 2009–2011)
- Matt Vasgersian (fill in lead play–by–play 2016–2017, #2 play–by–play 2014–2015, play–by–play 2006–2008, studio host 2012–2013)
- Jeanne Zelasko (studio host, 2001–2008) (later on Judge Joe Brown)

==== Studio analysts ====
- Mark Grace (studio analyst 2007–2008), (#2 game analyst, 2009–2011)
- Gabe Kapler (studio analyst, 2014)
- Kevin Kennedy (game analyst, 1999–2000), (studio analyst, 2001–2008)
- Steve Lyons (studio analyst 1996–2000), (#2 game analyst, 2001–2006)
- Pete Rose (studio analyst, 2015–2016)
- Frank Thomas (studio analyst, 2014–2022)
- Dave Winfield (studio analyst, 1996)

==== Field reporters ====
- Erin Andrews (postseason field reporter, 2012–2015)

=== Current and former fill-in broadcasters ===
==== Play-by-play ====
- Dick Bremer (fill-in play-by-play)
- Matt Devlin (fill-in play-by-play)
- Scott Graham (fill-in play-by-play)
- Mario Impemba (fill-in play-by-play)
- Duane Kuiper (fill-in play-by-play)
- Glen Kuiper (fill-in play-by-play)
- Tom McCarthy (fill-in play-by-play)
- Dan McLaughlin (fill-in play-by-play)
- Chris Myers (fill-in play-by-play)
- Mel Proctor (fill-in play-by-play, 2002–2004)
- Wayne Randazzo (fill-in play-by-play)
- Daron Sutton (fill-in play-by-play)

==== Game analysts ====
- Rod Allen (fill-in game analyst)
- Larry Andersen (fill-in game analyst)
- Bert Blyleven (fill-in game analyst)
- George Brett (fill-in game analyst)
- Sean Casey (fill-in game analyst)
- Jim Deshaies (fill-in game analyst)
- Ray Fosse (fill-in game analyst)
- Mark Grant (fill-in game analyst)
- Al Hrabosky (fill-in game analyst)
- Rex Hudler (fill-in game analyst)
- Darrin Jackson (fill-in game analyst)
- Jim Kaat (fill-in game analyst)
- John Kruk (fill-in game analyst)
- Al Leiter (playoff game analyst, 2003–2004)
- Joe Magrane (fill in game analyst)
- Rick Manning (fill-in game analyst)
- Kevin Millar (fill-in game analyst, primetime game studio analyst)
- José Mota (fill-in game analyst)
- Jim Palmer (fill in game analyst)
- Kevin Kennedy (fill-in game analyst) (former studio analyst)
- Mike Krukow (fill-in game analyst)
- Jerry Remy (fill-in game analyst)
- Bill Ripken (fill-in game analyst)
- F. P. Santangelo (fill-in game analyst)
- Bill Schroeder (fill-in commentator)
- Tom Verducci (fill-in game analyst)
- Bob Walk (fill-in game analyst)

==== Other broadcasters ====
- Patrick O'Neal (playoff sideline reporter, 2004–2005) currently the pregame host for both the Los Angeles Angels and Los Angeles Kings on Bally Sports West.

== Additional notes ==
- Until the 2000 World Series, Bob Brenly, who normally did West Coast games with Thom Brennaman, regularly joined Joe Buck and Tim McCarver in the booth for big events (All-Star Game, potential record-breaking games, one League Championship Series, and the World Series. However, he became the manager of the Arizona Diamondbacks, who won the World Series under Brenly just a year later. After Brenly was fired by the Diamondbacks in the 2004 season, he briefly returned to Fox until being hired by the Chicago Cubs as their color commentator.
- In 2001, Jeanne Zelasko became the first woman in more than a decade to regularly host Major League Baseball games for a network. The network canceled the pre-game show (as a cost-cutting measure) following the 2008 season.
- In 2020, play-by-play announcers and color commentators called the games from the Fox Network Center in Los Angeles, CA.

== See also ==
- List of current Major League Baseball broadcasters
