= MLB on FS1 =

MLB baseball cable telecasts (2014–present)

- Fox Sports 1's Major League Baseball logo as of the 2020 season.
- Also known as: MLB on FS1; MLB on Fox Sports 1
- Genre: American baseball game telecasts
- Starring: See MLB on Fox broadcasters
- Theme music composer: NJJ Music (2014–present); Scott Schreer (2014–2019)
- Opening theme: "MLB on Fox theme music" (2020–present); "NFL on Fox theme music" (2014–2019)
- Country of origin: United States
- Original language: English
- No. of seasons: 13 (through 2026 season)

Production
- Production locations: Various MLB stadiums (game telecasts); Fox Network Center, Los Angeles, California (studio segments, pregame and postgame shows)
- Camera setup: Multi-camera
- Running time: 210 minutes or until game ends (inc. adverts)
- Production companies: Major League Baseball; Fox Sports

Original release
- Network: FS1
- Release: April 5, 2014 – present

Related
- MLB on Fox

MLB on FS1 is the de facto title for the presentation of Major League Baseball (MLB) games produced by Fox Sports for Fox Sports 1 (FS1). FS1 airs 40 regular season MLB games (mostly on Saturdays), along with post-season games from the Division Series and League Championship Series and the World Baseball Classic.

== Business history ==
On September 19, 2012, Sports Business Daily reported that Major League Baseball would agree to separate eight-year television deals with Fox Sports and Turner Sports through the 2021 season. Fox would reportedly pay around $4 billion over eight years (close to $500 million per year), while Turner would pay around $2.8 billion over eight years (more than $300 million per year). Under the new deals, Fox and TBS' coverage would essentially be the same as in the 2007–2013 contract with the exception of Fox and TBS splitting coverage of the Division Series, which TBS has broadcast exclusively dating back to 2007. More importantly, Fox would carry some of the games (such as the Saturday afternoon Game of the Week) on its new general sports channel, Fox Sports 1, which launched on August 17, 2013. Sources also said it was possible that Fox would sell some League Division Series games to MLB Network.

On October 2, 2012, the new deal between Major League Baseball and Fox was officially confirmed; it included the television rights to 12 Saturday afternoon games on Fox (reduced from 26), 40 games on Fox Sports 1, rights to the All-Star Game, two League Division Series (two games were sold to MLB Network, the rest would air on Fox Sports 1), one League Championship Series (in which Fox Sports and Turner Sports would each respectively alternate coverage of American League and National League postseason games each year on an odd-even basis, with Games 1 and, if necessary, 6 in 2014 airing on Fox), and the World Series (which would remain on Fox). In addition, all Fox Saturday Baseball games would be made available on MLB Extra Innings and MLB.TV (subject to local blackout restrictions), Fox Sports was awarded TV Everywhere rights for streaming of game telecasts on computers, mobile and tablet devices, rights to a nightly baseball highlights show, Spanish language rights to all games carried on Fox and Fox Cable (Fox Deportes) and rights to a weekly show produced by MLB Productions.

On November 15, 2018, Fox renewed its rights through 2028, maintaining its existing structure but with expanded digital rights, and a promise to begin airing more games on the Fox broadcast network (beginning with at least two of the first four League Championship Series games and all seventh games from 2020 to 2028, with additional games in 2022). It had been criticized for airing only Game 1 of the 2019 American League Championship Series, while placing the rest on Fox Sports 1.

== Scheduling history ==
As of 2026, most FS1 games air Saturday afternoons, with additional, irregularly scheduled weeknight games. These games are non-exclusive, meaning they are also carried by the teams' regular local broadcasters and are typically blacked out in those markets. FS1's coverage begins with a pregame show a half-hour before the game.

=== Postseason coverage ===
With FS1 taking over most MLB coverage in 2014, postseason coverage on Fox Sports' end of the package began to be split between the Fox broadcast network and FS1. The deal, which brought back Division Series baseball to Fox for the first time since 2006, put Fox's Division Series games exclusively on FS1. As part of their contract renewal before the 2019 season, Fox has agreed to air any League Championship Series Game 7 that Fox Sports has rights to (not including the game 7 on TBS) on the broadcast network. Fox airs the World Series in its entirety, as has been the case every year since 2000.

For the 2020 NLCS however, while Fox aired Games 1, 4 and 7, FS1 aired every game except Game 1 as it simulcast Games 4 and 7. (Game 4 was scheduled to air only on FS1 but the postponement of a previously scheduled Thursday Night Football game that was supposed to air on Fox allowed both Fox and FS1 to air the game.)

For the 2021 ALCS, Fox aired Games 1 and 2 while FS1 aired Games 2–6 (Game 2 was simulcast on both channels), Game 7 would have aired on both networks had the series gone its distance. From 2022 on, Fox will air more postseason games as part of the renewal made in 2018.

== Digital on-screen graphics ==
In 2020, Fox unveiled a new graphics package for its NFL and college football coverage starting with Super Bowl LIV. Baseball broadcasts continued using this package through the end of the 2021 regular season, as the new on-screen look is for football only. Beginning with the 2021 season, Fox and FS1 started using stylized cartoon illustrations on players rather than traditional photos, similar to those used on the network's NFL coverage since the previous year's Super Bowl.

== Theme music ==
NJJ Music composed the original MLB on Fox theme music in 1996. This theme music was used exclusively from June 1996 until early May 2007. In mid-May 2007, an updated version was unveiled, featuring a more jazzy feel and implementing a full orchestra instead of the synth elements used by the 1996 theme.

Beginning with the 2010 postseason, both the 2007 theme and the Flach theme were replaced by the longtime NFL on Fox theme music, which began to be used for all Fox sporting events.

In 2014, the 2007–2010 jazz theme was brought back for regular season games on MLB on FS1. The NFL theme was retained for MLB on Fox, including Fox Saturday Baseball, Baseball Night in America, the All-Star Game and all coverage of the postseason. However, occasionally one of the two themes was heard on telecasts that were designated for the other, implying that the designations are slightly fluid.

In 2020, MLB on Fox reintroduced the original 1996–2007 theme; Fox Sports regional affiliates continued to use the 2007–2010 theme until the network was rebranded to Bally Sports in 2021. As of the 2021 season, the original theme is now used for coverage of all games across both Fox and FS1.

== Ratings ==
The largest regular season MLB audience on FS1 is for a June 2018 game between the New York Yankees and Tampa Bay Rays. The game averaged 980,000 viewers.

=== Postseason ===
- 2014 National League Championship Series
  - Game 2: 4.4 million viewers
  - Game 4: 5.1 million viewers
  - Game 5: 4.9 million viewers
- 2015 American League Championship Series
  - Game 1: 5.9 million viewers
  - Game 6: 5.6 million viewers
- 2016 National League Championship Series
  - Game 2: 7.3 million viewers
  - Game 6: 9.7 million viewers
- 2017 American League Championship Series
  - Game 1: 6.2 million viewers
  - Game 3: 3.1 (5.1 million viewers)
  - Game 4: 4.7 million viewers
  - Game 5: 3.3 (5.3 million viewers)
  - Game 6: 8.2 million viewers
  - Game 7: 9.9 million viewers
- 2018 National League Division Series
  - Milwaukee Brewers vs. Colorado Rockies
    - Game 1: 2.46 million viewers
    - Game 2: 1.77 million viewers
  - Los Angeles Dodgers vs. Atlanta Braves
    - Game 2: 2.03 million viewers
    - Game 3: 3.02 million viewers
    - Game 4: 2.17 million viewers
- 2018 National League Championship Series
  - Game 1: 4.64 million viewers
  - Game 3: 4.21 million viewers
  - Game 4: 4.21 million viewers
- 2019 American League Division Series
  - New York Yankees vs Minnesota Twins
    - Game 2: 2.32 million viewers
    - Game 3: 2.66 million viewers
  - Houston Astros vs Tampa Bay Rays
    - Game 1: 2.53 million viewers
    - Game 2: 1.39 million viewers
    - Game 4: 3.70 million viewers
    - Game 5: 3.67 million viewers
- 2019 American League Championship Series
  - Houston Astros vs New York Yankees
    - Game 2: 5.59 million viewers
    - Game 3: 3.84 million viewers
    - Game 4: 5.86 million viewers
    - Game 5: 5.63 million viewers
    - Game 6: 7.47 million viewers
- 2020 National League Division Series
  - Los Angeles Dodgers vs San Diego Padres
    - Game 1: 1.49 million viewers
    - Game 2: 1.64 million viewers
  - Atlanta Braves vs Miami Marlins
    - Game 1: 1.30 million viewers
    - Game 3: 1.01 million viewers
- 2020 National League Championship Series
  - Los Angeles Dodgers vs Atlanta Braves
    - Game 2: 2.46 million viewers
    - Game 3: 2.09 million viewers
    - Game 4: 5.04 million viewers (also aired on Fox)
    - Game 5: 3.61 million viewers
    - Game 6: 4.28 million viewers
    - Game 7: 9.67 million viewers (also aired on Fox)
- 2021 American League Division Series
  - Tampa Bay Rays vs Boston Red Sox
    - Game 1: 2.70 million viewers
    - Game 2: 2.70 million viewers
    - Game 4: 3.47 million viewers
  - Houston Astros vs Chicago White Sox
    - Game 1: 2.06 million viewers
    - Game 4: 1.70 million viewers
- 2021 American League Championship Series
  - Houston Astros vs Boston Red Sox
    - Game 2: 5.7 million viewers (also aired on Fox)
    - Game 3: 4.1 million viewers
- 2022 National League Division Series
  - Los Angeles Dodgers vs San Diego Padres
    - Game 1: 2.43 million viewers
    - Game 2: 3.11 million viewers
    - Game 3: 4.10 million viewers
    - Game 4: 3.00 million viewers
  - Atlanta Braves vs Philadelphia Phillies
    - Game 3: 2.91 million viewers
    - Game 4: 2.79 million viewers
- 2022 National League Championship Series
  - Philadelphia Phillies vs San Diego Padres
    - Game 1: 4.10 million viewers
    - Game 2: 1.99 million viewers (4.96 million viewers with Fox and Fox Deportes included)
    - Game 3: 4.88 million viewers
    - Game 5: 3.61 million viewers
- 2023 American League Division Series
  - Texas Rangers vs Baltimore Orioles
    - Game 1: 1.94 million viewers
    - Game 2: 1.60 million viewers
  - Minnesota Twins vs Houston Astros
    - Game 1: 2.49 million viewers
    - Game 2: 2.28 million viewers
    - Game 4: 2.70 million viewers
- 2023 American League Championship Series
  - Texas Rangers vs Houston Astros
    - Game 2: 785 thousand viewers (4.46 million viewers with Fox and Fox Deportes included)
    - Game 3: 4.64 million viewers
    - Game 4: 3.66 million viewers
    - Game 5: 4.22 million viewers
    - Game 6: 4.77 million viewers
    - Game 7: 2.76 million viewers (6.92 million viewers with Fox and Fox Deportes included)
- 2024 National League Division Series
  - New York Mets vs Philadelphia Phillies
    - Game 2: 3.46 million viewers
    - Game 3: 3.79 million viewers
    - Game 4: 4.05 million viewers
  - San Diego Padres vs Los Angeles Dodgers
    - Game 2: 2.88 million viewers
    - Game 3: 3.44 million viewers
    - Game 4: 4.65 million viewers
- 2024 National League Championship Series
  - New York Mets vs Los Angeles Dodgers
    - Game 2: 1.15 million viewers (5.63 million viewers with Fox and Fox Deportes included)
    - Game 3: 5.88 million viewers
    - Game 4: 3.96 million viewers
    - Game 5: 4.32 million viewers
    - Game 6: 6.27 million viewers

=== 2023 World Baseball Classic ===
- Group A
  - Cuba vs Netherlands: 141 thousand viewers
  - Panama vs Italy: 139 thousand viewers
  - Czech Republic vs Korea: 85 thousand viewers
- Group B
  - Australia vs Korea: 134 thousand viewers
  - China vs Japan: 68 thousand viewers
- Group C
  - United States vs Colombia: 981 thousand viewers
  - Mexico vs United States: 791 thousand viewers
  - Canada vs United States: 721 thousand viewers
  - Great Britain vs Mexico: 395 thousand viewers
  - Great Britain vs Canada: 215 thousand viewers
- Group D
  - Puerto Rico vs Dominican Republic: 949 thousand viewers
  - Venezuela vs Puerto Rico: 599 thousand viewers
  - Dominican Republic vs Venezuela: 457 thousand viewers
  - Israel vs Puerto Rico: 394 thousand viewers
  - Israel vs Dominican Republic: 377 thousand viewers
- Quarterfinals
  - Puerto Rico vs Mexico: 792 thousand viewers
- Semifinals
  - Cuba vs United States: 1.95 million viewers
  - Japan vs Mexico: 1.89 million viewers
- Final
  - Japan vs United States: 4.48 million viewers

== Commentators and studio personalities ==
=== Current play-by-play commentators ===
- Joe Davis: Lead play-by-play
- Adam Amin: #2 play-by-play
- Kevin Kugler: alternate play-by-play
- Kenny Albert: alternate play-by-play
- Connor Onion: alternate play-by-play
- Eric Collins: alternate play-by-play
- Jeff Levering: alternate play-by-play

=== Current color commentators ===
- John Smoltz: Lead color
- A. J. Pierzynski: #2 color
- Eric Karros: alternate color
- Tom Verducci: alternate color
- Mark Sweeney: alternate color
- Dontrelle Willis: alternate color

=== Current field reporters ===
- Ken Rosenthal: Lead field reporter
- Tom Verducci: #2 field reporter

=== Current studio team ===
- Kevin Burkhardt: Lead studio host
- Chris Myers: Secondary studio host
- Matt Vasgersian: Secondary Postseason studio host
- Alex Rodriguez: Studio analyst
- David Ortiz: Studio analyst
- Derek Jeter: Studio analyst
- Dontrelle Willis: Studio analyst

== Other MLB related programming ==
As part of Fox Sports' new Major League Baseball broadcast deal, in April 2014, Fox Sports 1 premiered MLB Whiparound, an hour-long nightly baseball highlight program (similar in vein to ESPN's Baseball Tonight and MLB Network's MLB Tonight) featuring quick-turnaround highlights, and news and analysis from around the league (live look-ins of games being played in progress generally can not be shown on Whiparound, as MLB Tonight is reserved that right exclusively). It is hosted by Chris Myers, who is joined by one or two analysts rotating between Frank Thomas, Eric Karros, Dontrelle Willis. Although Whiparound airs most weeknights at 10 p.m., the Wednesday editions are usually delayed to 12 a.m. Eastern Time on weeks when Fox Sports 1 airs a sporting event in prime time during the MLB season (on weeks without predetermined programming conflicts, the program airs in its regular 10 p.m. slot).

Also in 2014, Fox Sports 1 began airing MLB 162 (the title being a reference to the total number of games each team plays during the Major League Baseball season), which was hosted by Julie Alexandria. In 2015, Fox Sports 1 began airing MLB's Best, a half-hour weekly show completely containing highlights of the best plays of the previous week in a countdown format, with no host or interviews.

== See also ==
- Fox Sports 1 § Programming
  - List of programs broadcast by Fox Sports 1

Records
Preceded by None	Major League Baseball pay television carrier 1990–present with ESPN (2014–present) with TBS (2014–present) with Apple TV+ (2022–present) with Peacock/NBCSN (2022–2023 and 2026–present) with Netflix (2026–present)	Succeeded by Incumbent
