= List of programs broadcast by Fox Sports 1 =

The following is a list of programs broadcast currently or formerly on Fox Sports 1, and occasionally on sister network Fox Sports 2.

== Currently broadcast by Fox Sports 1 ==
=== News / analysis programming ===
- NASCAR RaceDay (since 2013)
- MLB on FS1 (since 2014)
- MLS Soccer Sunday (since 2015)
- The Herd with Colin Cowherd (since 2015)
- First Things First (since 2017)
- Wake Up Barstool (since 2025)

=== Event coverage ===
Baseball

- Major League Baseball (2014–present)
  - 40 regular season MLB games (mostly on Saturdays)
  - Up to 15 post-season games (8 Divisional Series games and 1 best-of-seven League Championship Series)

Basketball

- BIG3 (2017–2018)
  - 8 regular season weeks totaling 32 games
  - Playoffs

Bowling

- PBA on Fox (since 2018)

Boxing

- Premier Boxing Champions (2015–2022)

College athletics

- NCAA football and basketball (2013–present)
  - Big East men's and women's basketball (2013–present)
  - Big 12 football and men's and women's basketball (2013–present)
  - Pac-12 football (2013–present)
  - Big Ten Conference (2017–present)
  - Holiday Bowl (2017–2019)

Futsal

- FIFA Futsal World Cup (exclusive coverage of the 2016, 2020 and 2024 FIFA Futsal World Cup)

Golf

- USGA Championships (2015–2019)
  - U.S. Open (2015–2019; live coverage of the first two rounds)
  - U.S. Senior Open (2015–2019; live coverage of the first two rounds)
  - Men's, Women's and Junior Amateur Championships (2015–2019)
  - Men's and Women's Four-Ball Championships (2015–2019)
- Franklin Templeton Shootout (2015–2016; live coverage of the first two rounds)

Horse racing

- Up to 10 graded stakes races (2014–present)
- 2 top stakes races (2014–present)

Mixed martial arts

- Ultimate Fighting Championship (2013–2018)
  - Approximately 18 live UFC events, primarily on Saturday nights (more rarely on Wednesdays and Sundays)
  - Live preliminary fights for UFC pay-per-view events on Saturday nights
  - The Ultimate Fighter reality television series and tournament, two seasons per year

Motorsports

- AMA Supercross Championship (2013–2018)
  - Coverage of the Monster Energy AMA Supercross Championship across FS1 and FS2 (2013–2018)
  - Coverage of the AMSOIL AMA Arenacross Championship across FS1 and FS2 (2013–2018)
  - Coverage of the Monster Energy Cup event (2013–2018)
- ARCA Racing Series presented by Menards (ten live ARCA races across FS1 and FS2)
- FIA Formula E Championship (2014–2021; coverage across Fox, FS1 and FS2)
- FIA World Endurance Championship (2013–2017)
  - 24 Hours of LeMans (2013–2017; coverage across FS1 and FS2)
- IMSA (2013–2018)
  - TUDOR United SportsCar Championship (2013–2018; coverage of the entire season across FS1 and FS2)
  - Continental Tire Sports Car Challenge (2013–2018 coverage of the entire season across FS1 and FS2)
- Monster Jam (2013–2018; coverage across FS1 and FS2)
- NASCAR (2013–present)
  - NASCAR Cup Series (2015–present; live coverage of 6 races, as well as practice and qualifying events for the first 17 Cup races)
  - NASCAR Xfinity Series (2015-2024; live coverage of 10 races, as well as practice and qualifying for the first 14 Xfinity Series races)
  - Craftsman Truck Series (2013–present; live coverage rights to all races including practice and qualifying races, with exception of the Fred's 250, which airs on FOX)
- MotoGP
- National Hot Rod Association (2016–present)
  - NHRA Mello Yello Drag Racing Series; coverage of Friday and Saturday qualifying, and Sunday eliminations
  - NHRA Lucas Oil Drag Racing Series; Select Sportsman eliminations
  - NHRA J&A Service Pro Mod Drag Racing Series
- High Limit Racing (2025-present; select races)

Soccer

- CONCACAF (2013–present)
  - CONCACAF Gold Cup (2014–present; select matches broadcast across FS1, FS2 and Fox Soccer Plus)
  - CONCACAF Champions League (2014–present; select matches broadcast across FS1, FS2 and Fox Soccer Plus)
- CONMEBOL (2013–present)
  - Copa Libertadores (2014–2018; select tournament matches)
- Copa América Centenario (2016)
- FA Cup (2014–2018; select tournament matches)
- FIFA World Cup (exclusive coverage of the 2018, 2022, and 2026 FIFA World Cup)
- FIFA Women's World Cup (exclusive coverage of the 2015, 2019, and 2023 FIFA Women's World Cup)
- German Bundesliga (2015–2021; all 306 league games via FS1, FS2 and Fox Soccer Plus)
  - DFL-Supercup (2015–2021)
  - Bundesliga relegation playoffs (2015–2021)
- Major League Soccer (2015–present; 34 regular season matches)
  - MLS All-Star Game (2015–2021; rights alternating with ESPN)
  - MLS Cup (in 2015-2022; rights alternating with ESPN, annually since 2023)
- UEFA (2013–2018)
  - UEFA Champions League (2015–2018; 146 league games across FS1, FS2 and Fox Soccer Plus; 2 live matches per week on FS1)
  - UEFA Europa League (2015–2018; 205 league games across FS1, FS2 and Fox Soccer Plus; 2 live matches per week on FS1)
- U.S. Men's National Soccer Team (2015–2022; rights to all matches shared with ESPN)

== Formerly broadcast by Fox Sports 1 ==
=== News/analysis programming ===
- America's Pregame (2014-2015)
- Breakfast Ball (2024-2025)
- The Carton Show (2022-2024)
- Fox NFL Kickoff (2013-2015)
- Fox Sports Live (2013-2017)
- Garbage Time with Katie Nolan (2015-2017)
- The Mike Francesa Show (2014-2015)
- MLB Whiparound (2014-2020)
- NASCAR Race Hub (2013–2024)
  - NASCAR All-Star Race (2014–2024)
  - NASCAR Victory Lane (2013-2017)
- Speak (2016-2025)
- UFC Tonight (2013–2018)
- Undisputed (2016-2024)

=== Event coverage ===
Basketball

- BIG3 (2017–2018)
  - 8 regular season weeks totaling 32 games
  - Playoffs

Boxing

- Premier Boxing Champions (2015–2022)

College athletics

  - Holiday Bowl (2017–2019)

Golf

- USGA Championships (2015–2019)
  - U.S. Open (2015–2019; live coverage of the first two rounds)
  - U.S. Senior Open (2015–2019; live coverage of the first two rounds)
  - Men's, Women's and Junior Amateur Championships (2015–2019)
  - Men's and Women's Four-Ball Championships (2015–2019)
- Franklin Templeton Shootout (2015–2016; live coverage of the first two rounds)

Mixed martial arts

- Ultimate Fighting Championship (2013–2018)
  - Approximately 18 live UFC events, primarily on Saturday nights (more rarely on Wednesdays and Sundays)
  - Live preliminary fights for UFC pay-per-view events on Saturday nights
  - Fox UFC
  - UFC Fight Night
  - UFC on Fuel TV
  - Fox UFC Saturday
  - The Ultimate Fighter reality television series and tournament, two seasons per year

Motorsports

- AMA Supercross Championship (2013–2018)
  - Coverage of the Monster Energy AMA Supercross Championship across FS1 and FS2 (2013–2018)
  - Coverage of the AMSOIL AMA Arenacross Championship across FS1 and FS2 (2013–2018)
  - Coverage of the Monster Energy Cup event (2013–2018)
- IMSA (2013–2018)
  - Rolex 24 Hours of Daytona (2014-2018)
  - Grand Am Rolex Sports Car Series (2013)
  - TUDOR United SportsCar Championship/Weathertech Sports Car Championship (2014–2018; coverage of the entire season across FS1 and FS2)
  - Continental Tire Sports Car Challenge (2013–2018 coverage of the entire season across FS1 and FS2)
- Monster Jam (2013–2018; coverage across FS1 and FS2)

Soccer

- UEFA (2013–2018)
  - UEFA Champions League (2015–2018; 146 league games across FS1, FS2 and Fox Soccer Plus; 2 live matches per week on FS1)
  - UEFA Europa League (2015–2018; 205 league games across FS1, FS2 and Fox Soccer Plus; 2 live matches per week on FS1)
- U.S. Men's National Soccer Team (2015–2022; rights to all matches shared with ESPN)

== See also ==
- Fox Sports
- Fox Sports 1
- Fox Sports 2
