= Carlos Correa =

Puerto Rican baseball player (born 1994)

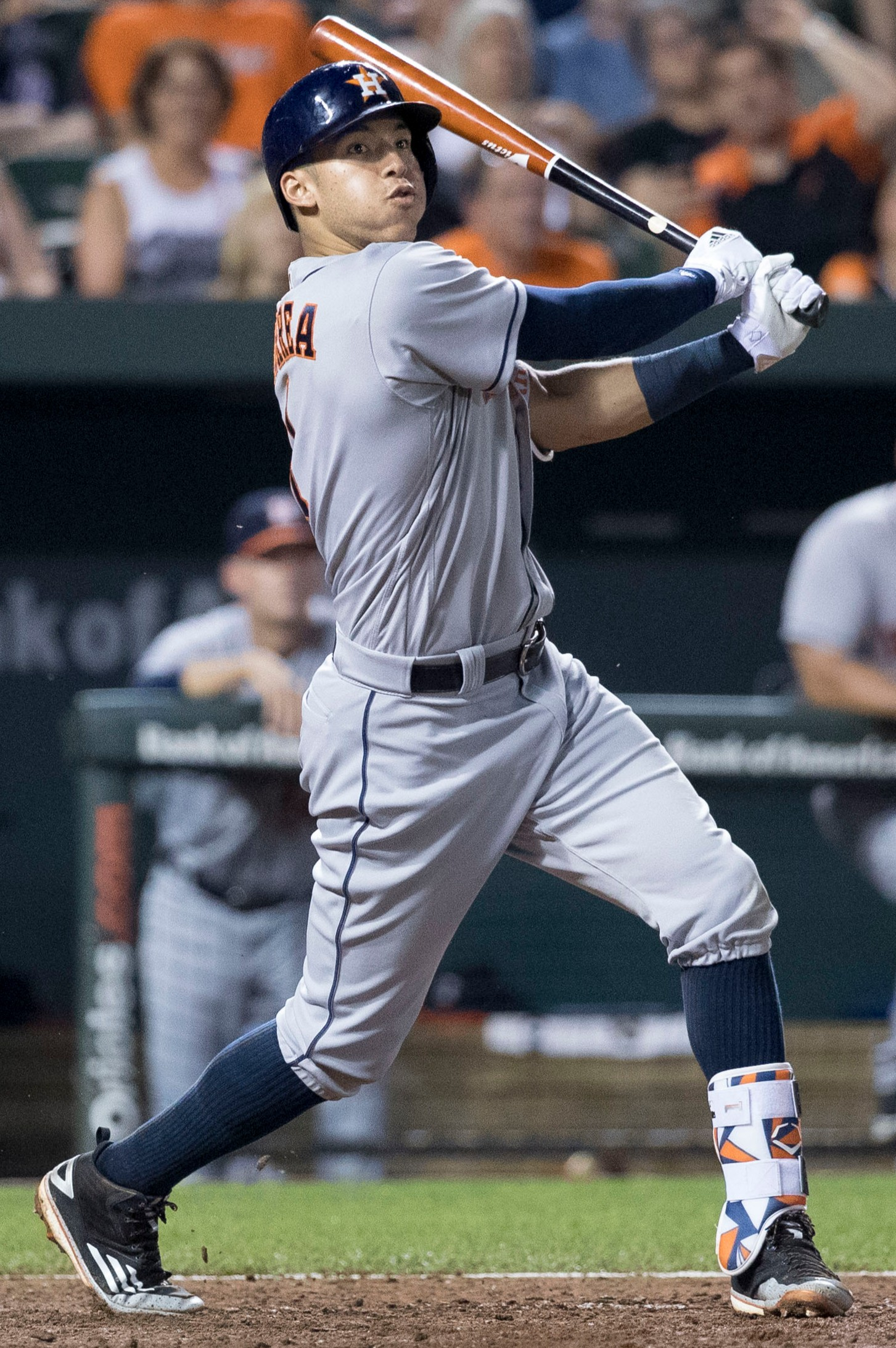
- Correa with the Houston Astros in 2016

Houston Astros – No. 1
- Shortstop / Third baseman
- Born: September 22, 1994 (age 32); Ponce, Puerto Rico
- Bats: Right Throws: Right

MLB debut
- June 8, 2015, for the Houston Astros

MLB statistics (through May 1, 2026)
- Batting average: .276
- Hits: 1,330
- Home runs: 203
- Runs batted in: 739
- Stats at Baseball Reference

Teams
- Houston Astros (2015–2021); Minnesota Twins (2022–2025); Houston Astros (2025–present)

Career highlights and awards
- 3× All-Star (2017, 2021, 2024); World Series champion (2017); AL Rookie of the Year (2015); Gold Glove Award (2021)
Medals
Men's baseball
Representing Puerto Rico
World Baseball Classic
Silver medal – second place	2017 Los Angeles	Team

Carlos Javier Correa Oppenheimer Jr. (born September 22, 1994) is a Puerto Rican professional baseball shortstop and third baseman for the Houston Astros of Major League Baseball (MLB). He has previously played in MLB for the Minnesota Twins. The Astros selected him first overall in the 2012 MLB draft.

Correa made his MLB debut with the Astros in 2015, and won the American League (AL) Rookie of the Year Award. In 2017, Correa appeared in the World Baseball Classic, won the AL Player of the Month Award for May, was named an MLB All-Star, and won the World Series. In 2021, he was named to his second All-Star Team and won the Gold Glove and Platinum Glove awards.

After seven seasons with Houston, he entered free agency and signed a three-year deal with the Twins which he later opted out of after his first season with the team. Following agreements with both the San Francisco Giants and New York Mets that fell apart due to failed physicals, Correa re-signed with the Twins. Minnesota traded him back to the Astros during the 2025 season.

== Early life and introduction to baseball ==
Correa was born in Ponce, Puerto Rico, to Carlos Correa Sr. and Sandybel Oppenheimer. Although the family's income was low, they had enough money to build a small house in Barrio Velázquez, a fishing village located in Santa Isabel, Puerto Rico, where Correa was raised. From an early age, Correa often played catch in an alley adjacent to his home, which prompted a neighbor to suggest enrolling him in a youth league, the parent-pitch category, when he was five years old. Correa was assigned to play as a first baseman due to his hitting ability, while his father continued training him every day during their free time. In 1998, Hurricane Georges caused heavy damage to the family's house. This forced his father to take several odd jobs, but he continued training Correa Jr. on a daily basis.

When he was seven years old, Correa was performing solidly in Santa Isabel's Playita Cortada American Baseball Congress affiliate, hitting up to 150 home runs. When the team was eliminated, the league's champion, Rio Grande, recruited Correa to play in the championship series held in Atlanta. However, the distance between Santa Isabel and the municipality of Rio Grande made this difficult for the family. His mother worked as well, but when this was not enough, she began selling food. The citizens of Santa Isabel began helping them organize charity games and his original team donated their sales income to help pay for the travel. Correa was Rio Grande's pitcher and was named the tournament's Most Valuable Player after striking out eight batters in a team comeback. By the time that he was 11 years old, the family was traveling to the municipality of Caguas to have him practice with higher-level teams. Correa was also an honor student and received a scholarship to attend Raham Baptist Academy.

Three years later, the family moved from Barrio Velázquez due to recurrent floods, but kept close ties with those who stayed behind. Joined by his brother, Jean Carlos, in baseball practices, the family once again was forced to work more odd jobs. Soon after, the Puerto Rico Baseball Academy and High School (PRBAHS) brought Correa in as a scholarship student. His discipline and talent prompted his coaches to work extra hours to improve his bat and they helped by offering transportation when the family's car was totaled in an accident. In 2010, Correa participated in the Perfect Game BCS Finals and the WWBA PG Underclassman World Championships. After attending one of these Perfect Game events, Correa made adjustments to his batting swing with his hitting coach, José Rivera. The following year he appeared at the 2011 PG BCS Under-18 Finals and East Coast Professional Showcase. However, it was Correa's performance at the 2011 PG World and National Showcases that promoted him to the top of his class, earning him a spot in the Aflac-PG All-American Game, where he was named Rawlings' Defensive Player of the Year. He closed the year with an appearance in the PG WBAA World Championships.

Correa opened 2012 by being selected the MVP in the Víctor Pellot Excellence Tournament, following an extraordinary performance for a shortstop that included a two-home run game. At the 2012 PG World Showcase, he established a PG record with a 97-miles per hour throw across the infield. After graduating from the PRBAHS, Correa signed a letter of commitment with the University of Miami. Besides competing for the PRBAHS, Correa was also a member of Team Mizuno and the Puerto Rico National Baseball Team that participated in the youth Pan-American tournament.

== Professional career ==
=== Draft and minor leagues ===
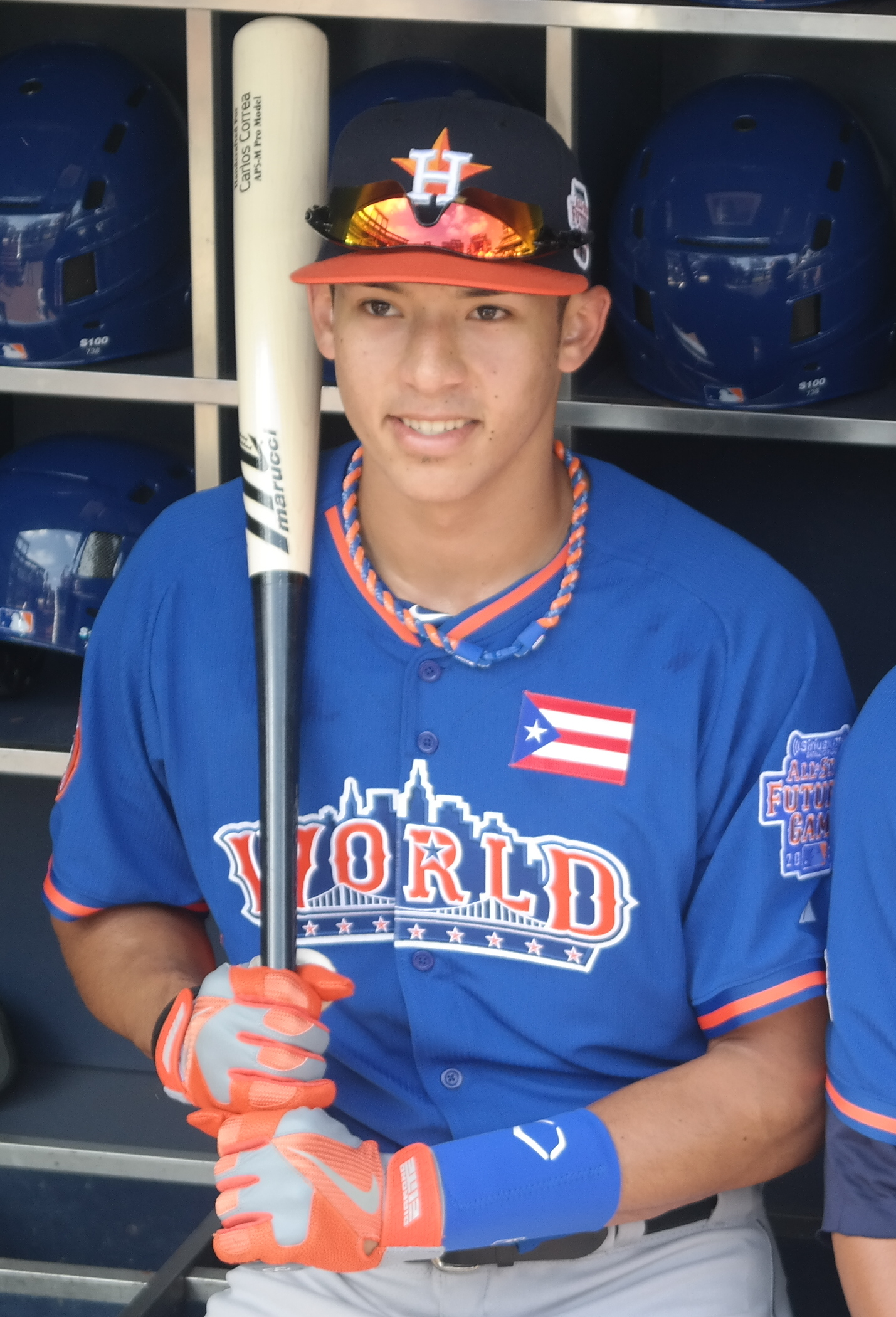
Correa at the 2013 Futures Game

Despite being the youngest high-profile player to enter the 2012 Major League Baseball draft, in the months leading up to the event the 17-year-old Correa was already projected as a top-ten pick by several major sources, including Sports Illustrated and ESPN. His stock rose during the month before the draft, with outstanding performances in team workouts, including one that reportedly left the Houston Astros' scouts "blown away".

On June 4, 2012, the Astros selected him as the first overall pick, ahead of the projected top pick, pitcher Mark Appel. Correa was incredulous, only saying that he must have been dreaming, after entering the stage while hoisting the flag of Puerto Rico. With his selection, Correa became the highest-selected player to be drafted directly from a Puerto Rican high school, besting Ramón Castro's 17th pick in 1994, while joining several other top-10 Puerto Rican picks such as Francisco Lindor and Javier Báez, all of whom had moved to the mainland United States to complete their high school or college education after developing in the local youth leagues. Correa became the third Latino to be the first overall selection in the MLB Draft, after Alex Rodriguez and Adrián González, as well as the first Puerto Rican and Latin American-born player to do so. During the ceremony, he was congratulated by Puerto Rican great Iván Rodríguez. Upon returning to Puerto Rico the following day, Correa was greeted by a victory parade in his native Santa Isabel, which was attended by hundreds of people.

Correa signed with the Astros on June 7, 2012, agreeing to a $4.8 million signing bonus. He chose to wear the number 12 in his introduction to the media, donning it in homage to Hall of Famer Roberto Alomar, but abandoned it afterwards. The organization assigned him to their extended spring training team in Kissimmee, Florida. He began his professional career with the Gulf Coast Astros of the Rookie-level Gulf Coast League, and was promoted to Greeneville Astros of the Rookie-level Appalachian League, and batted a combined .258/.305/.400 in 190 at bats. He opened the 2013 season with the Quad City River Bandits of the Class A Midwest League.

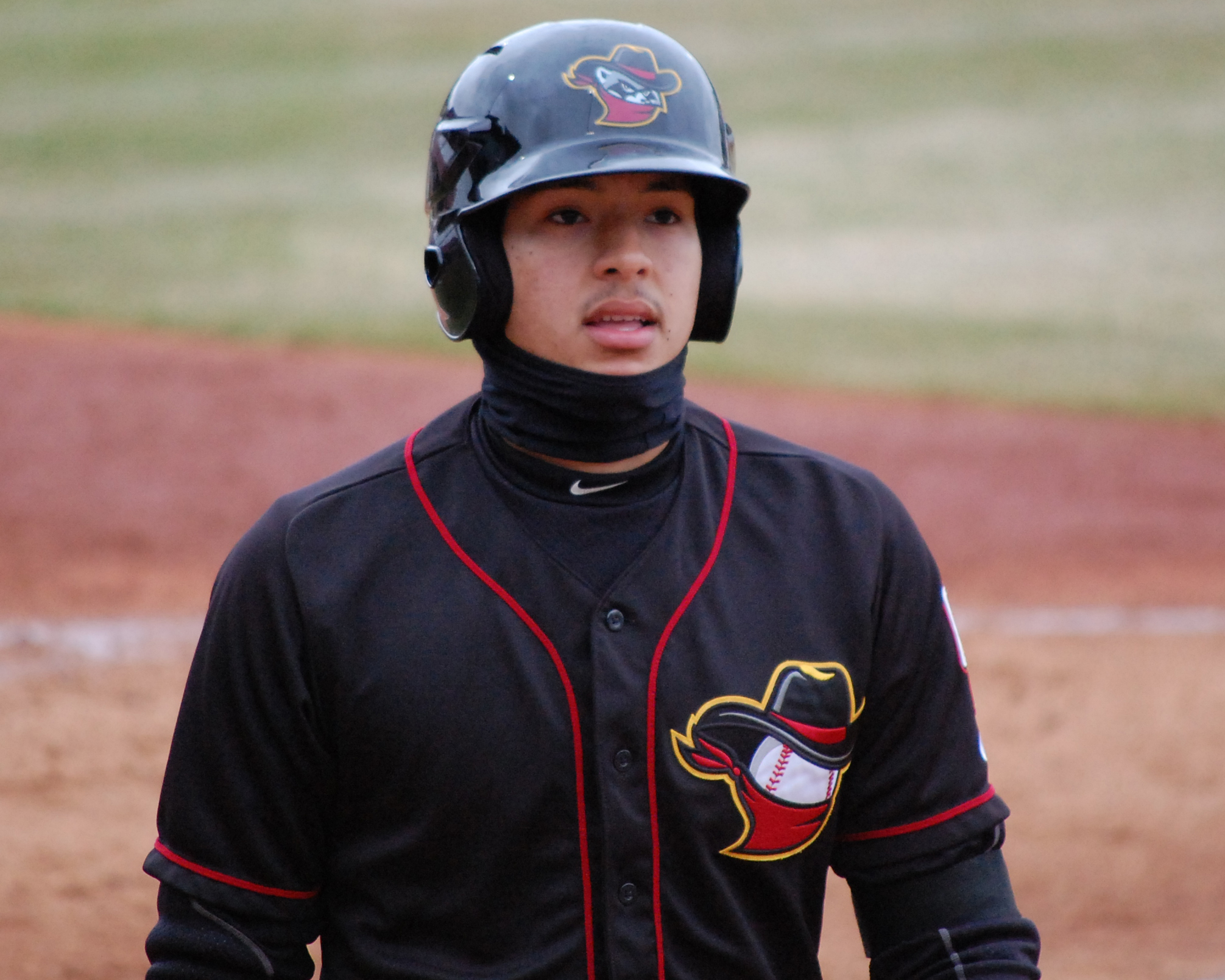
Correa playing for Quad Cities in 2013

Correa was ranked the top prospect in the Astros' farm system prior to the 2013 season and opened the year on a ten-game hitting streak that was halted by injury. He was selected the team's Player of the Month during this run and became the youngest player selected to play in the 2013 Midwest League All-Star Game, where he represented the Western Division All-Stars. Correa became the first player in the history of the All-Star Futures Game to be selected by popular vote to complete the World Team. He also became the first position player in the River Bandits' history to be selected in his first year with the team. The youngest player in the event, Correa entered the game as a defensive backup in the eighth inning. Despite not having an official at-bat, his pre-game batting practice was scouted as impressive, including some home runs that reached the second deck of Citi Field.

When Mark Appel joined the River Bandits in July, this marked the first time that two consecutive first overall draft picks played for the same minor league team. For the 2013 season, Correa batted .320/.405/.467 in 450 at bats. After the team prevented him from playing for Gigantes de Carolina in Puerto Rico, Correa began a training camp to improve his physique and add speed, which lasted from October to February.

On January 14, 2014, the Astros invited Correa to spring training as a non-roster player. They assigned him to the Lancaster JetHawks of the Class A-Advanced California League to start the 2014 season. On June 21, Correa fractured his right fibula, requiring surgery on the fibula and a ligament that ended his season. He batted .325/.416/.510 in 249 at bats over 62 games for Lancaster.

The Astros invited Correa to spring training in 2015, and assigned him to minor league camp in late March to prepare for an assignment with the Corpus Christi Hooks of the Class AA Texas League. After Correa hit .385/.459/.727 in 117 at bats over 29 games for Corpus Christi, the Astros promoted him to the Fresno Grizzlies of the Class AAA Pacific Coast League on May 11. In 24 games with the Grizzlies, he hit .276/.345/.449 in 98 at bats with three home runs and 12 runs batted in (RBIs).

=== Houston Astros (2015–2021) ===
==== 2015: AL Rookie of the Year ====
On June 8, 2015, the Astros promoted Correa to the major leagues. He debuted in a 3–1 loss to the Chicago White Sox, going 1-for-4 with a RBI single off of Chris Sale. On June 9, Correa stole his first career base and hit his first MLB home run off of Zach Duke. By stealing three bases in his ninth game, he became the second-youngest player to do so in a century, only trailing Rickey Henderson by 21 days. Correa established a new franchise record for most hits during his first ten games by batting 14. He went on to also break the franchise record for most hits through 15 career games with 20. Correa set a franchise record for most doubles during his first 20 games, batting 9. Five home runs were also hit during this timeframe for a total of 14 extra-base hits, tied for the second-most since the 1993 MLB expansion. Correa also tied two other players by reaching base safely in 18 of these games. He won the American League's Rookie of the Month award for June.

On July 5, 2015, Correa became the first player since 1914 to record five games with a minimum of three hits and a home run in 25 plate appearances since his debut. By his 42nd game he was leading the American League in home runs by shortstops. This game was also Correa's seventh with at least three hits, a record for rookies in this league. By hitting nine home runs during this timeframe, he also became the first shortstop in a century to accomplish this in his first 42 games. On August 1, Correa recorded his first multi-homer game, also setting a franchise record by hitting 12 home runs in his first 46 games. By his 50th game he had batted more home runs in that number of games than any other shortstop in history, recording four more than the previous record-holder. On August 19, Correa delivered his first walk-off hit with a single off Tampa Bay Rays pitcher Matt Andriese.

On October 12, 2015, Correa became the youngest shortstop to hit a home run in playoff competition, as well as the second youngest player to record a postseason multi-homer game.

For the 2015 season with Houston, he batted .279/.345/.512 in 387 at bats. He had the 7th-best Power-Speed # in the American League, at 17.1. Playing 99 games at shortstop, he had a fielding percentage of .967.

Following the conclusion of the season, Correa was selected as the Sporting News AL Rookie of Year. At the 2015 Players Choice Awards he received the AL Outstanding Rookie Award. On November 16, 2015, MLB and the Baseball Writers' Association of America (BBWAA) recognized Correa as the AL Rookie of the Year. He became the first Astro to win a Rookie of the Year award since Jeff Bagwell did in 1991.

==== 2016 ====
Correa began the 2016 season by becoming the youngest player in the Astros' history to hit a home run on Opening Day. He missed playing time in September due to a shoulder injury. Correa ended the season with a .274 batting average, a .361 on-base percentage, a .451 slugging percentage, 36 doubles (10th in the AL), 20 home runs, and 96 RBIs in 577 at bats. He hit one ball with an exit velocity of 118.2 mph; the only major leaguer to hit a ball harder in 2016 was Giancarlo Stanton. Baseball-Reference.com calculated that Correa's 2016 season was worth 5.9 wins above replacement. He had four walk-off hits during the season, the most in MLB.

==== 2017: World Series championship and first All-Star selection ====
For May 2017, Correa was named the AL Player of the Month. He delivered a career-best five consecutive multiple-hit games from May 25–29, and totaled 14 such games on the month. In 26 games, he batted .386, eight doubles, seven home runs, 26 RBI and a 1.130 OPS. His batting average and RBI total led the AL, on-base percentage ranked third, hits and OPS fifth, and slugging tied for sixth. He was selected to play in his first MLB All-Star Game, held at Marlins Park in Miami. On July 18, it was revealed that he had suffered a torn ligament in his left thumb. He was ruled out for six to eight weeks.

For the 2017 regular season, Correa batted .315/.391/.550 in 422 at bats with 24 home runs and 84 RBIs. At shortstop, he had a .978 fielding percentage. Correa was recognized by the Houston chapter of the Baseball Writers' Association of America (BBWAA) as the recipient of the Darryl Kile Good Guy Award.

On October 6, 2017, Correa hit his first home run of the 2017 postseason against the Boston Red Sox in Game 2 of the American League Division Series. Two days later, he would hit his second home run of the postseason. On October 14, he hit his third home run of the post season including a walk-off double leading the Astros to their second win of the ALCS series against the Yankees. Correa and the Astros offense slumped as they lost all three middle games at Yankee Stadium. The Astros won Game 7 by a score of 4–0, advancing to their second World Series in franchise history, to face the National League pennant-winning Los Angeles Dodgers. In Game 2, Correa, along with two Astros teammates–Jose Altuve and George Springer—and two Dodgers players–Charlie Culberson and Yasiel Puig—all homered in extra innings as the Astros prevailed, 7–6. The five home runs accounted for the most hit in extra innings of any single game in major league history.

Correa went 3-for-5 in Game 5 including an RBI double and one of the five home runs by the Astros helping them beat the Dodgers 13–12. His effort helped setting the new record of most total home runs in a World Series. The game lasted over five hours, becoming the second-longest World Series game in history. The Astros won the World Series in Game 7 giving them their first title in franchise history.

Three years later, it was revealed in the Houston Astros sign stealing scandal that the Astros had broken MLB rules during their championship season. The team was punished with a $5 million fine and the loss of top draft picks in 2020 and 2021. Correa admitted that his team illegally stole signs to gain an advantage and apologized, saying "We were wrong for everything we did in 2017. It's not what we stand for. It's not what we want to portray as an organization, and we were definitely wrong about all that and we feel really sorry. We affected careers, we affected the game in some way, and looking back at it, it was just bad."

==== 2018 ====
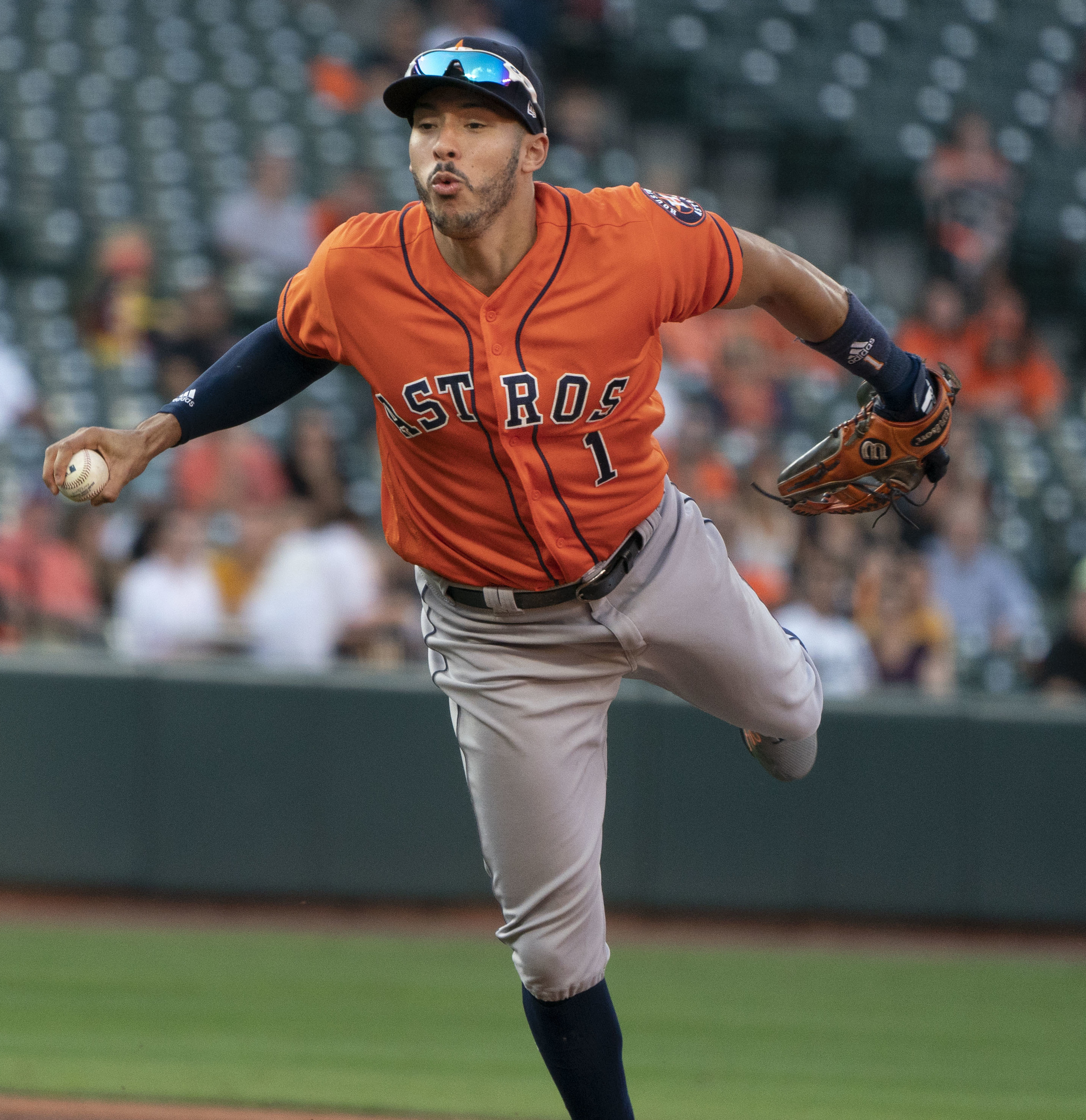
Correa with the Astros in 2018

On June 28, 2018, Correa was placed on the 10-day disabled list due to back ailment. He was activated from the 10-day disabled list on August 10. On November 10, he underwent surgery to fix a deviated septum, which caused breathing problems while running the bases. In 2018 he batted .239/.323/.405 in 408 at bats with 15 home runs, 65 RBIs, and 11 sacrifice flies (leading the AL), and was 10th in the league in double plays grounded into (17). On defense, he was second in the league with a .984 fielding percentage at shortstop.

==== 2019 ====
Correa missed Opening Day in 2019 due to neck stiffness. On April 3, in a game against the Texas Rangers, he got the 500th hit of his career. Correa was placed on the injured list on May 29 after suffering a rib fracture during a massage at home. On July 12, he was transferred to the 60-day injured list; he was later activated on July 26. On August 15, Correa hit his 100th career home runs in 7–6 loss to the Athletics at Oakland Coliseum. He joined Cal Ripken Jr. and Alex Rodriguez as the only major league shortstops to hit 100 career home runs before their 25th birthday. He was also the youngest Astro to hit the milestone home run. For the regular season, Correa slashed .279/.358/.568 with 21 home runs and 59 RBIs in 280 at bats. On October 13, he hit a walk-off home run in the 11th inning of the second game of the ALCS against the New York Yankees to tie the series at 1–1.

==== 2020 ====
In 2020, Correa batted .264/.326/.383 with five home runs and 25 RBIs in 201 at bats. Opposing defenses began to deploy the infield shift in nearly 20% of his plate appearances in 2020, whereas, in previous years, shifts were rarely used when he batted. He led AL shortstops with a fielding percentage of .995.

On October 15, in Game 5 of the ALCS, Correa hit a walk-off home run in the 9th inning against the Tampa Bay Rays to force Game 6 of the series. He became only the third player, after David Ortiz and Bernie Williams, to have hit multiple postseason walk-off home runs.

==== 2021: Platinum Glove Award and second All-Star selection ====
On July 4, 2021, Correa was named a reserve to the MLB All-Star Game, his second career selection. He ranked fifth in the AL in OPS (.926) at the time. On September 21, Correa scored his 100th run on the season. He became the first Astro shortstop to ever score 100 runs in a season. Opposing teams continued to deploy shifts when Correa was batting, but he neutralized the strategy, significantly improving his results.

In 2021, Correa batted .279/.366(9th in the AL)/.485 with 104 runs (7th), 26 home runs, and 92 RBIs, and grounded into 16 double plays (10th). He appeared in 148 games, his most since 2016. He established career highs in home runs, with 104 runs scored, and with 269 total bases, and tied his career high with 75 walks. On defense, Correa led the AL with +21 defensive runs saved (DRS) and ranked third among shortstops with 579 total chances, 384 assists and a .981 fielding percentage. Following the regular season, he was awarded both of his first career Gold Glove and AL Platinum Glove Awards in a season in which the Astros were also named the AL Gold Glove Team. The Houston chapter of the Baseball Writers' Association of America (BBWAA) named Correa the Astros' team Most Valuable Player, his first such award. He also won his first Fielding Bible Award and was named a Sporting News AL All-Star at shortstop.

On October 12, Correa moved into sixth all-time in postseason runs batted in (RBI) with 54 (tied with Albert Pujols) with his two-run single in Game 4 of the ALDS versus the Chicago White Sox. In Game 6 of the World Series, Correa made his 73rd postseason start as part of the infield unit of Jose Altuve, Alex Bregman, and Yuli Gurriel, which was more postseason starts by any quartet of teammates in major league history, surpassing the Yankees' Derek Jeter, Tino Martinez, Paul O’Neill, and Bernie Williams, with 68 postseason contests started together. On November 3, 2021, Correa was declared a free agent for the first time in his career. The Astros extended Correa a qualifying offer, valued at $18.4 million for one year, which he rejected.

=== Minnesota Twins (2022–2025) ===
==== 2022 season ====
On March 22, 2022, Correa signed a three-year contract worth $105.3 million with the Minnesota Twins. The contract included opt-out provisions after the first and second seasons. The $35.1 million average annual salary became the highest for an infielder, topping Anthony Rendon's $35 million annual salary, and was the fourth-highest salary in the AL. He joined center fielder Byron Buxton on the Twins, making them the third pair of players picked first and second in the same draft to then play for one club.

The trio of Luis Arráez, Buxton, and Correa each hit consecutive home runs off former Astros teammate Gerrit Cole to open the bottom of the first inning in a contest versus the New York Yankees on June 9, 2022. Correa completed a 3–6 triple play in the fourth inning on August 22, when Texas Rangers batter Nathaniel Lowe lined out to first baseman José Miranda. Miranda then doubled Corey Seager on the first base bag and threw to Correa to put out Marcus Semien at second base. On August 23, Correa returned to Minute Maid Park for his first game as a visitor to play against the Astros and received a standing ovation and video tribute. He singled in the seventh inning off reliever Ryne Stanek to end an Astros' no-hitter started by Justin Verlander.

In the 2022 season, he batted .291/.366/.467 in 522 at bats with 70 runs, 22 home runs, and 64 RBIs. On defense, he had a league-leading .983 fielding percentage.

==== 2022–23 offseason ====
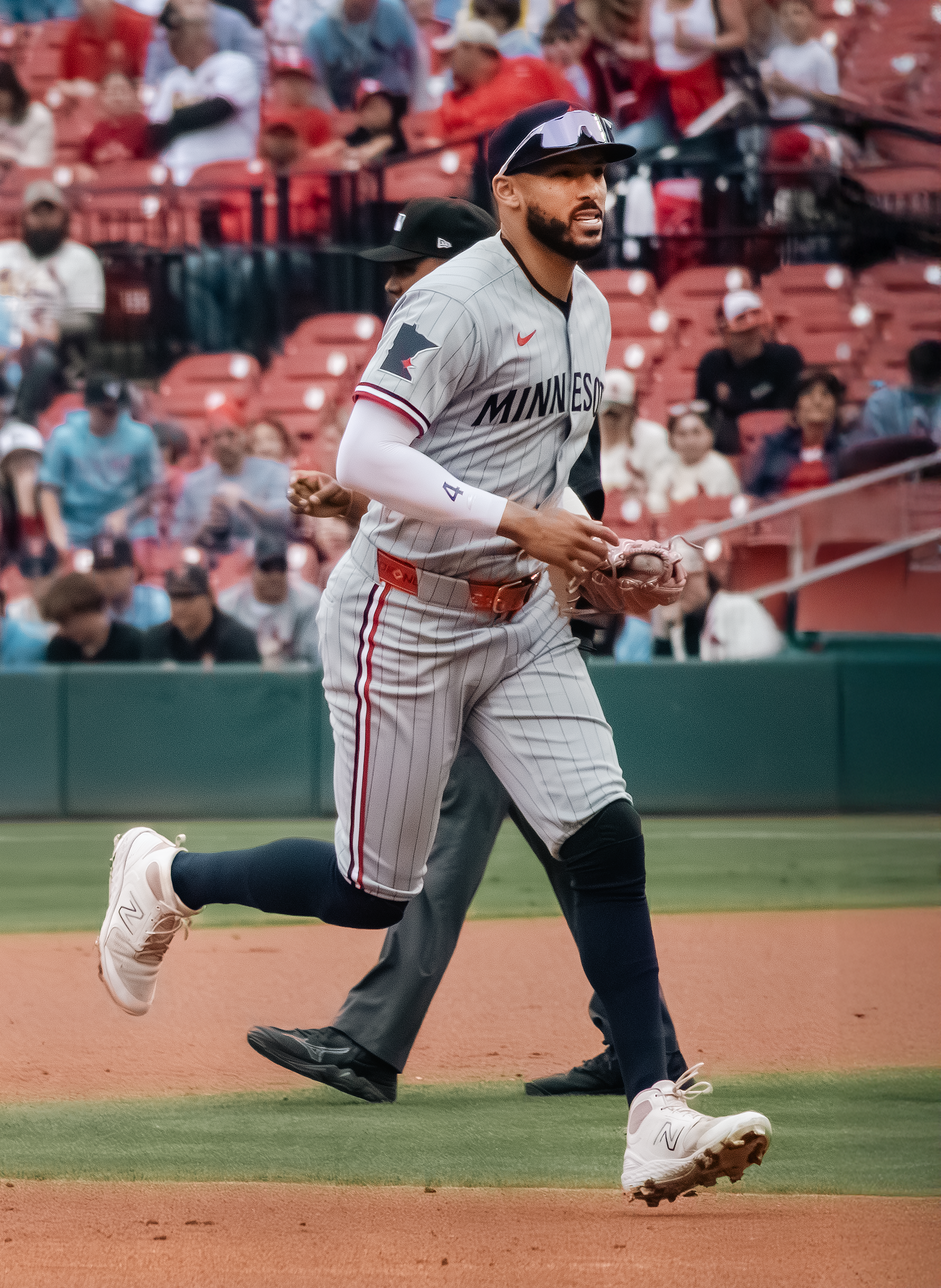
Correa with the Twins in 2025

On November 2, 2022, Correa opted out of the final two seasons of his contract and became a free agent.

On December 15, Correa and the San Francisco Giants agreed to a 13-year contract worth $350 million. A press conference scheduled for December 20 to introduce Correa as a Giant at Oracle Park was cancelled three hours before it was to begin as the Giants found an issue with Correa's physical exam. The Giants were reportedly concerned with the long term health of Correa's right ankle, which he had surgically repaired after an injury back in 2014. Subsequently, the deal fell through, and Correa remained a free agent. Later, Correa's agent, Scott Boras, reached out to other teams and reached an agreement with the New York Mets on a 12-year contract worth $315 million. However, the Mets also had concerns with Correa's ankle from their physical exam, and this deal also fell through.

Later, Boras re-engaged with the Twins. On January 11, 2023, Correa re-signed with the Twins for six years and $200 million plus vesting options that could increase the value of the deal to $270 million.

==== 2023 season ====
In 2023, Correa batted .230/.312/.399, which were all career lows. He also grounded into double plays a league-leading and career high 30 times.

The Twins won the American League Central division title. During the 2023 postseason, Correa drove in the go-ahead run during Game 2 of the Wild Card Series against the Toronto Blue Jays and in the same game tagged out Vladimir Guerrero Jr. in a pickoff attempt by Sonny Gray. This allowed the Twins to win their first playoff game since 2004 and their first playoff series since 2002. They would go on to lose against Correa's former team, the Houston Astros in the 2023 ALDS 3–1.

==== 2024 season ====
The first half of the 2024 season saw a return to form for Correa, as he hit to a .305 batting average with an .884 OPS through June, and was selected for his third All-Star Game, and first since joining the Twins. On July 12, Correa was moved to the injury list after suffering from right plantar fasciitis. The recovery took two months, and he did not return to the Twins until mid-September.

Across 86 games, Correa batted .310/.388/.517 with 55 runs, 14 home runs, and 54 RBI in 2024.

==== 2025 season ====
In 93 appearances for the Twins, Correa batted .267/.319/.386 with 40 runs, seven home runs, and 31 RBI in 2025.

=== Houston Astros (2025–present) ===
On July 31, 2025, the Twins traded Correa to the Astros in exchange for prospect Matt Mikulski. The Twins agreed to send $33 million to the Astros to help cover the remaining $104 million on Correa's contract. Correa started at third base for the first time in the major leagues against the Boston Red Sox on August 1 at Fenway Park, as his successor as Houston's starting shortstop, Jeremy Peña, was the incumbent. On September 10, Correa hits his 200th career home run off Blue Jays pitcher José Berríos in a 3-2 victory over the Toronto Blue Jays. He made 51 appearances down the stretch for the Astros, slashing .290/.355/.430 with six home runs and 21 RBI.

On May 5, 2026, Correa suffered a significant injury to his left ankle that was revealed to be a torn tendon, which required surgery and ended his season. In 32 appearances for Houston, he had batted .279/.369/.418 with three home runs, 16 RBI, and one stolen base.

== Fielding ==
Correa working out before a game in 2025

As a taller shortstop at 6 feet 4 inches (1.93 m) and 220 pounds (100 kg), he relies on footwork and a more upright ready position for fielding the ball. He also utilizes a one-handed pickup to leverage his long arms and range. He also uses a jump hop when throwing to first base while fading towards third base.

== International career ==
Correa played for Puerto Rico in the 2017 World Baseball Classic. With Francisco Lindor playing shortstop and Javier Baez as the team's second baseman, Correa played as Puerto Rico's third baseman. Correa batted .333 during the tournament, with three home runs, nine RBIs, 10 runs scored, and two stolen bases, including a home run in the semifinals. Following the conclusion of the tournament, he was named to the 2017 All-World Baseball Classic team. Correa opted to not play in the 2023 World Baseball Classic in anticipation of the birth of his second child.

== Personal life ==
After winning the 2017 World Series, Correa proposed to his girlfriend, Miss Texas USA 2016 Daniella Rodriguez, while they were being interviewed by Ken Rosenthal on national television. They have two dogs, named Groot and Rocket. Correa and Rodriguez were married in a courthouse ceremony on November 11, 2019. Correa and Rodriguez announced on Instagram in June 2021 that they were expecting their first child. Their son was born on November 29, 2021. In October 2022, Correa and Rodriguez announced on Instagram that they were expecting their second child. Their second child, a boy, was born on March 11, 2023.

During his time with the Astros, Correa made his home in Houston all year round. His residence was in the Montrose area. He has a younger brother, Jean Carlos Correa, whom the Astros selected in the 2018 MLB draft.

He is involved in charity work, including helping children in Houston after Hurricane Harvey and his hometown in Puerto Rico after Hurricane Maria damaged the island in 2017. In March 2020, Correa donated $500,000 in medical equipment to help the city of Houston during the COVID-19 pandemic.

== Awards ==
Awards won by Carlos Correa
Award	Category	Result / Section	Year	Ref.
All-Star Futures Game selection			2013	
American League (AL) Rookie of the Month		June	2015	
Darryl Kile Award			2017	
Houston Astros Most Valuable Player (MVP)			2021	
Players Choice Award	Outstanding Rookie		2015	
Premios Juventud	Deportista de Alto Voltaje	Won	2016	
Sporting News	AL All-Star	Shortstop	2021	
Sporting News	AL Rookie of the Year		2015	

== See also ==
- Houston Astros award winners and league leaders
- List of Major League Baseball players from Puerto Rico
- List of people from Ponce, Puerto Rico

Awards and achievements
Preceded by Mike Trout	American League Player of the Month; May 2017	Succeeded by Aaron Judge
