= Kevin Kugler =

American sportscaster

Kevin Kugler (born August 1972) is an American sportscaster who works in both radio and television. Kugler is currently employed on television by Fox Sports for NFL, college basketball (including on Big Ten Network), MLB and UFL games. On radio, Kugler is employed by Westwood One as its lead college basketball voice as well as a part of its NFL coverage.

Kugler is based in Omaha, Nebraska, where he hosted a daily sports talk show on KOZN until 2012 when he left to focus on his other duties. He won the Nebraska Sportscaster of the Year award nine times.

== Westwood One ==
Kugler has worked for Westwood One's sports broadcasting arm since 2004. That year, he began covering the College World Series for Westwood One and continues to do so to this day. He also was the network's lead voice for NCAA football broadcasts until 2009.

Upon the death of Harry Kalas, Kugler was promoted to Westwood One's NFL broadcasts to take his place alongside color analyst and former Pittsburgh Steelers quarterback Mark Malone. The two have worked together since the 2009 season. Beginning in 2012, Kugler is the primary substitute announcer for Dial Global's Sunday night coverage, replacing Howard David as Dave Sims' substitute when Sims' Seattle Mariners broadcasting duties keep him away from the booth. Kugler and Sims switched assignments in 2013, with Kugler taking over Sunday Night Football alongside analyst James Lofton. In 2016, Kugler substituted for Kevin Harlan on two Monday Night Football games during that year's season.

In 2008, Kugler replaced Harlan as Westwood One's lead play-by-play voice for the Final Four and has called the games ever since alongside John Thompson and Bill Raftery.

In 2025, Kugler replaced Ian Eagle as the radio voice of Thursday Night Football, while Eagle has been named the lead announcer of NBA on Prime Video.

== Other duties ==
In 2011, Kugler joined the Big Ten Network as a commentator for football and basketball, among other sports. He also joined former Jacksonville Jaguars and Houston Texans offensive lineman (and Dial Global colleague) Tony Boselli as the preseason television broadcast team for the Jaguars. He also calls The Masters golf for Dial Global. He served as an anchor and called play-by-play for Basketball at the 2012 Summer Olympics for Dial Global. In addition to the Big Ten Network, Kugler will also do play-by-play for Fox College Hoops. For the 2013-14 college basketball season, Kugler served as the number two play-by-play man for the Big Ten Network and called first round games for the 2014 Big Ten Men's Basketball Tournament for the BTN alongside Stephen Bardo.

Kugler was joined by Matt Millen on college football Saturdays in the fall of 2015 as part of BTN's lead team covering college football.

On June 5, 2018, Kugler served as the play-by-play man for an MLB on Fox game between the Miami Marlins and St. Louis Cardinals. He would later fill in on Fox's coverage of a Week 8 NFL game between the Seattle Seahawks and Detroit Lions for Thom Brennaman, who took the place of Joe Buck while the latter called the World Series.

Kugler’s role with Fox expanded just before the 2020 season, as he was promoted to regular play-by-play announcer after Brennaman resigned when he made homophobic comments on air during a Cincinnati Reds game. Kugler continued to make appearances on college basketball broadcasts, and fill-in on select MLB games. In December 2022, he got the assignment as the play-by-play announcer at the NFL game between the Miami Dolphins and the Buffalo Bills on NFL Network.

== Personal life ==
Kugler is a 1994 graduate of the University of Nebraska–Lincoln College of Journalism and Mass Communications.
