= 2017 American League Championship Series =

48th edition of Major League Baseball's American League Championship Series

Team (Wins)	Managers	Season
Houston Astros (4)	A. J. Hinch	101–61 (.623), GA: 21
New York Yankees (3)	Joe Girardi	91–71 (.562), GB: 2
- Dates: October 13–21
- MVP: Justin Verlander (Houston)
- Umpires: Mark Carlson (Games 3–7), Gary Cederstrom (crew chief), Chad Fairchild (Games 1–2), Chris Guccione, Jerry Meals, Jim Reynolds, Hunter Wendelstedt

Broadcast
- Television: FS1 (Games 1, 3–7); Fox (Game 2)
- TV announcers: Joe Buck, John Smoltz, Ken Rosenthal and Tom Verducci
- Radio: ESPN
- Radio announcers: Jon Sciambi and Chris Singleton
- ALDS: New York Yankees over Cleveland Indians (3–2); Houston Astros over Boston Red Sox (3–1)

The 2017 American League Championship Series was a best-of-seven playoff pitting the Houston Astros against the New York Yankees for the American League pennant and the right to face the Los Angeles Dodgers in the 2017 World Series. The Astros defeated the Yankees in seven games after falling behind three games to two. The home team won every game in the series.

This was the first time in history that the ALCS and NLCS teams were from the four most populous U.S. cities: New York, Los Angeles, Chicago, and Houston.

For the first time, Major League Baseball sold presenting sponsorships to all of its postseason series; this ALCS was sponsored by Camping World and was officially known as the American League Championship Series presented by Camping World.

The Astros went on to defeat the Los Angeles Dodgers in the World Series in seven games, winning their first World Series championship in franchise history, however, the title was tainted after it was discovered that the Astros had a complex sign stealing system in place during the season.

== Background ==
The Astros defeated the Boston Red Sox 3–1 in the 2017 American League Division Series (ALDS). This is the Astros' fifth appearance in a League Championship Series, and their first since transferring from the National League to the American League. Their only previous LCS win came in the 2005 National League Championship Series; they lost in 1980, 1986, and 2004. They are also the first AL West team to make it to the ALCS since 2011.

The Yankees upset the heavily favored Cleveland Indians 3–2 in the ALDS to advance. This is the Yankees' 16th appearance in the ALCS, and their second as a Wild Card. Their last ALCS appearance came in the 2012 American League Championship Series where they got swept by the Detroit Tigers. They had won in 11 of their previous 15 appearances. This is the sixth straight year in which an AL East team has made it to the ALCS.

This was the second postseason match-up between these two teams, with the Astros defeating the Yankees in the 2015 American League Wild Card Game at Yankee Stadium. This was also the first ALCS to not feature any American League Central Division teams since 2010.

== Summary ==
Houston won the series, 4–3.

Game	Date	Score	Location	Time	Attendance
1	October 13	New York Yankees – 1, Houston Astros – 2	Minute Maid Park	3:20	43,116
2	October 14	New York Yankees – 1, Houston Astros – 2	Minute Maid Park	3:00	43,193
3	October 16	Houston Astros – 1, New York Yankees – 8	Yankee Stadium	3:25	49,373
4	October 17	Houston Astros – 4, New York Yankees – 6	Yankee Stadium	3:37	48,804
5	October 18	Houston Astros – 0, New York Yankees – 5	Yankee Stadium	3:18	49,647
6	October 20	New York Yankees – 1, Houston Astros – 7	Minute Maid Park	3:23	43,179
7	October 21	New York Yankees – 0, Houston Astros – 4	Minute Maid Park	3:09	43,201

== Game summaries ==
=== Game 1 ===
October 13, 2017 7:10 pm (CDT) at Minute Maid Park in Houston, Texas, 73 °F (23 °C), roof closed
Team	1	2	3	4	5	6	7	8	9	R	H	E
New York	0	0	0	0	0	0	0	0	1	1	5	0
Houston	0	0	0	2	0	0	0	0	X	2	6	1
WP: Dallas Keuchel (1–0) LP: Masahiro Tanaka (0–1) Sv: Ken Giles (1); Home runs: NYY: Greg Bird (1); HOU: None; Attendance: 43,116; Boxscore

In a pitcher's duel, Dallas Keuchel and Masahiro Tanaka allowed no runs through the first three innings before the Astros scored in the bottom of the fourth. Jose Altuve hit an infield single and stole second base, before Carlos Correa drove him in with an RBI single. Yuli Gurriel drove in Correa to give the Astros a 2–0 lead. Keuchel recorded ten strikeouts, allowing four hits and no runs in seven innings. Tanaka pitched six innings with three strikeouts and allowed two earned runs. Chad Green relieved Tanaka and threw two scoreless innings. Ken Giles was brought in with one out in the eighth for a five-out save. He struck out four of six but allowed a home run to Greg Bird before striking out Jacoby Ellsbury swinging to end the game. It was his second save of this postseason.

=== Game 2 ===
October 14, 2017 3:09 pm (CDT) at Minute Maid Park in Houston, Texas, 73 °F (23 °C), roof closed
Team	1	2	3	4	5	6	7	8	9	R	H	E
New York	0	0	0	0	1	0	0	0	0	1	5	0
Houston	0	0	0	1	0	0	0	0	1	2	5	0
WP: Justin Verlander (1–0) LP: Aroldis Chapman (0–1); Home runs: NYY: None; HOU: Carlos Correa (1); Attendance: 43,193; Boxscore

Justin Verlander threw a complete game, allowing one run and five hits while striking out 13. Carlos Correa opened the scoring in the fourth inning with a home run off of starter Luis Severino that barely scraped over the right field wall. It was reviewed for fan interference, as a child reached his glove over the wall in an attempt to catch it. Todd Frazier answered for the Yankees in the fifth with an RBI ground-rule double that was lodged in the center-field fence after a two-out double by Aaron Hicks. In the bottom of the ninth, Jose Altuve singled with one out off of Aroldis Chapman. Correa hit a walk-off double to right field, as Gary Sanchez did not field the ball cleanly at home plate and Altuve scored the winning run, giving the Astros a 2–0 series lead heading to New York.

=== Game 3 ===
October 16, 2017 8:09 pm (EDT) at Yankee Stadium in The Bronx, New York, 57 °F (14 °C), partly cloudy
Team	1	2	3	4	5	6	7	8	9	R	H	E
Houston	0	0	0	0	0	0	0	0	1	1	4	0
New York	0	3	0	5	0	0	0	0	X	8	7	1
WP: CC Sabathia (1–0) LP: Charlie Morton (0–1); Home runs: HOU: None; NYY: Todd Frazier (1), Aaron Judge (1); Attendance: 49,373; Boxscore

In the bottom of the second inning, Todd Frazier opened the scoring with a three-run home run after two two-out singles off of Charlie Morton. The Yankees piled on five more runs in the fourth inning. After a leadoff ground-rule double and two-out walk, Chase Headley's RBI single made it 4–0 Yankees. A hit-by-pitch to Brett Gardner loaded the bases before Morton was relieved by Will Harris, who threw a wild pitch to let Frazier score before a three-run home run by Aaron Judge made it 8–0. CC Sabathia did not allow a run in six innings pitched, striking out five. In the top of the ninth inning, Dellin Betances entered in relief only to walk the first two batters before getting pulled for Tommy Kahnle. A single by Cameron Maybin loaded the bases, then one out later, walk to Alex Bregman forced in a run, but Jose Altuve hit into the game-ending double play as the Yankees' won Game 3 8–1.

=== Game 4 ===
October 17, 2017 5:08 pm (EDT) at Yankee Stadium in The Bronx, New York, 61 °F (16 °C), clear
Team	1	2	3	4	5	6	7	8	9	R	H	E
Houston	0	0	0	0	0	3	1	0	0	4	3	0
New York	0	0	0	0	0	0	2	4	X	6	8	3
WP: Chad Green (1–0) LP: Ken Giles (0–1) Sv: Aroldis Chapman (1); Home runs: HOU: None; NYY: Aaron Judge (2); Attendance: 48,804; Boxscore

Game 4 began as a pitcher's duel. The Yankees' Sonny Gray threw five scoreless innings, allowing only one hit while Astros' Lance McCullers Jr. threw six shutout innings with one hit. With the bases loaded in the top of the sixth on two walks and a catcher's interference call, Yuli Gurriel cleared them with a double off of David Robertson to put the Astros up 3–0. The next inning, a Starlin Castro fielding error allowed Marwin González, who doubled, to score, increasing the lead to 4–0. In the bottom of the seventh, Aaron Judge hit a home run, chasing McCullers from the game. Chris Devenski entered in relief only to allow a triple to Didi Gregorius and a sacrifice fly to Gary Sánchez, cutting the lead to 4–2. In the bottom of the eighth, Todd Frazier and Chase Headley both singled, with the latter tripping on his way to second base and evading Jose Altuve's close tag to remain safe at second. As Ken Giles entered the game, a Brett Gardner groundout made the score 4–3 before Judge doubled into left field, tying the game at 4–4. Gregorius singled and Sánchez doubled in two runs to complete the Yankees comeback, now up 6–4. Aroldis Chapman entered in the top of the ninth inning, pitching a 1-2-3 inning to get his first save of the series and third this postseason as the Yankees rallied to tie the series at two games all.

=== Game 5 ===
October 18, 2017 at Yankee Stadium in The Bronx, New York, 74 °F (23 °C), clear
Team	1	2	3	4	5	6	7	8	9	R	H	E
Houston	0	0	0	0	0	0	0	0	0	0	4	1
New York	0	1	1	0	2	0	1	0	X	5	10	1
WP: Masahiro Tanaka (1–1) LP: Dallas Keuchel (1–1); Home runs: HOU: None; NYY: Gary Sánchez (1); Attendance: 49,647; Boxscore

In the top of the second inning, Yuli Gurriel hit a leadoff double, but was stranded with three consecutive groundouts. In the bottom half of that inning, Starlin Castro hit a two-out double and was driven in by Greg Bird's single. Next inning Chase Headley hit a leadoff single and scored on Aaron Judge's one-out double. In the fifth, after a single and walk, back-to-back two-out RBI singles by Gary Sanchez and Didi Gregorius made it 4–0 and knock starter Dallas Keuchel out of the game. Gary Sánchez provided insurance with a home run in the bottom of the seventh inning off of Brad Peacock. Masahiro Tanaka pitched seven shutout innings and Tommy Kahnle pitched two innings to close. The Yankees were now one win away from the World Series.

=== Game 6 ===
October 20, 2017 7:09 pm (CDT) at Minute Maid Park in Houston, Texas, 73 °F (23 °C), roof closed
Team	1	2	3	4	5	6	7	8	9	R	H	E
New York	0	0	0	0	0	0	0	1	0	1	6	1
Houston	0	0	0	0	3	0	0	4	X	7	8	0
WP: Justin Verlander (2–0) LP: Luis Severino (0–1); Home runs: NYY: Aaron Judge (3); HOU: Jose Altuve (1); Attendance: 43,179; Boxscore

Facing elimination, Justin Verlander threw seven shutout innings for the Astros, striking out eight. The Astros struck first in the bottom of the fifth off of Luis Severino. After two walks, Brian McCann drove in the first run with a double, then another walk loaded the bases before Jose Altuve's two-run single put Houston on the board 3–0. In the top of the eighth, Aaron Judge hit a home run to cut the lead to 3–1, but the Astros increased their lead in the bottom of the inning, starting with an Altuve lead off home run off of David Robertson. The solo HR by Judge was the final run the Yankees scored in the series. After a double and single, Alex Bregman's two-run double made it 6–1. One out later Evan Gattis's sacrifice fly off of Dellin Betances made it 7–1 Astros. Ken Giles pitched a scoreless ninth as the Astros forced the first LCS Game 7 in either league since 2012. This was Houston's third ever win in a game facing elimination in a postseason series and the first since the 2015 American League Wild Card Game.

=== Game 7 ===
October 21, 2017 7:08 pm (CDT) at Minute Maid Park in Houston, Texas, 73 °F (23 °C), roof closed
Team	1	2	3	4	5	6	7	8	9	R	H	E
New York	0	0	0	0	0	0	0	0	0	0	3	0
Houston	0	0	0	1	3	0	0	0	X	4	10	0
WP: Charlie Morton (1–1) LP: CC Sabathia (1–1) Sv: Lance McCullers Jr. (1); Home runs: NYY: None; HOU: Evan Gattis (1), Jose Altuve (2); Attendance: 43,201; Boxscore

In the winner-take-all game to decide the AL pennant winner, Aaron Judge made a leaping catch to rob Yuli Gurriel of a solo homer in the bottom of the second inning. CC Sabathia allowed the first run of the game on a home run to Evan Gattis in the fourth, In the next inning, Tommy Kahnle entered the game in relief for the Yankees, but gave up a home run to Jose Altuve to make the lead 2–0. Two singles later, former Yankee Brian McCann lined a double to extend the Astros lead to four. For the Astros, Charlie Morton pitched five innings, allowed one walk and struck out five. Lance McCullers Jr. entered in relief, pitching four scoreless innings to close out the game and earn his first career save. McCullers ended the game throwing 24 straight curveballs; a Greg Bird flyout to George Springer was the final out of the game, sending the Astros to the 2017 World Series.

The Astros advanced to their first World Series in 12 years, becoming the first team to win pennants in both leagues. Houston's victory made this just the fifth best-of-seven series (following the 1987, 1991, and 2001 World Series, and the 2004 National League Championship Series which the Astros played in), and the first ALCS, in which the home team won all seven games.

=== Composite line score ===
2017 ALCS (4–3): Houston Astros beat New York Yankees.

Team	1	2	3	4	5	6	7	8	9	R	H	E
New York Yankees	0	4	1	5	3	0	3	5	1	22	45	6
Houston Astros	0	0	0	4	6	3	1	4	2	20	40	2
Total attendance: 320,513 Average attendance: 45,788

== Aftermath ==
After the 2019 season, former Houston Astros pitcher Mike Fiers alleged that the 2017 Astros used technology to illicitly steal their opponents' signs and relay it to their hitters. MLB opened an investigation into this sign stealing allegation and found the Astros used technology to cheat during their 2017 championship season and parts of 2018, as well. MLB suspended A. J. Hinch and Astros' general manager Jeff Luhnow for one year; the Astros fired Luhnow and Hinch the same day. Alex Cora, who was the Astros bench coach in 2017 and the Red Sox manager in 2018–2019, was also suspended for the 2020 season, but in a separate investigation of that team, and parted ways with that team a day after the Astros sanctions were announced. Carlos Beltrán (who had played for the Yankees from 2014 to 2016 before joining Houston) was the only player called out by name for his role in the scandal, who was quoted as saying that they were "behind the times" on signs. As such, Beltran, who had been hired as Mets manager in the 2019 offseason, came to a mutual agreement with the Mets to part ways. Yankees star player Aaron Judge said that the Astros should be forced to vacate their title and that the players involved should have been punished. On their 2017 World Series championship, he said: "I just don't think it holds any value with me. You cheated and you didn't earn it." In 2022, Yankees general manager Brian Cashman stated he believes the Yankees would have won it all in 2017, if not for the Astros 'illegal' and 'horrific' sign stealing scandal. Astros owner Jim Crane responded by calling his comments odd (as the Yankees were found to have done their own scheme in 2015), adding, "There’s the letter, and you were doing it, too. You were there dude. What are you talking about?".

Game 7 was Joe Girardi's final game as Yankees manager as five days after the game, the Yankees announced he would not return for the 2018 season. He was replaced by former Yankee Aaron Boone. After serving as an analyst for MLB Network for a few years, Girardi served as the Philadelphia Phillies manager from 2020 until he was fired midseason in 2022.

2017 Astros reserve outfielder Cameron Maybin joined the Yankees as a free agent in 2019 and reportedly tipped off Yankees about the Astros' sign-stealing before 2019 AL Championship Series match-up between the two teams. Nevertheless, the Astros proceeded to win their third playoff series versus the Yankees when they beat them again in the ALCS in six games. In the series, Jose Altuve became just the fifth player to hit a walk-off pennant-winning homer in the LCS-era (1969–present), which sealed the dubious distinction of the 2010s being the first decade of the Yankees not making a World Series appearance in a century. In 2021, the Astros won the pennant again after reaching the ALCS for the fifth straight year, becoming just the third team to ever reach the LCS five times in a row. Coincidentally, they beat the Boston Red Sox, managed by Cora. The following season, Houston beat New York again in the 2022 AL Championship Series, via a four-game sweep.

Carlos Beltrán, the only player named in the commissioner's report for his role in the Astros sign-stealing scandal, was hired by the Yankee's YES Network as a game analyst before the 2022 season. Beltrán again apologized for his role in the scandal during spring training, stating the Astros "crossed the line".
