= 2019 American League Championship Series =

MLB Playoff matchup between the Houston Astros and New York Yankees

Team (Wins)	Managers	Season
Houston Astros (4)	A. J. Hinch	107–55 (.660), GA: 10
New York Yankees (2)	Aaron Boone	103–59 (.636), GA: 7
- Dates: October 12–19
- MVP: Jose Altuve (Houston)
- Umpires: Dan Bellino, Cory Blaser, Mark Carlson, Kerwin Danley, Mike Everitt (crew chief, Games 4–6), (Note: Nelson sustained a concussion during Game 3 and was replaced by Everitt for the remaining games.) Marvin Hudson, (Note: During the postseason, there are seven umpires to a crew. One umpire is designated as the replay official and is assigned to MLB's New York office with replay officials for the first two games of the series. At the first travel day, the replay official umpire is assigned to the field for the remainder of the series and one umpire from those games is reassigned to replay official. Hudson was the Game 1 and Game 2 replay official, while Welke was the replay official for the remaining games.) Jeff Nelson (crew chief, Games 1–3), Bill Welke

Broadcast
- Television: Fox (Game 1); FS1 (Games 2–6)
- TV announcers: Joe Buck (Games 1–3, 5–6), Joe Davis (Game 4), John Smoltz, Ken Rosenthal and Tom Verducci
- Radio: ESPN
- Radio announcers: Dan Shulman, Chris Singleton and Buster Olney
- ALDS: Houston Astros over Tampa Bay Rays (3–2); New York Yankees over Minnesota Twins (3–0)

The 2019 American League Championship Series was a best-of-seven series between the two winners of the 2019 American League Division Series, the Houston Astros and New York Yankees, for the American League (AL) pennant and the right to play in the 2019 World Series. The Astros defeated the Yankees in six games, advancing to face the 2019 National League champions, the Washington Nationals, whom they lost to in seven games.

The series was played in a 2–3–2 format, with the Astros, having the better regular season record, hosting the first two and last two (if necessary) games. The series was the 50th in league history, (Note: The ALCS was first played in 1969; the 10th series was 1978 and the 20th series was 1988. As there was no postseason in 1994 due to a work stoppage, the 30th series was 1999 and the 40th series was 2009, making 2019 the 50th series.) with Fox/FS1 televising all games in the United States.

For the third straight year, Major League Baseball sold presenting sponsorships to all of its postseason series; as with the NLCS, this ALCS was sponsored by GEICO and officially known as the 2019 American League Championship Series presented by GEICO.

== Background ==
The best-of-five American League Division Series were scheduled for October 4–10.

The top-seeded Houston Astros won their first two games against the Tampa Bay Rays, winner of the American League Wild Card Game. The Rays won the next two games to force a deciding Game 5, which Houston won to advance to their third straight ALCS; each game of the series was won by the home team. Houston was 1–1 in prior ALCS appearances. When they competed in the National League, Houston was 1–3 in NLCS appearances.

The second-seeded New York Yankees swept their series against the third-seeded Minnesota Twins to clinch their 17th ALCS appearance. New York was 11–5 in prior ALCS appearances.

This series was a sequel to the 2017 ALCS, which the Astros won in seven games, and the third overall postseason meeting between the two teams. The Astros and Yankees faced each other seven times during the 2019 regular season, with the Astros winning four of those games.

== Summary ==
Houston won the series, 4–2.

Game	Date	Score	Location	Time	Attendance
1	October 12	New York Yankees – 7, Houston Astros – 0	Minute Maid Park	3:11	43,311
2	October 13	New York Yankees – 2, Houston Astros – 3 (11)	Minute Maid Park	4:49	43,359
3	October 15	Houston Astros – 4, New York Yankees – 1	Yankee Stadium	3:44	48,998
4	October 17	Houston Astros – 8, New York Yankees – 3	Yankee Stadium	4:19	49,067
5	October 18	Houston Astros – 1, New York Yankees – 4	Yankee Stadium	2:59	48,483
6	October 19	New York Yankees – 4, Houston Astros – 6	Minute Maid Park	4:09	43,357

== Game summaries ==
=== Game 1 ===
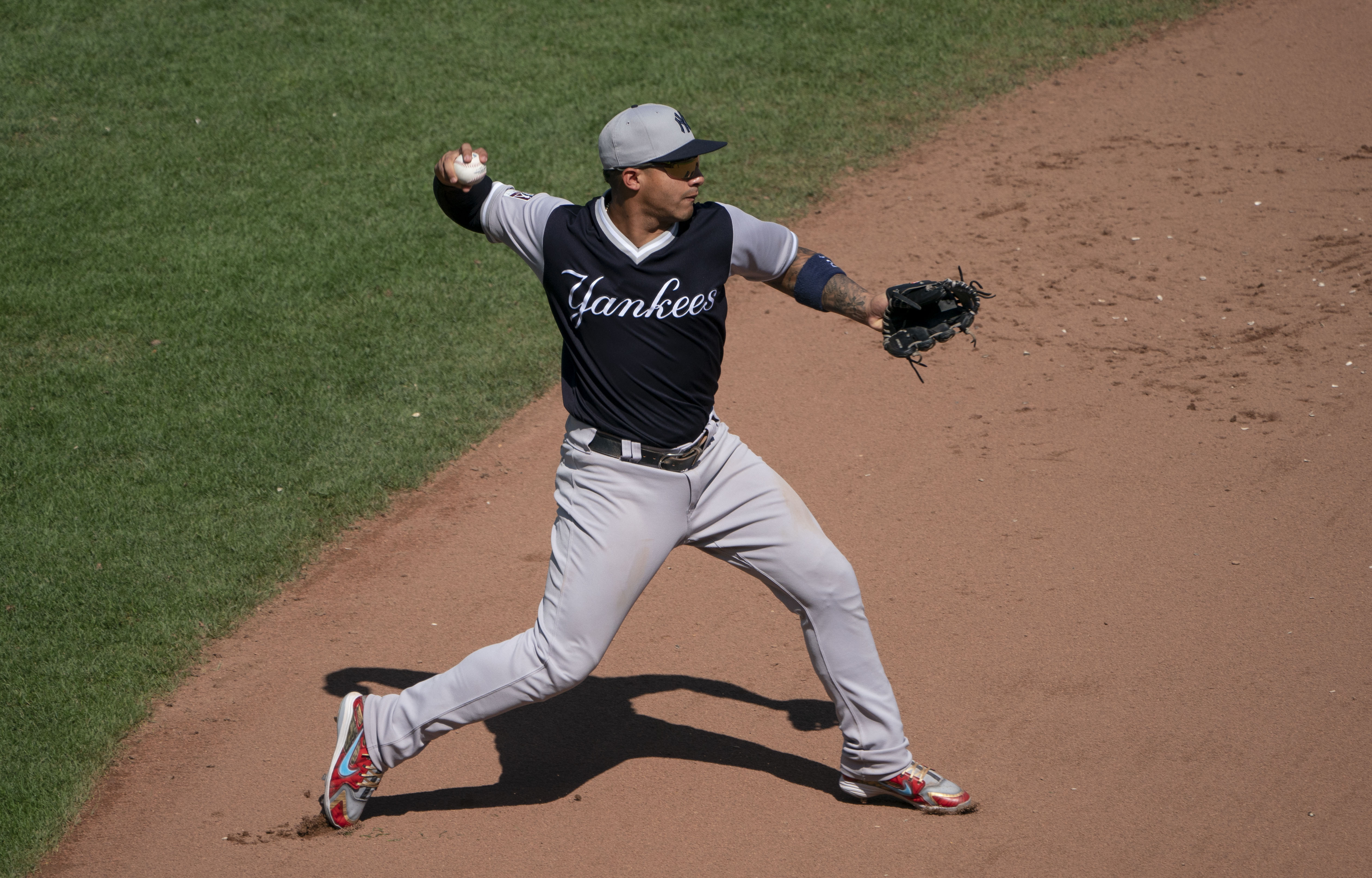
Gleyber Torres was 3-for-5 with 5 RBIs in Game 1.

Saturday, October 12, 2019 7:08 pm (CDT) at Minute Maid Park in Houston, Texas, 73 °F (23 °C), roof closed
Team	1	2	3	4	5	6	7	8	9	R	H	E
New York	0	0	0	1	0	2	2	0	2	7	13	0
Houston	0	0	0	0	0	0	0	0	0	0	3	1
WP: Masahiro Tanaka (1–0) LP: Zack Greinke (0–1); Home runs: NYY: Gleyber Torres (1), Giancarlo Stanton (1), Gio Urshela (1); HOU: None; Attendance: 43,311; Boxscore

Game 1 starting pitchers were Masahiro Tanaka for the Yankees and Zack Greinke for the Astros. The Yankees scored first with Gleyber Torres driving in DJ LeMahieu in the top of the fourth inning. They added two runs in the top of the sixth, on home runs by Torres and Giancarlo Stanton, and added two more runs in the top of the seventh, via four consecutive two-out singles, with Torres collecting two more RBIs. In the top of the ninth, the Yankees extended their lead to 7–0, via a leadoff homer by Gio Urshela and another RBI by Torres, this one coming on a fielder's choice, as LeMahieu scored from third on a groundout. Jonathan Loáisiga concluded matters, pitching the bottom of the ninth, with the game ending on a Michael Brantley fly out to Cameron Maybin as the Yankees took a 1–0 series lead. Tanaka earned the win, allowing just one hit while striking out four and facing the minimum in his six innings (18 batters). Greinke was charged with the loss, allowing three runs on seven hits in six innings while striking out six.

=== Game 2 ===
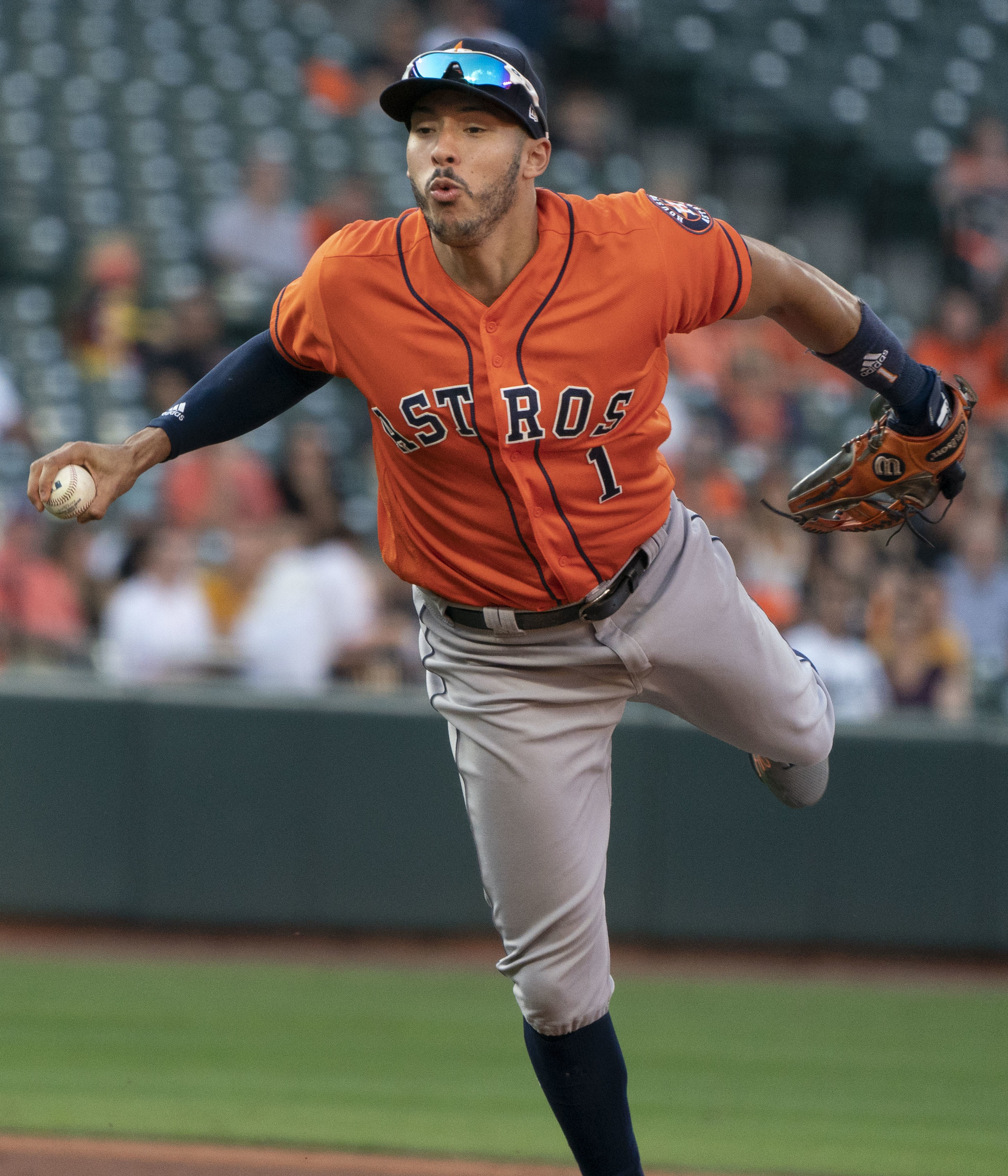
Carlos Correa hit a walk-off home run in Game 2, tying the series at one game all.

Sunday, October 13, 2019 7:08 pm (CDT) at Minute Maid Park in Houston, Texas, 73 °F (23 °C), roof closed
Team	1	2	3	4	5	6	7	8	9	10	11	R	H	E
New York	0	0	0	2	0	0	0	0	0	0	0	2	6	0
Houston	0	1	0	0	1	0	0	0	0	0	1	3	7	0
WP: Josh James (1–0) LP: J. A. Happ (0–1); Home runs: NYY: Aaron Judge (1); HOU: George Springer (1), Carlos Correa (1); Attendance: 43,359; Boxscore

Game 2 starting pitchers were James Paxton for New York and Justin Verlander for Houston. Houston scored first, as Carlos Correa doubled in Alex Bregman who had singled to lead off the bottom of the second inning. Yankees manager Aaron Boone removed Paxton after 2 1/3 innings—Paxton had allowed one run on four hits while striking out three. The Yankees took a 2–1 lead in the fourth, with Aaron Judge homering after DJ LeMahieu had walked. Houston tied the game in the fifth, on a home run by George Springer. Verlander departed after 6 2/3 innings, having allowed two runs on five hits while striking out seven. With no further scoring through regulation, the game went to extra innings. After a scoreless tenth inning, Correa led off the 11th with a home run off J. A. Happ to give the Astros a 3–2 win and tie the series at 1, going into Yankee Stadium for the next three games.

=== Game 3 ===
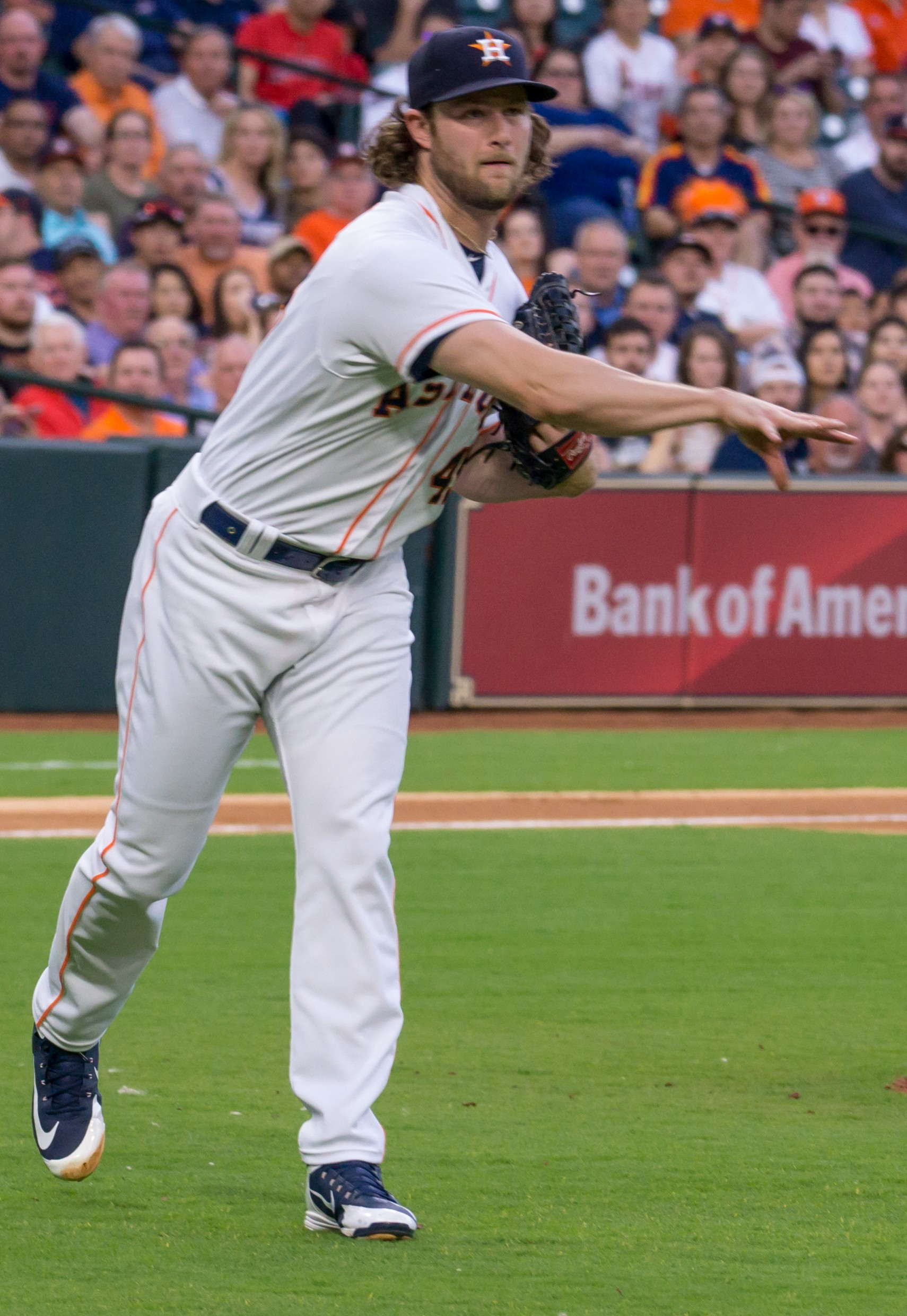
Gerrit Cole pitched seven shutout innings in Game 3.

Tuesday, October 15, 2019 4:08 pm (EDT) at Yankee Stadium in Bronx, New York, 64 °F (18 °C), sunny, wind 4 mph out to LF
Team	1	2	3	4	5	6	7	8	9	R	H	E
Houston	1	1	0	0	0	0	2	0	0	4	7	0
New York	0	0	0	0	0	0	0	1	0	1	5	1
WP: Gerrit Cole (1–0) LP: Luis Severino (0–1) Sv: Roberto Osuna (1); Home runs: HOU: Jose Altuve (1), Josh Reddick (1); NYY: Gleyber Torres (2); Attendance: 48,998; Boxscore

Game 3 starting pitchers were Gerrit Cole for the Astros and Luis Severino for the Yankees. The Astros scored first on a home run by Jose Altuve in the first inning. Josh Reddick followed with another homer in the second. The game was delayed by 20 minutes before the top of the fifth inning, as home plate umpire Jeff Nelson had to leave the game, due to the effects of being hit by a foul ball during the top of the fourth inning; Kerwin Danley, who had been the second base umpire, took over behind the plate. Severino left the game in the fifth inning after allowing two runs on five hits, walking three and striking out six in 4 1/3 innings. Houston added two runs in the seventh on a wild pitch by Yankee relief pitcher Zack Britton that allowed Altuve to score, and a sacrifice fly by Yuli Gurriel that scored Michael Brantley. Cole pitched seven shutout innings for the Astros, allowing four hits with five walks and seven strikeouts. Gleyber Torres put the Yankees on the board in the eighth inning with a home run off Joe Smith. Houston closer Roberto Osuna pitched a perfect ninth inning for his first save of the postseason.

=== Game 4 ===
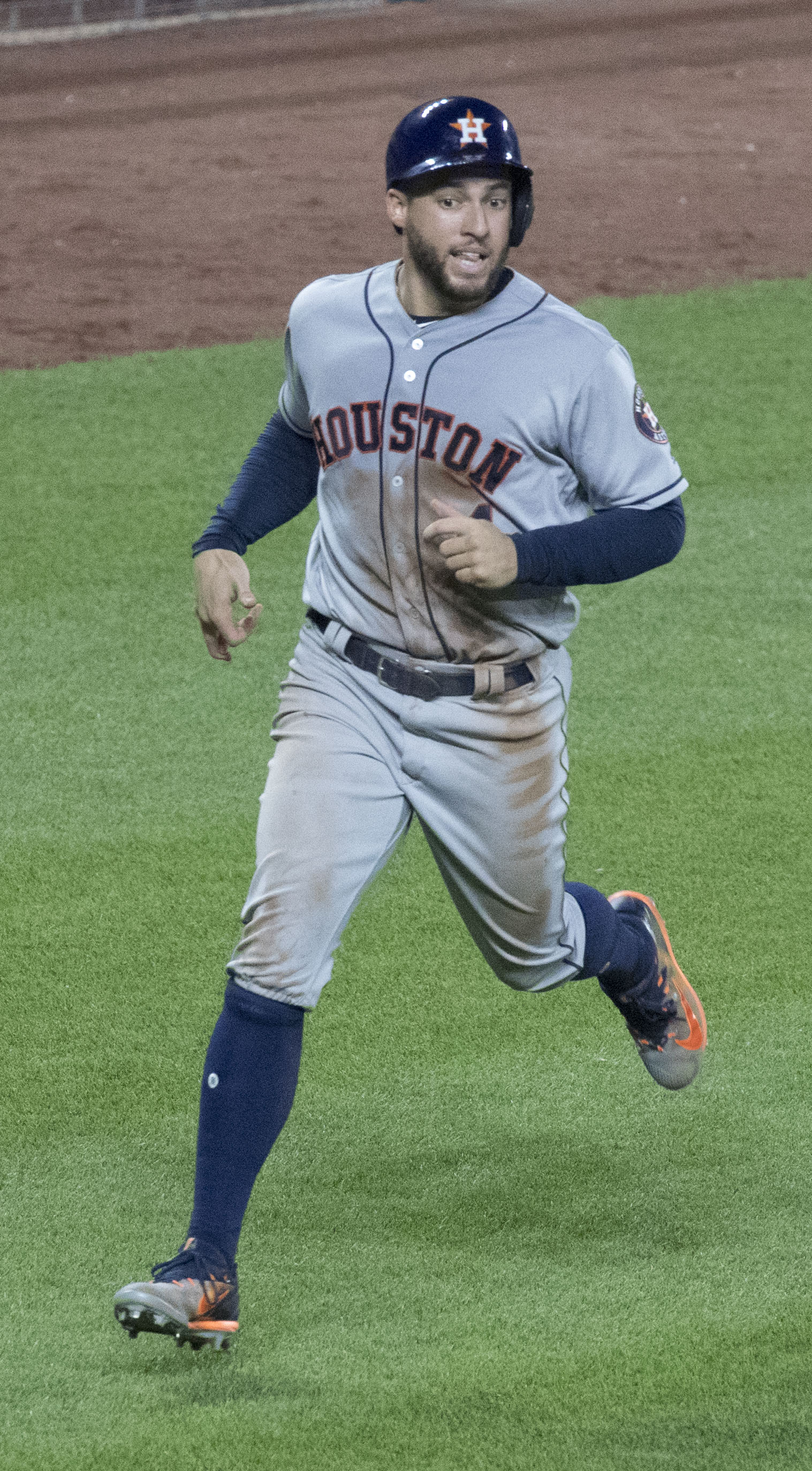
George Springer hit his second home run of the series in Game 4.

Thursday, October 17, 2019 8:08 pm (EDT) at Yankee Stadium in Bronx, New York, 56 °F (13 °C), cloudy, wind 16 mph out to RF
Team	1	2	3	4	5	6	7	8	9	R	H	E
Houston	0	0	3	0	0	3	0	1	1	8	8	1
New York	1	0	0	0	0	2	0	0	0	3	5	4
WP: Ryan Pressly (1–0) LP: Masahiro Tanaka (1–1); Home runs: HOU: George Springer (2), Carlos Correa (2); NYY: Gary Sanchez (1); Attendance: 49,067; Boxscore

Game 4 was originally scheduled for October 16, but was postponed and rescheduled to October 17 due to the "bomb cyclone" that hit the Northeast. Umpire Jeff Nelson was removed from the umpiring crew after tests indicated he suffered a concussion during Game 3; he was replaced by Mike Everitt.

The Yankees scored once in the first inning, forcing in a run with two walks after having runners on first and second with two out. The Astros took a 3–1 lead in the third inning, via a three-run home run by George Springer. Houston starting pitcher Zack Greinke exited after 4 1/3 innings, having allowing one run on three hits and striking out five. New York starter Masahiro Tanaka was removed one batter into the sixth inning; he was replaced by Chad Green, who gave up a three-run home run to Carlos Correa three batters later. Tanaka was charged with four runs on four hits, while striking out one. A two-run home run by Gary Sánchez in the bottom of the sixth cut the Astros' lead to 6–3. A double by Alex Bregman followed by two Yankee errors gave the Astros a run in the eighth. With runners on first and third and nobody out, Yankee left-hander CC Sabathia entered the game in relief of Adam Ottavino and threw 20 pitches to five batters, retiring two, before leaving with a shoulder injury to a standing ovation from fans and players on both teams. The Yankees removed Sabathia from their roster the next day, rendering him ineligible to pitch in the World Series and ending his storied 19-year career. Houston extended their lead to 8–3 in the ninth inning, on an error, wild pitch, and single. The Yankees were unable to score in the bottom of the ninth, as Roberto Osuna concluded matters by retiring Gleyber Torres on a flyout to Springer and the Astros were a victory away from playing Washington in the World Series.

=== Game 5 ===
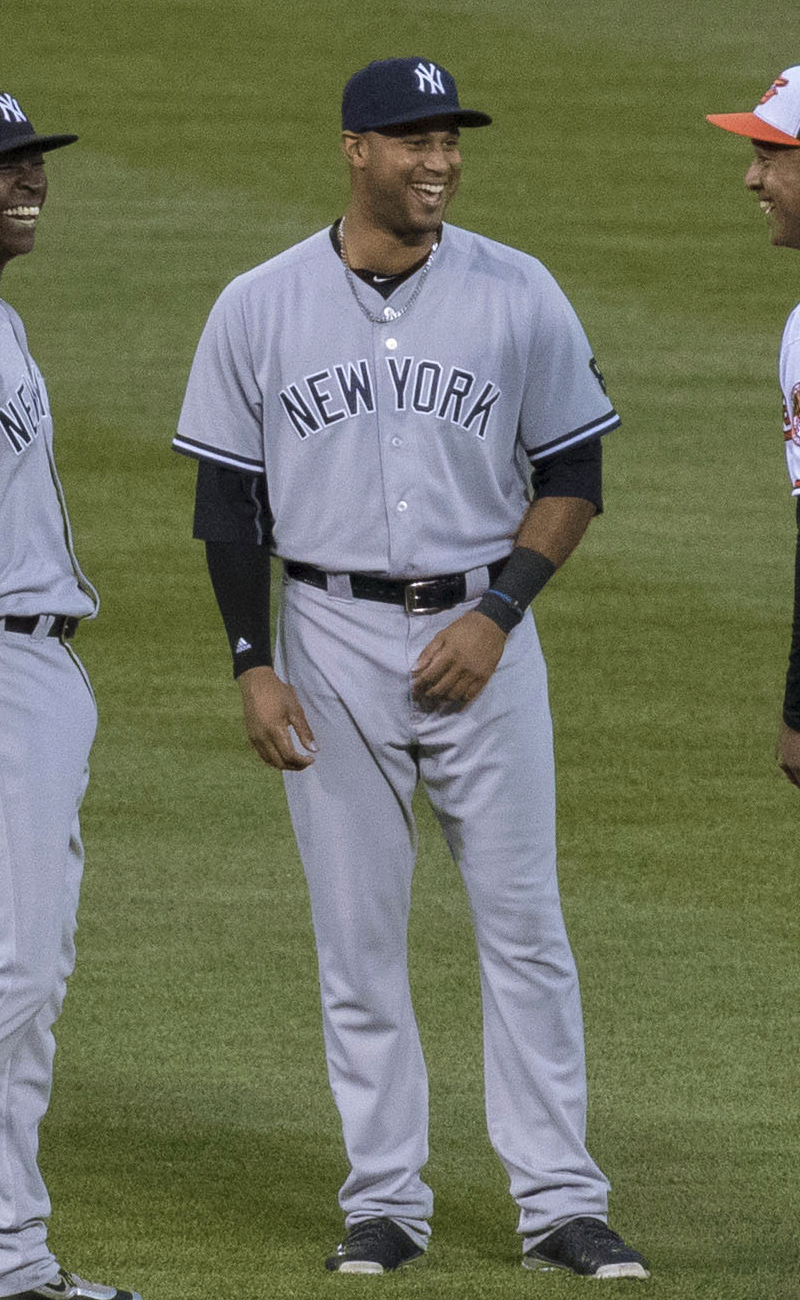
A three-run home run by Aaron Hicks provided the Yankees' winning margin in Game 5.

Friday, October 18, 2019 7:08 pm (EDT) at Yankee Stadium in Bronx, New York, 52 °F (11 °C), partly cloudy, wind 11 mph L to R
Team	1	2	3	4	5	6	7	8	9	R	H	E
Houston	1	0	0	0	0	0	0	0	0	1	5	0
New York	4	0	0	0	0	0	0	0	X	4	5	0
WP: James Paxton (1–0) LP: Justin Verlander (0–1) Sv: Aroldis Chapman (1); Home runs: HOU: None; NYY: DJ LeMahieu (1), Aaron Hicks (1); Attendance: 48,483; Boxscore

Game 5 was originally scheduled for October 17, but was rescheduled to October 18 when Game 4 was postponed. Pitcher CC Sabathia, who had left Game 4 with a shoulder injury, was removed from the Yankees' postseason roster and replaced by Ben Heller.

The Astros took an early 1–0 lead, as George Springer led off the game with an infield single, went to second on a passed ball, advanced to third on a ground out, and then scored on a wild pitch. But the Yankees would strike back immediately, as DJ LeMahieu tied the game with a home run to lead off the bottom of the first on Justin Verlander's second pitch. Aaron Judge followed with a single before Gleyber Torres advanced him to third on a double, setting up a crucial opportunity. Verlander appeared to have recovered, striking out Giancarlo Stanton on a full count before putting Aaron Hicks in an 0-2 hole. However, Hicks would lay off the next three pitches, all outside the zone, before crushing a fly ball down the right field line. With the entire stadium holding its breath, the ball hit the foul pole to immense celebration from the crowd, giving the Yankees a 4–1 lead. New York starting pitcher James Paxton left after six innings, having allowed one run on four hits while striking out nine. Verlander, despite the shaky start, would hold the fort for seven innings, striking out nine while allowing four runs on five hits, and suffered the loss. With no scoring other than in the first inning, Aroldis Chapman set down the side in order in the top of the ninth, earning his second save this postseason, as he retired Springer on a groundout to Gio Urshela to send the series back to Houston and extend the Yankees' season. This was the first game in MLB postseason history (1,609 games) that both teams scored in the first inning, then were held scoreless the rest of the game.

=== Game 6 ===
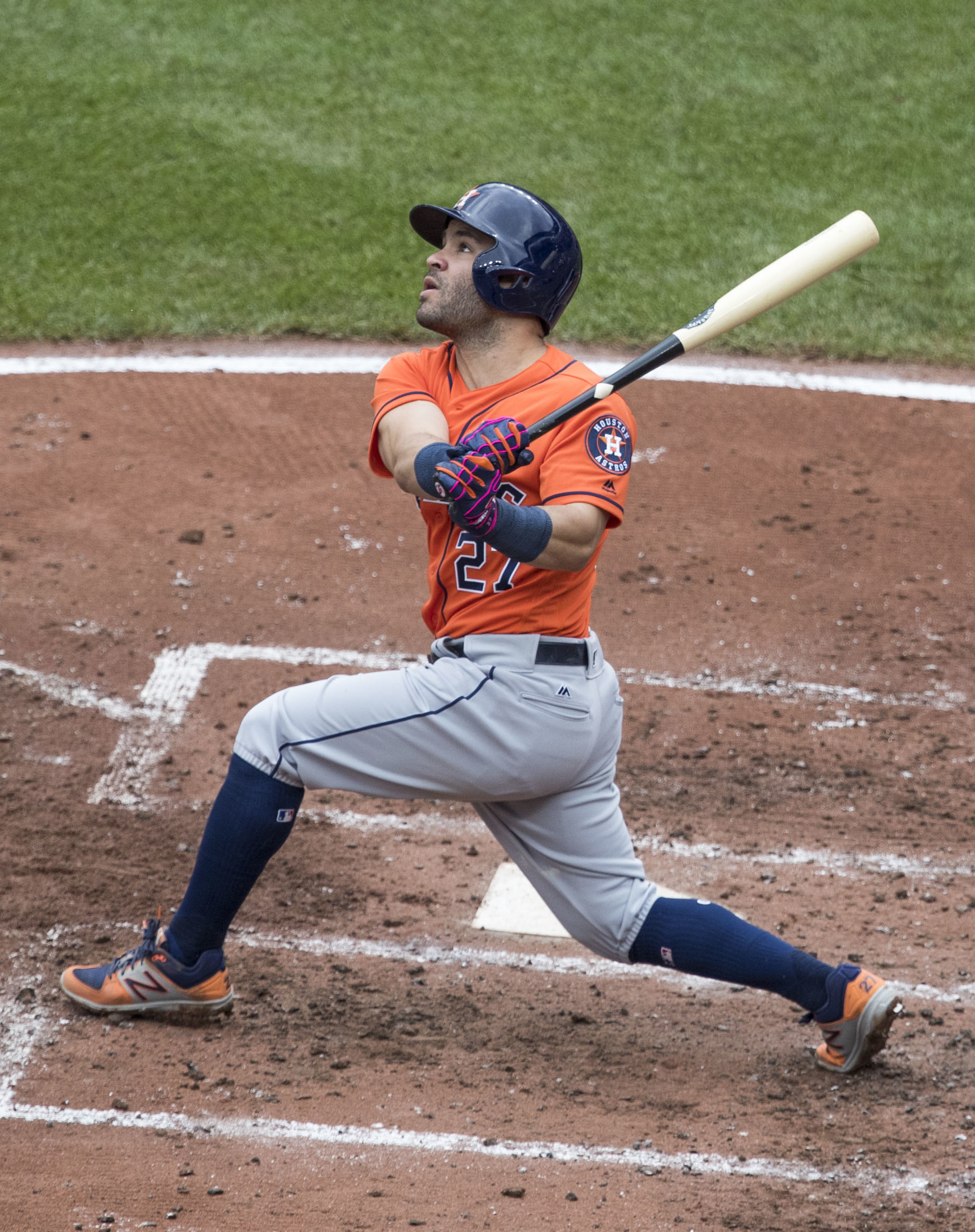
A walk-off home run by Jose Altuve in Game 6 sent the Astros to the World Series.

Saturday, October 19, 2019 7:08 pm (CDT) at Minute Maid Park in Houston, Texas, 73 °F (23 °C), roof closed
Team	1	2	3	4	5	6	7	8	9	R	H	E
New York	0	1	0	1	0	0	0	0	2	4	10	0
Houston	3	0	0	0	0	1	0	0	2	6	6	0
WP: Roberto Osuna (1–0) LP: Aroldis Chapman (0–1); Home runs: NYY: Gio Urshela (2), DJ LeMahieu (2); HOU: Yuli Gurriel (1), Jose Altuve (2); Attendance: 43,357; Boxscore

External videos
- Game 6 full replay on the MLB's official YouTube channel

In a "bullpen game", the starting pitchers were Brad Peacock, who had pitched a scoreless eighth inning in Game 5 for Houston, and Chad Green for New York. Yuli Gurriel gave Houston an early lead, with a three-run homer in the bottom of the first inning. Green left after the first inning, having allowed three runs on two hits, while recording one strikeout. The Yankees closed to 3–1 in the second inning, after Didi Gregorius doubled and Gary Sánchez hit an RBI single with two out. Peacock left after 1 2/3 innings, having allowed a run on two hits while striking out two batters. A Gio Urshela home run in the top of the fourth inning trimmed Houston's lead to 3–2. In the bottom of the sixth, Alex Bregman hit into a fielder's choice, scoring the fourth run for the Astros. In the top of the ninth inning, an Urshela single was followed two batters later by a DJ LeMahieu home run that tied the game at four. After George Springer extended the bottom of the ninth with a two-out walk, Jose Altuve hit a walk-off two-run home run off Aroldis Chapman to win the game and send the Astros to their second World Series in three years; it was also the second time in three years that Chapman gave up the winning hit in a tied ALCS game in the ninth inning. Altuve's pennant-winning homer was the fifth to end any LCS, after Chris Chambliss (1976 ALCS), Aaron Boone (2003 ALCS), Magglio Ordonez (2006 ALCS), and Travis Ishikawa (2014 NLCS).

During the trophy ceremony to present the league trophy, Jose Altuvé was named series MVP for Houston, becoming the first Astros position player to win the LCS MVP Award (all previous Astros to win the award were pitchers).

With this loss, the 2010s became the first decade since the 1910s not to have the Yankees play in a World Series, as their last appearance (and title) was in 2009, and the second decade that the Yankees did not win at least one World Series (lost to the Dodgers in 1981 in their only appearance in the World Series in the 1980s). It was also the first decade since the 1910s that a New York City team did not win a World Series, as the Mets lost in 2015.

==== The Jose Altuve home run call ====
- FS1, with Joe Buck:

ALTUVE! HAS JUST SENT THE ASTROS TO THE WORLD SERIES!

=== Composite line score ===
2019 ALCS (4–2): Houston Astros beat New York Yankees

Team	1	2	3	4	5	6	7	8	9	10	11	R	H	E
New York Yankees	5	1	0	4	0	4	2	1	4	0	0	21	44	5
Houston Astros	5	2	3	0	1	4	2	1	3	0	1	22	36	2
Total attendance: 276,575 Average attendance: 46,096

== Aftermath ==
During clubhouse celebrations after the Astros won Game 6 of the 2019 ALCS, Astros assistant general manager Brandon Taubman taunted a group of nearby female reporters by aggressively praising Astros relief pitcher Roberto Osuna, an alleged domestic abuser. The Astros had received backlash after trading for Osuna near the 2018 trade deadline as he was serving a 75-game suspension after serious domestic violence accusations. Taubman, who was involved in the acquisition of Osuna, was defensive of Osuna's performance as a reliever and overall presence on the team. Taubman had previously complained about the fact that one of the reporters in the group had a practice of tweeting out a domestic violence hotline number whenever Osuna took the mound for the Astros. After the season, Taubman was placed on MLB's ineligible list through at least the end of the 2020 season as a result of his behavior.

The Astros would go on to lose the 2019 World Series to the National League Champion Washington Nationals in seven games with the road team winning all seven games. Washington won 1, 2, 6, and the deciding Game 7 at Minute Maid Park in Houston and Houston won all three games at Nationals Park in Washington, D.C.

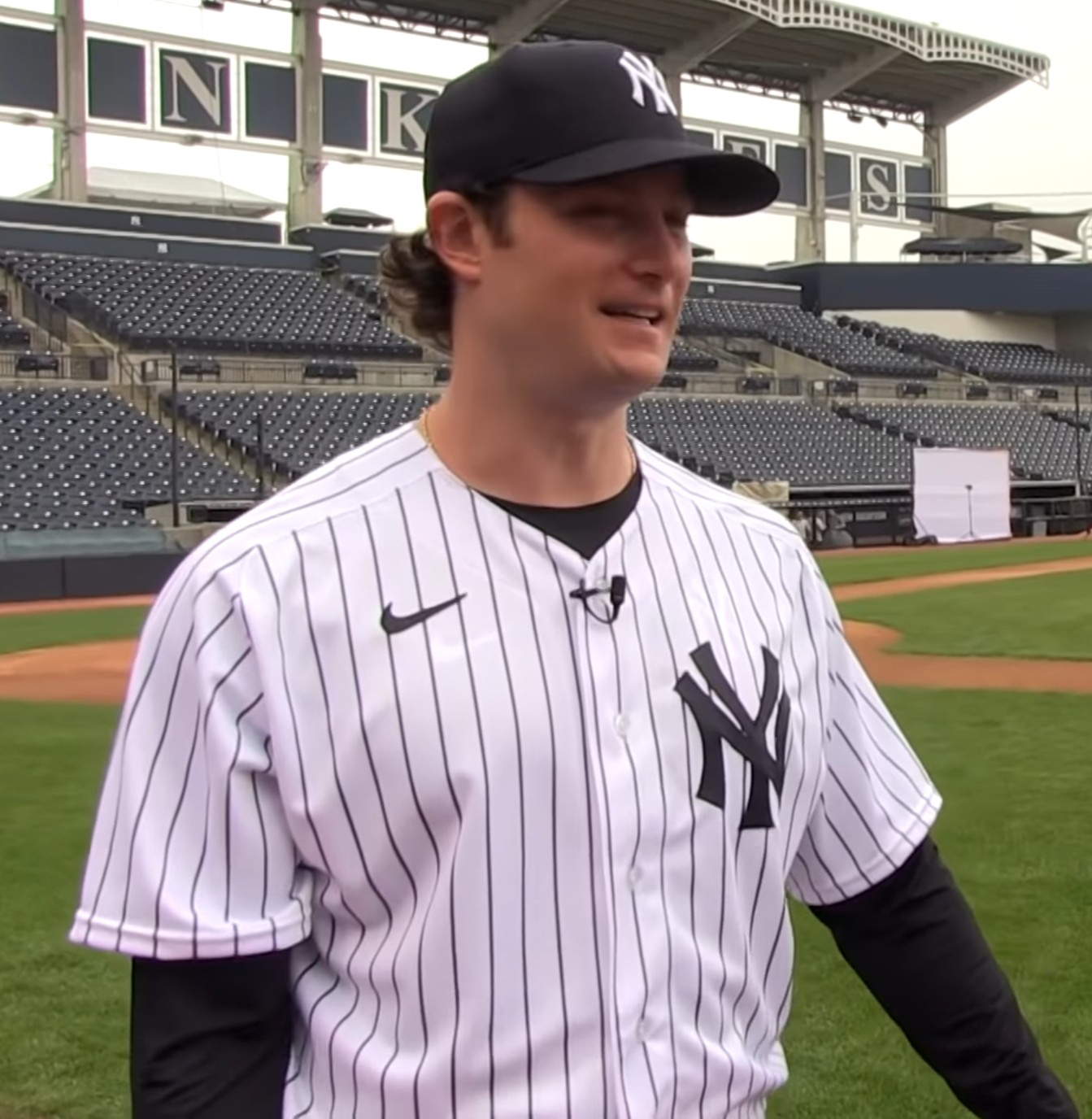
Gerrit Cole, a New York Yankees fan growing up, signed with them as a free agent after the 2019 season.

On December 18, 2019, the Yankees signed free agent pitcher Gerrit Cole away from the Astros, only sparking the recent rivalry between the two clubs which started during the 2017 American League Championship Series. While the Yankees signed a current ace in Gerrit Cole during the off-season, their former ace C.C. Sabathia retired at the season's end. His Game 4 relief appearance was the last of his career.

The animosity between the two teams only grew stronger in January of the next year, due to the revelations of the Houston Astros sign stealing scandal during the 2017 season. Hours after MLB announced its findings, Astros owner Jim Crane fired Luhnow and Hinch, while a day later the Red Sox fired Alex Cora, who had been the bench coach for the 2017 Astros. A week later, the New York Mets and Carlos Beltrán, who was hired as their manager in the 2019–2020 offseason, mutually agreed to part ways, as he was the only then-Astros player called out by name for his involvement in the scheme. While conspiracy theories had been floated about the 2019 ALCS by various members of media and players, there was found to be no proof of any wrongdoing in said series.

Houston replaced Luhnow with Tampa Bay Rays vice president of baseball operations James Click, while veteran manager Dusty Baker took over for Hinch. Hinch and Cora would find work shortly after their season long suspensions ended; Hinch became the manager of the Detroit Tigers and Cora was re-hired by the Red Sox. While Beltran has not found a major league manager job since, he was hired in 2022 to broadcast games for the Yankees. In 2023, Beltran found his way back to the Mets, joining their front office as a special assistant.

The Astros and Yankees nearly met again for a chance at the American League pennant for the third time in four years, but the Yankees lost to the Rays in a winner-take-all elimination game in the 2020 American League Division Series. In that series, Aroldis Chapman gave up another game and series clinching home run to Rays outfielder Mike Brosseau in the 8th inning. The Rays beat the Astros in the ALCS that year, but Houston rebounded in 2021 with a victory over the Boston Red Sox (who had beaten the Yankees in the Wild Card Game) in six games in the ALCS to become the first AL team to make three World Series appearances in a five-year span since the Yankees in the early 21st century. The Astros, however, were defeated in the 2021 World Series by the Braves.

In the 2022 American League Championship Series, the Astros and Yankees faced off for the American League pennant for the third time in the last six years. The Astros won in four games in dominant fashion, marking the first time in ten years that the Yankees had been swept in four games. From 2015-2022, the Astros had won thirteen of eighteen postseason games against New York. In the 2022 World Series, the Astros defeated the Philadelphia Phillies, giving them their second championship in franchise history.

== See also ==
- 2019 National League Championship Series
- Astros–Yankees rivalry
