= List of American League Division Series broadcasters =

The following is a list of the national television and radio networks and announcers that have covered the American League Division Series throughout the years. It does include any announcers who may have appeared on local radio broadcasts produced by the participating teams.

== Television ==
=== 2020s ===
Year	Series	Network	Play-by-play	Color commentator(s)	Field reporter(s)
2026	Tampa Bay Rays/New York Yankees	TBS/TruTV/HBO Max	Brian Anderson	Jeff Francoeur	Lauren Shehadi
2026	Cleveland Guardians/Chicago White Sox	TBS/TruTV/HBO Max	Alex Faust	Ron Darling	Lauren Jbara
2025	Toronto Blue Jays/New York Yankees	Fox/Fox One (Game 1) (U.S.)	Joe Davis	John Smoltz	Ken Rosenthal
2025	Toronto Blue Jays/New York Yankees	FS1/Fox One (Games 2–4) (U.S.)	Joe Davis	John Smoltz	Ken Rosenthal
2025	Toronto Blue Jays/New York Yankees	Sportsnet (Canada)	Dan Shulman	Buck Martinez	Hazel Mae, Caleb Joseph, and Kevin Pillar
2025	Seattle Mariners/Detroit Tigers	FS1 (Games 1–2, 4)	Adam Amin	A. J. Pierzynski and Adam Wainwright	Tom Verducci
2025	Seattle Mariners/Detroit Tigers	FS2/MLB Network (Game 3)	Adam Amin	A. J. Pierzynski and Adam Wainwright	Tom Verducci
2025	Seattle Mariners/Detroit Tigers	Fox (Game 5)	Adam Amin	A. J. Pierzynski and Adam Wainwright	Tom Verducci
2024	New York Yankees/Kansas City Royals	TBS/TruTV/Max	Bob Costas	Ron Darling	Jon Morosi
2024	Cleveland Guardians/Detroit Tigers	TBS/TruTV/Max (Games 1–3, 5)	Brian Anderson	Jeff Francoeur	Lauren Jbara
2024	Cleveland Guardians/Detroit Tigers	TNT/Max (Game 4)	Brian Anderson	Jeff Francoeur	Lauren Jbara
2023	Baltimore Orioles/Texas Rangers	FS1 (Games 1–2)	Joe Davis	John Smoltz	Ken Rosenthal
2023	Baltimore Orioles/Texas Rangers	Fox (Game 3)	Joe Davis	John Smoltz	Ken Rosenthal
2023	Houston Astros/Minnesota Twins	FS1 (Games 1–2, 4)	Adam Amin	A. J. Pierzynski and Adam Wainwright	Tom Verducci
2023	Houston Astros/Minnesota Twins	Fox (Game 3)	Adam Amin	A. J. Pierzynski and Adam Wainwright	Tom Verducci
2022	Houston Astros/Seattle Mariners	TBS	Brian Anderson	Jeff Francoeur	Matt Winer
2022	New York Yankees/Cleveland Guardians	TBS	Bob Costas	Ron Darling	Lauren Shehadi (Games 1–4); Matt Winer (Game 5)
2021	Tampa Bay Rays/Boston Red Sox	FS1 (Games 1–2, 4)	Joe Davis	John Smoltz	Ken Rosenthal
2021	Tampa Bay Rays/Boston Red Sox	MLB Network (Game 3)	Matt Vasgersian	John Smoltz	Ken Rosenthal
2021	Houston Astros/Chicago White Sox	FS1 (Games 1, 3–4)	Adam Amin	A. J. Pierzynski and Adam Wainwright (in Chicago)	Tom Verducci
2021	Houston Astros/Chicago White Sox	MLB Network (Game 2)	Bob Costas	Jim Kaat and Buck Showalter	Tom Verducci
2020	Tampa Bay Rays/New York Yankees	TBS	Brian Anderson	Ron Darling	Lauren Shehadi
2020	Oakland Athletics/Houston Astros	TBS	Don Orsillo	Jeff Francoeur	Matt Winer

==== Notes ====
- In 2022, due to the length of Game 3 between the Houston Astros and Seattle Mariners, TNT, TBS' designated overflow network, aired the entirety of Game 3 between the New York Yankees and Cleveland Guardians, with TBS joining in progress during the eighth inning.
  - Beginning with the 2022 postseason, MLB allowed Sportsnet, the home network of the Toronto Blue Jays, to produce their own broadcasts of the team's games in Canada rather than a mere simulcast of the American network feed or an MLB International-produced broadcast.
- Due to a rain delay, Game 3 of the 2025 American League Division Series between the Seattle Mariners and Detroit Tigers was rescheduled to 7PM E.T./4PM P.T. and moved to FS2 and MLB Network.

=== 2010s ===
Year	Series	Network	Play-by-play	Color commentator(s)	Field reporter(s)
2019	Houston Astros/Tampa Bay Rays	FS1 (Games 1–2, 4–5)	Kenny Albert	Joe Girardi and A. J. Pierzynski	Jon Paul Morosi
2019	Houston Astros/Tampa Bay Rays	MLB Network (Game 3)	Bob Costas	Joe Girardi and Jim Kaat	Jon Paul Morosi
2019	New York Yankees/Minnesota Twins	MLB Network (Game 1)	Bob Costas	John Smoltz	Tom Verducci
2019	New York Yankees/Minnesota Twins	FS1 (Games 2–3)	Joe Davis	John Smoltz	Ken Rosenthal and Tom Verducci
2018	Boston Red Sox/New York Yankees	TBS	Brian Anderson	Ron Darling	Lauren Shehadi
2018	Houston Astros/Cleveland Indians	TBS	Don Orsillo	Dennis Eckersley	Hazel Mae
2017	Cleveland Indians/New York Yankees	FS1 (Games 1, 3–5)	Matt Vasgersian	John Smoltz	Ken Rosenthal and Tom Verducci
2017	Cleveland Indians/New York Yankees	MLB Network (Game 2)	Matt Vasgersian	John Smoltz	Ken Rosenthal and Tom Verducci
2017	Houston Astros/Boston Red Sox	MLB Network (Game 1)	Bob Costas	Jim Kaat	Jon Paul Morosi
2017	Houston Astros/Boston Red Sox	FS1 (Games 2–4)	Joe Davis	David Cone and A. J. Pierzynski	Jon Paul Morosi
2016	Texas Rangers/Toronto Blue Jays	TBS (U.S.)	Brian Anderson	Dennis Eckersley and Joe Simpson	Matt Winer
2016	Texas Rangers/Toronto Blue Jays	Sportsnet (Canada)	Brian Anderson	Dennis Eckersley and Joe Simpson	Matt Winer
2016	Cleveland Indians/Boston Red Sox	TBS	Ernie Johnson	Ron Darling and Cal Ripken	Sam Ryan
2015	Kansas City Royals/Houston Astros	FS1 (Games 1–2, 4–5)	Matt Vasgersian	John Smoltz and A. J. Pierzynski	Jon Paul Morosi
2015	Kansas City Royals/Houston Astros	MLB Network (Game 3)	Matt Vasgersian	John Smoltz	Jon Paul Morosi
2015	Toronto Blue Jays/Texas Rangers	FS1 (Games 1–3; U.S.)	Kenny Albert	Harold Reynolds and Tom Verducci	Ken Rosenthal
2015	Toronto Blue Jays/Texas Rangers	MLB Network (Game 2; U.S.)	Bob Costas	Jim Kaat	Ken Rosenthal
2015	Toronto Blue Jays/Texas Rangers	Sportsnet (Canada)	Simulcast of U.S. feed		
2014	Los Angeles Angels of Anaheim/Kansas City Royals	TBS	Ernie Johnson	Ron Darling and Cal Ripken	Matt Winer
2014	Baltimore Orioles/Detroit Tigers	TBS	Brian Anderson	Dennis Eckersley and Joe Simpson	Jaime Maggio
2013	Detroit Tigers/Oakland Athletics	TBS (Games 1–2, 4–5)	Don Orsillo	Dennis Eckersley and Buck Martinez	David Aldridge
2013	Detroit Tigers/Oakland Athletics	MLB Network (Game 3)	Matt Vasgersian	Jim Kaat	Sam Ryan
2013	Boston Red Sox/Tampa Bay Rays	TBS	Brian Anderson	John Smoltz and Joe Simpson	Rachel Nichols
2012	Baltimore Orioles/New York Yankees	TBS	Ernie Johnson	John Smoltz and Cal Ripken	Craig Sager
2012	Detroit Tigers/Oakland Athletics	TBS (Games 1, 3)	Don Orsillo	Buck Martinez	Jaime Maggio
2012	Detroit Tigers/Oakland Athletics	TNT (Games 4–5)	Don Orsillo	Buck Martinez	Jaime Maggio
2012	Detroit Tigers/Oakland Athletics	MLB Network (Game 2)	Matt Vasgersian	Jim Kaat	Sam Ryan
2011	New York Yankees/Detroit Tigers	TNT (Games 1–2)	Brian Anderson	Ron Darling and John Smoltz	Tom Verducci
2011	New York Yankees/Detroit Tigers	TBS (Games 3–5)	Brian Anderson	Ron Darling and John Smoltz	Tom Verducci
2011	Texas Rangers/Tampa Bay Rays	TBS (Game 1, 3–4)	Don Orsillo	Buck Martinez	Jaime Maggio
2011	Texas Rangers/Tampa Bay Rays	TNT (Game 2)	Don Orsillo	Buck Martinez	Jaime Maggio
2010	Tampa Bay Rays/Texas Rangers	TBS	Don Orsillo	Buck Martinez; Ron Darling (Game 5)	Marc Fein
2010	Minnesota Twins/New York Yankees	TBS	Ernie Johnson	Ron Darling and John Smoltz	Craig Sager

==== Notes ====
- TNT was scheduled to air three entire Division Series games in 2011 due to conflicts with TBS. On October 1, it aired Game 2 of the Tampa Bay Rays vs. the Texas Rangers at 7 p.m. ET, which overlapped with the end of Game 1 of the St. Louis Cardinals vs. the Philadelphia Phillies and the continuation of Game 1 of the Detroit Tigers vs. the New York Yankees on TBS. (The latter was also to have been Game 2, but Game 1 was suspended after 1 1/2 innings due to rain.) On October 2, it aired the rescheduled Game 2 between the Tigers and the Yankees at 3 p.m. ET, two hours before Game 2 of the Arizona Diamondbacks vs. the Milwaukee Brewers on TBS. On October 4, it aired Game 3 of the Diamondbacks vs. the Brewers at 9:30 p.m. ET, one hour after Game 3 of the Tigers vs. the Yankees started on TBS.
- For the 2012 and 2013 seasons, TBS has been awarded the rights to televise both Wild Card Playoff games that occur on the day before the Division Series games. In exchange, MLB Network has been awarded the rights to televise two of the Division Series games that previously belonged to TBS.
- Beginning in 2014, when Fox Sports began a new television contract with Major League Baseball, FS1 airs 40 regular season MLB games (mostly on Saturdays), along with up to 15 post-season games (eight Divisional Series games and one best-of-7 League Championship Series). The deal resulted in a reduction of MLB coverage on the Fox network, which will air 12 regular season games, the All-Star Game, and the World Series.
- Don Orsillo replaced Ernie Johnson on TBS' 2018 ALDS coverage after Johnson announced that he would not cover the Major League Baseball playoffs as a result of his treatment for the blood clots in both of his legs.

=== 2000s ===
Year	Series	Network	Play-by-play	Color commentator(s)	Field reporter(s)
2009	New York Yankees/Minnesota Twins	TBS	Chip Caray	Ron Darling	Craig Sager
2009	Los Angeles Angels of Anaheim/Boston Red Sox	TBS	Don Orsillo	Buck Martinez	Marc Fein
2008	Los Angeles Angels of Anaheim/Boston Red Sox	TBS	Chip Caray	Buck Martinez and Ron Darling (Game 4)	Craig Sager
2008	Chicago White Sox/Tampa Bay Rays	TBS	Don Orsillo	Harold Reynolds	Marc Fein
2007	Cleveland Indians/New York Yankees	TBS	Chip Caray	Tony Gwynn and Bob Brenly	Craig Sager
2007	Boston Red Sox/Los Angeles Angels of Anaheim	TBS	Ted Robinson	Steve Stone	José Mota
2006	New York Yankees/Detroit Tigers	Fox (Games 1, 4)	Joe Buck (Game 1); Josh Lewin (Game 4)	Tim McCarver (Game 1); Steve Lyons (Game 4)	
2006	New York Yankees/Detroit Tigers	ESPN (Games 2–3)	Jon Miller	Joe Morgan; Ernie Harwell (Game 3)	
2006	Minnesota Twins/Oakland Athletics	ESPN	Jon Miller (Game 1); Dave O'Brien (Games 2–3)	Joe Morgan (Game 1); Rick Sutcliffe and Eric Karros (Games 2–3)	
2005	Chicago White Sox/Boston Red Sox	ESPN (in Southern Chicago); ESPN2 (in Boston)	Chris Berman	Rick Sutcliffe and Mike Piazza	
2005	Los Angeles Angels of Anaheim/New York Yankees	Fox (Games 1, 4–5)	Joe Buck (Games 1, 5); Thom Brennaman (Game 4)	Tim McCarver	
2005	Los Angeles Angels of Anaheim/New York Yankees	ESPN (Games 2–3)	Jon Miller	Joe Morgan	
2004	Anaheim Angels/Boston Red Sox	ESPN	Chris Berman	Rick Sutcliffe and Tony Gwynn	
2004	New York Yankees/Minnesota Twins	Fox (Games 1, 4)	Joe Buck (Game 1); Josh Lewin (Game 4)	Tim McCarver (Game 1); Steve Lyons (Game 4)	
2004	New York Yankees/Minnesota Twins	ESPN (Games 2–3)	Jon Miller	Joe Morgan	
2003	New York Yankees/Minnesota Twins	ESPN (Games 1, 3–4)	Jon Miller (Game 1); Gary Thorne (in Minnesota)	Joe Morgan (Game 1); Jeff Brantley and David Justice (in Minnesota)	
2003	New York Yankees/Minnesota Twins	Fox (Game 2)	Joe Buck	Tim McCarver	
2003	Oakland Athletics/Boston Red Sox	ESPN (Games 1, 4); ESPN2 (Games 2–3)	Dave O'Brien (Game 1); Jon Miller (Games 2–4)	Jeff Brantley and David Justice (Game 1); Joe Morgan (Games 2–4)	
2003	Oakland Athletics/Boston Red Sox	Fox (Game 5)	Thom Brennaman	Steve Lyons	
2002	New York Yankees/Anaheim Angels	Fox (Games 1–2, 4)	Joe Buck (Games 1–2); Thom Brennaman (Game 4)	Tim McCarver	
2002	New York Yankees/Anaheim Angels	ABC Family (Game 3)	Jon Miller	Joe Morgan	
2002	Oakland Athletics/Minnesota Twins	ABC Family; ESPN2 (Game 2)	Jon Miller (in Oakland); Dave O'Brien (in Minnesota)	Joe Morgan (in Oakland); Tony Gwynn and Rick Sutcliffe (in Minnesota)	
2001	New York Yankees/Oakland Athletics	Fox	Joe Buck (Games 1–2); Thom Brennaman (Games 3–5)	Tim McCarver (Games 1–2); Steve Lyons (Games 3–5)	
2001	Seattle Mariners/Cleveland Indians	Fox (Games 1, 3, 5)	Josh Lewin	Rex Hudler	
2001	Seattle Mariners/Cleveland Indians	Fox Family (Games 2, 4)	Josh Lewin	Rex Hudler	
2000	Oakland Athletics/New York Yankees	NBC (Games 1, 3–4)/Pax (Game 1)	Skip Caray	Joe Morgan	Bob Wischusen (Game 1); Jim Gray (in New York City)
2000	Oakland Athletics/New York Yankees	Fox (Games 2, 5)	Joe Buck (Game 2); Thom Brennaman (Game 5)	Tim McCarver (Game 2); Bob Brenly (Game 5)	
2000	Chicago White Sox/Seattle Mariners	ESPN	Chris Berman	Rick Sutcliffe	

==== Notes ====
- In 2000, NBC was caught in the dilemma of having to televise a first round playoff game between the New York Yankees and Oakland Athletics over the first presidential debate between George W. Bush and Al Gore. NBC decided to give its local stations the option of carrying the debate or the baseball game. If the NBC affiliate decided to carry the debate, then local Pax affiliate could carry the game. However, if there was no Pax availability and the local NBC affiliate aired the debate (which actually occurred in most NBC affiliates), then that market was shut out of the baseball telecast.
  - Skip Caray filled-in for Bob Costas on NBC's coverage of the 2000 New York-Oakland Division Series because Costas had just finished anchoring NBC's prime time coverage of the Summer Olympic Games from Sydney, Australia. Meanwhile, NBC used Bob Wischusen as a field reporter (filling-in for Jim Gray, who like Bob Costas, was covering the Sydney Olympics) for Game 1 of the ALDS.
- ABC Family's coverage of the Division Series was produced by ESPN. The reason that games were on ABC Family instead of ESPN was because The Walt Disney Company (ESPN's parent company) bought Fox Family from News Corporation. The ABC Family/ESPN inherited Division Series package was included in Fox's then exclusive television contract with Major League Baseball (initiated in 2001). ABC Family had no other choice but to fulfill the contract handed to them. The only usage of the ABC Family "bug" was for a ten-second period when returning from a commercial break (in the lower right corner of the screen).
  - Game 2 (played on October 2) of the Minnesota/Oakland series in 2002 started on ESPN2 because the San Francisco-Atlanta game (which started at 1 p.m. Eastern Time) ran over the three-hour time window. The game was eventually switched back to ABC Family once the early game ended.
- Former longtime Tigers announcer Ernie Harwell served as a special guest commentator for two innings in Game 3 of the 2006 Tigers-Yankees series.
- Turner Sports provided a provisional plan in which if a League Division Series game televised on TBS ran into the start of the next LDS game scheduled to air on TBS, then TNT would provide supplementary coverage of the latter games' early moments. To be more specific, all games in the Division Series round were presented back-to-back, with each game scheduled for a 3 1/2-hour window. If a game exceeded this window, the first pitch of the next game would be switched to TNT. If a game ended within 3 1/2 hours, the studio team would return for interstitial programming.
  - In 2007, TBS switched the starts of four games to TNT in the Division Series round because the previous games exceeded the time limit. TNT was also scheduled to air Game 4 of the Diamondbacks-Cubs series, which overlapped with Game 3 of the Red Sox-Angels series, but the former game was not played; the night before, the D-Backs completed a three-game sweep of the Cubs.

=== 1990s ===
Year	Series	Network	Play-by-play	Color commentator(s)	Field reporter(s)
1999	New York Yankees/Texas Rangers	NBC (Games 1, 3)	Bob Costas	Joe Morgan	
1999	New York Yankees/Texas Rangers	Fox (Game 2)	Thom Brennaman	Bob Brenly	
1999	Cleveland Indians/Boston Red Sox	Fox (Games 1, 3–5)	Joe Buck (Games 1, 5); Thom Brennaman (in Boston)	Tim McCarver (Games 1, 5); Bob Brenly (Games 3–5)	
1999	Cleveland Indians/Boston Red Sox	ESPN (Game 2)	Jon Miller	Joe Morgan	
1998	New York Yankees/Texas Rangers	Fox (Game 1)	Joe Buck	Tim McCarver	
1998	New York Yankees/Texas Rangers	NBC (Games 2–3)	Bob Costas	Joe Morgan	
1998	Cleveland Indians/Boston Red Sox	ESPN (Games 1–3)	Chris Berman	Ray Knight	
1998	Cleveland Indians/Boston Red Sox	Fox (Game 4)	Joe Buck	Tim McCarver	
1997	Cleveland Indians/New York Yankees	Fox (Games 1–2, 4–5)	Joe Buck	Tim McCarver and Bob Brenly	
1997	Cleveland Indians/New York Yankees	NBC (Game 3)	Bob Costas	Joe Morgan and Bob Uecker	
1997	Baltimore Orioles/Seattle Mariners	NBC (Game 1)	Bob Costas	Joe Morgan and Bob Uecker	
1997	Baltimore Orioles/Seattle Mariners	ESPN (Games 2, 4)	Jon Miller	Joe Morgan	
1997	Baltimore Orioles/Seattle Mariners	Fox (Game 3)	Thom Brennaman	Bob Brenly	
1996	Texas Rangers/New York Yankees	NBC (Games 1, 3)	Bob Costas	Joe Morgan and Bob Uecker	Jim Gray (Game 1)
1996	Texas Rangers/New York Yankees	Fox (Game 2)	Thom Brennaman	Bob Brenly	
1996	Texas Rangers/New York Yankees	ESPN (Game 4)	Chris Berman	Dave Campbell	
1996	Cleveland Indians/Baltimore Orioles	ESPN (Games 1–3); ESPN2 (Game 4)	Jon Miller	Dave Campbell and Kirby Puckett (Games 1, 3–4); Joe Morgan (Game 2)	
1995	Seattle Mariners/New York Yankees	NBC (in New York)	Gary Thorne	Tommy Hutton	
1995	Seattle Mariners/New York Yankees	ABC (in Seattle)	Brent Musburger	Jim Kaat	Jack Arute (Game 5)
1995	Cleveland Indians/Boston Red Sox	NBC (in Cleveland)	Bob Costas	Bob Uecker	
1995	Cleveland Indians/Boston Red Sox	ABC (in Boston)	Steve Zabriskie	Tommy Hutton	Bob Stevens (Game 3)

==== Notes ====
- 1995 marked the only year of postseason coverage provided by "The Baseball Network", which was a revenue sharing joint venture between Major League Baseball, ABC and NBC. "The Baseball Network" was also scheduled to cover the Division Series in 1994, but plans were scrapped when a strike caused the postseason to be canceled. All games in the first two rounds (including the League Championship Series) were scheduled in the same time slot for regional telecasts. Initially, under the alternating six-year plan, ABC would've covered the Division Series in even numbered years (as well as the World Series in even numbered years) while NBC would've covered the Division Series in odd numbered years (in even numbered years, they would've gotten the rights to the All-Star Game and League Championship Series).
- From 1996–2000, NBC aired LDS games on Tuesday/Friday/Saturday nights. Fox aired LDS games on Wednesday/Thursday nights, Saturdays in the late afternoon, plus Sunday/Monday nights (if necessary). Meanwhile, ESPN carried many afternoon LDS contests. At this point, all playoff games were nationally televised (mostly in unopposed timeslots).

=== 1981 ===
Year	Series	Network	Play-by-play	Color commentator
1981	Oakland Athletics/Kansas City Royals	ABC	Al Michaels	Jim Palmer
1981	New York Yankees/Milwaukee Brewers	ABC	Keith Jackson (Games 1–3, 5); Don Drysdale (Game 4)	Don Drysdale and Howard Cosell

==== Notes ====
- In 1981, as means to recoup revenue lost during a players strike, Major League Baseball set up a special additional playoff round (as a prelude to the League Championship Series). ABC televised the American League Division Series while NBC televised the National League Division Series. The Division Series round was not officially instituted until 14 years later. Games 3 of the Brewers/Yankees series and Royals/Athletics series were aired regionally. On October 10, Keith Jackson missed Game 4 of Milwaukee-New York series due to his commitment in calling an called an Oklahoma vs. Texas college football game for ABC. Consequently, Don Drysdale filled-in for him on play-by-play alongside Howard Cosell. Bob Uecker was originally named to join Al Michaels and Jim Palmer on ABC's secondary crew, but the network excused him due to the involvement of the Brewers (for whom Uecker was a local radio announcer) in the ALDS.

== Radio ==
=== National ===
==== 2020s ====
Year	Series	Network	Play-by-play	Color commentator(s)
2026	Tampa Bay Rays/New York Yankees	ESPN	Mike Couzens	Eduardo Pérez and Tim Kurkjian
2026	Cleveland Guardians/Chicago White Sox	ESPN	Roxy Bernstein	Gregg Olson
2025	Toronto Blue Jays/New York Yankees	ESPN	Karl Ravech	Eduardo Pérez and Tim Kurkjian
2025	Seattle Mariners/Detroit Tigers	ESPN	Roxy Bernstein	Gregg Olson
2024	New York Yankees/Kansas City Royals	ESPN	Karl Ravech	Eduardo Pérez and Tim Kurkjian
2024	Cleveland Guardians/Detroit Tigers	ESPN	Dave O'Brien	Gregg Olson
2023	Baltimore Orioles/Texas Rangers	ESPN	Karl Ravech	Tim Kurkjian
2023	Houston Astros/Minnesota Twins	ESPN	Dave O'Brien (Games 1–3); Mike Couzens (Game 4)	Eduardo Pérez
2022	Seattle Mariners/Houston Astros	ESPN	Dave O'Brien	Marly Rivera
2022	Cleveland Guardians/New York Yankees	ESPN	Dan Shulman	Eduardo Pérez
2021	Tampa Bay Rays/Boston Red Sox	ESPN	Dan Shulman	Xavier Scruggs
2021	Houston Astros/Chicago White Sox	ESPN	Kevin Brown	Chris Burke
2020	Tampa Bay Rays/New York Yankees	ESPN	Dan Shulman	Chris Singleton
2020	Oakland Athletics/Houston Astros	ESPN	Dave O’Brien	Jim Bowden (Games 1, 3–4); Kyle Peterson (Game 2)

===== Notes =====
- Due to health and safety concerns related to the COVID-19 pandemic, all of ESPN Radio's commentators for the 2020 postseason called the games off of monitors at the ESPN studios in Bristol, Connecticut.

==== 2010s ====
Year	Series	Network	Play-by-play	Color commentator
2019	Houston Astros/Tampa Bay Rays	ESPN	Dave Flemming	Jim Bowden
2019	New York Yankees/Minnesota Twins	ESPN	Dan Shulman	Chris Singleton
2018	Boston Red Sox/New York Yankees	ESPN	Jon Sciambi	Jessica Mendoza
2018	Houston Astros/Cleveland Indians	ESPN	Dave Flemming	Jim Bowden
2017	Cleveland Indians/New York Yankees	ESPN	Jon Sciambi	Chris Singleton
2017	Houston Astros/Boston Red Sox	ESPN	Chris Berman	Rick Sutcliffe
2016	Texas Rangers/Toronto Blue Jays	ESPN	Chris Berman (in Arlington); Michael Kay (in Toronto)	Rick Sutcliffe
2016	Cleveland Indians/Boston Red Sox	ESPN	Jon Sciambi	Chris Singleton
2015	Kansas City Royals/Houston Astros	ESPN	Dave O’Brien	John Kruk
2015	Toronto Blue Jays/Texas Rangers	ESPN	Chris Berman (Games 1–2); Dave Flemming (in Arlington); Dan Shulman (Game 5)	Rick Sutcliffe
2014	Los Angeles Angels of Anaheim/Kansas City Royals	ESPN	Jon Sciambi	Chris Singleton
2014	Baltimore Orioles/Detroit Tigers	ESPN	Chris Berman (in Baltimore); Dave Flemming (in Detroit)	Rick Sutcliffe
2013	Oakland Athletics/Detroit Tigers	ESPN	Michael Kay	Aaron Boone
2013	Boston Red Sox/Tampa Bay Rays	ESPN	Jon Sciambi	Chris Singleton
2012	New York Yankees/Baltimore Orioles	ESPN	Dan Shulman	Orel Hershiser
2012	Oakland Athletics/Detroit Tigers	ESPN	Dave O’Brien	Aaron Boone
2011	New York Yankees/Detroit Tigers	ESPN	Dan Shulman	Orel Hershiser
2011	Texas Rangers/Tampa Bay Rays	ESPN	Gary Cohen	Aaron Boone
2010	Tampa Bay Rays/Texas Rangers	ESPN	Dan Shulman	Bobby Valentine
2010	Minnesota Twins/New York Yankees	ESPN	Jon Miller	Orel Hershiser

==== 2000s ====
Year	Series	Network(s)	Play-by-play	Color commentator
2009	New York Yankees/Minnesota Twins	ESPN	Jon Miller	Steve Phillips
2009	Los Angeles Angels of Anaheim/Boston Red Sox	ESPN	Dan Shulman	Dave Campbell
2008	Los Angeles Angels of Anaheim/Boston Red Sox	ESPN	Dan Shulman	Dave Campbell
2008	Chicago White Sox/Tampa Bay Rays	ESPN	Gary Thorne	Chris Singleton
2007	Cleveland Indians/New York Yankees	ESPN	Jon Miller	Dusty Baker
2007	Boston Red Sox/Los Angeles Angels of Anaheim	ESPN	Dan Shulman	Dave Campbell
2006	New York Yankees/Detroit Tigers	ESPN	Jon Sciambi	Buck Martinez
2006	Minnesota Twins/Oakland Athletics	ESPN	Gary Thorne	Steve Stone
2005	Chicago White Sox/Boston Red Sox	ESPN	Jon Sciambi	Buck Martinez
2005	Los Angeles Angels of Anaheim/New York Yankees	ESPN	Dan Shulman	Dave Campbell
2004	Anaheim Angels/Boston Red Sox	ESPN	John Rooney	Buck Martinez
2004	New York Yankees/Minnesota Twins	ESPN	Dan Shulman	Dave Campbell
2003	New York Yankees/Minnesota Twins	ESPN	Dan Shulman	Dave Campbell
2003	Oakland Athletics/Boston Red Sox	ESPN	John Rooney	Buck Martinez
2002	New York Yankees/Anaheim Angels	ESPN	Dan Shulman	Dave Campbell
2002	Oakland Athletics/Minnesota Twins	ESPN	John Rooney	Buck Martinez
2001	New York Yankees/Oakland Athletics	ESPN	Dan Shulman	Rob Dibble
2001	Seattle Mariners/Cleveland Indians	ESPN	Ernie Harwell	Buck Martinez
2000	Oakland Athletics/New York Yankees	ESPN	Dan Shulman	Buck Martinez
2000	Chicago White Sox/Seattle Mariners	ESPN	Ernie Harwell	Dave Campbell

==== 1990s ====
Year	Series	Network	Play-by-play	Color commentator
1999	New York Yankees/Texas Rangers	ESPN	Dan Shulman	Buck Martinez
1999	Cleveland Indians/Boston Red Sox	ESPN	Ernie Harwell	Dave Campbell
1998	New York Yankees/Texas Rangers	ESPN	Dan Shulman	Buck Martinez
1998	Cleveland Indians/Boston Red Sox	ESPN	Ernie Harwell	Dave Campbell
1997	Cleveland Indians/New York Yankees	CBS	Ernie Harwell	Jeff Torborg
1997	Baltimore Orioles/Seattle Mariners	CBS	John Rooney	Al Downing
1996	Texas Rangers/New York Yankees	CBS	Gary Cohen	Jim Hunter
1996	Cleveland Indians/Baltimore Orioles	CBS	Ernie Harwell	Rick Cerone
1995	Seattle Mariners/New York Yankees	CBS	Ernie Harwell	Al Downing
1995	Cleveland Indians/Boston Red Sox	CBS	John Rooney	Jeff Torborg

==== 1981 ====
Year	Series	Network	Play-by-play	Color commentator
1981	Oakland Athletics/Kansas City Royals	CBS	Ned Martin	Bill White
1981	New York Yankees/Milwaukee Brewers	CBS	Ernie Harwell	Curt Gowdy

=== Local ===
==== 2000s ====
Year	Series	Flagship station	Play-by-play #1	Play-by-play #2	Color commentator(s)
2002	New York Yankees/Anaheim Angels	WCBS–AM (New York); KLAC (Anaheim)	John Sterling; Rory Markas	Charley Steiner; Terry Smith	
2002	New York Yankees/Anaheim Angels	WCBS–AM (New York); KLAC (Anaheim)	John Sterling; Rory Markas	Charley Steiner; Terry Smith	
2002	Oakland Athletics/Minnesota Twins				

==== 1990s ====
Year	Series	Flagship station	Play-by-play #1	Play-by-play #2	Color commentator(s)
1997	Cleveland Indians/New York Yankees	WKNR (Cleveland)	Herb Score	Tom Hamilton	
1997	Cleveland Indians/New York Yankees	WABC (New York)	John Sterling	Michael Kay	
1997	Baltimore Orioles/Seattle Mariners	WBAL (Baltimore); KIRO (Seattle)			
1997	Baltimore Orioles/Seattle Mariners	WBAL (Baltimore); KIRO (Seattle)			
1995	Seattle Mariners/New York Yankees	KIRO (Seattle); WABC (New York)			
1995	Seattle Mariners/New York Yankees	KIRO (Seattle); WABC (New York)			
1995	Cleveland Indians/Boston Red Sox	WKNR (Cleveland)	Herb Score	Tom Hamilton	
1995	Cleveland Indians/Boston Red Sox	WEEI (Boston)			
