= List of National League Division Series broadcasters =

The following is a list of the national television and radio networks and announcers that have broadcast the National League Division Series. It does not include any announcers who may have appeared on local radio broadcasts produced by the participating teams.

== Television ==
=== 2020s ===
Year	Series	Network	Play-by-play	Color commentator(s)	Field reporter(s)
2026	Milwaukee Brewers/San Diego Padres	FS1/Fox One	Adam Amin	A. J. Pierzynski and Adam Wainwright	Tom Verducci
2026	Los Angeles Dodgers/Atlanta Braves	Fox/Fox One (Game 1)	Joe Davis (Games 1–2); Kenny Albert (Game 3); Brandon Gaudin (Game 4)	John Smoltz	Ken Rosenthal
2026	Los Angeles Dodgers/Atlanta Braves	FS1/Fox One (Games 2–4)	Joe Davis (Games 1–2); Kenny Albert (Game 3); Brandon Gaudin (Game 4)	John Smoltz	Ken Rosenthal
2025	Milwaukee Brewers/Chicago Cubs	TBS/TruTV/HBO Max	Alex Faust	Ron Darling	Lauren Jbara
2025	Philadelphia Phillies/Los Angeles Dodgers	TBS/TruTV/HBO Max	Brian Anderson	Jeff Francoeur	Lauren Shehadi
2024	Los Angeles Dodgers/San Diego Padres	FS1 (Games 1–4)	Joe Davis	John Smoltz	Ken Rosenthal and Tom Verducci (Game 5)
2024	Los Angeles Dodgers/San Diego Padres	Fox (Game 5)	Joe Davis	John Smoltz	Ken Rosenthal and Tom Verducci (Game 5)
2024	Philadelphia Phillies/New York Mets	Fox (Game 1)	Adam Amin	A. J. Pierzynski and Adam Wainwright	Tom Verducci
2024	Philadelphia Phillies/New York Mets	FS1 (Games 2–4)	Adam Amin	A. J. Pierzynski and Adam Wainwright	Tom Verducci
2023	Atlanta Braves/Philadelphia Phillies	TBS/TruTV/Max	Brian Anderson	Jeff Francoeur	Matt Winer
2023	Los Angeles Dodgers/Arizona Diamondbacks	TBS/TruTV/Max	Bob Costas	Ron Darling	Lauren Shehadi
2022	Los Angeles Dodgers/San Diego Padres	FS1	Adam Amin	A. J. Pierzynski	Tom Verducci
2022	Atlanta Braves/Philadelphia Phillies	Fox (Games 1–2)	Joe Davis	John Smoltz	Ken Rosenthal
2022	Atlanta Braves/Philadelphia Phillies	FS1 (Games 3–4)	Joe Davis	John Smoltz	Ken Rosenthal
2021	San Francisco Giants/Los Angeles Dodgers	TBS	Brian Anderson	Ron Darling	Lauren Shehadi
2021	Milwaukee Brewers/Atlanta Braves	TBS	Don Orsillo	Jeff Francoeur	Matt Winer
2020	Los Angeles Dodgers/San Diego Padres	FS1 (Games 1–2)	Joe Davis	John Smoltz	Ken Rosenthal
2020	Los Angeles Dodgers/San Diego Padres	MLB Network (Game 3)	Matt Vasgersian	John Smoltz	Jon Paul Morosi
2020	Atlanta Braves/Miami Marlins	FS1 (Games 1, 3)	Adam Amin	A. J. Pierzynski and Adam Wainwright	Tom Verducci
2020	Atlanta Braves/Miami Marlins	MLB Network (Game 2)	Matt Vasgersian	Jim Kaat and Buck Showalter	Tom Verducci

==== Notes ====
- 2026 – Kenny Albert (Game 3) and Brandon Gaudin (Game 4) filled in for Joe Davis during the Los Angeles Dodgers–Atlanta Braves series due to illness.

=== 2010s ===
Year	Series	Network	Play-by-play	Color commentator(s)	Field reporter(s)
2019	Los Angeles Dodgers/Washington Nationals	TBS	Ernie Johnson	Jeff Francoeur	Alex Chappell
2019	Atlanta Braves/St. Louis Cardinals	TBS	Brian Anderson	Ron Darling	Lauren Shehadi
2018	Milwaukee Brewers/Colorado Rockies	FS1 (Games 1-3)	Kenny Albert	David Cone and A. J. Pierzynski	Jon Paul Morosi
2018	Milwaukee Brewers/Colorado Rockies	MLB Network (Game 2)	Bob Costas	Jim Kaat	Jon Paul Morosi
2018	Los Angeles Dodgers/Atlanta Braves	MLB Network (Game 1)	Bob Costas	John Smoltz	Tom Verducci
2018	Los Angeles Dodgers/Atlanta Braves	FS1 (Games 2–4)	Joe Davis	John Smoltz	Ken Rosenthal and Tom Verducci
2017	Los Angeles Dodgers/Arizona Diamondbacks	TBS	Brian Anderson	Dennis Eckersley and Joe Simpson	Lauren Shehadi
2017	Washington Nationals/Chicago Cubs	TBS	Ernie Johnson	Ron Darling	Sam Ryan
2016	Chicago Cubs/San Francisco Giants	FS1 (Games 1, 3–4)	Matt Vasgersian	John Smoltz	Ken Rosenthal
2016	Chicago Cubs/San Francisco Giants	MLB Network (Game 2)	Bob Costas	John Smoltz	Ken Rosenthal
2016	Washington Nationals/Los Angeles Dodgers	FS1 (Games 1–2, 4–5)	Kenny Albert	Harold Reynolds and Tom Verducci	Jon Paul Morosi
2016	Washington Nationals/Los Angeles Dodgers	MLB Network (Game 3)	Bob Costas	Jim Kaat	Jon Paul Morosi
2015	St. Louis Cardinals/Chicago Cubs	TBS	Brian Anderson	Dennis Eckersley and Joe Simpson	Matt Winer
2015	Los Angeles Dodgers/New York Mets	TBS	Ernie Johnson	Ron Darling and Cal Ripken	Sam Ryan
2014	Washington Nationals/San Francisco Giants	FS1 (Games 1–2, 4)	Matt Vasgersian	John Smoltz	Jon Paul Morosi
2014	Washington Nationals/San Francisco Giants	MLB Network (Game 3)	Matt Vasgersian	John Smoltz	Sam Ryan
2014	Los Angeles Dodgers/St. Louis Cardinals	FS1 (Games 1, 3–4)	Joe Buck	Harold Reynolds and Tom Verducci	Ken Rosenthal; Erin Andrews (Games 1, 4)
2014	Los Angeles Dodgers/St. Louis Cardinals	MLB Network (Game 2)	Bob Costas	Harold Reynolds and Tom Verducci	Ken Rosenthal
2013	Atlanta Braves/Los Angeles Dodgers	TBS	Ernie Johnson	Ron Darling and Cal Ripken	Craig Sager
2013	St. Louis Cardinals/Pittsburgh Pirates	TBS (Games 1, 3–5)	Dick Stockton	Bob Brenly	Matt Winer
2013	St. Louis Cardinals/Pittsburgh Pirates	MLB Network (Game 2)	Bob Costas	Jim Kaat	Sam Ryan
2012	Cincinnati Reds/San Francisco Giants	TBS (Game 1, 3–5)	Brian Anderson	Ron Darling and Joe Simpson	Tom Verducci
2012	Cincinnati Reds/San Francisco Giants	TNT (Game 2)	Brian Anderson	Ron Darling and Joe Simpson	Tom Verducci
2012	Washington Nationals/St. Louis Cardinals	TBS (Games 1–2, 4–5)	Dick Stockton	Bob Brenly	David Aldridge
2012	Washington Nationals/St. Louis Cardinals	MLB Network (Game 3)	Bob Costas	Jim Kaat	Sam Ryan
2011	Milwaukee Brewers/Arizona Diamondbacks	TBS (Games 1–2, 4–5)	Victor Rojas	Joe Simpson	Sam Ryan
2011	Milwaukee Brewers/Arizona Diamondbacks	TNT (Game 3)	Victor Rojas	Joe Simpson	Sam Ryan
2011	Philadelphia Phillies/St. Louis Cardinals	TBS	Dick Stockton	Bob Brenly (Games 1–4); Ron Darling and John Smoltz (Game 5)	Craig Sager
2010	Philadelphia Phillies/Cincinnati Reds	TBS	Brian Anderson	Joe Simpson	David Aldridge
2010	San Francisco Giants/Atlanta Braves	TBS	Dick Stockton	Bob Brenly	Tom Verducci

==== Notes ====
- TNT was scheduled to air three entire Division Series games in 2011 due to conflicts with TBS. On October 1, it aired Game 2 of the Tampa Bay Rays vs. the Texas Rangers at 7 p.m. ET, which overlapped with the end of Game 1 of the St. Louis Cardinals vs. the Philadelphia Phillies and the continuation of Game 1 of the Detroit Tigers vs. the New York Yankees on TBS. (The latter was also to have been Game 2, but Game 1 was suspended after 1 1/2 innings due to rain.) On October 2, it aired the rescheduled Game 2 between the Tigers and the Yankees at 3 p.m. ET, two hours before Game 2 of the Arizona Diamondbacks vs. the Milwaukee Brewers on TBS. On October 4, it aired Game 3 of the Diamondbacks vs. the Brewers at 9:30 p.m. ET, one hour after Game 3 of the Tigers vs. the Yankees started on TBS.
- For the 2012 and 2013 seasons, TBS has been awarded the rights to televise both Wild Card Playoff games that occur on the day before the Division Series games. In exchange, MLB Network has been awarded the rights to televise two of the Division Series games that previously belonged to TBS.
- Beginning in 2014, when Fox Sports began a new television contract with Major League Baseball, FS1 airs 40 regular season MLB games (mostly on Saturdays), along with up to 15 post-season games (eight Divisional Series games and one best-of-7 League Championship Series). The deal resulted in a reduction of MLB coverage on the Fox network, which will air 12 regular season games, the All-Star Game, and the World Series.

=== 2000s ===
Year	Series	Network	Play-by-play	Color commentator(s)	Field reporter(s)
2009	Los Angeles Dodgers/St. Louis Cardinals	TBS	Dick Stockton	Bob Brenly	Tom Verducci
2009	Philadelphia Phillies/Colorado Rockies	TBS	Brian Anderson	Joe Simpson	David Aldridge
2008	Chicago Cubs/Los Angeles Dodgers	TBS	Dick Stockton	Ron Darling and Tony Gwynn	Tom Verducci
2008	Philadelphia Phillies/Milwaukee Brewers	TBS	Brian Anderson	Joe Simpson and John Smoltz	David Aldridge
2007	Arizona Diamondbacks/Chicago Cubs	TBS	Dick Stockton	Ron Darling	Marc Fein
2007	Philadelphia Phillies/Colorado Rockies	TBS	Don Orsillo	Joe Simpson	David Aldridge
2006	New York Mets/Los Angeles Dodgers	ESPN (Game 1)	Gary Thorne	Joe Morgan and Steve Phillips	
2006	New York Mets/Los Angeles Dodgers	Fox (Games 2–3)	Thom Brennaman	Steve Lyons (Game 2); Tim McCarver (Game 3)	
2006	San Diego Padres/St. Louis Cardinals	ESPN (in San Diego); ESPN2 (Game 3)	Chris Berman (in San Diego); Jon Miller (Game 3)	Orel Hershiser (in San Diego); Joe Morgan (Game 3)	
2006	San Diego Padres/St. Louis Cardinals	Fox (Game 4)	Thom Brennaman	Tim McCarver	
2005	St. Louis Cardinals/San Diego Padres	ESPN (Games 1, 3)	Jon Miller	Joe Morgan	
2005	St. Louis Cardinals/San Diego Padres	ESPN2 (Game 2)	Dave O'Brien	Steve Phillips and Eric Karros	
2005	Atlanta Braves/Houston Astros	ESPN (Games 1, 4)	Dave O'Brien	Steve Phillips and Eric Karros (Game 1); Rick Sutcliffe (Game 4)	
2005	Atlanta Braves/Houston Astros	Fox (Games 2–3)	Thom Brennaman (Game 2); Josh Lewin (Game 3)	Steve Lyons	
2004	St. Louis Cardinals/Los Angeles Dodgers	ESPN (Game 1)	Jon Miller	Joe Morgan	
2004	St. Louis Cardinals/Los Angeles Dodgers	Fox (Games 2–4)	Joe Buck (Game 2); Thom Brennaman (in Los Angeles)	Tim McCarver	
2004	Atlanta Braves/Houston Astros	ESPN (Games 1–2, 4); ESPN2 (Game 3)	Dave O'Brien (Games 1–3); Jon Miller (Game 4)	Jeff Brantley and David Justice (Games 1–3); Joe Morgan (Game 4)	
2004	Atlanta Braves/Houston Astros	Fox (Game 5)	Josh Lewin	Steve Lyons	
2003	San Francisco Giants/Florida Marlins	ESPN (in San Francisco); ESPN2 (in Florida)	Chris Berman (Games 1–3); Dave O'Brien (Game 4)	Rick Sutcliffe and Tony Gwynn	
2003	Atlanta Braves/Chicago Cubs	Fox (Games 1, 4–5)	Thom Brennaman	Steve Lyons (Games 1, 4); Tim McCarver (Game 5)	
2003	Atlanta Braves/Chicago Cubs	ESPN (Games 2–3)	Jon Miller	Joe Morgan	
2002	Atlanta Braves/San Francisco Giants	ABC Family (Game 1)	Dave O'Brien	Tony Gwynn	
2002	Atlanta Braves/San Francisco Giants	Fox (Games 2, 4–5); FX (Game 3)	Thom Brennaman (Games 2, 4); Josh Lewin (Game 3); Joe Buck (Game 5)	Steve Lyons (Games 2–4); Tim McCarver (Game 5)	
2002	Arizona Diamondbacks/St. Louis Cardinals	ABC Family	Chris Berman (in Arizona); Jon Miller (in St. Louis)	Rick Sutcliffe (in Arizona); Joe Morgan (in St. Louis)	
2001	Arizona Diamondbacks/St. Louis Cardinals	Fox Family (Games 1–4)	Thom Brennaman (Games 1–2); Joe Buck (Games 3–5)	Steve Lyons (Games 1–2); Tim McCarver (Games 3–5)	
2001	Arizona Diamondbacks/St. Louis Cardinals	Fox (Game 5)	Thom Brennaman (Games 1–2); Joe Buck (Games 3–5)	Steve Lyons (Games 1–2); Tim McCarver (Games 3–5)	
2001	Houston Astros/Atlanta Braves	Fox Family (in Houston)	Kenny Albert	Rod Allen	
2001	Houston Astros/Atlanta Braves	Fox (in Atlanta)	Mel Proctor	Rod Allen	
2000	San Francisco Giants/New York Mets	ESPN (Games 1, 4)	Jon Miller	Joe Morgan	
2000	San Francisco Giants/New York Mets	Fox (Games 2–3)	Thom Brennaman (Game 2); Joe Buck (Game 3)	Bob Brenly (Game 2); Tim McCarver (Game 3)	
2000	St. Louis Cardinals/Atlanta Braves	ESPN	Jon Miller	Buck Martinez (Games 1, 3); Joe Morgan (Game 2)	

==== Notes ====
- ABC Family's coverage of the 2002 Division Series was produced by ESPN. The reason that games were on ABC Family instead of ESPN was because The Walt Disney Company (ESPN's parent company) bought Fox Family from News Corporation. The ABC Family/ESPN inherited Division Series package was included in Fox's then exclusive television contract with Major League Baseball (initiated in 2001). ABC Family had no other choice but to fulfill the contract handed to them. The only usage of the ABC Family "bug" was for a ten-second period when returning from a commercial break (in the lower right corner of the screen).
- During the 2006 League Division Series on ESPN, Joe Morgan left Game 1 of the Dodgers-Mets series after six innings in order to call Game 2 of the Tigers-Yankees game that same night (October 4). However, the latter game was ultimately rained out.
- Turner Sports provided a provisional plan in which if a League Division Series game televised on TBS ran into the start of the next LDS game scheduled to air on TBS, then TNT would provide supplementary coverage of the latter games' early moments. To be more specific, all games in the Division Series round were presented back-to-back, with each game scheduled for a 3 1/2-hour window. If a game exceeded this window, the first pitch of the next game would be switched to TNT. If a game ended within 3 1/2 hours, the studio team would return for interstitial programming.
  - In 2007, TBS switched the starts of four games to TNT in the Division Series round because the previous games exceeded the time limit. TNT was also scheduled to air Game 4 of the Diamondbacks-Cubs series, which overlapped with Game 3 of the Red Sox-Angels series, but the former game was not played; the night before, the D-Backs completed a three-game sweep of the Cubs.

=== 1990s ===
Year	Series	Network	Play-by-play	Color commentator(s)	Field reporter(s)
1999	Atlanta Braves/Houston Astros	ESPN	Jon Miller	Rick Sutcliffe (Games 1, 3–4); Joe Morgan (Game 2)	
1999	Arizona Diamondbacks/New York Mets	ESPN (in Arizona); ESPN2 (Game 4)	Chris Berman	Ray Knight and Buck Martinez	
1999	Arizona Diamondbacks/New York Mets	NBC (Game 3)	Bob Costas	Joe Morgan	
1998	Houston Astros/San Diego Padres	ESPN (Games 1–3)	Jon Miller	Joe Morgan (in Houston); Ray Knight (Game 3)	
1998	Houston Astros/San Diego Padres	Fox (Game 4)	Thom Brennaman	Bob Brenly	
1998	Atlanta Braves/Chicago Cubs	ESPN (Game 1)	Jon Miller	Joe Carter	
1998	Atlanta Braves/Chicago Cubs	Fox (Game 2)	Thom Brennaman	Bob Brenly	
1998	Atlanta Braves/Chicago Cubs	NBC (Game 3)	Bob Costas	Joe Morgan	
1997	San Francisco Giants/Florida Marlins	ESPN (in Florida)	Chris Berman	Ray Knight	
1997	San Francisco Giants/Florida Marlins	NBC (in San Francisco)	Bob Costas	Joe Morgan and Bob Uecker	
1997	Houston Astros/Atlanta Braves	ESPN	Jon Miller	Joe Morgan (Game 1); Reggie Jackson (Games 2–3)	
1996	San Diego Padres/St. Louis Cardinals	ESPN (in St. Louis)	Chris Berman	Buck Martinez	
1996	San Diego Padres/St. Louis Cardinals	NBC (in San Diego)	Bob Costas	Joe Morgan and Bob Uecker	
1996	Atlanta Braves/Los Angeles Dodgers	ESPN (Game 1)	Chris Berman	Buck Martinez	
1996	Atlanta Braves/Los Angeles Dodgers	Fox (Games 2–3)	Joe Buck	Tim McCarver	Chip Caray and Dave Winfield (Game 2)
1995	Atlanta Braves/Colorado Rockies	NBC (in Denver)	Pete Van Wieren (Games 1–3); Al Michaels (Game 4)	Larry Dierker (Games 1–3); Jim Palmer and Tim McCarver (Game 4)	
1995	Atlanta Braves/Colorado Rockies	ABC (in Atlanta)	Pete Van Wieren (Games 1–3); Al Michaels (Game 4)	Larry Dierker (Games 1–3); Jim Palmer and Tim McCarver (Game 4)	
1995	Cincinnati Reds/Los Angeles Dodgers	NBC (in Los Angeles)	Greg Gumbel	Joe Morgan	
1995	Cincinnati Reds/Los Angeles Dodgers	ABC (in Cincinnati)	Al Michaels	Jim Palmer and Tim McCarver	

==== Notes ====
- 1995 marked the only year of postseason coverage provided by "The Baseball Network", which was a revenue sharing joint venture between Major League Baseball, ABC and NBC. "The Baseball Network" was also scheduled to cover the Division Series in 1994, but plans were scrapped when a strike caused the postseason to be canceled. All games in the first two rounds (including the League Championship Series) were scheduled in the same time slot for regional telecasts. Initially, under the alternating six-year plan, ABC would've covered the Division Series in even numbered years (as well as the World Series in even numbered years) while NBC would've covered the Division Series in odd numbered years (in even numbered years, they would've gotten the rights to the All-Star Game and League Championship Series).
- From 1996–2000, NBC aired LDS games on Tuesday/Friday/Saturday nights. Fox aired LDS games on Wednesday/Thursday nights, Saturdays in the late afternoon, plus Sunday/Monday nights (if necessary). Meanwhile, ESPN carried many afternoon LDS contests. At this point, all playoff games were nationally televised (mostly in unopposed timeslots).

=== 1981 ===
Year	Series	Network	Play-by-play	Color commentator(s)
1981	Los Angeles Dodgers/Houston Astros	NBC	Joe Garagiola	Tony Kubek
1981	Montreal Expos/Philadelphia Phillies	NBC	Dick Enberg	Tom Seaver

==== Notes ====
- In 1981, as means to recoup revenue lost during a players' strike, Major League Baseball set up a special additional playoff round (as a prelude to the League Championship Series). ABC televised the American League Division Series while NBC televised the National League Division Series. The Division Series round was not officially instituted until 14 years later. Games 1, 3 and 5 of the Phillies/Expos series and Games 2–3 and 5 of the Dodgers/Astros series were regionally televised.

== Radio ==
=== National ===
==== 2020s ====
Year	Series	Network	Play-by-play	Color commentator(s)
2026	Milwaukee Brewers/San Diego Padres	ESPN	Jon Sciambi	Doug Glanville
2026	Los Angeles Dodgers/Atlanta Braves	ESPN	Dave O'Brien	Jessica Mendoza
2025	Milwaukee Brewers/Chicago Cubs	ESPN	Jon Sciambi	Doug Glanville
2025	Philadelphia Phillies/Los Angeles Dodgers	ESPN	Dave O'Brien	Jessica Mendoza
2024	Los Angeles Dodgers/San Diego Padres	ESPN	Roxy Bernstein	Jessica Mendoza
2024	Philadelphia Phillies/New York Mets	ESPN	Jon Sciambi	Doug Glanville
2023	Atlanta Braves/Philadelphia Phillies	ESPN	Jon Sciambi	Doug Glanville
2023	Los Angeles Dodgers/Arizona Diamondbacks	ESPN	Roxy Bernstein	Jessica Mendoza
2022	Los Angeles Dodgers/San Diego Padres	ESPN	Jon Sciambi	Doug Glanville
2022	Atlanta Braves/Philadelphia Phillies	ESPN	Karl Ravech	Tim Kurkjian
2021	San Francisco Giants/Los Angeles Dodgers	ESPN	Jon Sciambi	Kyle Peterson
2021	Milwaukee Brewers/Atlanta Braves	ESPN	Karl Ravech	Tim Kurkjian
2020	Los Angeles Dodgers/San Diego Padres	ESPN	Jon Sciambi	Kyle Peterson
2020	Atlanta Braves/Miami Marlins	ESPN	Karl Ravech	Tim Kurkjian

===== Notes =====
- Due to health and safety concerns related to the COVID-19 pandemic, all of ESPN Radio's commentators for the 2020 postseason called the games at the ESPN studios in Bristol, Connecticut.

==== 2010s ====
Year	Series	Network	Play-by-play	Color commentator
2019	Los Angeles Dodgers/Washington Nationals	ESPN	Jon Sciambi	Jessica Mendoza
2019	Atlanta Braves/St. Louis Cardinals	ESPN	Chris Berman (Games 1–2, 4–5); Adam Amin (Game 3)	Rick Sutcliffe
2018	Milwaukee Brewers/Colorado Rockies	ESPN	Dan Shulman	Chris Singleton
2018	Los Angeles Dodgers/Atlanta Braves	ESPN	Chris Berman	Rick Sutcliffe
2017	Los Angeles Dodgers/Arizona Diamondbacks	ESPN	Dan Shulman	Aaron Boone
2017	Washington Nationals/Chicago Cubs	ESPN	Dave Flemming	Jessica Mendoza
2016	Chicago Cubs/San Francisco Giants	ESPN	Dan Shulman	Aaron Boone
2016	Washington Nationals/Los Angeles Dodgers	ESPN	Dave O'Brien	Jim Bowden
2015	St. Louis Cardinals/Chicago Cubs	ESPN	Dan Shulman	Aaron Boone
2015	Los Angeles Dodgers/New York Mets	ESPN	Jon Sciambi	Chris Singleton
2014	Washington Nationals/San Francisco Giants	ESPN	Dave O'Brien	John Kruk
2014	Los Angeles Dodgers/St. Louis Cardinals	ESPN	Dan Shulman	Aaron Boone
2013	Atlanta Braves/Los Angeles Dodgers	ESPN	Dan Shulman	Orel Hershiser
2013	St. Louis Cardinals/Pittsburgh Pirates	ESPN	Dave Flemming	Rick Sutcliffe
2012	Cincinnati Reds/San Francisco Giants	ESPN	Gary Cohen (Games 1–2); Chris Berman (Games 3–5)	Rick Sutcliffe
2012	Washington Nationals/St. Louis Cardinals	ESPN	Jon Sciambi	Chris Singleton
2011	Milwaukee Brewers/Arizona Diamondbacks	ESPN	Dave O'Brien (Games 1–2); Chris Berman (Games 3–5)	Rick Sutcliffe (Games 1–4); Buck Martinez (Game 5)
2011	Philadelphia Phillies/St. Louis Cardinals	ESPN	Jon Sciambi	Chris Singleton
2010	Philadelphia Phillies/Cincinnati Reds	ESPN	Jon Sciambi	Dave Campbell
2010	San Francisco Giants/Atlanta Braves	ESPN	Chris Berman (Games 1–2); Dave O'Brien (Game 3–4)	Rick Sutcliffe

==== 2000s ====
Year	Series	Network	Play-by-play	Color commentator
2009	Los Angeles Dodgers/St. Louis Cardinals	ESPN	Jon Sciambi	Aaron Boone
2009	Philadelphia Phillies/Colorado Rockies	ESPN	Chris Berman (in Philadelphia); Gary Thorne (in Denver)	Rick Sutcliffe (in Philadelphia); Chris Singleton (in Denver)
2008	Chicago Cubs/Los Angeles Dodgers	ESPN	Jon Miller	Rick Sutcliffe (in Chicago); Robin Ventura (in Los Angeles)
2008	Philadelphia Phillies/Milwaukee Brewers	ESPN	Michael Kay	Steve Phillips
2007	Arizona Diamondbacks/Chicago Cubs	ESPN	Jon Sciambi	Buck Martinez
2007	Philadelphia Phillies/Colorado Rockies	ESPN	Gary Thorne	Steve Phillips
2006	New York Mets/Los Angeles Dodgers	ESPN	Dan Shulman	Dave Campbell
2006	San Diego Padres/St. Louis Cardinals	ESPN	Wayne Hagin	Luis Gonzalez
2005	St. Louis Cardinals/San Diego Padres	ESPN	Gary Cohen	Luis Gonzalez
2005	Atlanta Braves/Houston Astros	ESPN	Jim Durham	John Franco
2004	St. Louis Cardinals/Los Angeles Dodgers	ESPN	Gary Cohen	Luis Gonzalez
2004	Atlanta Braves/Houston Astros	ESPN	Jim Durham	Rich Aurilia
2003	San Francisco Giants/Florida Marlins	ESPN	Jim Durham	Joe Girardi
2003	Atlanta Braves/Chicago Cubs	ESPN	Gary Cohen	Luis Gonzalez
2002	Atlanta Braves/San Francisco Giants	ESPN	Gary Cohen	Rob Dibble
2002	Arizona Diamondbacks/St. Louis Cardinals	ESPN	Jim Durham	Buck Showalter
2001	Arizona Diamondbacks/St. Louis Cardinals	ESPN	Charley Steiner	Dave Campbell
2001	Houston Astros/Atlanta Braves	ESPN	Wayne Hagin	Buck Showalter
2000	San Francisco Giants/New York Mets	ESPN	Charley Steiner	Dave Campbell
2000	St. Louis Cardinals/Atlanta Braves	ESPN	Wayne Hagin	Mark Grace

==== 1990s ====
Year	Series	Network	Play-by-play	Color commentator
1999	Atlanta Braves/Houston Astros	ESPN	Jim Durham	Mark Grace
1999	Arizona Diamondbacks/New York Mets	ESPN	Charley Steiner	Dusty Baker
1998	Houston Astros/San Diego Padres	ESPN	Charley Steiner	Rick Sutcliffe
1998	Atlanta Braves/Chicago Cubs	ESPN	Gary Cohen	Kevin Kennedy
1997	San Francisco Giants/Florida Marlins	CBS	Jerry Coleman	Hank Greenwald
1997	Houston Astros/Atlanta Braves	CBS	Gene Elston	Gary Cohen
1996	San Diego Padres/St. Louis Cardinals	CBS	Gene Elston	Gary Cohen
1996	Atlanta Braves/Los Angeles Dodgers	CBS	Jerry Coleman	Jim Hunter
1995	Atlanta Braves/Colorado Rockies	CBS	Gene Elston	Gary Cohen
1995	Cincinnati Reds/Los Angeles Dodgers	CBS	Jerry Coleman	Jim Hunter

==== 1981 ====
Year	Series	Network	Play-by-play	Color commentator(s)
1981	Los Angeles Dodgers/Houston Astros	CBS	Jerry Coleman	Sparky Anderson
1981	Montreal Expos/Philadelphia Phillies	CBS	Jack Buck	Joe Torre

=== Local ===
==== 2000s ====
Year	Series	Flagship station	Play-by-play #1	Play-by-play #2	Color commentator(s)
2002	Atlanta-San Francisco	WSB-AM (Atlanta)	Pete Van Wieren	Skip Caray	Don Sutton and Joe Simpson
2002	Atlanta-San Francisco	KNBR (San Francisco)	Duane Kuiper	Joe Angel	Mike Krukow
2002	Arizona-St. Louis	KTAR-AM (Arizona)	Greg Schulte	Jeff Munn	Rod Allen and Jim Traber
2002	Arizona-St. Louis	KMOX-AM (St. Louis)	Mike Shannon	Joel Meyers	
2001	Arizona-St. Louis	KMOX-AM (Arizona)	Greg Schulte	Jeff Munn	Jim Traber; Rod Allen (Games 4–5)
2001	Arizona-St. Louis	KMOX-AM (St. Louis)	Jack Buck (in St. Louis); Mike Shannon (in Arizona)	Mike Shannon (in St. Louis); Dan McLaughlin (in Arizona)	
2001	Atlanta-Houston	KTRH-AM (Houston)	Milo Hamilton	Alan Ashby	
2001	Atlanta-Houston	WSB-AM (Atlanta)	Pete Van Wieren	Skip Caray	Don Sutton and Joe Simpson

===== Notes =====
- 2001 - Locally, the Arizona-St. Louis portion of the 2001 NLDS was called on KTAR-AM in Phoenix by Greg Schulte, Jeff Munn, Rod Allen (Games 4–5) and Jim Traber, and on KMOX-AM in St. Louis by Jack Buck (Games 3–4), Mike Shannon, and Dan McLaughlin (Games 1–2, 5), while the Atlanta-Houston portion of the 2001 NLDS was called on WSB-AM in Atlanta by Pete Van Wieren, Skip Caray, Don Sutton, and Joe Simpson, and on KTRH-AM in Houston by Milo Hamilton and Alan Ashby.
