= 2013 National League Division Series =

American baseball games

Teams
Team (Wins)		Manager	Season
St. Louis Cardinals (3)		Mike Matheny	97–65 (.599), GA: 3
Pittsburgh Pirates (2)		Clint Hurdle	94–68 (.580), GB: 3
- Dates: October 3–9
- Television: TBS (Games 1, 3–5); MLB Network (Game 2)
- TV announcers: Dick Stockton, Bob Brenly and Matt Winer (TBS); Bob Costas, Jim Kaat and Sam Ryan (MLBN)
- Radio: ESPN
- Radio announcers: Dave Flemming and Rick Sutcliffe
- Umpires: Jerry Layne (crew chief), Jim Joyce, Sam Holbrook, Paul Nauert, Wally Bell, Tony Randazzo

Teams
Team (Wins)		Manager	Season
Los Angeles Dodgers (3)		Don Mattingly	92–70 (.568), GA: 11
Atlanta Braves (1)		Fredi González	96–66 (.593), GA: 10
- Dates: October 3–7
- Television: TBS
- TV announcers: Ernie Johnson, Ron Darling, Cal Ripken Jr. and Craig Sager
- Radio: ESPN
- Radio announcers: Dan Shulman and Orel Hershiser
- Umpires: John Hirschbeck (crew chief), Laz Diaz, Marvin Hudson, Bill Miller, Tim Welke, Hunter Wendelstedt
- NLWC: Pittsburgh Pirates defeated Cincinnati Reds, 6–2

The 2013 National League Division Series were two best-of-five playoff series on the National League side in Major League Baseball's 2013 postseason to determine the teams to participate in the 2013 National League Championship Series. The three divisional winners (seeded 1-3 based on record) and a fourth team — the winner of a one-game Wild Card playoff — played in two series. TBS carried most of the games, with some on MLB Network.

These matchups were:

- (1) St. Louis Cardinals (NL Central champions) vs. (4) Pittsburgh Pirates (Wild Card Game winner): Cardinals won the series, 3–2.
- (2) Atlanta Braves (NL East champions) vs. (3) Los Angeles Dodgers (NL West champions): Dodgers won the series, 3–1.

The higher seeded team in each series hosts Games 1, 2, and 5 (if necessary), and the lower seeded team hosts Games 3 and 4 (if necessary).

The Pirates made their first postseason appearance since 1992, and their first appearance in the Division Series in franchise history (and only one as of 2025).

The Cardinals would go on to defeat the Dodgers in the NLCS, then lose the 2013 World Series to the American League champion Boston Red Sox.

== Matchups ==
=== St. Louis Cardinals vs. Pittsburgh Pirates ===
St. Louis won the series, 3–2.

Game	Date	Score	Location	Time	Attendance
1	October 3	Pittsburgh Pirates – 1, St. Louis Cardinals – 9	Busch Stadium	2:57	45,693
2	October 4	Pittsburgh Pirates – 7, St. Louis Cardinals – 1	Busch Stadium	3:03	45,999
3	October 6	St. Louis Cardinals – 3, Pittsburgh Pirates – 5	PNC Park	2:58	40,489
4	October 7	St. Louis Cardinals – 2, Pittsburgh Pirates – 1	PNC Park	2:36	40,493
5	October 9	Pittsburgh Pirates – 1, St. Louis Cardinals – 6	Busch Stadium	2:40	47,231

=== Atlanta Braves vs. Los Angeles Dodgers ===
Los Angeles won the series, 3–1.

Game	Date	Score	Location	Time	Attendance
1	October 3	Los Angeles Dodgers – 6, Atlanta Braves – 1	Turner Field	3:24	43,021
2	October 4	Los Angeles Dodgers – 3, Atlanta Braves – 4	Turner Field	3:29	48,966
3	October 6	Atlanta Braves – 6, Los Angeles Dodgers – 13	Dodger Stadium	4:01	54,646
4	October 7	Atlanta Braves – 3, Los Angeles Dodgers – 4	Dodger Stadium	3:19	54,438

== Pittsburgh vs. St. Louis ==
This was the first postseason meeting between the current National League Central division rivals St. Louis and Pittsburgh.

=== Game 1 ===
October 3, 2013 4:07 pm (CDT) at Busch Stadium in St. Louis, Missouri 85 °F (29 °C), partly cloudy
Team	1	2	3	4	5	6	7	8	9	R	H	E
Pittsburgh	0	0	0	0	1	0	0	0	0	1	4	3
St. Louis	0	0	7	0	1	1	0	0	X	9	10	0
WP: Adam Wainwright (1–0) LP: A. J. Burnett (0–1); Home runs: PIT: Pedro Álvarez (1); STL: Carlos Beltrán (1); Attendance: 45,693; Boxscore

The Cardinals set a new NLDS record with seven runs in the third inning. Adam Wainwright drew a leadoff walk, then Matt Carpenter singled before Carlos Beltrán's towering three-run home run (443 feet (135 m)), his 15th in post-season play tying Babe Ruth for eighth place on the list, put the Cardinals up 3–0. Only Derek Jeter (20) and Albert Pujols (18) among active players have more. A double, hit-by-pitch and walk loaded the bases before Jon Jay walked to force in another run, then David Freese cleared the bases with a single aided by an error to knock starter A. J. Burnett out of the game. Pedro Alvarez's leadoff home run in the fifth off Wainwright provided the only run for the Pirates. The Cardinals added a run in the bottom of the inning off Jeanmar Gomez on Daniel Descalso's forceout with runners on first and second aided by an error. Next inning Matt Adams walked with two outs before scoring the Cardinals' last run on Yadier Molina's double. Wainwright pitches seven innings allowing just one run, three hits while striking out nine. Carlos Martinez and Trevor Rosenthal pitched a scoreless eighth and ninth respectively as the Cardinals took a 1–0 series lead.

=== Game 2 ===
October 4, 2013 12:07 pm (CDT) at Busch Stadium in St. Louis, Missouri 86 °F (30 °C), mostly cloudy
Team	1	2	3	4	5	6	7	8	9	R	H	E
Pittsburgh	0	1	2	0	2	0	1	1	0	7	10	0
St. Louis	0	0	0	0	1	0	0	0	0	1	4	1
WP: Gerrit Cole (1–0) LP: Lance Lynn (0–1); Home runs: PIT: Pedro Álvarez (2), Starling Marte (1); STL: Yadier Molina (1); Attendance: 45,999; Boxscore

The Pirates scored first with two outs in the second inning off Lance Lynn as Gerrit Cole drove in Pedro Álvarez with a single after Jordy Mercer was intentionally walked. Alvarez hit his second home run of the series in the third, a two-run line drive. The Pirates added to their lead in the fifth when Justin Morneau doubled with one out and scored on Marlon Byrd's double. After Alvarez walked, Seth Maness relieved Lynn and Russell Martin plated Byrd with a single. The Cardinals got on the board with a home run from Yadier Molina in the bottom of the fifth off Gerrit Cole. It was his third post-season home run. The Pirates added to their lead in the seventh inning as Martin plated Byrd again, this time via a sacrifice fly off Kevin Siegrist, then Starling Marte's lead off home run next inning off Shelby Miller capped the game's scoring at 7–1. Cole pitched six innings and three relievers held the Cardinals scoreless in the last three innings as the Pirates tied the series heading to Pittsburgh.

=== Game 3 ===
October 6, 2013 4:37 pm (EDT) at PNC Park in Pittsburgh, Pennsylvania 84 °F (29 °C), mostly clear
Team	1	2	3	4	5	6	7	8	9	R	H	E
St. Louis	0	0	0	0	2	0	0	1	0	3	7	1
Pittsburgh	2	0	0	0	0	1	0	2	X	5	8	0
WP: Mark Melancon (1–0) LP: Carlos Martínez (0–1) Sv: Jason Grilli (1); Home runs: STL: Carlos Beltrán (2); PIT: None; Attendance: 40,489; Boxscore

The Pirates opened up their first non-Wild Card postseason home game in 21 years by scoring two runs in the first inning on Marlon Byrd's single with runners on second and third off Joe Kelly. The Cardinals tied the game in the fifth with a two-out two-run single by Carlos Beltrán off Francisco Liriano. The Pirates loaded the bases with one out in the sixth on a double and two walks off Kelly, who was relieved by Seth Maness, and took the lead on Russell Martin's sacrifice fly. Beltran's home run in the eighth off Mark Melancon tied the game again. The home run was Beltran's 16th playoff home run, which moved him past Babe Ruth for eighth place in postseason history. In the bottom of the inning, the Pirates got two on with one out off Carlos Martinez, who was relieved by Kevin Siegrist. Back-to-back RBI singles by Pedro Alvarez and Martin put the Pirates up 5–3. Jason Grilli pitched a scoreless ninth for the save as the Pirates took a 2–1 series lead. In the four playoff games since this one, the Pirates have failed to score 5 runs yet.

=== Game 4 ===
October 7, 2013 3:07 pm (EDT) at PNC Park in Pittsburgh, Pennsylvania 58 °F (14 °C), cloudy
Team	1	2	3	4	5	6	7	8	9	R	H	E
St. Louis	0	0	0	0	0	2	0	0	0	2	3	0
Pittsburgh	0	0	0	0	0	0	0	1	0	1	1	0
WP: Michael Wacha (1–0) LP: Charlie Morton (0–1) Sv: Trevor Rosenthal (1); Home runs: STL: Matt Holliday (1); PIT: Pedro Álvarez (3); Attendance: 40,493; Boxscore

Game 4 featured a pitching gem from St. Louis Cardinals rookie Michael Wacha. Wacha held the Pirates to just three base runners (one hit, two walks) through 7 1/3 innings pitched. It was the longest no-hitter length by a rookie pitcher since Jeff Tesreau went 5 1/3 innings with no hits allowed for the 1912 New York Giants. Wacha was acquired in the 2012 draft with the 19th overall pick, from the Los Angeles Angels as compensation for losing Albert Pujols. Pedro Alvarez broke up Wacha's no-hitter in the eighth with his third home run of the series. That was the only hit the Pirates got in the whole game. Matt Holliday provided all the runs the Cardinals needed with his two-run homer in the sixth. Charlie Morton, the opposing starting pitcher, went 5 2/3 innings pitched, allowing just those two runs. With the Game 4 win, the Cardinals guaranteed a Game 5, making it the third straight NLDS Game 5 in as many years. Trevor Rosenthal picked up his first career post-season save.

=== Game 5 ===
October 9, 2013 7:07 pm (CDT) at Busch Stadium in St. Louis, Missouri 66 °F (19 °C), mostly clear
Team	1	2	3	4	5	6	7	8	9	R	H	E
Pittsburgh	0	0	0	0	0	0	1	0	0	1	8	1
St. Louis	0	2	0	0	0	1	0	3	X	6	9	0
WP: Adam Wainwright (2–0) LP: Gerrit Cole (1–1); Home runs: PIT: None; STL: David Freese (1), Matt Adams (1); Attendance: 47,231; Boxscore

Game 5 pivoted Game 1 winner Adam Wainwright against the Pirates' rookie and Game 2 winner Gerrit Cole. The Cardinals got on the board first in the bottom of the second inning as Jon Jay walked with two-outs and David Freese broke the tie with a two-run home run. The Cardinals added to their lead in the sixth as Jay singled home Matt Holliday to make it 3–0 off Justin Wilson. The Pirates made some two-out noise in the top of the seventh as Justin Morneau, Marlon Byrd and Pedro Alvarez all singled (the last driving home Morneau), but Wainwright was able to get Russell Martin to ground out to end the threat. As of today, this is the last run the Pirates have scored in the postseason. Entering the bottom of the eighth and with the Cardinals leading 3–1, they put the game out of reach as Matt Adams hit a two-run home run off Mark Melancon to make it 5–1. After allowing a walk and single, Melancon was relieved by Jason Grilli, who allowed an RBI single to Pete Kozma. Wainwright finished the complete game by striking out Alvarez with two runners on base to send the Cardinals to the National League Championship Series against the Los Angeles Dodgers. Wainwright joins John Smoltz as the only pitchers in postseason history with three or more wins as a starter and at least three saves. Adam Wainwright also became the 5th Cardinal to pitch a CG with one ER in a winner-take-all postseason game. This was umpire Wally Bell's final MLB game as he died five days later of a heart attack.

=== Composite line score ===
2013 NLDS (3–2): St. Louis Cardinals over Pittsburgh Pirates

Team	1	2	3	4	5	6	7	8	9	R	H	E
Pittsburgh Pirates	2	1	2	0	3	1	2	4	0	15	31	4
St. Louis Cardinals	0	2	7	0	4	4	0	4	0	21	33	2
Total attendance: 219,905 Average attendance: 43,981

== Los Angeles vs. Atlanta ==
This was the second postseason meeting between the Dodgers and Braves. The Braves previously defeated the Dodgers 3–0 in the 1996 NLDS.

=== Game 1 ===
October 3, 2013 8:07 pm (EDT) at Turner Field in Atlanta, Georgia 75 °F (24 °C), mostly clear
Team	1	2	3	4	5	6	7	8	9	R	H	E
Los Angeles	0	2	2	1	0	1	0	0	0	6	11	0
Atlanta	0	0	0	1	0	0	0	0	0	1	5	0
WP: Clayton Kershaw (1–0) LP: Kris Medlen (0–1); Home runs: LAD: Adrián González (1); ATL: None; Attendance: 43,021; Boxscore

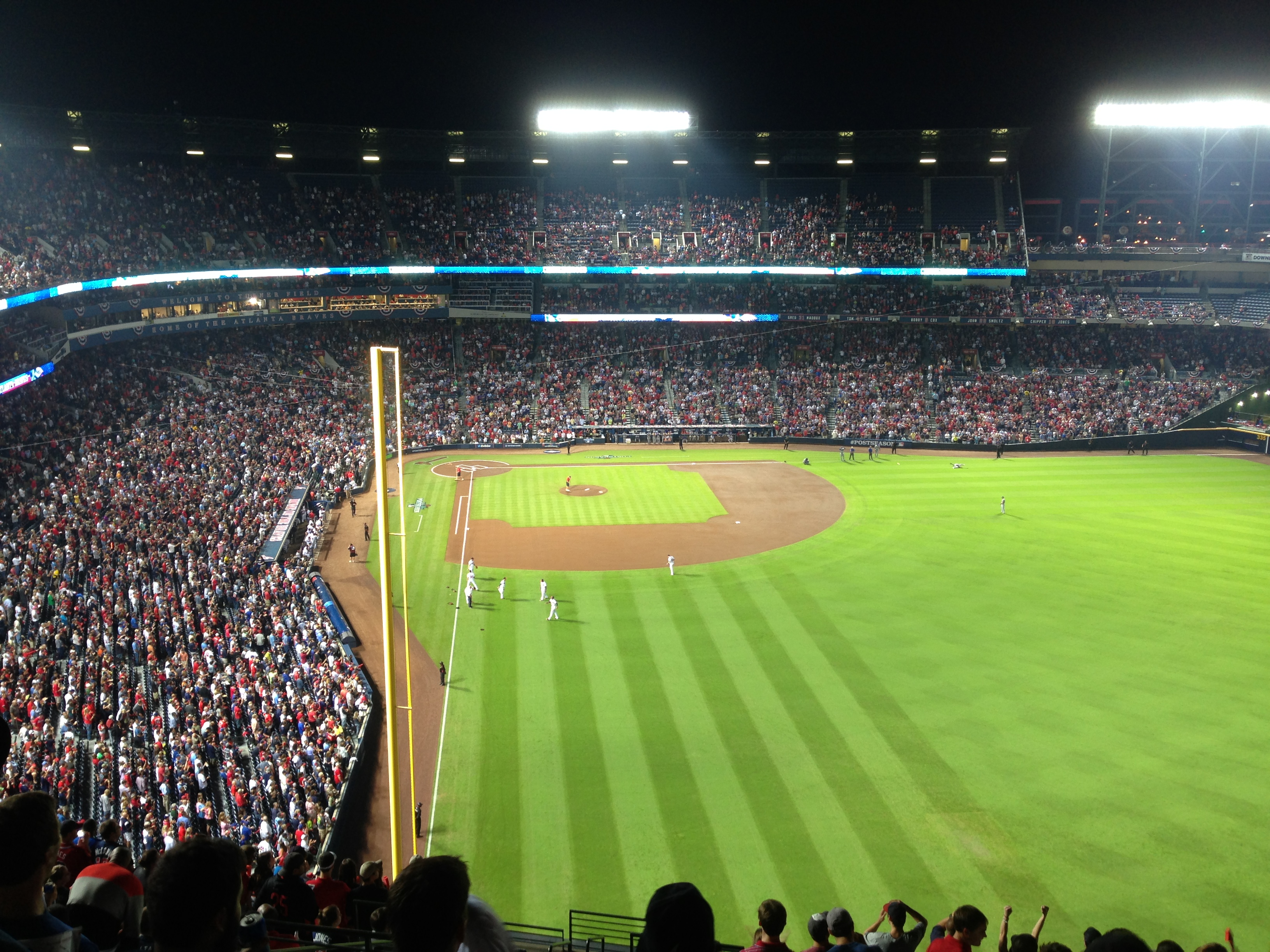
Turner Field during Game 1 of the 2013 NLDS

Game 1 of the series featured a pitching match-up of Kris Medlen against Clayton Kershaw. Kershaw would go on to strike out 12 Atlanta Braves batters in seven innings, while Kris Medlen was forced out after just four innings pitched. Kershaw's 12 strikeouts was the third most strikeouts by a Dodger pitcher in the playoffs, behind only Sandy Koufax (15 in the 1963 World Series) and Carl Erskine (14 in the 1953 World Series). His six straight strikeouts in the game tied an MLB post-season record set by Tim Belcher in game 2 of the 1988 NLCS. Yasiel Puig and Juan Uribe hit one-out singles in the second, then Skip Schumaker's sacrifice fly and A.J. Ellis's double scored a run each. Next inning, Adrián González's two-run home run made it 4–0 Dodgers. Mark Ellis's RBI double next inning made it 5–0 Dodgers. The Braves scored their only run of the game in the bottom of the fourth on Chris Johnson's RBI single with two on. The Dodgers scored their last run in the sixth when Ellis singled with one out off Jordan Walden and scored on Hanley Ramirez's double. Brian Wilson (baseball) and Kenley Jansen pitched a scoreless eighth and ninth, respectively for the Dodgers, who took a 1–0 series lead.

=== Game 2 ===
October 4, 2013 6:07 pm (EDT) at Turner Field in Atlanta, Georgia 82 °F (28 °C), mostly clear
Team	1	2	3	4	5	6	7	8	9	R	H	E
Los Angeles	1	0	0	0	0	0	0	2	0	3	10	0
Atlanta	0	1	0	1	0	0	2	0	X	4	6	0
WP: Mike Minor (1–0) LP: Zack Greinke (0–1) Sv: Craig Kimbrel (1); Home runs: LAD: Hanley Ramírez (1); ATL: None; Attendance: 48,966; Boxscore

In Game 2, the Dodgers struck first when Mark Ellis walked with one out in the first and scored on Hanley Ramírez's double off Mike Minor, but the Braves tied the score in the second when Evan Gattis hit a leadoff single off Zack Greinke and scored on Andrelton Simmons's two-out double. Freddie Freeman doubled to lead off the fourth and scored on Chris Johnson's two-out single to put the Braves up 2–1. In the bottom of the seventh, Brian McCann drew a leadoff walk, then Johnson singled off Chris Withrow. After a sacrifice bunt and strikeout, Paco Rodriguez relieved Withrow and intentionally walked Reed Johnson before Jason Heyward's two-run single made it 4–1 Braves. Ramirez's home run in the eighth after a walk off David Carpenter cut the lead to 4–3. Craig Kimbrel recorded the four out save and the Braves evened the series at one game each. Braves shortstop Andrelton Simmons and Braves catcher Gerald Laird combined for a huge defensive play in the ninth inning throwing out Dodger's base runner Dee Gordon when he attempted to steal second base. This would end up being the final postseason game at Turner Field, as the Braves would not reach the postseason again before moving to SunTrust Park in 2017.

=== Game 3 ===
October 6, 2013 5:07 pm (PDT) at Dodger Stadium in Los Angeles, California 82 °F (28 °C), mostly cloudy
Team	1	2	3	4	5	6	7	8	9	R	H	E
Atlanta	2	0	2	0	0	0	0	0	2	6	10	2
Los Angeles	0	4	2	4	0	0	0	3	X	13	14	0
WP: Chris Capuano (1–0) LP: Julio Teherán (0–1); Home runs: ATL: Jason Heyward (1); LAD: Carl Crawford (1), Juan Uribe (1); Attendance: 54,646; Boxscore

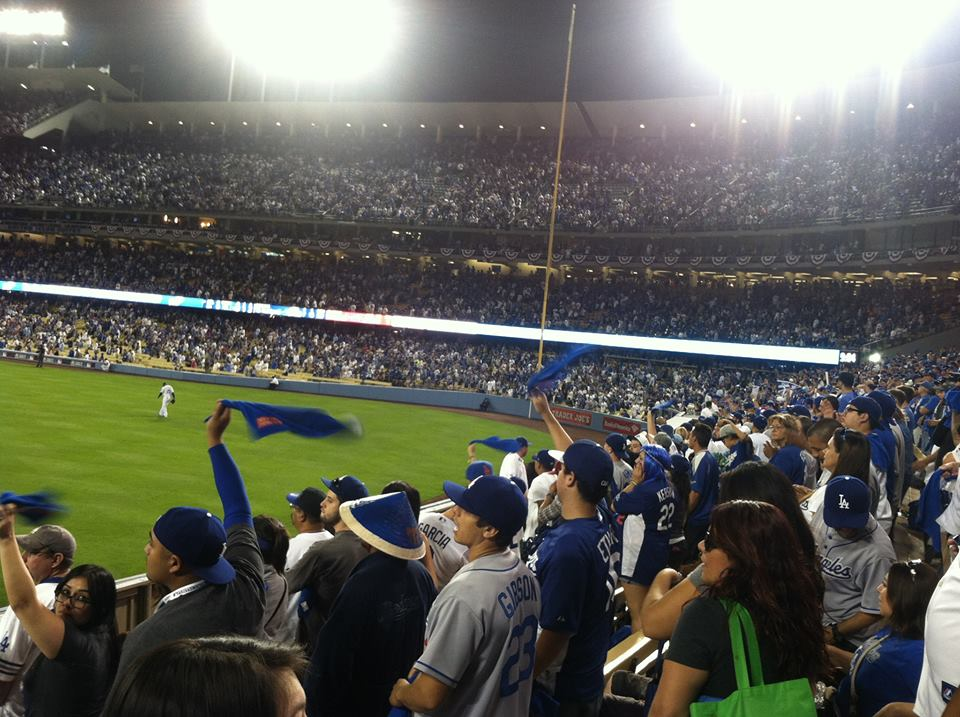
Dodger Stadium during Game 3 of the 2013 NLDS

Game 3 featured two rookies: Hyun-Jin Ryu of the Dodgers and Julio Teherán for the Braves. It was an offensive explosion from both teams in the early innings. In the top of the first, Justin Upton doubled with one out and scored on Evan Gattis's single. After a walk, Gattis scored on Chris Johnson's single. The Dodgers loaded the bases in the second inning on two singles and a walk before Hyun-jin Ryu's sacrifice fly scored a run, then Carl Crawford's three-run home run put them up 4–2. The Braves loaded the bases in the third on three straight leadoff singles before Brian McCann's groundout and Johnson's fielder's choice scored a run each to tie the game. In the bottom of the inning, Hanley Ramírez hit a leadoff double then scored on Adrián González's single. Two outs later, Skip Schumaker's RBI single made it 6–4 Dodgers and knocked Teheran out of the game. The next inning, Carl Crawford reached on an error, then scored on Ramirez's triple off Alex Wood. After González struck out, Ramirez scored on Yasiel Puig's single before Juan Uribe's home run made it 10–4, all four runs were unearned. In the eighth, Ramirez hit an RBI single with two on and two outs off Jordan Walden, who was relieved by Luis Avilan. González and Puig then hit back-to-back RBI singles to make it 13–4. In the ninth, Jason Heyward's two-run home run off Paco Rodriguez made it 13–6 Dodgers. After allowing a walk and single, Rodriguez was relieved by Kenley Jansen, who struck out Brian McCann to end the game and give the Dodgers a 2–1 series lead. Hanley Ramirez continued his torrid NLDS by hitting two more extra base hits, tying a Dodgers franchise record for extra-base hits in a playoff series set by Steve Garvey and Duke Snider. Additionally, the 13 runs scored was a Dodgers record for a playoff game.

At the age of 35 years, Chris Capuano picked up his first career post-season victory with three scoreless innings in relief of Ryu.

=== Game 4 ===
October 7, 2013 6:37 pm (PDT) at Dodger Stadium in Los Angeles, California 71 °F (22 °C), clear
Team	1	2	3	4	5	6	7	8	9	R	H	E
Atlanta	0	0	0	2	0	0	1	0	0	3	7	0
Los Angeles	1	0	1	0	0	0	0	2	X	4	11	2
WP: Brian Wilson (1–0) LP: David Carpenter (0–1) Sv: Kenley Jansen (1); Home runs: ATL: None; LAD: Carl Crawford 2 (3), Juan Uribe (2); Attendance: 54,438; Boxscore

The Dodgers brought Clayton Kershaw back on short rest in Game 4 and he pitched six innings. Carl Crawford hit homers in his first two at-bats off Freddy García in the first and third, the first Dodger to do so in the playoffs since Shawn Green in the 2004 NLDS. The Braves put runners on second and third with one out on a single and error by Adrián González, who committed another error in the first, when Chris Johnson's single and Andrelton Simmons's groundout scored a run each, tying the game, both runs unearned. Elliot Johnson tripled with one out, then an RBI single by José Constanza off Ronald Belisario in the seventh gave the Braves the lead, but the Dodgers went back up on a two-run homer by Juan Uribe in the eighth off David Carpenter. Kenley Jansen struck out the side in the ninth to preserve the 4–3 series clinching victory for the Dodgers.

=== Composite line score ===
2013 NLDS (3–1): Los Angeles Dodgers over Atlanta Braves

Team	1	2	3	4	5	6	7	8	9	R	H	E
Los Angeles Dodgers	2	6	5	5	0	1	0	7	0	26	46	2
Atlanta Braves	2	1	2	4	0	0	3	0	2	14	28	2
Total attendance: 201,071 Average attendance: 50,268

== See also ==
- 2013 American League Division Series
