= Major League Baseball on Fox Family =

- The logo for Fox Family's Thursday night telecasts from 2001.
- Also known as: Fox Family Baseball; Fox Family Baseball Thursday; ESPN Division Series
- Genre: Major League Baseball game telecasts
- Directed by: Doug Freeman; Dave Hagen; Jim Lynch; Larry Meyers; Jeff Mitchell
- Starring: Kenny Albert (2001); Rod Allen (2001); Chris Berman (2002); Thom Brennaman (2001); Joe Buck (2001); Tony Gwynn (2002); Rex Hudler (2001); Josh Lewin (2001); Tim McCarver (2001); Jon Miller (2002); Joe Morgan (2002); Dave O'Brien (2002); Rick Sutcliffe (2002)
- Theme music composer: NJJ Music
- Opening theme: "MLB on Fox theme music"
- Composer: NJJ Music
- Country of origin: United States
- Original language: English
- No. of seasons: 2

Production
- Producers: Jeff Gowan; Pete Macheska; Jerry Weinstein; Jim Zrake; Glenn Diamond
- Production locations: Various Major League Baseball stadiums
- Camera setup: Multi-camera
- Running time: 180 minutes or until game ended
- Production companies: Fox Sports; ESPN

Original release
- Network: Fox Family (2001); ABC Family (2002)
- Release: April 5, 2001 – October 6, 2002

Related
- MLB on Fox; Thursday Night Baseball; MLB on ESPN

Major League Baseball (MLB) games aired on the predecessor networks for the American pay television channel Freeform that aired from April 5, 2001 to October 6, 2002. These began in 2000, when the channel was known as Fox Family Channel, co-owned by News Corporation and Haim Saban, as a replacement for Thursday night games that had aired on Fox Sports Net in prior seasons. The package also included some games in the postseason Division Series. After The Walt Disney Company bought Fox Family in 2001, renaming it to ABC Family, the games were moved to the Disney-owned ESPN channels, although the 2002 Division Series games that had been acquired as part of the purchase remained on ABC Family because of existing contractual obligations. Those games moved to ESPN the following year as well.

== Background ==
In 1997, as part of its contract with Major League Baseball, Fox Sports began to show games on its national network of regional sports networks, Fox Sports Net (FSN), which was given rights to two Thursday night games per week, one for the Eastern and Central time zones and one for the Mountain and Pacific time zones, though these games were often preempted in markets where they conflicted with the FSN affiliate's coverage of a local team.

=== Fox Family's coverage ===
In 2000, the former FSN coverage passed to Fox Family Channel on an alternating basis with then-sister network FX and was reduced to one game per week.

Starting with the 2001 season, Fox Family also carried games from the Division Series that did not air on the Fox broadcast network. Among the games that aired on Fox Family included one between the San Francisco Giants and the Houston Astros on October 4, 2001, in which Barry Bonds hit his 70th home run of the season, tying the all-time single season record that Mark McGwire had set only three years earlier.

==== Commentators ====
Play-by-play announcers for the FSN/Fox Family coverage included Kenny Albert, Thom Brennaman, Chip Caray, Josh Lewin, and Steve Physioc. Color analysts included Bob Brenly, Kevin Kennedy, Steve Lyons, and Jeff Torborg.

Other commentators included:

- Rod Allen (analyst)
- Bert Blyleven (analyst)
- Dick Bremer (play-by-play)
- Joe Buck (play-by-play)
- George Frazier (analyst)
- Kirk Gibson (analyst)
- Keith Hernandez (analyst)
- Rex Hudler (analyst)
- Mike Krukow (analyst)
- Duane Kuiper (play-by-play)
- Tim McCarver (analyst)
- Dan McLaughlin (field reporter)
- Rick Monday (analyst)
- Brianne O'Leary (field reporter)
- Ross Porter (play-by-play)
- Mel Proctor (play-by-play)
- Matt Vasgersian (play-by-play)

==== Regular season schedule (2001) ====
NOTE: The Thursday night telecasts on Fox Family were subject to blackout in the local markets of participating teams.

Date	Teams	Play-by-play	Color commentator(s)	Field reporter(s)
April 5	Boston Red Sox at Baltimore Orioles	Kenny Albert	Steve Lyons	Dan McLaughlin
April 12	Cleveland Indians at Detroit Tigers	Kenny Albert	Kevin Kennedy	
April 19	New York Yankees at Toronto Blue Jays	Kenny Albert	Steve Lyons	
April 26	Anaheim Angels at Cleveland Indians	Steve Physioc	Kevin Kennedy	Dan McLaughlin
May 3	Los Angeles Dodgers at Cincinnati Reds (Dodgers' local feed)	Ross Porter	Rick Monday	
May 10	Seattle Mariners at Boston Red Sox; Florida Marlins at Los Angeles Dodgers	Kenny Albert; Steve Physioc	Jeff Torborg; Steve Lyons	
May 17	St. Louis Cardinals at Pittsburgh Pirates	Kenny Albert	Kevin Kennedy	Dan McLaughlin
May 24	Florida Marlins at New York Mets	Matt Vasgersian	Jeff Torborg	Brianne O'Leary
May 31	Boston Red Sox at Toronto Blue Jays	Kenny Albert	Kevin Kennedy	Brianne O'Leary
June 7	Baltimore Orioles at New York Yankees	Kenny Albert	Kevin Kennedy	
June 14	Cincinnati Reds at Chicago White Sox	Josh Lewin	Kevin Kennedy	
June 21	Minnesota Twins at Cleveland Indians (Twins' local feed)	Dick Bremer	Bert Blyleven	
June 28	Oakland Athletics at Seattle Mariners	Josh Lewin	Kevin Kennedy	
July 5	New York Yankees at Baltimore Orioles	Josh Lewin	Kevin Kennedy	
July 12	Boston Red Sox at New York Mets	Kenny Albert	Kevin Kennedy	
July 19	New York Yankees at Detroit Tigers	Kenny Albert	Kevin Kennedy	
July 26	Toronto Blue Jays at Boston Red Sox	Kenny Albert	Kevin Kennedy	
August 2	Oakland Athletics at Cleveland Indians	Kenny Albert	Kevin Kennedy	
August 9	San Francisco Giants at Cincinnati Reds	Kenny Albert	Kevin Kennedy	
August 16	Seattle Mariners at Boston Red Sox	Josh Lewin	Kevin Kennedy	
August 23	Detroit Tigers at Seattle Mariners	Kenny Albert	Keith Hernandez	
August 27	Boston Red Sox at Cleveland Indians	Josh Lewin	Kevin Kennedy	
September 6	Cleveland Indians at Boston Red Sox	Josh Lewin	Kirk Gibson	
September 20	Houston Astros at San Francisco Giants	Duane Kuiper	Mike Krukow	
September 27	Houston Astros at Chicago Cubs	Josh Lewin	Kevin Kennedy	
October 4	San Francisco Giants at Houston Astros	Josh Lewin	George Frazier	

=== ABC Family ===
After Disney bought Fox Family in 2001 and renamed it ABC Family, the Thursday games were folded into the ESPN Major League Baseball rights package (and subsequently shifted to weekday afternoon "DayGame" broadcasts). However, the Division Series games aired on ABC Family (with ESPN's announcers, graphics, and music) for 2002 because of inherited contractual obligations. The only usage of the ABC Family "bug" was for a ten-second period when returning from a commercial break in the lower right corner of the screen. The following year, the Division Series games also shifted to ESPN.

Game 2 (played on October 2) of the Minnesota Twins–Oakland Athletics playoff series in 2002 started on ESPN2 because the San Francisco Giants–Atlanta Braves game (which started at 1 p.m. Eastern Time) ran over the three-hour time window. The game was eventually switched back to ABC Family once the early game ended.

==== Commentators ====
- Chris Berman (play-by-play)
- Tony Gwynn (analyst)
- Brian Kenny (field reporter)
- Gary Miller (field reporter)
- Jon Miller (play-by-play)
- Joe Morgan (analyst)
- Dave O'Brien (play-by-play)
- Jeremy Schaap (field reporter)
- Mark Schwartz (field reporter)
- Rick Sutcliffe (analyst)

== See also ==
- History of Freeform (TV channel)
  - List of programs broadcast by Freeform
