= Bob Stevens (sportscaster) =

American sportscaster

Bob Stevens (born November 25, 1954) is an American sportscaster, best known as a former anchor on the ESPN family of networks. He was at ESPN from 1995 to 2002.

Stevens graduated from the University of Tulsa in 1977 with a degree in communications. From 1987 to 1990, Stevens was the sports director at KOTV in Tulsa, Oklahoma. From 1990 to 1994, Stevens was the weekend sports anchor for WEWS in Cleveland, Ohio. While he was there, Stevens created a popular show called Sports Sunday, which wrapped up the week in local sports ranging from professional, amateur, and high school. From 1994 to 1996, Stevens worked as the sports director at WEWS, which he continued doing a month into his ESPN duties.

In 1995, Stevens conducted interviews with Jim Thome, Paul Sorrento, Tony Peña, and Julián Tavárez following the Cleveland Indians' series clinching victory in Game 3 of the American League Division Series against the Boston Red Sox for The Baseball Network/ABC.

In 2006, he started announcing Savannah State football games. He has also called football games for the Army Black Knights and also works for the PGA Tour Network.
