= Jim Bowden (baseball) =

American baseball analyst (born 1961)

- Born: May 18, 1961 (age 65); Boston, Massachusetts, U.S.
- Education: Rollins College (BA)
- Occupations: Baseball executive; analyst; broadcaster
- Years active: 1985–present

James Goodwin Bowden IV (born May 18, 1961) is an American baseball analyst, broadcaster and former executive. He is a co-host of SiriusXM's "Inside Pitch" on MLB Network Radio and a columnist for The Athletic. He previously worked for ESPN, writing a blog for ESPN.com titled "The GM's Office". He used to be a host and co-host on Fox Sports Radio, a baseball analyst for FoxSports.com and a Baseball Insider for the Los Angeles Dodgers and Los Angeles Angels for Fox Sports West. He has held positions of senior vice president and general manager for both the Cincinnati Reds and Washington Nationals. On October 16, 1992 he became the youngest general manager in baseball history. He was named MLB Executive of the Year by Baseball America in 1999. Bowden's teams finished in first place in 1994 and 1995. Bowden has also worked in television for ESPN and Fox Sports West as well as local television and radio stations in both Cincinnati and Washington, D.C.

== Early life and career ==
Bowden was born in Boston, Massachusetts and raised in Weston, Massachusetts, and Boothbay Harbor, Maine. He graduated from Rollins College in 1983 with a B.A. degree in communications and business administration. He was the sports director at the college radio station as well doing the play by play for both the baseball and soccer teams. His broadcast partners included Chris "Mad Dog" Russo (Class of 1982). His entry to professional baseball came as an assistant in the Pittsburgh Pirates media relations department in 1985. He was a former college roommate of Squire Galbreath, whose father Dan and grandfather John were the principal owners of the Pirates. General manager Syd Thrift was impressed with Bowden and asked him to join the Pirates' baseball operations department as an administrator. Bowden computerized the Pirates' scouting files, and became a protégé to Thrift. He followed Thrift to the New York Yankees, and eventually moved to the Cincinnati Reds where he was later promoted by the Reds Owner, Marge Schott, to general manager. He also served as team president during her suspension in 1993.

== General manager ==
His first role as a general manager was with the Cincinnati Reds at age 31 in 1992. When he took this position, he was the youngest general manager in the history of Major League Baseball (MLB). Bowden was named Major League Executive of the Year in 1999 by The Sporting News after leading one of the lowest payroll teams in baseball to 96 wins. In 1993 Bowden fired rookie manager Tony Pérez after only 44 games. Perez was a star player in Cincinnati and immensely popular with Reds fans. At the time, it was the earliest firing of a first-year manager in 65 years. The firing drew significant criticism from Cincinnati fans. However, he replaced Perez with Davey Johnson, who went on to lead the Reds to a division title in 1995. In 1998 Bowden traded Jeff Shaw to the Los Angeles Dodgers for infielder Paul Konerko and left-hander Dennys Reyes. This move was met with shock in the Cincinnati area as Shaw, an all-star and Cincinnati native, signed with the Reds at a discounted rate prior to the season. At the time Shaw was quoted as saying "We had a handshake deal that he wasn't going to trade me. Three months later, he traded me ... If I had been in the room with him, I would have killed him." However, the Shaw-Konerko trade turned out to be a lopsided one, with Konerko making six All-Star teams in his career (later with the White Sox). He continued with the Reds until being fired in 2003. Bowden is perhaps best known for his drafting of Joey Votto, Adam Dunn, and Aaron Boone, and his trades for Ken Griffey Jr. Denny Neagle, John Smiley, Kevin Mitchell, Deion Sanders, José Guillén and Alfonso Soriano. He was the first GM to propose the use of Instant Replay in 1992 and also has supported the concept of trading amateur draft picks.

After he was fired by Cincinnati, Bowden worked as a commentator on ESPN before being hired by Major League Baseball to serve as GM of the Montreal Expos, who were soon to become the Washington Nationals, in November 2004. The team acquired players such as Ryan Zimmermann, Alfonso Soriano, Adam Dunn, Josh Willingham, José Guillén, Danny Espinosa, Tyler Clippard, Luis Atilano, Jordan Zimmermann, Chris Marrero and Derek Norris during his tenure.

In 2006, Bowden traded Gary Majewski from the Nationals to the Reds along with Bill Bray, Royce Clayton, and Brendan Harris for Austin Kearns, Felipe López, and Ryan Wagner. The trade caused some controversy, as the Reds front office was apparently unaware of cortisone shots that had been given to Majewski because of arm pain before the trade. It was alleged that Majewski was known to be injured by Bowden and the trade was an attempt to dump him for some value to some unsuspecting team. In his time with the Nationals Majewski was an effective pitcher, with a 2.93 ERA in 2005 and a 3.58 ERA with Washington up until he was traded. With the Reds he had very little success, with a 7.28 ERA in parts of three seasons. He was not re-signed after the 2008 season and to date has not pitched in the major leagues again. A grievance was filed with MLB alleging misconduct by Jim Bowden and the Washington Nationals. MLB has never revealed their findings and no punishment is on record.

In February 2009, it was reported that Bowden along with former special assistant José Rijo were part of an FBI federal investigation into the skimming of signing bonus money from Latin American baseball players. He resigned from the Nationals on March 1, 2009.

== Broadcasting ==
Bowden is a co-host of the Sirius XM Radio show Inside Pitch, which airs on the MLB Network Radio channel. He also is a baseball analyst and insider for ESPN, participating in video shoots and podcasts on ESPN.com, and serves as a substitute analyst for Sunday Night Baseball broadcasts on ESPN Radio.

He has been a host on Fox Sports Radio, a baseball analyst for FoxSports.com, and a baseball insider for both the Los Angeles Dodgers and Los Angeles Angels of Anaheim for Fox Sports West. His broadcasting career has also included appearances for ESPN's Cold Pizza, SportsCenter, ESPNEWS, and Baseball Tonight. He also worked for local television and radio stations in both Cincinnati, Ohio and Washington, D.C., while he was a Major League senior VP and general manager in each respective city for a combined 15 years.
