= MLB Network Showcase =

- Starring: Matt Vasgersian; Tom Verducci; Jon Morosi
- Theme music composer: David Robidoux
- Country of origin: United States

Production
- Running time: 3 hours (approximate)

Original release
- Network: MLB Network
- Release: April 9, 2009 – present

MLB Network Showcase is the title of a presentation of Major League Baseball on cable and satellite channel MLB Network that premiered on April 9, 2009. The network produces in-house 26 non-exclusive live games a season. Since one or both teams' local TV rights holders also carry the games, the MLB Network feed is subject to local blackouts. In that event, the cities in the blacked-out markets will instead see a simulcast of another scheduled game via one team's local TV rights holder. MLB Network Showcase typically airs one game a week.

From 2012–2021, MLB Network aired two exclusive Division Series games using the MLB Network Showcase presentation. Unlike the regular-season games, these games were exclusive to MLB Network. Beginning with the 2022 MLB season, MLB Network instead aired the Spanish language broadcasts for all postseason games carried in English by TBS. Those moved to TUDN in 2024.

== History ==
Prior to the formation of MLB Network, MLB had produced game telecasts in-house for the 1994 and 1995 seasons via The Baseball Network, a joint venture with ABC and NBC. However, the experiment was scuttled by ABC and NBC after the 1995 season due to lackluster ratings in the aftermath of the 1994–95 strike, which had resulted in the cancellation of the remainder of the 1994 season.

From 2009 to 2010, MLB Network broadcast the Civil Rights Game. The 2009 game was broadcast on MLB Network except in the home markets of the two teams that played in the game, Cincinnati (FSN Ohio) and Chicago (CSN Chicago). For the 2010 Civil Rights Game, again, MLB Network telecast the game except in Cincinnati (Fox Sports Ohio) and St. Louis (Fox Sports Midwest).

On July 8, 2011, Al Michaels teamed up with Bob Costas (with the two announcers alternating between play-by-play and color commentary) to call a game between the New York Mets and San Francisco Giants on MLB Network. It was Michaels's first appearance on a baseball telecast since August 6, 2003 (when he served as a guest commentator on an ESPN game at Dodger Stadium between the Los Angeles Dodgers and Cincinnati Reds) and his first as a primary announcer since Game 5 of the 1995 World Series on ABC. (Michaels had called Games 1, 4, and 5 of that series with Jim Palmer and Tim McCarver, while Costas called Games 2, 3, and 6 with Joe Morgan and Bob Uecker for NBC.) Michaels and Costas also made appearances on SportsNet New York and Comcast SportsNet Bay Area during the game's middle innings, since the MLB Network broadcast was blacked out in the Mets' and Giants' respective home markets.

On July 2, 2013, Matt Vasgersian and Sean Casey called the game between the San Francisco Giants and Cincinnati Reds (with Casey being a legend for the latter team), in which Reds pitcher Homer Bailey threw his second career no-hitter.

On September 25, 2014, Costas called Derek Jeter's final game at Yankee Stadium for MLB Network, where he hit an RBI single to win the game.

On July 8, 2016, NHL on NBC broadcaster Mike Emrick called his first MLB regular-season game at PNC Park when the Pirates hosted the Chicago Cubs for MLB Network with Bob Costas. The Pirates won the game, 8–4, with Emrick calling some of the action.

=== Postseason coverage ===
For the 2012 and 2013 seasons, TBS was awarded the rights to televise both Wild Card Games that occurred on the day before the Division Series games. In exchange, MLB Network was awarded the rights to televise two of the Division Series games that previously belonged to TBS. From 2014 to 2021, MLB Network broadcast two Division Series games in lieu of FS1, airing the American League games in odd-numbered years, and National League games in even-numbered years.

The first postseason telecast took place on October 7, 2012 and featured the Detroit Tigers hosting the Oakland Athletics at Comerica Park in Detroit for Game 2 of the 2012 ALDS. Matt Vasgersian called the game alongside analyst Jim Kaat. The second telecast took place on October 10 and featured the Washington Nationals hosting the St. Louis Cardinals at Nationals Park in Washington, D.C., for Game 3 of the 2012 NLDS; this was the Nationals' first home postseason game since moving to Washington at the start of the 2005 season. Bob Costas provided the play-by-play commentary alongside analyst Jim Kaat. Vasgersian and Jim Kaat called Game 3 of the 2013 American League Division Series, also between the Detroit Tigers and the Oakland Athletics on October 7 as well.

In 2017, Bob Costas called Game 1 of the American League Division Series between the Boston Red Sox and the Houston Astros on MLB Network. The Astros went on to win 8–2. Costas and his color commentator Jim Kaat received criticism for their "bantering about minutia" and misidentification of plays. Costas also went on to become an internet meme after using the term the "sacks were juiced" to describe the bases being loaded.

Following Fox's extension of their MLB rights, which included Division Series games for the main Fox network for the first time since 2006, MLB Network lost the rights to playoff games after the 2021 season. To replace this coverage, beginning with the 2022 MLB season, MLB Network instead carried the Spanish language broadcasts for all postseason games broadcast in English by TBS, replacing CNN en Español. This arrangement ended in the 2024 season, with MLB announcing an agreement with TelevisaUnivision to hold Spanish-language rights to the postseason games aired by TNT Sports, along with studio programming.

== Commentators ==
Longtime NBC Sports broadcaster Bob Costas is the main play-by-play voice for the broadcasts. Matt Vasgersian also does play-by-play on some games. Dan Plesac and Tom Verducci provide color commentary.

Siera Santos, CC Sabathia and Chris Young host select special "Clubhouse Edition" broadcasts, which have two former MLB players with Sabathia, Young and Santos to provide a unique look at the featured games.

In a deal announced in September 2022, Melanie Newman and CC Sabathia will host selected games for BBC Sport, these continue to be branded as an MLB Network Showcase broadcast. In 2023, CC Sabathia was replaced by Xavier Scruggs as a game analyst for BBC Sport.
