= Major League Baseball on ESPN Radio =

- Other names: MLB on ESPN Radio
- Genre: American baseball game broadcasts
- Running time: 210 minutes or until game ends (inc. adverts)
- Country of origin: United States
- Language: English
- Home station: ESPN Radio
- TV adaptations: ESPN Major League Baseball; Major League Baseball on ABC
- Starring: Jon Sciambi; Doug Glanville; Marc Kestecher
- Recording studio: Various MLB stadiums (game broadcasts)
- Original release: March 31, 1998 – present
- No. of series: 29
- Audio format: Stereophonic sound

Major League Baseball on ESPN Radio is the brand name for exclusive play-by-play broadcast presentation of Major League Baseball on ESPN Radio. The coverage had most recently been presented by Indeed along with AutoZone for the postseason; previous presenting sponsors included Wendy's, Barbasol, Nesquik, DraftKings, Xerox, AutoZone, Excedrin, United States Postal Service and Mercedes-Benz.

== History ==
Major League Baseball on ESPN Radio logo (2012–2018)

In 1997, ESPN Radio outbid CBS Radio to become the exclusive national radio broadcaster of Major League Baseball beginning the following year. CBS Radio had been the national radio broadcaster since 1976.

The agreement lasted seven years through 2004 and gave ESPN Radio the rights to broadcast numerous games including Sunday Night Baseball, Saturday Game of the Week, Opening Day and holiday games, September weekday pennant race games, the All-Star Game and Home Run Derby, and all of the playoffs, including the World Series.

In 2004, ESPN Radio extended the deal with a five-year, $55 million dollar contract extension through the 2010 season.

The agreement also added a weekly program devoted to baseball, which became The Baseball Show from 3 p.m. ET to 7 pm. ET on Sundays during the regular season. The program was hosted by John Seibel and Steve Phillips.

On February 20, 2025, ESPN announced that it was mutually opting out of its agreement to carry Major League Baseball following the 2025 season. Besides television, this opt out agreement would have also affected ESPN's radio and streaming coverage. However, on November 19, it was announced that ESPN Radio would retain their rights to MLB coverage, including Sunday Night Baseball and the postseason.

=== Coverage overview ===
As previously mentioned, in beginning in the 1998 season, ESPN Radio took over from CBS Radio as the official, national radio broadcaster for Major League Baseball. The network's contract with MLB currently runs through 2028, and as of 2022, Major League Baseball on ESPN Radio is part of ESPN Radio’s main lineup, instead of in an opt-in/opt-out basis as in previous years. However, affiliates retain the ability to opt out of broadcasts involving in-market teams during the regular season.

The games include Opening Day, Sunday Night Baseball, Saturday games (usually the same matchup as the Sunday Night game with case-by-case exceptions, mainly due to start time conflicts), holiday games (during Memorial Day, Independence Day and Labor Day; occasionally broadcast as doubleheaders) and September pennant race games. ESPN Radio holds exclusive radio rights to the All-Star Game and Home Run Derby. The postseason (including the Wild Card Games, Division Series, League Championship Series and World Series) is a semi-exclusive arrangement. The participating teams' flagship stations are allowed to air play-by-play using their own announcers and production. The national ESPN Radio feed may, however, be carried live on another station in those markets as well (for instance, WHB in Kansas City aired the ESPN feed of Kansas City Royals postseason games in 2014 and 2015, competing directly with the Royals Radio Network broadcast on KCSP). If affiliate stations on the teams' radio networks wish to carry coverage of postseason games they must use the national feed. Since the inaugural World Baseball Classic in March 2006, the semi-finals and the championship have also been broadcast as part of Major League Baseball on ESPN Radio. The network also broadcast the MLB at Field of Dreams game in 2021.

In addition to affiliate stations on AM/FM radio, ESPN Radio's game broadcasts are carried as part of Sirius XM Radio's MLB coverage (with Sunday night games and select Saturday and holiday games being simulcast on MLB Network Radio). However, they are not included in the subscription "Gameday Audio" package on MLB.com with the exception of the All-Star Game, for which no other radio play-by-play feed is available.

Since June 2011, the games can also be heard online at ESPN Radio.com and on mobile devices via the ESPN app and other applications such as TuneIn. They can also be heard on televisions using connected devices (such as video game consoles) via their respective iHeartRadio and TuneIn apps. Previously, rights restrictions prevented ESPN Radio.com from live-streaming the games. Despite MLB not enforcing blackouts for radio coverage, game coverage on the ESPN mobile app and TuneIn are restricted to listeners in the United States and that are located outside the markets of both teams involved in that broadcast, regardless if said teams are home or away.

=== Broadcasters ===
As of 2022, the primary ESPN Radio crew for Sunday Night Baseball consists of play-by-play announcer Jon Sciambi and color analyst Doug Glanville. In 2010, Sciambi succeeded Gary Thorne, who had called play-by-play in 2008–09; Thorne had succeeded Dan Shulman, did so from 2002 to 2007; Shulman, in turn, had been preceded by Charley Steiner from 1998 to 2002. Glanville succeeded Chris Singleton, who served as analyst from 2011-2021. Singleton, in turn, succeeded Dave Campbell, who was an analyst from 1999 to 2010. Campbell replaced Kevin Kennedy as analyst in 1999, after the latter had worked with Steiner in the network's inaugural season of coverage. Marc Kestecher currently serves as the network's primary Baseball Tonight studio host, with Jim Basquil or Kevin Winter substituting for him if Kestecher was unavailable due to scheduling conflicts (mainly with his NBA on ESPN Radio play-by-play duties); he was preceded by Joe D'Ambrosio from 1998 to 2007.

For other regular season games (especially Saturday games) as well as select Sunday night games, different play-by-play announcers are used with Glanville remaining as analyst (or, if Ganville is unavailable, a substitute analyst). This is mainly due to Sciambi’s unavailability as he is also the play-by-play announcer for Chicago Cubs games televised on the Marquee Sports Network as well as a backup announcer for Sunday Night Baseball on ESPN television. Backup play-by-play announcers for MLB on ESPN Radio included John Schriffen, Karl Ravech, Mike Couzens, and Roxy Bernstein among others.

Sciambi and Glanville also call the All-Star Game and Home Run Derby each year.

As of 2018, Dan Shulman called the World Series and one of the two League Championship Series with Singleton each year (Jessica Mendoza joined this crew in 2020, while Eduardo Pérez joined in 2021, in place of Singleton, who was co-hosting the pregame and postgame segments with Kevin Winter), while Sciambi calls the other LCS with Mendoza. Various other announcers work the network's secondary regular-season, Wild Card Game and Division Series broadcasts as needed. Starting in the 2023 season, Sciambi would also call the World Series and a League Championship Series, succeeding Shulman in those roles.

For the 2020 season, due to the COVID-19 pandemic, Sciambi and Singleton called each game working remotely, rather than at the ballpark. For the 2020 postseason, they and all of ESPN Radio's announcers called the games from the ESPN studios in Bristol, Connecticut.

== See also ==
- ESPN Major League Baseball
- Major League Baseball on ABC
- Baseball Tonight
- Sunday Night Baseball
- Monday Night Baseball
- Wednesday Night Baseball
- Major League Baseball Game of the Week
- List of ESPN Major League Baseball broadcasters
- List of Major League Baseball on ESPN Radio broadcasters
- List of Major League Baseball on ABC announcers
- List of Major League Baseball All-Star Game broadcasters
- List of American League Division Series broadcasters
- List of National League Division Series broadcasters
- List of American League Championship Series broadcasters
- List of National League Championship Series broadcasters
- List of World Series broadcasters

Records
| Preceded by CBS | Major League Baseball national radio broadcast partner 1998–present | Succeeded by Incumbent |
