= Dan McLaughlin =

American sportscaster

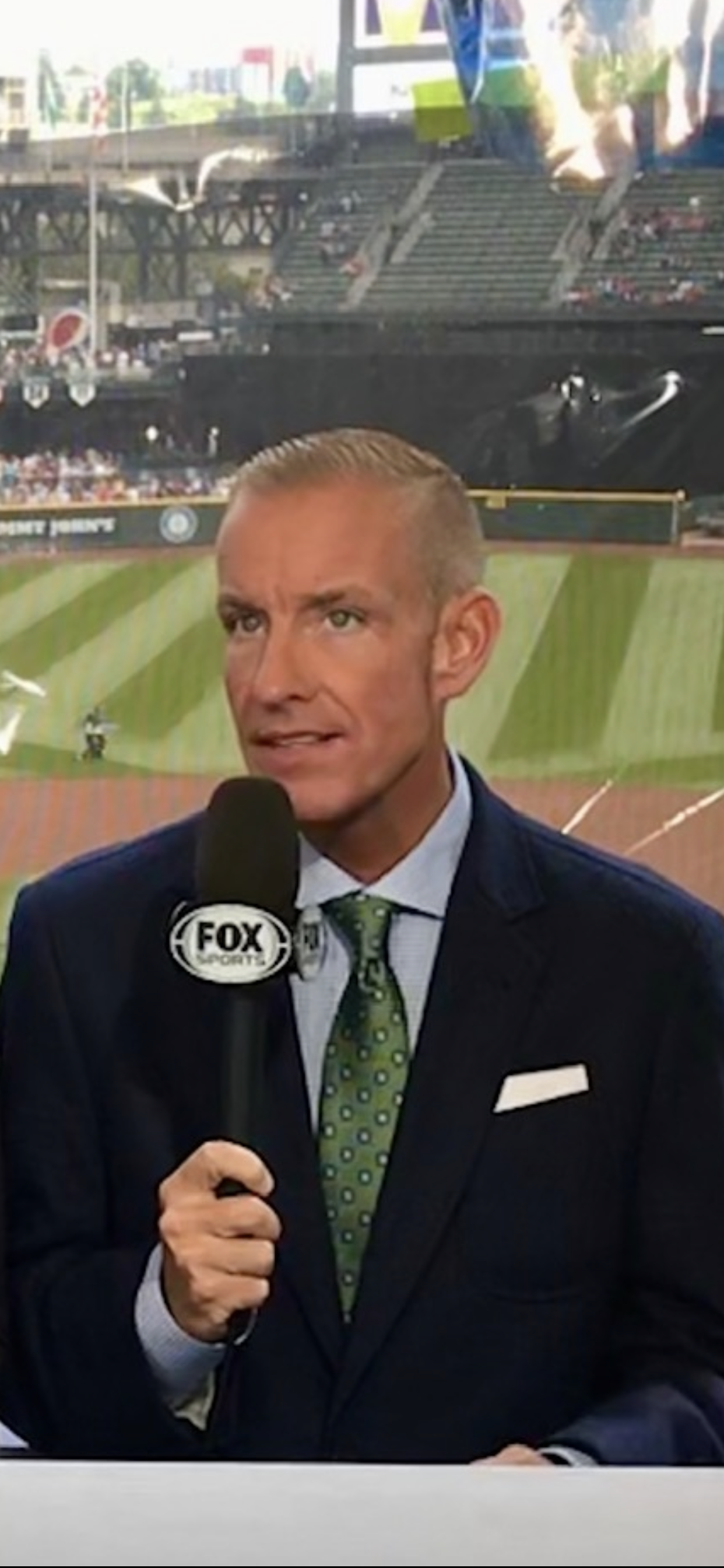
- McLaughlin in booth before a game
- Born: March 18, 1974 (age 51); St. Louis, Missouri, U.S.
- Education: Lindenwood University
- Occupation: Broadcaster
- Spouse: Libby
- Website: https://www.scoopswithdannymac.com/

Daniel Edwin McLaughlin (born March 18, 1974) is a professional sportscaster who is a co-host of Golf with Jay Delsing on ESPN Radio in St. Louis and nationally syndicated. His co-host is former PGA Tour professional, Jay Delsing. Their parent station is 101 ESPN in St. Louis. He also calls baseball games for the Missouri Tigers on SEC Network+. He formerly worked on the St. Louis Cardinals and St. Louis Blues telecasts on the cable television channel Bally Sports Midwest. He also worked as a play-by-play announcer for the NFL on Fox.

== Early life ==
McLaughlin was born on March 18, 1974, in St. Louis, Missouri. He grew up in the St. Louis area where his father was a school teacher. Following his graduation from St. John Vianney High School in suburban Kirkwood, Missouri, McLaughlin attended Lindenwood University in Saint Charles, where he played baseball. Setting his sights on sports broadcasting from an early age, McLaughlin performed a variety of broadcasting duties at university-owned KCLC while a student at Lindenwood.

== Broadcast career ==
While in college, McLaughlin served an internship at KMOX radio in St. Louis, and he became a sports talk show host with the station in 1996. McLaughlin soon found himself as a frequent contributor to St. Louis Blues telecasts on KPLR-TV and FSN Midwest. In 2000, he became the play-by-play broadcaster for FSN's Cardinals games. Additionally, McLaughlin did play-by-play for the Mizzou Tiger and Missouri Valley Conference basketball games and occasional regional college football games for ESPN.

He also owns a media company, Scoops with Danny Mac, where he interviews nationally-known sports figures for both a television show and podcast. Scoops with Danny Mac is known for candid one-on-one interviews between McLaughlin and his subject.

Bally Sports placed McLaughlin on leave in December 2022 following his arrest for persistent driving while intoxicated. Bally Sports announced on December 15, 2022 that McLaughlin would not return to the network.

McLaughlin returned to local radio as a co-host on 101 ESPN radio in St. Louis. He co-hosts Golf with Jay Delsing which airs locally in St. Louis and is nationally syndicated as well. His co-host is former PGA Tour professional Jay Delsing.

== Personal life ==
McLaughlin and his wife, Libby, are the parents of two sons and two daughters. Their daughter Avery is slated to play collegiate golf at Richmond University in the fall of 2025.

=== Battles with alcoholism and depression ===
On August 16, 2010, McLaughlin was arrested on charges of driving while intoxicated. Under a plea agreement, he was allowed to keep his drivers license, but was given two years of probation.

On September 30, 2011, McLaughlin was involved in a one-vehicle crash near his Chesterfield, Missouri, home. Police investigated and arrested McLaughlin on charges of drunk driving and leaving the scene of a crash. Following the second arrest, Fox Sports Midwest suspended McLaughlin indefinitely. In addition to suspension from his job with Fox Sports, McLaughlin lost his regular appearances on KMOX radio. McLaughlin was reinstated by Fox in February 2012 after being treated for alcoholism at a rehab facility. He also returned to KMOX, but in a much more limited role.

On December 4, 2022, McLaughlin was once again arrested in Creve Coeur, Missouri, for driving under the influence. He was charged with persistent driving while intoxicated, a felony offense. On February 10, 2023, McLaughlin pleaded guilty to felony DWI and was referred to treatment court. On February 13, 2023, McLaughlin released a statement on social media detailing his struggles with mental health and alcoholism. In that statement he said "he had been sober for nearly 10 years leading up to December 4, when he was arrested for persistent driving while intoxicated. He added that he was struggling more than usual with depression around the time of his arrest. He talked about the Christmas holidays being a trigger for his depression because of a family issue from his childhood involving alcoholism. That led to him drinking alcohol and taking his prescription medication on an empty stomach that day, which was "a recipe for disaster," he wrote. He has maintained his sobriety since this incident.

== Charitable works ==
The McLaughlins are involved in several St. Louis area charities, including hosting the annual "Dan McLaughlin Charity Golf Tournament and Auction" to benefit special education. All money raised goes directly to help the Special Education Foundation of St. Louis County. To date his tournament has raised over $5 million.
