= Sam Ryan =

American sportscaster (born 1969)

- Born: Samantha Ryan; February 5, 1969 (age 57); Lake Ronkonkoma, New York, U.S.
- Occupation: Sportscaster
- Spouse: Jeff Herbst
- Children: 2

Samantha Ryan (born February 5, 1969) is an American sportscaster who is a sports anchor for WABC-TV New York's Eyewitness News' weekend evening broadcasts.

== Biography ==
=== Early life and education ===
Ryan is an alumna of the New York Institute of Technology and also majored in communications at Hofstra University.

=== Broadcasting career ===
Early in her career, Ryan worked for WBAB Babylon, New York, WVIT Hartford, and WFAN New York. She joined ABC Radio Network in 1996 and then Fox Sports New York in 2000. She started her first stint at WABC-TV ABC in September 2002.

Ryan joined ESPN in 2003, and CBS Sports and WCBS-TV in June 2006. She joined MLB Network as a studio host and reporter in September 2011 and appeared regularly on MLB Network's game productions, The Rundown, Quick Pitch, and other studio programming. She gave on-air reports from the field in the League Championship Series between the Chicago Cubs and Los Angeles Dodgers in 2017 on MLB Network and TBS. Ryan was with MLB Network until June 2018 when she returned to WABC.

== Awards ==
Ryan won a local Emmy Award for "Outstanding Series Feature-soft" in 1999 and a local AP award in 2000.

== Personal life ==
Ryan is married to Jeff Herbst. They have two children together.
