= Bob Brenly =

American baseball player, manager, and commentator (born 1954)

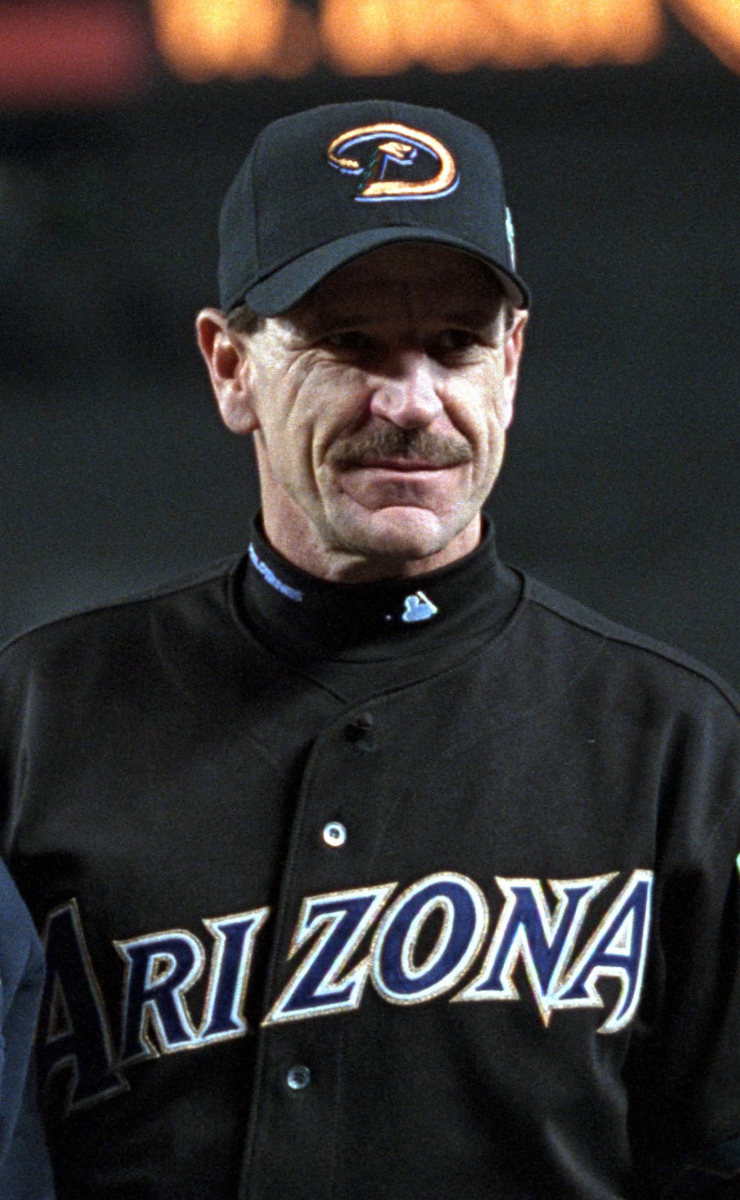
- Brenly during the 2001 World Series
- Catcher / Manager
- Born: February 25, 1954 (age 72); Coshocton, Ohio, U.S.
- Batted: Right Threw: Right

MLB debut
- August 14, 1981, for the San Francisco Giants

Last MLB appearance
- October 1, 1989, for the San Francisco Giants

MLB statistics
- Batting average: .247
- Home runs: 91
- Runs batted in: 333
- Managerial record: 303–262
- Winning %: .536
- Stats at Baseball Reference

Teams
- As player: San Francisco Giants (1981–1988); Toronto Blue Jays (1989); San Francisco Giants (1989); As manager: Arizona Diamondbacks (2001–2004); As coach: San Francisco Giants (1992–1996)

Career highlights and awards
- All-Star (1984); World Series champion (2001); San Francisco Giants Wall of Fame

Robert Earl Brenly (born February 25, 1954) is an American baseball sportscaster and a former professional baseball player, coach and manager. He played the majority of his Major League Baseball (MLB) career as a catcher with the San Francisco Giants. After retiring as a player, Brenly worked as a broadcaster with the Chicago Cubs, then as a coach with the Giants, then as a broadcaster for Fox. He was hired to manage the Arizona Diamondbacks for the 2001 season, and won the franchise's only championship his first year, becoming the fourth rookie manager to win a World Series and first since 1961. In 2004, Brenly was released by the Diamondbacks and again became a broadcaster with the Cubs until 2012. He now serves as a color commentator for Diamondbacks broadcasts.

== Early life ==
Brenly was born on February 25, 1954, in Coshocton, Ohio.

== College career ==
Brenly attended Ohio University in Athens, Ohio, and was a member of the Bobcats baseball team. By the time he graduated in 1976, Brenly had earned All-America honors and matched Hall of Famer Mike Schmidt's school record of 10 home runs in a single college season. Brenly was inducted to the Kermit Blosser Ohio Athletics Hall of Fame in 1987.

== Professional career ==
=== Minor leagues ===
Brenly was not drafted but signed as an amateur free agent by the San Francisco Giants in 1976.

=== San Francisco Giants (1981–1988) ===
Brenly made his major league debut in 1981 at the age of 27. Brenly replaced Milt May as the Giants starting catcher in 1983 and posted a .224 batting average along with 7 home runs and 34 runs batted in. Brenly had his best season offensively in 1984 when, he was hitting for a .318 batting average at mid-season to earn a spot as a reserve player for the National League in the 1984 All-Star game. He finished the season with a career-high .291 batting average with 20 home runs and 80 runs batted in. Brenly won the 1984 Willie Mac Award for his spirit and leadership.

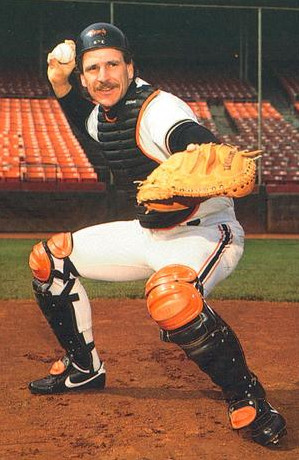
Brenly in 1983

In 1986, Brenly led National League catchers with a .995 fielding percentage, committing only 3 errors as a catcher in 101 games as the Giants improved from last place the previous season to finish third in the National League Western Division. Also in 1986, Brenly broke up a perfect game attempt by pitcher Don Carman on August 20 by leading off the ninth inning with a double.

Although Brenly was a good defensive catcher, he also has the dubious distinction of committing 4 errors in one inning while playing as a substitute third baseman during a game on September 14, 1986, against the Atlanta Braves. Already suited up to catch, he was asked to man third base when the regular player was unavailable. Three errors were on ground balls and one on a throw, with the throwing error coming on the same play as one of the ground ball errors. Brenly atoned for his mistakes by hitting a fifth-inning home run. He then hit a two-out, two-run single in the seventh inning to tie the game and finally hit a walk-off home run in the bottom of the ninth inning to win the game.

Brenly was playing first base during a Giants-Mets game on September 3, 1986, when Keith Hernandez hit a sharp grounder to pitcher Terry Mulholland. The ball got stuck in Mulholland's glove so Mulholland tossed the glove with the baseball to Brenly for the out.

Brenly led National League catchers in 1987 with 83 assists and posted a .267 batting average with 18 home runs and 51 runs batted in as, the Giants won the National League Western Division title. In the only post-season appearance of his career in the 1987 National League Championship Series, Brenly hit .235 with 1 home run and 2 runs batted in as the Giants were defeated by the St. Louis Cardinals in a seven-game series.

During the 1988 season, Brenly caught only 69 games and was released at the end of the season.

=== Toronto Blue Jays (1989) ===
In 1989, Brenly became a free agent and signed a contract to play for the Toronto Blue Jays. After half a season with the Blue Jays, he was released.

=== Return to San Francisco Giants (1989) ===
On July 18, Brenly re-signed to play for the Giants. After 12 more games with the Giants, he retired at the end of the 1989 season at the age of 35.

=== Career statistics ===
In a 9-year career, Brenly played in 871 games, accumulating 647 hits in 2615 at bats for a .247 career batting average along with 91 home runs and 333 runs batted in. He ended his career with a .984 fielding percentage as a catcher.

== Coaching career ==
After serving a year as an analyst in Chicago, Brenly served as a coach for the Giants under manager Roger Craig, beginning in 1992. When Craig was fired at the end of the season in favor of Dusty Baker, Brenly stayed on the staff for three more years.

== Broadcasting career ==
From 1996 to 2000, Brenly worked for Fox alongside Thom Brennaman for Saturday afternoon games and the Division Series, and with Joe Buck and Tim McCarver for the World Series in 1996, 1998, and 2000 to go along with the 1997 and 1999 All-Star Games and the League Championship Series. In 1998, Brenly was hired as a broadcaster for the new expansion team in the Arizona Diamondbacks for Fox Sports Net Arizona. He was at the position for three years, which included broadcasts across national Fox platforms.

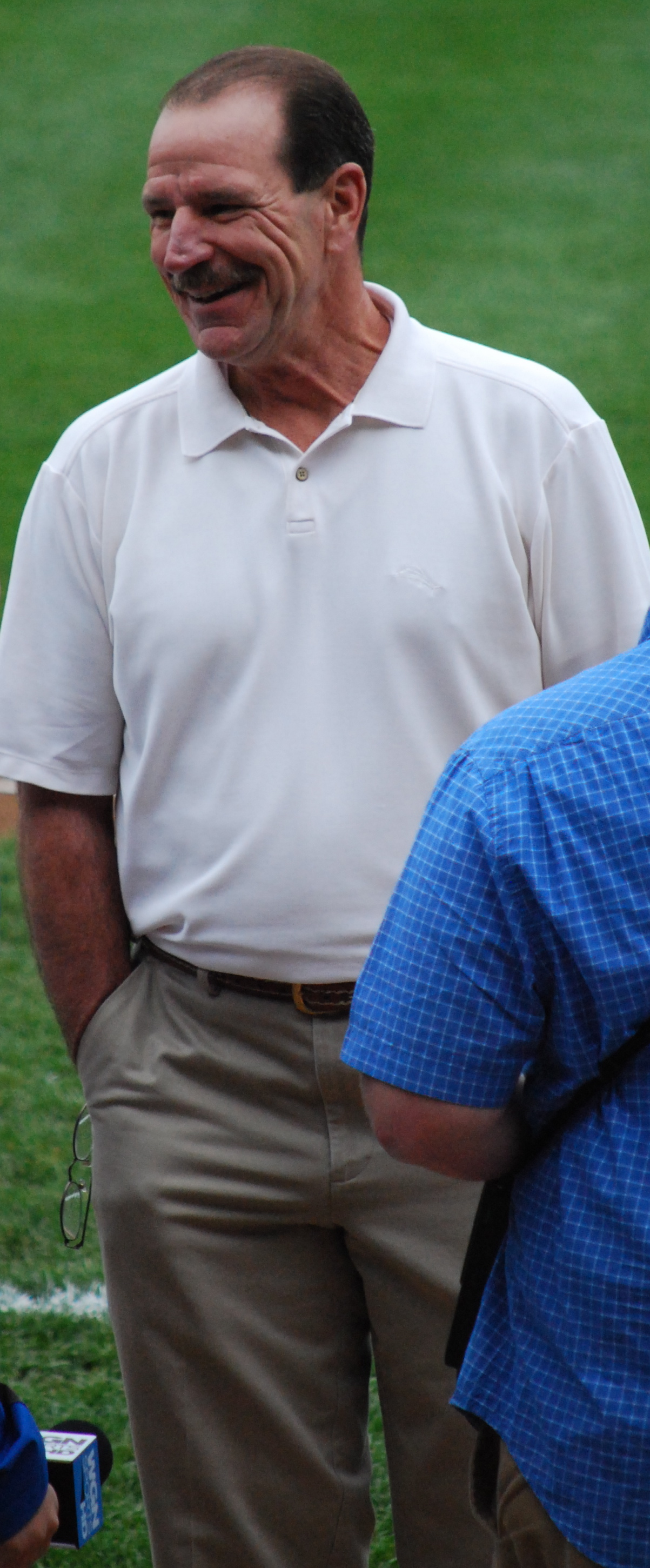
Brenly at Wrigley Field on May 28, 2009

Brenly later returned to being a baseball analyst for Fox after leaving the Diamondbacks managerial position. He was then hired in November 2004 to replace Steve Stone as a color analyst for televised Chicago Cubs games. Brenly teamed with play-by-play announcer Len Kasper. He had previously teamed with Harry Caray, Thom Brennaman, and Ron Santo during the 1990 and 1991 seasons on radio. He often jokes about his mediocre playing career. Brenly is often referred to by his nickname, "BB" and was rumored to be in the running for several managerial positions for the 2008 season, though nothing materialized. Brenly was in the running for the 2009 Milwaukee Brewers managerial position and was said to be the favorite, but the job went to Ken Macha instead.

In 2007, Brenly served as a game analyst during postseason broadcasts on the TBS cable television network. He covered the Yankees–Indians series in the ALDS and the Rockies–Diamondbacks series in the NLCS alongside Chip Caray and Tony Gwynn. On September 13, 2008, Brenly signed a four-year extension worth $3.5 million to continue his role as color analyst for Cubs games.

Brenly again worked Division Series post-season coverage for TBS in 2009-2013 with Dick Stockton as his play-by-play partner each year.

He opted out of an extension to his contract with the Cubs and WGN television on October 17, 2012.

On October 18, 2012, Brenly signed a five-year deal as the TV color commentator for the Diamondbacks. On June 3, 2021, Brenly announced in a statement that he'd be stepping away from broadcasting temporarily to reflect on comments he had made the day before on-air about New York Mets pitcher Marcus Stroman, which Aramis Ramirez said was discriminatory. In June 2022, he was called out by San Diego Padres pitcher Mike Clevinger to "find out who the people are instead of just running his mouth up there", referring to Brenly and his habitual negative comments about the Padres on air, such as suggesting a player could run the bases easier without a "bike chain around his neck" or advocating for Diamondback pitchers to throw at Padre batters during a blowout.

== Managerial career ==
=== Arizona Diamondbacks (2001–2004) ===
The firing of Diamondbacks manager Buck Showalter a day after the 2000 season lent an opportunity for Brenly, who was one of the seven candidates interviewed by Arizona alongside Chris Chambliss, Carlos Tosca, Clint Hurdle, Tom Spencer, Ron Hassey, and Terry Francona; Brenly and Francona were the final two considered. On October 30, he was signed to a three-year, $2 million contract. He was cited by general manager Joe Garagiola Jr and managing partner Jerry Colangelo for his "baseball knowledge, work ethic and attitude", which contrasted with the "micromanaging" Showalter, who had won 250 of 486 games but had failed to reach past the National League Division Series.

With veteran stars such as Luis Gonzalez, Randy Johnson, and Curt Schilling, expectations were good for the team to win when they still had a chance to do so. The Diamondbacks won 92 games in his rookie season, finishing two games ahead of the San Francisco Giants, the defending NL West champion. In the 2001 National League Division Series, they played against the St. Louis Cardinals. The two teams split the first four games before Arizona won on a walk-off by Tony Womack for their first postseason series win. In the 2001 National League Championship Series against the Atlanta Braves, they split the first two games against each other before they rolled the next three games over Atlanta (with Schilling and Johnson winning two of the three games) to clinch the National League pennant. In the 2001 World Series, they were matched against the New York Yankees, who had won the last three World Series matchups and were looking for a four-peat with heavy odds in their favor. As per the tradition of the time for home-field advantage in the World Series having the National League host in odd-number years, Arizona hosted the first two games. They outscored the Yankees 13–1 in those games with Johnson and Schilling coming through with decisive victories.

When the Series shifted to New York, Brenly's team dealt with adversity, with some of it coming at the hands of Brenly. Game 3 saw them held to three hits and one run while New York narrowly won. Schilling was sent out for Game 4, but it was the bullpen that proved noteworthy. With a two-run lead in the eighth inning, closer Byung-hyun Kim was sent out by Brenly to pitch not only the 8th but also the 9th inning. He had a clean 8th, but the lineup in the 9th proved his undoing. Paul O'Neill got on base with one out before Tino Martinez lined a home run to tie the game and send it to extras. Kim was sent out for another inning to try to preserve the tie, but Derek Jeter hit a two-out walk-off home run to tie the series; in total, he had thrown 61 pitches. For Game 5 on the following day, Brenly went to Miguel Batista, who hadn't pitched in twelve days, to the mound as the starter. He had a scoreless 7 2/3 inning performance, and the Diamondbacks had a 2–0 lead going into the 9th inning. Brenly sent out Kim to try to save the game despite what happened the previous night. With two outs and a runner on, Scott Brosius hit a home run to tie the game and send it to extras. In the 12th, the Yankees walked the game off on an RBI single to send the Yankees one victory away from a title going into Arizona. In Game 6, the Diamondbacks rode Johnson to a dominant victory 15–2 before Schilling was sent out to try to win the Series in the 7th game, once again pitching on three days' rest. Schilling allowed one run through seven innings on 90 pitches while Brenly allowed him to hit for himself in the bottom of the 7th and even pitch the 8th inning. Alfonso Soriano proceeded to hit a leadoff home run in the 8th that gave New York the lead. Brenly put in Batista to get a crucial out before putting in Johnson (who had thrown 104 pitches the night before) to get outs in the 8th and 9th inning. A 9th inning rally would end with Gonzalez lining a soft shot into the outfield to deliver a championship for Arizona.

Although the team repeated as Western Division champions in 2002, they lost in the Division Series. The 2003 team had exactly two winning months (June and September) and went 84–78 for a 3rd place finish in the West. The 2003 offseason saw them trade away Schilling. The team had a terrible start to the 2004 season and never recovered, winning just nine games each in the first two months of the year while dealing with injuries. When they were 29–50, Brenly was fired, with Colangelo stating it was not a "change of reflection" on him.

== Personal life ==
Bob Brenly married Joan Brenly on August 10, 1974; they have two children. Their son Michael was drafted by the Chicago Cubs in 2004 (out of high school) and 2008 (out of UNLV) as a catcher. He played in the Cubs and Boston Red Sox minor league systems in all or parts of eight seasons spanning 2008–2015. After retiring from the Portland Sea Dogs in May 2015, the younger Brenly took a position as the assistant bullpen catcher in the Boston organization.

== Managerial records ==
Team	Year	Regular season				Postseason			
Team	Year	Won	Lost	Win %	Finish	Won	Lost	Win %	Result
ARI	2001	92	70	.568	1st in NL West	11	6	.647	Won World Series (NYY)
ARI	2002	98	64	.605	1st in NL West	0	3	.000	Lost NLDS (STL)
ARI	2003	84	78	.519	3rd in NL West	–	–	–	–
ARI	2004	29	50	.367	5th in NL West	–	–	–	(fired)
Total		303	262	.536		11	9	.550	

Sporting positions
Preceded by Steve Stone	Chicago Cubs Television Color Commentator; 2005–2012	Succeeded by Jim Deshaies
Preceded by First	Lead color commentator, Major League Baseball on Fox (with Tim McCarver); 1996–1999	Succeeded by Tim McCarver (solo)
Preceded by First	Lead color commentator, Major League Baseball on TBS (with Tony Gwynn); 2007	Succeeded by Ron Darling and Buck Martinez
