= 2024 Major League Baseball season =

Professional baseball season in the United States and Canada

2024 MLB season
- League: Major League Baseball
- Sport: Baseball
- Duration: March 20 – October 30, 2024
- Games: 162
- Teams: 30
- TV partner(s): Fox/FS1; TBS/TruTV; ESPN/ABC; MLB Network
- Streaming partner(s): Max; Apple TV+ The Roku Channel; ESPN+

Draft
- Top draft pick: Travis Bazzana
- Picked by: Cleveland Guardians

Regular season
- Season MVP: AL: Aaron Judge (NYY); NL: Shohei Ohtani (LAD)

Postseason
- AL champions: New York Yankees
- AL runners-up: Cleveland Guardians
- NL champions: Los Angeles Dodgers
- NL runners-up: New York Mets

World Series
- Champions: Los Angeles Dodgers
- Runners-up: New York Yankees
- World Series MVP: Freddie Freeman (LAD)

MLB seasons
- ← 2023 2025 →

Locations of AL teams for the 2022–2024 MLB seasons
West Central East
Locations of NL teams for the 2017–present MLB seasons
West Central East

The 2024 Major League Baseball season (MLB) began on March 20–21 with a two-game series between the Los Angeles Dodgers and the San Diego Padres held in Seoul, South Korea, before the regular season proper run from March 28 to September 30. The 94th All-Star Game was played on July 16 at Globe Life Field in Arlington, Texas, with the American League winning, 5–3. The postseason then began on October 1 and concluded with Game 5 of the World Series on October 30. Going into the season, the defending World Series champions were the Texas Rangers from the 2023 season. During the offseason, the Oakland Athletics were approved by MLB owners to relocate to Las Vegas in 2028. It was also the team's final season in Oakland as they left the Oakland Coliseum to temporarily play at Sutter Health Park in West Sacramento for three years.

Only two teams were unable to complete the entire 162-game regular season schedule, as the game between the Houston Astros and the Cleveland Guardians at Progressive Field on September 29 was scrapped due to rain and never made up, owing to scheduling constraints and the game being inconsequential to the playoffs. It would be the first time since 2021 that a few teams played more regular season games than the others. This cancellation led to a scenario where had the Astros and Mets both won their respective pennants, the Mets would have home field advantage by a half game. Since the Astros held the superior head to head record, this means that the cancellation could have potentially decided home field advantage in the World Series (as if the game was played and the Astros won, the Astros would have held the advantage). However, neither team would make the title series, making the potential moot.

It was also the first season since 2014 that no team won at least 100 games (not counting the shortened 2020 season).

With their finish of 41–121, the Chicago White Sox achieved the record for most losses in the Modern Era (since 1901), surpassing the New York Mets of 1962.

== Schedule ==
On July 13, 2023, Major League Baseball released its 2024 schedule. There were 162 games scheduled for all teams. As has been the case since 2023, each team was scheduled to play 13 games against their division rivals, totaling 52 games. Each team would play six games against six opponents and seven games against four opponents in the same league for a total of 64 games. Each team would also play 46 interleague games, including a four-game home-and-home series against their designated interleague rival.

As part of the MLB World Tour, the Los Angeles Dodgers and the San Diego Padres opened the season at Gocheok Sky Dome in Seoul on March 20–21, in the first-ever MLB regular season games played in South Korea. Opening Day in North America occurred on March 28, with all but four clubs in action with the Milwaukee Brewers, New York Mets, Atlanta Braves, and Philadelphia Phillies opening on March 29 because of a postponement due to inclement weather. Other MLB World Tour series include the Houston Astros and the Colorado Rockies at Estadio Alfredo Harp Helú in Mexico City on April 27–28, the New York Mets and the Philadelphia Phillies at London Stadium in London on June 8–9, and the Boston Red Sox and the Tampa Bay Rays in spring training at Estadio Quisqueya in Santo Domingo on March 9–10.

The San Francisco Giants and St. Louis Cardinals played at Rickwood Field in Birmingham, Alabama on June 20, in a game honoring the Negro leagues and Hall of Fame outfielder Willie Mays, who was supposed to attend the game, but passed away two days before. The 94th All-Star Game was played on July 16, hosted by the Texas Rangers at Globe Life Field in Arlington, Texas, with the American League prevailing, 5–3. The MLB Little League Classic at Bowman Field in Williamsport, Pennsylvania was played on August 18 with the New York Yankees taking on the Detroit Tigers, in which the Tigers would walk it off in the 9th to win 3-2.

== Rule changes ==
On December 21, 2023, MLB announced a set of rule changes to take effect in 2024.

- Following a dead ball, the pitch clock will restart as soon as the pitcher receives a new ball from the umpire (previously the clock restarted once the pitcher entered the circle around the pitcher's mound).
- When runners are on base, the pitch clock's starting time will decrease from 20 seconds to 18 seconds.
- Visits to the mound will be reduced from five to four per game. Teams will receive an extra mound visit in the ninth inning if they have used four prior to that point (or in the case of a called game the final inning by the losing team).
- The runner's lane will be widened to the cut of the infield grass in fair territory. The distance between the foul line and the infield grass will be between 18 and 24 inches in all ballparks, with a grace period for non-compliant parks to make modifications. The runner's actions are deemed legal if running in fair territory provided both feet are on or touching the dirt.
- A pitcher who warms up at the start of an inning must face at least one batter; he may not be replaced during or after warmups unless injured.

== Spring training ==
Spring training for the 2024 season began in late February and lasted through most of March. Teams began workouts and practice for spring training beginning in mid-February. Pitchers and catchers reported first, followed by position players a few days later.

Prior to the start of the regular season, each team played between 27 and 34 spring training games (with the exception of the San Diego Padres and Los Angeles Dodgers, who played a shortened spring training of 21 and 22 games respectively, due to their regular season games in Seoul), beginning on February 22. There were several times during spring training when a team had two different squads playing different teams simultaneously. In addition to spring training games, teams occasionally played exhibition games with non-MLB teams, such as Minor League Baseball teams, independent teams, or college teams. These exhibition games are not counted in spring training standings. Spring training ended on March 26, two days before the Opening Day.

During spring training in 2024, MLB launched a new initiative called MLB Spring Breakout. Each organization puts together a team of their best prospects to compete against another organization's prospects from March 14 to March 17.

== Standings ==
=== American League ===
AL East
Team	W	L	Pct.	GB	Home	Road
^{(1)} New York Yankees	94	68	.580	—	44‍–‍37	50‍–‍31
^{(4)} Baltimore Orioles	91	71	.562	3	44‍–‍37	47‍–‍34
Boston Red Sox	81	81	.500	13	38‍–‍43	43‍–‍38
Tampa Bay Rays	80	82	.494	14	42‍–‍39	38‍–‍43
Toronto Blue Jays	74	88	.457	20	39‍–‍42	35‍–‍46

AL Central
Team	W	L	Pct.	GB	Home	Road
^{(2)} Cleveland Guardians	92	69	.571	—	50‍–‍30	42‍–‍39
^{(5)} Kansas City Royals	86	76	.531	6½	45‍–‍36	41‍–‍40
^{(6)} Detroit Tigers	86	76	.531	6½	43‍–‍38	43‍–‍38
Minnesota Twins	82	80	.506	10½	43‍–‍38	39‍–‍42
Chicago White Sox	41	121	.253	51½	23‍–‍58	18‍–‍63

AL West
Team	W	L	Pct.	GB	Home	Road
^{(3)} Houston Astros	88	73	.547	—	46‍–‍35	42‍–‍38
Seattle Mariners	85	77	.525	3½	49‍–‍32	36‍–‍45
Texas Rangers	78	84	.481	10½	44‍–‍37	34‍–‍47
Oakland Athletics	69	93	.426	19½	38‍–‍43	31‍–‍50
Los Angeles Angels	63	99	.389	25½	32‍–‍49	31‍–‍50

=== National League ===
NL East
Team	W	L	Pct.	GB	Home	Road
^{(2)} Philadelphia Phillies	95	67	.586	—	54‍–‍27	41‍–‍40
^{(5)} Atlanta Braves	89	73	.549	6	46‍–‍35	43‍–‍38
^{(6)} New York Mets	89	73	.549	6	46‍–‍35	43‍–‍38
Washington Nationals	71	91	.438	24	38‍–‍43	33‍–‍48
Miami Marlins	62	100	.383	33	30‍–‍51	32‍–‍49

NL Central
Team	W	L	Pct.	GB	Home	Road
^{(3)} Milwaukee Brewers	93	69	.574	—	47‍–‍34	46‍–‍35
St. Louis Cardinals	83	79	.512	10	44‍–‍37	39‍–‍42
Chicago Cubs	83	79	.512	10	44‍–‍37	39‍–‍42
Cincinnati Reds	77	85	.475	16	39‍–‍42	38‍–‍43
Pittsburgh Pirates	76	86	.469	17	39‍–‍42	37‍–‍44

NL West
Team	W	L	Pct.	GB	Home	Road
^{(1)} Los Angeles Dodgers	98	64	.605	—	52‍–‍29	46‍–‍35
^{(4)} San Diego Padres	93	69	.574	5	45‍–‍36	48‍–‍33
Arizona Diamondbacks	89	73	.549	9	44‍–‍37	45‍–‍36
San Francisco Giants	80	82	.494	18	42‍–‍39	38‍–‍43
Colorado Rockies	61	101	.377	37	37‍–‍44	24‍–‍57

== Postseason ==
The postseason began on October 1 and ended on October 30 with the Los Angeles Dodgers defeating the New York Yankees in the 2024 World Series in five games.

=== Bracket ===
Wild Card Series (ALWCS, NLWCS)
4	Baltimore	0
5	Kansas City	2
3	Houston	0
6	Detroit	2
4	San Diego	2
5	Atlanta	0
3	Milwaukee	1
6	NY Mets	2

Division Series (ALDS, NLDS)
1	NY Yankees	3
5	Kansas City	1
American League
2	Cleveland	3
6	Detroit	2
1	LA Dodgers	3
4	San Diego	2
National League
2	Philadelphia	1
6	NY Mets	3

Championship Series (ALCS, NLCS)
1	NY Yankees	4
2	Cleveland	1
1	LA Dodgers	4
6	NY Mets	2

World Series
AL1	NY Yankees	1
NL1	LA Dodgers	4

== Managerial changes ==
=== General managers ===
==== Off-season ====
Team	Former GM	Reason For Leaving	New GM	Notes
Chicago White Sox	Rick Hahn	Fired	Chris Getz	On August 22, 2023, Hahn and Executive Vice President Kenny Williams, who both held their previous titles since 2012, were fired. On August 31, Chris Getz was named the new general manager and senior vice president of the team.
Boston Red Sox	Brian O'Halloran	Reassigned	Craig Breslow	On September 14, 2023, O'Halloran accepted the position of senior vice president of baseball operations with the team. On October 25, Breslow was hired to the position of Chief Baseball Officer, which encompasses the duties of general manager.
New York Mets	Billy Eppler	Resigned	David Stearns	On October 5, 2023, Eppler resigned as general manager as a result of MLB opening an investigation into his potentially improper use of the injured list. On October 1, Stearns was hired to the position of President of Baseball Operations, which encompasses the duties of general manager.
Miami Marlins	Kim Ng	Resigned	Peter Bendix	On October 16, 2023, Ng resigned as general manager after three years. The Marlins made one postseason appearance during her tenure. On November 5, Bendix was hired by the Miami Marlins to be their President of Baseball Operations.
Tampa Bay Rays	Peter Bendix	Hired by the Miami Marlins	N/A	On November 5, 2023, Bendix was hired by the Miami Marlins to be their President of Baseball Operations, which encompasses the duties of general manager.

=== Field managers ===
==== Offseason ====
Team	Former Manager	Interim Manager	Reason For Leaving	New Manager	Notes
San Francisco Giants	Gabe Kapler	Kai Correa	Fired	Bob Melvin	On September 29, 2023, the Giants fired Kapler. After four seasons with the team, he compiled a record of 295–248 (.543) and made the playoffs once in 2021. Bench coach Kai Correa was named interim manager for the final three games of the 2023 season. Melvin was hired on October 25. This will be his fifth managerial position, previously managing in Seattle, Arizona, Oakland, and San Diego, compiling a lifetime managerial record of 1,517–1,425 (.516).
New York Mets	Buck Showalter	N/A	Fired	Carlos Mendoza	On October 1, 2023, Showalter announced he would not return to manage the Mets for the 2024 season. According to team owner Steve Cohen and general manager Billy Eppler, the Mets informed Showalter that they did not plan to bring him back for next season, even though he had one year left on his contract. He compiled a record of 176–148 (.543) in two seasons with the team with one playoff appearance. On November 13, Yankees bench coach Carlos Mendoza was named the new manager of the team.
Los Angeles Angels	Phil Nevin	N/A	Option not picked up	Ron Washington	On October 2, 2023, the Angels announced they would not be picking up Nevin's option for 2024. After taking over as manager in June 2022, he compiled a record of 119–149 (.444) with no playoff appearances. Washington was hired on November 8. This will be his second managerial position, previously managing Texas from 2007 to 2014, going 664–611 (.521) and winning the AL pennant in back-to-back seasons in 2010 and 2011.
Cleveland Guardians	Terry Francona	N/A	Retired	Stephen Vogt	On October 3, 2023, Francona announced he was stepping away as manager of the Guardians. In 11 seasons with Cleveland, he compiled a record of 921–757 (.549) with six playoff appearances, three AL Central division titles, and a World Series appearance. Vogt was hired on November 6. This will be his first managerial position.
San Diego Padres	Bob Melvin	N/A	Hired by the San Francisco Giants	Mike Shildt	Melvin was granted permission from the Padres to become the manager of the San Francisco Giants on October 24, 2023. In his tenure with the Padres, he compiled a record of 171–153 (.528), with one playoff appearance, advancing to the NLCS in 2022. On November 21, Mike Shildt was named the new manager of the Padres. This will be his second managerial position.
Houston Astros	Dusty Baker	N/A	Retired	Joe Espada	On October 25, 2023, Baker announced his retirement after four seasons with the Astros and 26 years overall as a manager. He finished his tenure with the Astros with a 320–226 (.586) record, winning the 2022 World Series. On November 13, Joe Espada was named the new manager of the team. This is his first managerial position.
Chicago Cubs	David Ross	N/A	Fired	Craig Counsell	On November 6, 2023, the Cubs fired Ross after four seasons. He finished his tenure with a 262–284 (.480) record, with one playoff appearance, winning the NL Central in the 2020 season. Counsell was hired on the same day. As the Brewers manager, he compiled a record of 707–625 (.531), with three NL Central division titles and five overall playoff appearances.
Milwaukee Brewers	Craig Counsell	N/A	Contract expired	Pat Murphy	Counsell's contract with the Brewers expired on November 1, 2023. The Brewers offered a contract extension to Counsell weeks prior before the 53-year-old became a free agent and interviewed with other clubs. Counsell became the manager of the Chicago Cubs on November 6. As the Brewers manager for nine seasons, he compiled a record of 707–625 (.531), with three NL Central division titles and five overall playoff appearances. On November 15, Pat Murphy was named the new manager of the team. This will be his second managerial position.

==== In-season ====
Team	Former manager	Interim manager	Reason for leaving	New manager	Notes
Chicago White Sox	Pedro Grifol	Grady Sizemore	Fired	Will Venable	On August 8, the White Sox fired Grifol. In two seasons as manager of the White Sox, he compiled a record of 89–190 (.319) with no playoff appearances. Sizemore, the current Major League Coach, was named as the interim manager on the same day Grifol and bench coach Charlie Montoyo were fired. This was his first managerial position. Venable was hired on October 31. He had previously been an assistant coach for the Chicago Cubs, Boston Red Sox, and Texas Rangers.
Seattle Mariners	Scott Servais	N/A	Fired	Dan Wilson	On August 22, the Mariners fired Servais. In nine seasons as manager of the Mariners, he compiled a record of 668–624 (.517) with one playoff appearance, the Mariners' first playoff appearance since 2001. Wilson, the current Minor League Catching Coordinator, was named as the manager on the same day Servais was fired. This is his first managerial position.
Cincinnati Reds	David Bell	Freddie Benavides	Fired	Terry Francona	On September 22, the Reds fired David Bell. During his six seasons as the Reds skipper, Bell compiled a record of 409–456 (.473) with one playoff appearance during the 2020 COVID-shortened season. Benavides, the current bench coach, was named as the interim manager for the rest of the season. This is his first managerial position. On October 4, the Reds announced Terry Francona as the new manager of the team. This will be his fourth managerial position, previously managing in Philadelphia, Boston, and Cleveland, compiling a lifetime managerial record of 1,950–1,672 (.538) and two World Series Championships with the Red Sox.

== League leaders ==
=== American League ===
Hitting leaders
Stat	Player	Total
AVG	Bobby Witt Jr. (KC)	.332
OPS	Aaron Judge (NYY)	1.159
HR	Aaron Judge (NYY)	58
RBI	Aaron Judge (NYY)	144
R	Juan Soto (NYY)	128
H	Bobby Witt Jr. (KC)	211
SB	José Caballero (TB)	44

Pitching leaders
Stat	Player	Total
W	Tarik Skubal (DET)	18
L	Kutter Crawford (BOS)	16
ERA	Tarik Skubal (DET)	2.39
K	Tarik Skubal (DET)	228
IP	Logan Gilbert (SEA)	208.2
SV	Emmanuel Clase (CLE)	47
WHIP	Logan Gilbert (SEA)	0.887

=== National League ===
Hitting leaders
Stat	Player	Total
AVG	Luis Arráez (SD)/(MIA)	.314
OPS	Shohei Ohtani (LAD)	1.036
HR	Shohei Ohtani (LAD)	54
RBI	Shohei Ohtani (LAD)	130
R	Shohei Ohtani (LAD)	134
H	Luis Arráez (SD)/(MIA)	200
SB	Elly De La Cruz (CIN)	67

Pitching leaders
Stat	Player	Total
W	Chris Sale (ATL)	18
L	Jake Irvin (WAS)	14
ERA	Chris Sale (ATL)	2.38
K	Chris Sale (ATL)	225
IP	Logan Webb (SF)	204.2
SV	Ryan Helsley (STL)	49
WHIP	Zack Wheeler (PHI)	0.955

== Milestones ==
=== Batters ===
- Tyler O'Neill (BOS):
  - Hit a home run on Opening Day for the fifth consecutive season, setting a new Major League record. He broke the record that he held with Yogi Berra, Gary Carter, and Todd Hundley.
- Elly De La Cruz (CIN):
  - Became the first player with a 450-foot-plus homer and an inside-the-park HR in the same game under the Statcast era (2015) on April 8 against the Milwaukee Brewers.
  - With his 30th stolen base on May 16, De La Cruz became the sixth player in Major League history to reach 30 stolen bases in his team's first 44 games.
  - With his 60th stolen base on August 21, De La Cruz became the fifth player in Major League history since 1900 to hit at least 20 home runs and steal 60 bases in a season.
  - With his 65th stolen base on September 20, De La Cruz became the third player in Major League history since 1900 with 100 stolen bases in his first two Major League seasons.
- Shohei Ohtani (LAD):
  - Hit his 176th career home run against the New York Mets on April 21, setting a new Major League record for most home runs by a Japanese-born player. He broke the record that was held by Hideki Matsui.
  - Hit his 200th career home run against the Detroit Tigers on July 13, becoming the first Japanese-born player to hit 200 home runs in Major League history.
  - With his 30th stolen base on August 3 against the Oakland Athletics, Ohtani joined the 30–30 club in his 108th game. He became the third-fastest player in Major League history to record a 30–30 season (going by number of games played by the player when reaching the milestone.) Eric Davis holds the record he set in 1987 for the Cincinnati Reds in 90 games. Alex Rodriguez accomplished this feat in 107 games in 1998 while a member of the Seattle Mariners.
  - With his 40th stolen base and 40th home run on August 23 against the Tampa Bay Rays, Ohtani became the sixth member of the 40–40 club. Accomplishing this in 126 games, he became the fastest player in Major League history to reach the milestone, breaking the record of 147 games set by Alfonso Soriano of the Washington Nationals in 2006.
  - With his 50th stolen base and 50th home run on September 19 against the Miami Marlins, Ohtani became the first player in MLB history to reach 50 home runs and 50 stolen bases in a season. He accomplished the achievement in 150 games.
  - Hit a home run and stole a base in the same game on September 20 against the Colorado Rockies, making it his 14th such game this season, breaking the record set by Rickey Henderson in 1986.
  - With his 57th stolen base on September 27 against the Colorado Rockies, Ohtani set a new single-season record for most stolen bases in a single season by a Japanese-born player. He broke the record that was held by Ichiro Suzuki.
- Pete Alonso (NYM):
  - Hit his 200th career home run against the St. Louis Cardinals on April 27 in his 710th career game, the fourth fastest player in Major League history to reach that milestone.
- Gunnar Henderson (BAL):
  - Became the youngest player in Major League history to hit 10 home runs before May 1 of a season (22 years, 305 days old) on April 29 against the New York Yankees.
- Juan Soto (NYY):
  - Drew his 669th career walk on May 14 against the Minnesota Twins, setting a new Major League record for most walks drawn by a batter before they celebrated their 26th birthday (25 years, 202 days old). He broke the record that was held by Mickey Mantle.
- José Miranda (MIN):
  - Recorded a hit in 12 consecutive at-bats with a single against the Houston Astros on July 6, tying the Major League record held by Walt Dropo (1952), Pinky Higgins (1938), and Johnny Kling (1902).
- Rece Hinds (CIN):
  - Became the first player in Major League history to record five extra-base hits in his first two games in his career against the Colorado Rockies on July 8–9.
- Paul Goldschmidt (STL):
  - Recorded his 2,000th career hit on July 27 against the Washington Nationals. He became the 295th player to reach this mark.
- Freddie Freeman (LAD):
  - Recorded his 500th career double in the first inning on August 6 against the Philadelphia Phillies. He became the 65th player to reach this mark and the 10th-youngest at 34 years, 329 days old.
- Aaron Judge (NYY):
  - Hit his 300th home run on August 14 against the Chicago White Sox, becoming the fastest player to do so in his 955th game, breaking the record held by Ralph Kiner (1,087 games) and his 3,431st at-bat, breaking the record held by Babe Ruth (3,831 at-bats).
  - Became the fifth player in Major League history to hit 50+ home runs in three different seasons when he hit his 50th on August 25 against the Colorado Rockies. He joins Babe Ruth, Mark McGwire, Sammy Sosa, and Alex Rodriguez.
- Francisco Lindor (NYM):
  - With his 25th home run of the season on August 21 against the Baltimore Orioles, Lindor became the first shortstop in Major League history to have three seasons with at least 25 home runs and 25 stolen bases. He accomplished this feat last year with the Mets and in 2018 with the Cleveland Indians.
- Danny Jansen (BOS)/(TOR):
  - Became the first player in Major League history to play for both teams (Toronto Blue Jays and Boston Red Sox) in the same game. The game started on June 26 when Jansen was a member of the Blue Jays but was suspended due to rain with Jansen at-bat. Jansen was traded to the Red Sox on July 27. The game was completed on August 26, where Jansen went 1–4 for Boston.
- Corey Seager (TEX):
  - Recorded his 200th career home run on August 29 against the Chicago White Sox. He is the first purely left-handed-hitting shortstop in Major League history to reach this milestone and the 15th shortstop overall.
- Kyle Schwarber (PHI):
  - Hit his 14th leadoff home run of the season on September 10 against the Tampa Bay Rays, setting the Major League record for most leadoff home runs in a single season. He broke the record that was held by Alfonso Soriano during the 2003 season.
- Luis Arráez (SD)/(MIA):
  - By winning the National League batting title with a .314 average, Arráez became the first player in Major League Baseball to win three consecutive batting titles with three different teams.

=== Pitchers ===
==== No-hitters ====
- Ronel Blanco (HOU):
  - Threw the first no-hitter of the season, his career, and the 17th in team history in a 10–0 victory against the Toronto Blue Jays on April 1. Blanco threw 105 pitches with 73 for strikes. He walked two and struck out seven batters.
- Dylan Cease (SD):
  - Threw his first career no-hitter and the second no-hitter in Padres franchise history in a 3–0 victory against the Washington Nationals on July 25. Cease threw 114 pitches with 71 for strikes. He walked three and struck out nine batters.
- Blake Snell (SF):
  - Threw his first career no-hitter and the 18th in team history in a 3–0 victory against the Cincinnati Reds on August 2. Snell threw 114 pitches with 78 for strikes. He walked three and struck out eleven batters.
- Shōta Imanaga / Nate Pearson / Porter Hodge (CHC):
  - The three pitchers combined to throw a no-hitter against the Pittsburgh Pirates, defeating them 12–0 on September 4. It is the Cubs' 18th no-hitter in franchise history. Imanaga went the first seven innings, walking two and striking out seven over 95 pitches (66 for strikes). Pearson (10 pitches, seven strikes) and Hodge (nine pitches, eight strikes) pitched the eighth and ninth innings, respectively.

==== Other pitching accomplishments ====
- Ronel Blanco (HOU):
  - Blanco faced 44 batters in a row before allowing a hit, a single by Adolis García in the sixth inning on April 7 against the Texas Rangers. It is the most by a pitcher to begin a season in at least the expansion era (since 1961).
- Shota Imanaga (CHC):
  - After his start against the Pittsburgh Pirates on May 18, Imanaga had a 0.84 earned run average (ERA), setting a Major League record for the lowest ERA through his first nine career starts since ERA became an official statistic in 1913. The old record was set in 1981 by Fernando Valenzuela with an 0.91 ERA.
- Jeremiah Estrada (SD):
  - Set the Major League record for most consecutive strikeouts (since 1961), when he struck out his 12th straight batter on May 28 against the Miami Marlins. He broke the record that was set by José Alvarado. He then struck out his 13th straight batter to complete the inning.
- Aroldis Chapman (PIT):
  - Recorded his 1,197th career strikeout on June 29, against the Atlanta Braves, setting a Major League record for most strikeouts by a left-handed reliever. He broke the record that was set by Billy Wagner.
- Paul Skenes (PIT):
  - Became the second pitcher in Major League history to strike out at least 70 batters and issue 12 or fewer walks in the first 10 career starts. Masahiro Tanaka, in 2014, had 79 strikeouts and 10 walks, and Skenes struck out 78 with 12 walks.
  - Recorded seven or more strikeouts in nine of his 10 career outings, setting the Major League record for most within a player's first 10 career games.
- Lance Lynn (STL):
  - Became the 88th pitcher in Major League history to reach the 2,000-strikeout mark when he struck out Jared Triolo in the bottom of the fourth inning against the Pittsburgh Pirates on July 23.
- Charlie Morton (ATL):
  - Became the 89th pitcher in Major League history to reach the 2,000-strikeout mark when he struck out Mike Yastrzemski in the bottom of the sixth inning against the San Francisco Giants on August 13.
- Gerrit Cole (NYY):
  - Recorded his 150th career win in defeating the Cleveland Guardians on August 22. He became the 266th pitcher to reach this mark.
- Yu Darvish (SD):
  - Became the 90th pitcher in Major League history to reach the 2,000-strikeout mark when he struck out Luis Robert Jr. in the top of the third inning against the Chicago White Sox on September 22. He also became the first Japanese-born pitcher to reach 2,000 strikeouts in Major League history.

=== Miscellaneous ===
- Arizona Diamondbacks:
  - Set a Major League record for most runs scored in an inning on Opening Day, by scoring 14 runs in the third inning against the Colorado Rockies. In doing so, they also set a modern (1900–present) Major League record for most runs scored in the third inning.
- Colorado Rockies:
  - Set a Major League record for a team with the most consecutive games to start a season trailing, with 30 games in a row on May 1 against the Miami Marlins.
  - Became the first team in Major League history to record a walk-off win with a pitch clock violation on June 22 against the Washington Nationals.
- Chicago White Sox:
  - Lost their 21st consecutive game on August 5 to the Oakland Athletics, tying the American League record for most consecutive losses that was set by the Baltimore Orioles in 1988.
  - Lost their 20th consecutive game started by Chris Flexen on September 2 to the Baltimore Orioles, breaking a Major League record held by Bob Groom of the Washington Nationals.
  - Set a Major League record for most losses before the All-Star break, with 71. The previous record of 69 was set by the Oakland Athletics in 1979 and the Baltimore Orioles in 2018.
  - Set a Major League record for fastest playoff elimination in the divisional/wild card era, being eliminated from the playoffs on August 17. The previous record was August 20, set by the Baltimore Orioles in 2018.
  - Set the modern Major League record for most games under .500 at any point in the season, falling 82 games under .500 on September 20. The previous modern era record of 81 games was set by the Philadelphia Athletics in 1916. The White Sox fell to a low of 84 games under .500 on September 23.
  - Set the American League record for most losses in a season on September 22 with 120. The previous record of 119 was set by the Detroit Tigers in 2003.
  - Set the modern Major League record for most losses in a season on September 27 with 121. The previous record of 120 was set by the New York Mets in 1962.
- Miami Marlins:
  - Set the Major League record for most players used in a season with 70 following the debut of pitcher Michael Petersen on September 13. The previous record holder was the 2021 Chicago Cubs with 69.

== Awards and honors ==
=== Regular season ===
Baseball Writers' Association of America Awards
BBWAA Award	National League	American League
Rookie of the Year	Paul Skenes (PIT)	Luis Gil (NYY)
Manager of the Year	Pat Murphy (MIL)	Stephen Vogt (CLE)
Cy Young Award	Chris Sale (ATL)	Tarik Skubal (DET)
Most Valuable Player	Shohei Ohtani (LAD)	Aaron Judge (NYY)
Gold Glove Awards
Position	National League	American League
Pitcher	Chris Sale (ATL)	Seth Lugo (KC)
Catcher	Patrick Bailey (SF)	Cal Raleigh (SEA)
1st Base	Christian Walker (ARI)	Carlos Santana (MIN)
2nd Base	Brice Turang (MIL)	Andrés Giménez (CLE)
3rd Base	Matt Chapman (SF)	Alex Bregman (HOU)
Shortstop	Ezequiel Tovar (COL)	Bobby Witt Jr. (KC)
Left field	Ian Happ (CHC)	Steven Kwan (CLE)
Center field	Brenton Doyle (COL)	Daulton Varsho (TOR)
Right field	Sal Frelick (MIL)	Wilyer Abreu (BOS)
Utility	Jared Triolo (PIT)	Dylan Moore (SEA)
Team	Milwaukee Brewers	Toronto Blue Jays
Platinum Glove	Brice Turang (MIL)	Cal Raleigh (SEA)
Silver Slugger Awards
Designated Hitter	Shohei Ohtani (LAD)	Brent Rooker (OAK)
Catcher	William Contreras (MIL)	Salvador Perez (KC)
1st Base	Bryce Harper (PHI)	Vladimir Guerrero Jr. (TOR)
2nd Base	Ketel Marte (ARI)	Jose Altuve (HOU)
3rd Base	Manny Machado (SD)	José Ramírez (CLE)
Shortstop	Francisco Lindor (NYM)	Bobby Witt Jr. (KC)
Outfield	Teoscar Hernández (LAD); Jackson Merrill (SD); Jurickson Profar (SD)	Aaron Judge (NYY); Anthony Santander (BAL); Juan Soto (NYY)
Utility	Mookie Betts (LAD)	Josh Smith (TEX)
Team	Los Angeles Dodgers	New York Yankees

=== All-MLB Team ===
Players are selected through fan votes (50%) and votes from a panel of experts (50%). The winners will be selected based on merit, with no set number of nominees per position and no distinction between leagues.

All-MLB Team
Position	First Team	Second Team
Starting pitcher	Corbin Burnes (BAL)	Dylan Cease (SD)
Starting pitcher	Chris Sale (ATL)	Shota Imanaga (CHC)
Starting pitcher	Paul Skenes (PIT)	Michael King (SD)
Starting pitcher	Tarik Skubal (DET)	Seth Lugo (KC)
Starting pitcher	Zack Wheeler (PHI)	Framber Valdez (HOU)
Relief pitcher	Emmanuel Clase (CLE)	Mason Miller (OAK)
Relief pitcher	Ryan Helsley (STL)	Kirby Yates (TEX)
Designated hitter	Shohei Ohtani (LAD)	Yordan Alvarez (HOU)
Catcher	William Contreras (MIL)	Salvador Pérez (KC)
1st Base	Vladimir Guerrero Jr. (TOR)	Bryce Harper (PHI)
2nd Base	Ketel Marte (ARI)	Jose Altuve (HOU)
3rd Base	José Ramírez (CLE)	Manny Machado (SD)
Shortstop	Bobby Witt Jr. (KC)	Francisco Lindor (NYM)
Outfield	Mookie Betts (LAD)	Jarren Duran (BOS)
Outfield	Aaron Judge (NYY)	Teoscar Hernández (LAD)
Outfield	Juan Soto (NYY)	Jackson Merrill (SD)

=== Other awards ===
- The Sporting News Player of the Year Award: Shohei Ohtani (LAD)
- Comeback Players of the Year: Chris Sale (ATL, National); Garrett Crochet (CWS, American)
- Edgar Martínez Award (Best designated hitter): Shohei Ohtani (LAD)
- Hank Aaron Award (Best hitter): Shohei Ohtani (LAD, National); Aaron Judge (NYY, American)
- Roberto Clemente Award (Humanitarian): Salvador Perez (KC)
- Mariano Rivera AL Reliever of the Year Award (Best AL reliever): Emmanuel Clase (CLE)
- Trevor Hoffman NL Reliever of the Year Award (Best NL reliever): Ryan Helsley (STL)
- Heart & Hustle Award: Bobby Witt Jr. (KC)
- Warren Spahn Award (Best left-handed pitcher): Chris Sale (ATL)

Fielding Bible Awards
Position	Player
Pitcher	Tanner Bibee (CLE)
Catcher	Patrick Bailey (SF)
1st Base	Matt Olson (ATL)
2nd Base	Andrés Giménez (CLE)
3rd Base	Matt Chapman (SF)
Shortstop	Masyn Winn (STL)
Left Field	Riley Greene (DET)
Center Field	Brenton Doyle (COL)
Right Field	Wilyer Abreu (BOS)
Multi-position	Daulton Varsho (TOR)

=== Monthly awards ===
==== Player of the Month ====
Month	American League	National League
April	Gunnar Henderson	Mookie Betts
May	Aaron Judge	Bryce Harper
June	Aaron Judge	Bryce Harper
July	Bobby Witt Jr.	Brenton Doyle
August	Aaron Judge	Corbin Carroll
September	Wyatt Langford	Shohei Ohtani

==== Rookie of the Month ====
Month	American League	National League
April	Colton Cowser	Shōta Imanaga
May	Luis Gil	Joey Ortiz
June	Wyatt Langford	Jackson Merrill
July	Colt Keith	Tyler Fitzgerald
August	Spencer Arrighetti	Jackson Merrill
September	Wyatt Langford	Paul Skenes

==== Pitcher of the Month ====
Month	American League	National League
April	José Berríos	Ranger Suárez
May	Luis Gil	Chris Sale
June	Garrett Crochet	Cristopher Sánchez
July	Taj Bradley	Dylan Cease
August	Bowden Francis	Blake Snell
September	Corbin Burnes	Nick Martinez

==== Reliever of the Month ====
Month	American League	National League
April	Mason Miller	Ryan Helsley
May	Emmanuel Clase	Robert Suárez
June	Carlos Estévez	Ryan Helsley
July	Emmanuel Clase	Tanner Scott
August	Josh Hader	Raisel Iglesias
September	Emmanuel Clase	Ryan Helsley

== Home field attendance and payroll ==
Team name	Wins	%±	Home attendance	%±	Per game	Est. payroll	%±
Los Angeles Dodgers	98	−2.0%	3,941,251	2.7%	48,657	$262,386,278	15.5%
Philadelphia Phillies	95	5.6%	3,363,712	10.2%	41,527	$248,632,283	3.0%
San Diego Padres	93	13.4%	3,330,545	1.8%	41,118	$159,391,555	−32.5%
New York Yankees	94	14.6%	3,309,838	1.2%	40,862	$291,463,084	12.4%
Atlanta Braves	89	−14.4%	3,011,755	−5.6%	37,182	$241,662,300	24.4%
Chicago Cubs	83	0.0%	2,909,755	4.9%	35,923	$223,048,500	36.9%
St. Louis Cardinals	83	16.9%	2,878,115	−11.2%	35,532	$189,534,400	8.9%
Houston Astros	88	−2.2%	2,835,234	−7.1%	35,003	$275,678,766	14.7%
Toronto Blue Jays	74	−16.9%	2,681,236	−11.3%	33,102	$225,628,287	6.8%
Boston Red Sox	81	3.8%	2,659,949	−0.5%	32,839	$160,834,775	−11.3%
Texas Rangers	78	−13.3%	2,651,553	4.7%	32,735	$261,471,834	5.2%
San Francisco Giants	80	1.3%	2,647,736	5.9%	32,688	$232,370,883	30.6%
Los Angeles Angels	63	−13.7%	2,577,597	−2.4%	31,822	$165,637,050	−24.2%
Seattle Mariners	85	−3.4%	2,555,813	−5.0%	31,553	$142,547,548	11.2%
Colorado Rockies	61	3.4%	2,540,195	−2.6%	31,360	$147,069,963	−5.5%
Milwaukee Brewers	93	1.1%	2,537,202	−0.6%	31,323	$115,142,460	−16.7%
Arizona Diamondbacks	89	6.0%	2,341,876	19.4%	28,912	$161,660,152	40.3%
New York Mets	89	18.7%	2,329,299	−9.5%	28,757	$262,702,250	26.0%
Baltimore Orioles	91	−9.9%	2,281,129	17.8%	28,162	$131,181,049	58.5%
Cleveland Guardians	92	21.1%	2,056,264	12.1%	25,703	$94,230,728	34.4%
Cincinnati Reds	77	−6.1%	2,024,178	−0.7%	24,990	$98,323,334	26.3%
Washington Nationals	71	0.0%	1,967,302	5.4%	24,288	$132,086,867	33.1%
Minnesota Twins	82	−5.7%	1,951,616	−1.1%	24,094	$135,762,591	−1.5%
Detroit Tigers	86	10.3%	1,858,295	15.2%	22,942	$105,584,833	−11.4%
Pittsburgh Pirates	76	0.0%	1,720,361	5.5%	21,239	$97,476,500	34.6%
Kansas City Royals	86	53.6%	1,658,347	26.9%	20,473	$113,442,261	28.6%
Chicago White Sox	41	−32.8%	1,380,733	−17.3%	17,046	$123,336,791	−12.4%
Tampa Bay Rays	80	−19.2%	1,337,739	−7.1%	16,515	$128,533,112	70.4%
Miami Marlins	62	−26.2%	1,087,455	−6.5%	13,425	$109,992,600	−3.8%
Oakland Athletics	69	38.0%	922,286	10.8%	11,386	$55,690,000	8.7%

== Uniforms ==
=== Wholesale changes ===
- Nike's new Vapor Premier template started being used across all Major League uniforms in 2024, replacing the previous Majestic Athletic FlexBase template that Nike inherited upon taking over MLB's uniform contract in 2020. The new template was first used in the uniforms worn during the 2023 All-Star Game. The Nike Vapor Premier uniforms, manufactured by Fanatics, have received criticism from players and fans for its subpar quality compared to previous uniforms. During spring training, the Royals opted out of using the Vapor Premier template, instead wearing uniforms that feature the larger player name and number font used by the older uniforms. In late April 2024, the MLB Players Association sent a memo to players stating that the uniforms would be overhauled, at the latest by the start of the 2025 season, hoping to rectify many of the complaints aimed at Nike's Vapor Premier template. The MLBPA "placed the blame on Nike" and the Vapor Premier uniform, claiming "Nike was innovating something that didn't need to be innovated", while "absolv[ing] Fanatics".
- The Diamondbacks unveiled a new uniform set, adding teal as a full-time accent color. Cream returned as the base color on the home uniforms for the first time since 2006, as is the alternate "D-snake" logo. Sand was removed entirely from the uniforms, except for the "City Connect" uniform.
- Due to Nike's 4+1 Rule, the Phillies dropped their red alternate uniform in favor of a City Connect uniform to be unveiled during the 2024 season. It had been used in the regular season for home games in 2016 and 2017, and again from 2021 to 2023 for road games.
- The Mets removed the white outline on the text and logo on their black alternate jerseys and caps.
- The Yankees made slight changes to their road uniform by removing the white outline on the lettering and numbering as well as the stripe pattern on their sleeves. It was the first time since 1972 that the team had changed their road uniforms.
- The Nationals added a pullover alternate uniform and changed their road uniforms. It was the first time since the Cincinnati Reds uniforms from 1972–1992 to have a pullover jersey on a regular basis. The team also retired their red alternate uniform with a white curly "W". The team also removed the front numbers to their home and alternate navy jerseys.
- The Marlins modified their black alternate uniforms by featuring white accents to the team's name on the front and the player's name and number on the back. The team also introduced and modified their teal alternate uniforms by featuring the team's name as well.
- The Braves added a red lining to their alternate navy jerseys.

=== Uniform advertisements ===
This is the second year where teams added advertisement patches to their uniforms. The following teams have announced their uniform advertisements.

- Baltimore Orioles: T. Rowe Price
- Chicago Cubs: Motorola
- Kansas City Royals: QuikTrip
- Los Angeles Dodgers: Guggenheim Baseball Management
- Philadelphia Phillies: Independence Blue Cross
- Pittsburgh Pirates: Sheetz
- San Francisco Giants: Chevrolet (2024 season only)
- Texas Rangers: Energy Transfer Partners

=== City Connect ===
Eight teams unveiled new City Connect uniforms and wore them for the first time during the season. Additionally, the Los Angeles Dodgers unveiled their City Connect this year, becoming the first team to change their City Connect uniform since the program's inception.

- The Phillies' City Connect uniform features blue and yellow colors across the uniform, inspired by the Flag of Philadelphia. The jersey features Philadelphia's common abbreviation "PHILLY" across the chest in white lettering. The cap features the Liberty Bell, with the skyline of Philadelphia inside and two stars on each side.
- The Mets' City Connect uniform features several elements that are related to New York City. The jersey features purple pinstripes and New York's abbreviation "NYC" across the chest. The cap features the Mets' "NY" interlocked logo along with the Queensboro Bridge, which connects the boroughs of Manhattan and Queens. The purple color was inspired by the 7 subway line that runs to Citi Field.
- The Rays' City Connect uniform features the city name outlined in neon across the chest, similar to the Devil Rays road jersey from 1998 to 2000. The cap features the Sunshine Skyway Bridge, which crosses into St. Petersburg along with the sting-ray, also called "skyray". Another logo features three palm trees and a pelican, both of which have several ties to the area, symbolizing the "Bro Bowl" skate park and the St. Petersburg Pelicans of the Florida State Negro League in the 1940s and 50's.
- The Tigers' City Connect uniform features elements that pay tribute to the automotive industry in Detroit. The jersey features blue and black gradient coloring and Detroit's nickname "Motor City" across the chest in white lettering. The cap is also black and features the city name across and in white lettering.
- The Guardians' City Connect uniform features elements that pay tribute to the Guardians of Traffic. The jersey features Cleveland's abbreviation "CLE" in white art-deco lettering inside of a dark blue base. It also features a red and white stripe pattern around the uniform which pays tribute to Cleveland's past uniforms in the 1990s. The cap features a dark blue diamond shape "C" along with white and dark blue colors.
- The Cardinals' City Connect uniform features the nickname of St. Louis, "The Lou" across the chest of the jersey and featuring the "birds on the bat" logo. The cap is red and features the abbreviation in St. Louis "STL" across and in white lettering. The font for the abbreviation is from their 1920 uniforms.
- The Blue Jays' City Connect uniforms feature several elements that are inspired by Toronto's nightlife. The jersey features the city name and the skyline of Toronto in red and blue colors. The cap features a "split T" logo in red and blue and a maple leaf, which is inspired from the Flag of Toronto.
- The Twins' City Connect uniforms feature several elements that are inspired by the 10,000 Lakes that are located in Minnesota. The Jersey has a look of a rippling effect, with the abbreviation MN on the right of the Jersey, with the North Star between the two letters on top. The Jersey is mainly a light blue/blue mix with yellow outlines on the sleeves and a yellow belt. The hat has the outline of the state of Minnesota with a lake on the bottom of the state and the northern lights on the top, and a North Star where the Twins are located, which is in the Twin Cities area (Minneapolis). On the side of the hat is a wordmark that reads 10,000 Lakes. On the bottom of the hat bill is the outline of Lake Minnetonka.
- The Dodgers' second City Connect uniform features elements inspired by the nicknames of Los Angeles, "City of Dreams" and the "City of Stars". The jersey features the city name in dusk and electric blue lettering. The sleeve features the "LA" interlocked along with the Dodgers scripted "D" combined in dusk blue. The cap is dusk blue and features combined "LA" interlocked and the Dodgers scripted "D" in cream lettering.

Prior to the season, it was announced that 2024 would be the final season the Nationals would wear their "cherry blossom" City Connect uniforms. Late in the season, the Giants, Rockies, Marlins, and Astros each announced that they would be retiring their respective City Connect uniforms in favor of new designs for the 2025 season.

=== Anniversaries and special events ===
Team	Special occasion
All Teams	Jackie Robinson Day (April 15)
All Teams	Pink Ribbons for breast cancer awareness (May 12, Mother's Day)
All Teams	Patch for Armed Forces Day (May 20) and Camouflage caps for Armed Force's Day Weekend (May 19–21)
All Teams	Poppy for Memorial Day (May 27)
All Teams	#4 patch for Lou Gehrig Day (June 2)
All Teams	"Play Ball" patch in partnership with USA Baseball and USA Softball (June 14–16)
All Teams	Blue Ribbons for prostate cancer (June 16, Father's Day)
All Teams	National Baseball Hall of Fame and Museum logo patches (July 19–21)
All Teams	Gold Ribbons for childhood cancer (September 1)
All Teams	#21 patch for Roberto Clemente Day (September 15)
All Teams	"MLB Debut" patch for players who play their first Major League game
Arizona Diamondbacks	Inaugural season of the Arizona Diamondback team Hall of Fame. Luis Gonzalez and Randy Johnson will be the 1st inductees.
Atlanta Braves	50th Anniversary of Hank Aaron's 715th Home Run
Baltimore Orioles	70th Anniversary Season
Boston Red Sox	20th Anniversary of 2004 World Series Championship
Boston Red Sox	#49 Patch in memory of Tim Wakefield
Chicago Cubs	"OTIS" patch in memory of clubhouse manager Tom "Otis" Hellmann (April 6)
Cleveland Guardians	30th Anniversary of Progressive Field
Detroit Tigers	40th Anniversary of 1984 World Series Championship
Los Angeles Dodgers	#34 Patch in memory of Fernando Valenzuela (October 25 onwards)
New York Mets	55th Anniversary of 1969 World Series Championship
New York Mets	#3 Patch in memory of Bud Harrelson
New York Mets	#24 Patch in memory of Willie Mays (June 28 onwards)
New York Mets	#15 Patch in memory of Jerry Grote (June 28 onwards)
New York Yankees	15th Anniversary of 2009 World Series Championship
New York Yankees	25th Anniversary of 1999 World Series Championship
Oakland Athletics	35th Anniversary of 1989 World Series Championship
Oakland Athletics	50th Anniversary of 1974 World Series Championship
Philadelphia Phillies	20th Anniversary of Citizens Bank Park
Pittsburgh Pirates	45th Anniversary of 1979 World Series Championship
San Diego Padres	20th Anniversary of Petco Park
San Diego Padres	"PS" patch in memory of owner Peter Seidler
San Francisco Giants	10th Anniversary of 2014 World Series Championship
San Francisco Giants	#24 Patch in memory of Willie Mays (June 19 onwards)
San Francisco Giants	#30 Patch in memory of Orlando Cepeda (June 29 onwards)
Seattle Mariners	25th Anniversary of T-Mobile Park
St. Louis Cardinals	60th Anniversary of 1964 World Series Championship
St. Louis Cardinals	#24 patch in memory of Whitey Herzog (May 17 onwards)
Texas Rangers	2024 MLB All-Star Game
Texas Rangers	2023 World Series championship (March 28)
Washington Nationals	5th Anniversary of 2019 World Series Championship

=== Throwbacks ===
- The Cardinals and Giants wore their Negro leagues throwbacks for the game at Rickwood Field. The Giants wore their white San Francisco Sea Lions uniforms, while the Cardinals wore their gray St. Louis Stars uniforms. Both teams also wore a #24 uniform patch in memory of Willie Mays.

=== Other uniforms ===
- The Rangers wore gold-trimmed home uniforms on March 28 and March 30 to commemorate their 2023 World Series championship.
- All players, managers, and umpires wore #42 on April 15, the 77th anniversary of Jackie Robinson's debut in the majors.
- Starting with this season, all players, managers, and umpires wore a #4 patch on June 2 to honor Lou Gehrig day.
- The Giants wore #24 on June 24, the first game at home after Willie Mays died.
- The Pirates wore #21 to honor Roberto Clemente September 15.
- The Blue Jays wore their signature Canada Day red jersey on July 1.

== Venues ==
The Oakland Athletics lease with the Oakland Coliseum expires after the end of the season. On June 15, 2023, the team officially announced they would begin the relocation process to Las Vegas. The move was approved by the other MLB owners on November 16. The Athletics would move into a new 33,000-seat fixed roof ballpark by the 2028 season. On April 4, 2024, the Athletics announced they would play at Sutter Health Park in Sacramento, California for the next three seasons with an option for 2028 before moving to Las Vegas, making this their final season in Oakland.

== Broadcast rights ==
=== Television ===
==== National ====
This was the third year of the existing seven-year deals with ESPN, Fox, TBS, Apple TV+, and MLB Network. This was the first year of a multi-year deal with TelevisaUnivision.

==== Linear television ====
- Fox continued to air their Baseball Night in America and Fox Saturday Baseball slate of exclusive games on Saturday and select Thursday nights. The network aired the game at Rickwood Field, and also aired the 2024 MLB All-Star Game; both being exclusive games. FS1 also broadcasts non-exclusive games, including a game on most Saturday afternoons. Following his retirement, Adam Wainwright joined Fox as a full-time color commentator. He previously had done color commentary for Fox during select playoff games.
- TBS continued to broadcast MLB Tuesday. Most games were blacked out in the home markets of the teams playing, however, TBS was allowed to co-exist once with a team's local broadcast. During the final month of the regular season, TBS' sister network TruTV also aired MLB Race to the Pennant on Tuesday nights. The show featured a whip-around format hosted by Alanna Rizzo and Yonder Alonso. For the first time, TruTV also aired a regular season baseball game, between the Astros and the Padres, on Tuesday, September 17.
- ESPN continued to broadcast Sunday Night Baseball, with the option to show alternate broadcasts. ESPN also exclusively aired six other non-Sunday night games, including a primetime game on opening night, two Wednesday Night Baseball games, one game from the MLB Mexico City Series and one game from the MLB London Series. ESPN also aired both games from the MLB Seoul Series which were blacked out in local markets. To end the regular season, ESPN2 aired a doubleheader featuring the Braves and the Mets. The games were originally scheduled to air on September 25 and 26 but were moved due to Hurricane Helene. The broadcasts were blacked out in New York. The network also had the rights to the 2024 Home Run Derby. During the final three weeks of the season, ESPN or ESPN2 aired Baseball Tonight Special: MLB Squeeze Play on Wednesday nights. The studio show featured whip-around coverage focused on the pennant chase.
- In August 2024, MLB announced a new Spanish-language television agreement with TelevisaUnivision (whose TUDN Radio network holds the main Spanish-language radio rights to the league), under which UniMás and TUDN would air the weekly whiparound show MLB En Vivo on Tuesday nights through the remainder of the season, the weekly studio show MLB Esta Semana (lit. 'MLB This Week') on Saturday nights, and postseason coverage. Coverage is also streamed on Vix. Univision talent includes Antonio de Valdés and Enrique Burak as hosts, Daniel Nohra and Luis Quiñones as play-by-play commentators and Luis Alberto Martínez and Daniel Schvarztman as reporters and guest analysts.
- MLB Network continued to broadcast games daily. While most games were simulcasts of the home teams' regional sports network broadcasts, select games were produced by the network under its MLB Network Showcase banner. All games were blacked out in the home markets of the teams playing.
- On November 1, Bob Costas announced his retirement from play-by-play duties. Costas has called Major League games starting in 1980, mainly working for NBC, The Baseball Network (as part of the NBC broadcast crew), MLB Network, and TBS during this span.

==== Streaming ====
- This is the first regular season that the streaming service Max will simulcast TNT Sports (TNT, TBS, and TruTV) games on its Bleacher Report Sports Add-on tier.
- Apple TV+ continues to hold the rights to Friday Night Baseball. Apple had option to opt out of the Friday Night Baseball deal prior to this season, however on March 7 it announced that it would not opt out therefore it would not be able to exit the agreement until it expires in the 2028 season. This would also be the second year of DirecTV's sub-licensing agreement to show these games to commercial establishments.
- The Roku Channel replaced Peacock as the home for MLB Sunday Leadoff under a new 3 year contract. Games are also available to MLB.tv customers blackout-free.
- This was the final season that ESPN+ to hold onto the rights to stream one game (produced by the RSN's) a day. All games are blacked out in local markets.

==== Postseason ====
During the postseason, the ESPN networks and ABC aired all four Wild Card Series. TNT Sports (TNT, TBS, and TruTV) carried the American League Division Series and the American League Championship Series, and Fox Sports (Fox and FS1) broadcast the National League Division Series, the National League Championship Series, and the World Series.

ESPN Deportes and Fox Deportes hold rights to Spanish-language broadcasts of the postseason games aired by ESPN and Fox respectively. As part of MLB's agreement with TelevisaUnivision, Spanish-language coverage of the ALDS and ALCS aired on TUDN, UniMás, and Univision, and streaming on Vix. Spanish language coverage of Game 1 of the 2024 World Series also aired on Univision, marking the first time that a Spanish language network has aired the World Series on broadcast television.

=== Local ===
- On October 31, 2023, the Minnesota Twins announced that television play-by-play announcer Dick Bremer would leave the booth to join the team's front office as its special assistant. On December 1, the Twins replaced Bremer with Cory Provus, and Kris Atteberry took Provus' place as the radio play-by-play announcer.
- On November 9, Jason Benetti left the Chicago White Sox to join the Detroit Tigers as its lead television play-by-play announcer. Benetti replaced Matt Shepard whose contract was not renewed by Bally Sports Detroit. Dan Dickerson, the team's lead radio play-by-play announcer, will call games when Benetti has assignments with Fox Sports.
- On December 18, C. J. Nitkowski left the Texas Rangers to join the Atlanta Braves as its primary television analyst. Jeff Francoeur, who served as the Braves' primary analyst the previous season, will continue to make occasional appearances.
- On January 25, 2024, the Chicago White Sox announced John Schriffen as their lead television play-by-play announcer, replacing Jason Benetti who departed to join the Detroit Tigers as their lead play-by-play television announcer.
- On February 13, the Oakland Athletics announced Jenny Cavnar as their lead television play-by-play announcer. She will be the first woman to be the primary play-by-play voice of an MLB team. On February 20, the Athletics also hired Chris Caray, son of St. Louis Cardinals announcer Chip Caray, to serve as Cavnar's backup.
- On February 13, the Texas Rangers' broadcast team for 2024 was announced with Mike Bacsik, Dave Valle and David Murphy splitting analyst duties and Jared Sandler taking over as the backup TV play-by-play announcer behind Dave Raymond. The trio of Bacsik, Valle and Murphy replaced C. J. Nitkowski who joined the Braves broadcast team.
- On April 29, SportsNet Pittsburgh, the home of the Pirates, launched SNP 360, which is the networks' in-market direct-to-consumer streaming service.

==== AT&T SportsNet closure ====
Warner Bros. Discovery (WBD) wound down its AT&T SportsNet regional sports network (RSN) business prior to the start of the 2024 season. The move affected the Colorado Rockies on AT&T SportsNet Rocky Mountain, the Houston Astros on AT&T SportsNet Southwest, and the Pittsburgh Pirates on AT&T SportsNet Pittsburgh.

The Astros and the NBA's Houston Rockets took over AT&T SportsNet Southwest and rebranded it to the Space City Home Network after the end of the Astros' regular season on October 3, 2023. Fenway Sports Group, owners of the NHL's Pittsburgh Penguins and Boston Red Sox, took over AT&T SportsNet Pittsburgh, rebranding it to just SportsNet Pittsburgh on October 2, 2023. On December 13, 2023, the Pirates announced they would jointly own SportsNet Pittsburgh beginning on January 1, 2024. NESN, through Fenway Sports Group, will operate the network. In February, MLB Local Media took over production of Rockies games.

WBD had owned a 29% share of Root Sports Northwest, the Mariners' RSN, through the end of the 2023 season, and had produced Mariners telecasts. The Mariners took full control of the network on January 1, 2024.

==== Diamond Sports bankruptcy ====
This would be the second season affected by the February 2023 bankruptcy of Diamond Sports Group, owners of the Bally Sports regional sports networks.

On February 2, 2024, Diamond Sports announced agreements with the Rangers, Guardians, and Twins that will result in a decreased rights fee and will end their contracts with Diamond after the 2024 season.

==== Closure of NBC Sports Chicago ====
On September 30, 2024, NBC Sports Chicago, the television home of the White Sox, ended its operations after 20 years. The White Sox, the NHL's Chicago Blackhawks and the NBA's Chicago Bulls will move to the new Chicago Sports Network (CHSN) in the autumn as a joint venture with Standard Media Group.

=== Radio ===
==== Local ====
- On December 2, 2023, the Arizona Diamondbacks promoted Chris Garagiola as its primary radio announcer, replacing Greg Schulte. Garagiola is the grandson of long-time broadcaster Joe Garagiola and son of former Diamondbacks general manager Joe Garagiola Jr.
- On April 15, New York Yankees radio announcer John Sterling announced his retirement. Sterling had been the radio voice of the Yankees since 1989 and also called games for the Atlanta Braves from 1982 to 1987. The Yankees replaced Sterling with Justin Shackil and Emmanuel Berbari on radio play-by-play. On September 6, Sterling announced he would briefly come out of retirement to call the Yankees' final regular-season series and the postseason.
- On July 10, Oakland Athletics radio announcer Vince Cotroneo announced his departure from the team after the season. Cotroneo served as the radio voice of the Athletics beginning in 2006 and also worked for the Houston Astros from 1991 to 1997, and the Texas Rangers from 1998 to 2003.
- On September 15, Boston Red Sox radio announcer Joe Castiglione announced his retirement at the end of the season. Castiglione, the 2024 Ford C. Frick Award winner, has been with the Red Sox since 1983 and previously called games for the Cleveland Indians and the Milwaukee Brewers.

== Retirements ==
The following players and coaches retired during the 2024 season and before the start of the 2025 campaign:

- Shin-Soo Choo – December 14, 2023 (announced); retired at end of season
- Tim Lopes – March 28, 2024
- William Woods – April 2
- Stephen Strasburg – April 6
- Beau Taylor – April 14
- Khris Davis – May 12
- Dylan Bundy – May 13
- Clint Frazier – July 3
- Kevin Kiermaier – July 24 (announced); retired at end of season
- Joey Votto – August 21
- Daniel Castano – September 4
- Elvis Andrus – September 6
- James Paxton – September 11 (announced); retired at end of season
- Matt Adams – September 15
- Charlie Culberson – September 19
- Charlie Blackmon – September 23 (announced); retired at end of season
- Marwin González – September 25
- Daniel Hudson – October 31
- Alex Kirilloff – October 31
- Brandon Crawford – November 27
- Casey Sadler – November 27
- Wil Myers – December 22
- Ehire Adrianza – December 24
- Kevin Plawecki – January 18, 2025
- Andrew Knapp – January 20
- Tyler Cyr – January 24
- Richard Bleier – February 11
- Mike Moustakas – March 3

== Retired numbers ==
- Dwight Gooden had his No. 16 retired by the New York Mets on April 14. This was the eighth number retired by the team.
- Darryl Strawberry had his No. 18 retired by the New York Mets on June 1. This was the ninth number retired by the team.
- Jim Leyland had his No. 10 retired by the Detroit Tigers on August 3. This was the tenth number retired by the team.

== See also ==
- 2024 in baseball
