= Brian Jordan =

American baseball and football player (born 1967)

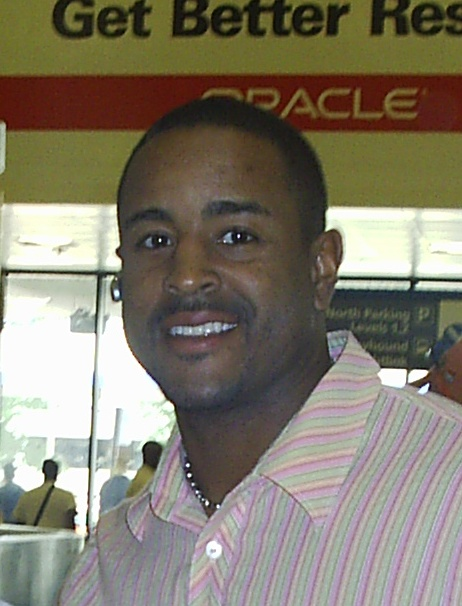
- Outfielder
- Born: March 29, 1967 (age 59); Baltimore, Maryland, U.S.
- Batted: Right Threw: Right

MLB debut
- April 8, 1992, for the St. Louis Cardinals

Last MLB appearance
- September 30, 2006, for the Atlanta Braves

MLB statistics
- Batting average: .282
- Home runs: 184
- Runs batted in: 821
- Stats at Baseball Reference

Teams
- St. Louis Cardinals (1992–1998); Atlanta Braves (1999–2001); Los Angeles Dodgers (2002–2003); Texas Rangers (2004); Atlanta Braves (2005–2006)

Career highlights and awards
- All-Star (1999)
- Football career
No. 40
- Position: Safety
Personal information
- Listed height: 5 ft 11 in (1.80 m)
- Listed weight: 205 lb (93 kg)
Career information
- High school: Milford Mill (Baltimore, Maryland)
- College: Richmond (1985–1988)
- NFL draft: 1989: 7th round, 173rd overall pick
Career history
- Buffalo Bills (1989)*; Atlanta Falcons (1989–1991)
- * Offseason or practice squad member only
Career NFL statistics
- Interceptions: 5
- Fumbles recovered: 4
- Safeties: 2
- Stats at Pro Football Reference

Brian O'Neal Jordan (born March 29, 1967) is an American former professional baseball and football player. Jordan played in the National Football League (NFL) for the Atlanta Falcons as a safety from 1989 to 1991, and played in Major League Baseball (MLB) for the St. Louis Cardinals, Atlanta Braves, Los Angeles Dodgers, and Texas Rangers as an outfielder from 1992 to 2006. Jordan was an MLB All-Star in 1999.

== Baseball and football ==
Jordan was a sports star at Milford Mill High School in Baltimore, Maryland, and he graduated from the University of Richmond. He was selected in the first round of the 1988 MLB draft by the St. Louis Cardinals. In the 1989 NFL draft, he was taken in the seventh round by the Buffalo Bills but was cut in training camp.

While he played in the Cardinals' minor league system, Jordan also played defensive back for the Falcons from 1989 to 1991. He had five interceptions and four sacks in his brief NFL career. He led Atlanta in tackles and was voted as an alternate to the National Football Conference Pro Bowl team during the 1991 season.

In June 1992 Jordan signed a new contract with St Louis giving him a $1.7 million signing bonus to give up football and play baseball exclusively, ending his football career.

== St. Louis Cardinals ==
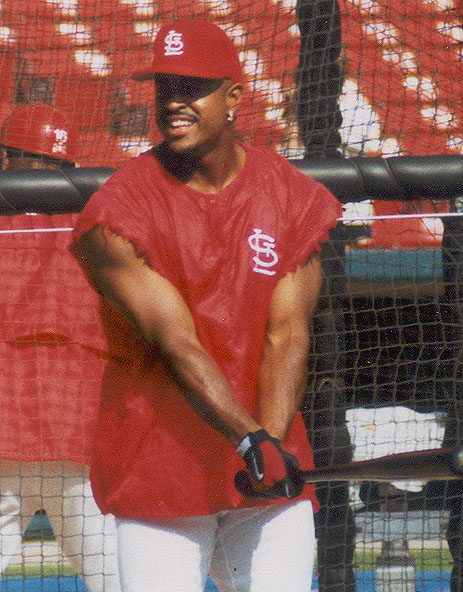
Batting practice with the Cardinals

Jordan made his MLB debut on April 8, 1992, with the Cardinals. He played mostly as a utility outfielder during his first three seasons, but in his first full year, in 1995, his stats included 145 hits, 20 doubles, and a .296 batting average in 490 at-bats. He also hit 22 home runs and 81 RBIs. He built on his success in 1996, hitting .310 with 104 RBIs and a .349 on-base percentage, playing mostly as the right fielder and cleanup hitter for the Cardinals. Jordan posted a .422 batting average with runners in scoring position (RISP), which became the Cardinals' all-time highest mark (the RISP statistic has been officially and reliably kept since 1974), until outfielder Allen Craig topped it in 2013. He also led the Major Leagues in batting average with the bases loaded. In the postseason that year, Jordan hit .333 in the NLDS and had a game-winning home run in Game 4 of the 1996 NLCS.

Shrugging off a 1997 season in which he suffered injuries and hit .234 with no home runs, Jordan scored 100 runs, hit 25 home runs, batted a career-high .316, and had a .534 slugging percentage in 1998.

== Atlanta Braves ==
His stats in 1998 helped earn Jordan a $21.3 million contract with the Atlanta Braves. Jordan had a strong April and May to help carry the Braves early in the 1999 season. This propelled him to his only All-Star appearance. He finished the season with 100 runs again and drove in 115 runs. In the 1999 NLDS against the Houston Astros, Jordan batted .471, had the game-winning double in the 12th inning of Game 3, and drove in seven of Atlanta's 18 runs during the series. He contributed two home runs in the 1999 NLCS, but went 1 for 13 in his only World Series appearance.

Jordan's batting average and RBI totals dipped in 2000, but in 2001 Jordan hit 25 homers with a .295 average and was superb in the final games of the season, helping to push the Braves to their tenth-straight division title after a tight race with the Philadelphia Phillies and New York Mets.

== Later career ==
He was involved in a multiplayer trade on January 15, 2002. Atlanta sent him to the Los Angeles Dodgers with pitcher Odalis Pérez for Gary Sheffield.

After a solid season in 2002 in which he hit .285, injuries decreased Jordan's playing time in 2003. Jordan signed a one-year contract with the Texas Rangers in 2004; he batted .222 and again missed chunks of time with injuries. In 2005, he returned to the Braves, spending most of the season on the disabled list with left knee inflammation while rookie sensation Jeff Francoeur took over in right field. Relying more on his veteran savvy than athletic ability at this point, he made the team again in 2006, but was again limited to a platoon role at first base before going on the disabled list. Jordan retired as a player after the 2006 season.

== Career statistics ==
In 1456 games over 15 seasons, Jordan posted a .282 batting average (1454-for-5160) with 755 runs, 267 doubles, 37 triples, 184 home runs, 821 RBI, 119 stolen bases, 353 bases on balls, .333 on-base percentage and .455 slugging percentage. He finished his career with a .988 fielding percentage playing at all three outfield positions and first base. In 38 postseason games, he hit .250 (35-for-140) with 16 runs, 6 doubles, 6 home runs, 27 RBI and 11 walks.

== Post-baseball ==
Jordan served as a TV pre-game analyst for the Atlanta Braves on Braves Live, the official pregame show on Bally Sports Southeast and Bally Sports South until March 2023. He is active in the Atlanta community with the Brian Jordan Foundation and authored the semi-autobiographical children's book I Told You I Can Play!

In 2009, he was named as a television commentator for the Gwinnett Braves, the Triple–A affiliate of the Atlanta Braves. Jordan was paired with Josh Caray for a 25-game television schedule.

== See also ==
- List of athletes who played in Major League Baseball and the National Football League
- List of Major League Baseball career putouts as a right fielder leaders
- List of multi-sport athletes
- List of people from Baltimore

Awards and achievements
Preceded by Barry Bonds	National League Player of the Month; September 2002	Succeeded by Todd Helton
