= Chip Caray =

American sportscaster (born 1965)

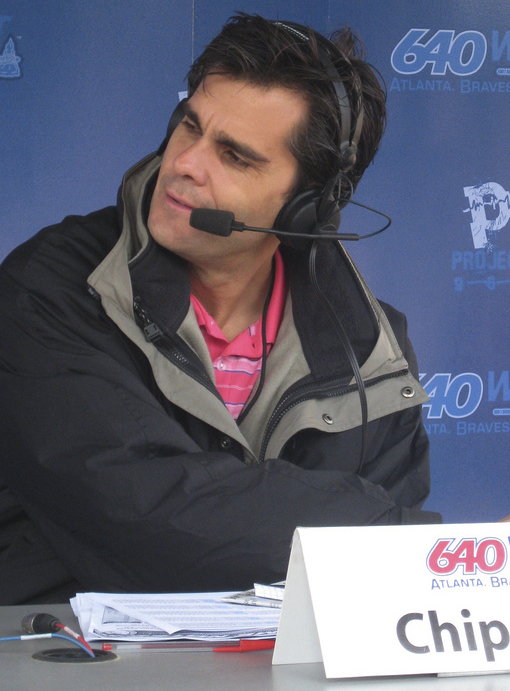
- Caray in 2009.
- Born: Harry Christopher Caray III; February 27, 1965 (age 61); St. Louis, Missouri, U.S.
- Education: University of Georgia; Journalism
- Occupation: Sports commentator
- Years active: 1987–present
- Spouse: Susan
- Children: 4; including Chris
- Family: Skip Caray (father); Harry Caray (grandfather)

Harry Christopher "Chip" Caray III (born February 27, 1965) is an American sports commentator who is the telecast play-by-play announcer for the St. Louis Cardinals of Major League Baseball (MLB). He has previously served as play-by-play announcer for the Seattle Mariners from 1993 to 1995, Chicago Cubs from 1998 to 2004, and Atlanta Braves from 2005 to 2022. He is the son of commentator Skip Caray, the grandson of commentator Harry Caray, and the father of commentator Chris Caray.

== Biography ==
=== Education and early career ===
Caray graduated from Parkway West High School in Chesterfield, Missouri, in 1983. He graduated from the University of Georgia in 1987 with a degree in journalism. Before his first job with Fox, he worked with local television stations in Panama City, Florida, and Greensboro, North Carolina. He was the play-by-play broadcaster for the Orlando Magic of the NBA from 1989 to 1998.

Caray worked on baseball games for the Seattle Mariners of the American League from 1993 to 1995. While broadcasting with the Mariners, Caray received a two-game tryout with the St. Louis Cardinals. After the 1994 season, he was expected to sign with St. Louis, but chose instead to remain with Seattle. Caray was also a broadcaster for the first edition of Major League Baseball on Fox in 1996.

=== Chicago Cubs ===
In December 1997, Chip Caray was hired to work alongside his grandfather as broadcaster for the Chicago Cubs. Harry Caray died in February 1998, and Chip stayed with the team and took his grandfather's place as "the voice of the Cubs." He would go on to serve as their announcer for seven seasons, with Steve Stone providing color commentary for most of those years. Both Caray and Stone left the Cubs after the 2004 season.

=== TBS ===
On the final day of the 2004 season, Caray announced that he had signed a long-term contract with both TBS and Clear Channel to work alongside his father, Skip, broadcasting games for the Atlanta Braves, staying closer to his family, who lived in Orlando, Florida. He also became a broadcaster for TBS's college football coverage of the Big 12 and Pac-10.

In 2007, TBS began broadcasting the Major League Baseball playoffs. Caray was named the main play-by-play broadcaster for TBS during its coverage of the playoffs. TBS would cover all Division Series games and the National League Championship Series. Hall of Fame player Tony Gwynn called the playoff games with Caray.

Caray was criticized for making factual mistakes during postseason broadcasts on TBS. In response to such criticisms, Caray said, "It wasn't the job that I had when I came here in the first place. It would be like being a pinch-hitter or being a relief pitcher that works once every 10 days. I'm better when I work more." On November 30, 2009, TBS announced that Caray and the network decided to part ways.

=== Fox Sports South ===
On December 21, 2009, Fox Sports South and SportSouth announced that Caray would be the play-by-play announcer for all 105 Braves games on the networks. The deal also included selected college basketball games on the regional sports networks.

=== Bally Sports Midwest/FanDuel Sports Network Midwest/Cardinals.TV ===
On January 23, 2023, it was announced that Caray would become the play-by-play announcer for the St. Louis Cardinals, taking over for longtime broadcaster Dan McLaughlin. His grandfather, Harry Caray, had begun his career as the voice of the Cardinals.

During the June 21, 2025 game between the Cardinals and Cincinnati Reds, Caray accidentally misread a promo for the team’s Disability Pride Night, substituting the word “flag” with a homophobic slur. Dead air followed for over 30 seconds before Caray continued on with the game as if nothing happened. FanDuel Sports Network Midwest told the website Front Office Sports it considered the mistake to be an “honest” one, and that he would not be punished for it.

=== Career timeline ===
- 1989–1998: Orlando Magic play-by-play
- 1991–1992: Atlanta Braves play-by-play on TBS and Atlanta Braves Radio Network
- 1993–1995: Seattle Mariners play-by-play
- 1996–1998: Major League Baseball on Fox Studio host
- 1999–2000: Major League Baseball on Fox play-by-play
- 1998–2004: Chicago Cubs play-by-play on WGN-TV and FSN Chicago
- 2005–2009: Atlanta Braves play-by-play on TBS, Peachtree TV and Atlanta Braves Radio Network
- 2007–2009: MLB on TBS Lead play-by-play
- 2010–2022: Atlanta Braves play-by-play on Bally Sports
- 2023–present: St. Louis Cardinals play-by-play on Bally Sports Midwest/FanDuel Sports Network Midwest/Cardinals.TV

== Family ==
Chip Caray's grandfather, Harry, was famous for calling games of the St. Louis Cardinals, Chicago White Sox, and Chicago Cubs. His father, Skip, was the longtime broadcaster for the Atlanta Braves until he died in 2008. Chip Caray occasionally imitates his father with sarcastic comments made in a high, nasal voice. Caray also has a half-brother, Josh Caray, who is the play-by-play announcer for the Rocket City Trash Pandas, the Double-A affiliate of the Los Angeles Angels.

Caray and his wife have four children. Caray's twin sons, Chris and Stefan, attended the University of Georgia and began their professional sportscasting career with the Amarillo Sod Poodles, the Texas League affiliate of the Arizona Diamondbacks. In 2023, they were placed in the Arizona Fall League broadcast pool. Chip met son Chris when the Cardinals played the Athletics in Oakland on April 15, 2024. Chris was broadcasting Athletics' games for NBC Sports California in his second big-league series, while Chip called the Cardinals games. Chris is in a play-by-play rotation with Jenny Cavnar, who has the bulk of the games and is the first woman to be in a team's primary role. Caray and his son Stefan called an MLB Spring Breakout game in 2025.

Preceded by Harry Caray	Chicago Cubs Television Play-By-Play Announcer; 1998–2004	Succeeded by Len Kasper
Preceded by First	Lead play-by-play announcer, Major League Baseball on TBS; 2007–2009	Succeeded by Ernie Johnson Jr.
Preceded by First	Studio host, Major League Baseball on Fox; 1996–1998	Succeeded by Keith Olbermann
