= Harry Caray =

American sportscaster (1914–1998)

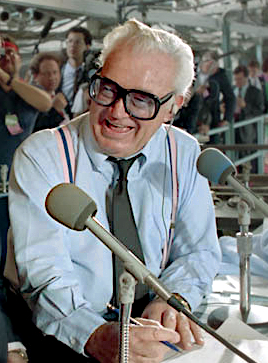
- Caray in the Wrigley Field booth in 1988
- Broadcaster
- Born: March 1, 1914; St. Louis, Missouri, U.S.
- Died: February 18, 1998 (aged 83); Rancho Mirage, California, U.S.

Teams
- As Broadcaster: St. Louis Browns (1945–1946); St. Louis Cardinals (1945–1969); Oakland Athletics (1970); Chicago White Sox (1971–1981); Chicago Cubs (1982–1997)

Career highlights and awards
- Ford C. Frick Award (1989); National Radio Hall of Fame (1990)

Harry Christopher Caray (né Carabina; March 1, 1914 – February 18, 1998) was an American radio and television sportscaster. During his career he called the play-by-play for five Major League Baseball teams, beginning with 25 years of calling the games of the St. Louis Cardinals (with two of those years also spent calling games for the St. Louis Browns). After a year working for the Oakland Athletics and 11 years with the Chicago White Sox, Caray spent the last 16 years of his career as the announcer for the Chicago Cubs.

== Early life ==
Caray was born Harry Christopher Carabina to an Italian father and Romanian mother in St. Louis. He was 14 when his mother, Daisy Argint, died from complications due to pneumonia. Caray did not have much recollection of his father, who went off to fight in World War I. Caray went to live with his uncle John Argint and Aunt Doxie at 1909 LaSalle Avenue. Caray attended high school at Webster Groves High School. In his youth, Caray was a talented baseball player, and was offered a roster spot by the University of Alabama. Due to financial woes, Caray could not accept. Caray then tried to enlist into the Armed Forces, but was denied due to his poor eyesight. Unable to play baseball professionally, he sold gym equipment before investigating announcing as a way to stay involved in the game. He then spent a few years learning the trade at radio stations in Joliet, Illinois, and Kalamazoo, Michigan. While in Joliet, WCLS station manager Bob Holt suggested that Harry change his surname from Carabina (because according to Holt, it sounded too awkward on the air) to Caray.

== Career ==
=== Early Career ===
Caray's entry into broadcasting began when he wrote to Merle Jones, general manager of St. Louis station KMOX, asking for an announcing job. Jones arranged an audition and, concluding that Caray had a good voice but little experience, helped him obtain a sports announcer position at WCLS in Joliet, where he covered high school and junior college basketball, softball, and bowling leagues. After about a year and a half he became sports director at WKZO in Kalamazoo, working alongside newscaster Paul Harvey, hosting pregame and postgame shows for Detroit Tigers broadcasts, and calling Western Michigan University games. After he was rejected by the military for poor eyesight, he returned to St. Louis and by early 1944 was at KXOX, where his nightly sports show mixed news with editorial criticism. That fall he was hired to call St. Louis Flyers hockey and college basketball for Griesedieck Brothers Brewery on WIL, a relationship that led to his 1945 assignment to Cardinals and Browns games.

=== St. Louis Cardinals and Browns ===
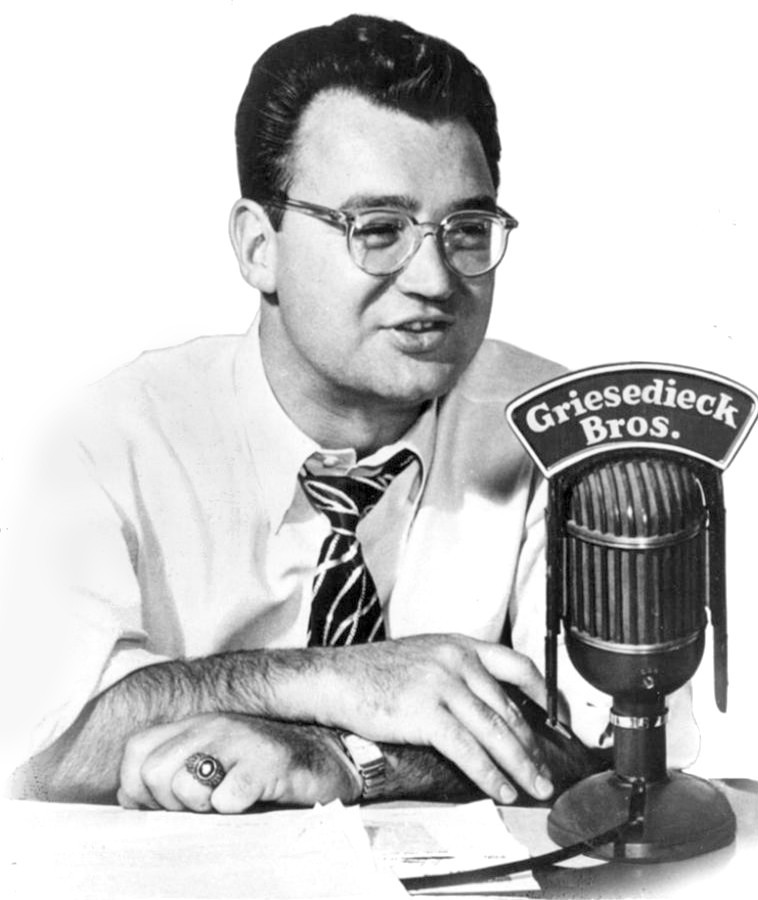
Caray in 1951, when he was with the St. Louis Cardinals. The team's broadcasts were sponsored by the Griesedieck Brothers brewery prior to its purchase by Anheuser-Busch in 1953.

Caray caught his break when he landed a job with the National League St. Louis Cardinals in 1945 and, according to several histories of the franchise, proved as adept at selling the sponsor's beer as at the play-by-play description. Caray teamed with former major-league catcher Gabby Street to call Cardinals games through 1950, as well as those of the American League St. Louis Browns in 1945 and 1946. His subsequent partners in the Cardinals' booth included Stretch Miller, Gus Mancuso, Milo Hamilton, Joe Garagiola, and Jack Buck.

Immediately preceding the Cardinals job, Caray announced hockey games for the St. Louis Flyers, teaming with former NHL defenseman Ralph "Bouncer" Taylor. Caray was also seen as influential enough that he could affect team personnel moves; Peter Golenbock (in The Spirit of St. Louis: A History of the St. Louis Cardinals and Browns) has suggested that Caray may have had a partial involvement in the maneuvering that led to the exit of general manager Bing Devine, the man who had assembled the team that won the 1964 World Series, and of field manager Johnny Keane, whose rumored successor, Leo Durocher, was believed to have been supported by Caray for the job. Caray, however, stated in his autobiography that he liked Johnny Keane as a manager, and did not want to be involved in Keane's dismissal. As the Cardinals' announcer, Caray helped broadcast three World Series (1964, 1967, and 1968) on NBC. He also broadcast the 1957 All-Star Game (played in St. Louis) on NBC Radio, and had the call for Stan Musial's 3,000th hit on May 13, 1958.

In November 1968, Caray was nearly killed after being struck by an automobile while crossing a street in St. Louis; he suffered two broken legs in the accident, but recuperated in time to return to the broadcast booth for the start of the 1969 season. Gussie Busch, the Cardinals' president and then-CEO of team owners Anheuser-Busch, spent lavishly to ensure Caray recovered, flying him on the company's planes to a company facility in Florida to rehabilitate and recuperate. On Opening Day, fans cheered when he dramatically threw aside the two canes he had been using to cross the field and continued to the broadcast booth under his own power.

Following the 1969 season, the Cardinals declined to renew Caray's contract after he had called their games for 25 seasons, his longest tenure with any sports team. The team stated that the action had been taken on the recommendation of Anheuser-Busch's marketing department, but declined to offer specifics. At a news conference afterward, during which he drank conspicuously from a can of Schlitz (then a major competitor to Anheuser-Busch), Caray dismissed that claim, saying no one was better at selling beer than he had been. Instead, he suggested, he had been the victim of rumors that he'd had an affair with Gussie Busch's daughter-in-law.

=== Oakland Athletics ===
He spent one season broadcasting for the Oakland Athletics in 1970 before, as he often told interviewers, he grew tired of owner Charles O. Finley's interference and accepted a job with the Chicago White Sox. (Apparently the feeling was mutual; Finley later said that "that shit [Caray] pulled in St. Louis didn't go over here.") Finley wanted Caray to change his broadcast chant of "Holy Cow" to "Holy Mule".

However, there were some reports that Caray and Finley did, in fact, work well with each other and that Caray's strained relationship with the A's came from longtime A's announcer Monte Moore; Caray was loose and free-wheeling while Moore was more restrained and sedate.

Coincidentally, 54 years after that season, his great-grandson Chris would become a broadcaster for the club.

=== Chicago White Sox ===
Caray joined the Chicago White Sox in 1971 and quickly became popular with the South Side faithful, enjoying a reputation for joviality and public carousing (sometimes doing home game broadcasts shirtless from the bleachers). Because the financially struggling team could not match the salary Caray had earned in Oakland, it tied part of his pay to attendance, offering a $10,000 bonus for every 100,000 fans above 600,000. He wasn't always popular with players, however, as Caray also had a reputation for being critical of home team blunders. During his tenure with the White Sox, Caray was teamed with many color analysts who didn't work out well, including Bob Waller, Bill Mercer and ex-Major League catcher J. C. Martin, among others. He added television work on WSNS-TV in 1973, calling the first and last three innings on TV and the middle three on radio. Owner John Allyn was prepared to fire him after the 1975 season, but Bill Veeck's investor group bought the team that December and kept him. But in 1976, during a game against the Texas Rangers, Caray had former outfielder Jimmy Piersall (who was working for the Rangers at the time) as a guest in the White Sox booth that night. The tandem proved to work so well that Piersall was hired to be Caray's partner in the White Sox radio and TV booth beginning in 1977.

Among Caray's experiences during his time with the White Sox was the infamous "Disco Demolition Night" promotion. On July 12, 1979, what began as a promotional effort by Chicago radio station WLUP, the station's popular DJ Steve Dahl, and the Sox to sell seats at a White Sox/Detroit Tigers double-header resulted in a debacle. As Dahl blew up a crate full of disco records on the field after the first game had ended, thousands of rowdy fans from the sold-out event poured from the stands onto the field at Comiskey Park. Caray and Piersall, via the public address system, tried to calm the crowd and implored them to return to their seats, in vain. Eventually the field was cleared by Chicago Police in riot gear and the White Sox were forced to forfeit the second game of the double-header due to the extensive damage done to the playing field. Caray left the White Sox after the 1981 season, replaced by Don Drysdale.

In 1981, White Sox owners Jerry Reinsdorf and Eddie Einhorn planned to move the team's telecasts to subscription television, a plan Caray opposed. Caray contacted the Cubs about succeeding the retiring Jack Brickhouse, and his hiring was announced that November, ending his 11 seasons with the White Sox.

=== Chicago Cubs ===
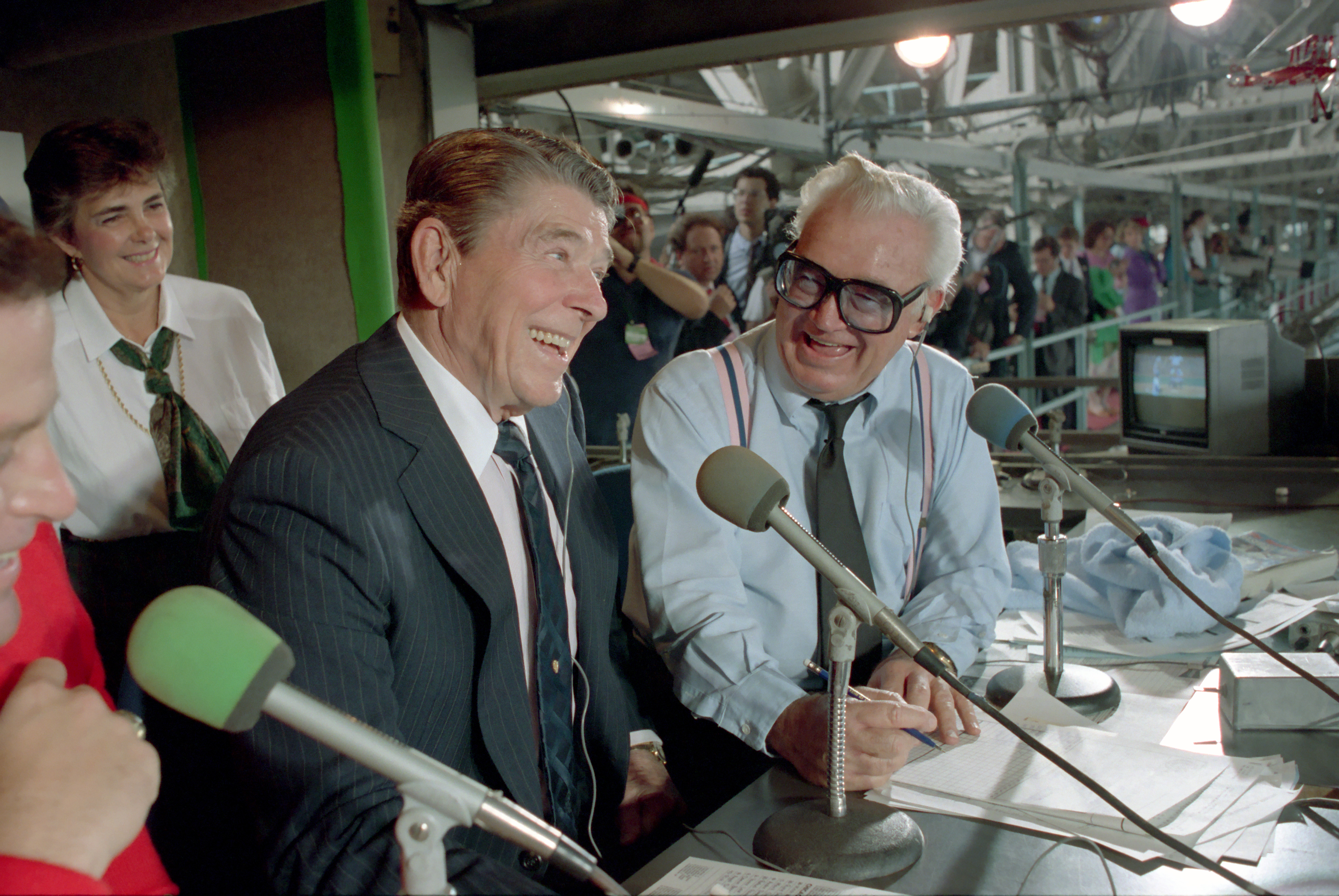
U.S. President Ronald Reagan in the press box with Caray during a 1988 game at Wrigley Field

Caray increased his renown after joining the North Side Cubs following the 1981 season. In contrast to the "SportsVision" concept, the Cubs' own television outlet, WGN-TV, had become among the first of the cable television superstations, offering their programming to providers across the United States for free, and Caray became as famous nationwide as he had long been on the South Side and, previously, in St. Louis. In fact, Caray had already been affiliated with WGN for some years by then, as WGN actually produced the White Sox games for broadcast on competitor WSNS-TV, and Caray was a frequent sportscaster on the station's newscasts. Caray succeeded longtime Cubs broadcaster Jack Brickhouse, a beloved announcer and Chicago media fixture.

The timing worked in Caray's favor, as the Cubs ended up winning the National League East division title in 1984 with WGN-TV's nationwide audience following along. Millions came to love the microphone-swinging Caray, continuing his White Sox practice of leading the home crowd in singing "Take Me Out to the Ball Game" during the seventh inning stretch, mimicking his mannerisms, his gravelly voice, his habit of mispronouncing or slurring some players' names—which some of the players mimicked in turn—and even his trademark barrel-shaped wide-rimmed glasses.

In February 1987, Caray suffered a stroke while at his winter home near Palm Springs, California, just prior to spring training for the Cubs' 1987 season. This led to his absence from the broadcast booth through most of the first two months of the regular season, with WGN featuring a series of celebrity guest announcers on game telecasts while Caray recuperated.

Caray returned to the Wrigley Field booth on May 19, 1987, after working with a therapist to restore his speech. During that game he received an on-air telephone call from President Ronald Reagan welcoming him back; Reagan visited the booth and broadcast part of a game on September 30, 1988. That June, Caray fell during a road trip to Miami and was hospitalized, where doctors found an irregular heartbeat.

Caray's national popularity never flagged after that, although time eventually took a toll on him. Nicknamed "The Mayor of Rush Street", a reference to Chicago's famous tavern-dominated neighborhood and Caray's well-known taste for Budweiser, illness and age began to drain some of Caray's skills, even in spite of his remarkable recovery from the 1987 stroke. There were occasional calls for him to retire, but he was kept aboard past WGN's normal mandatory retirement age, an indication of how popular he was. Toward the end of his career, Caray's schedule was limited to home games and road trips to St. Louis and Atlanta.

In December 1997, Caray's grandson Chip Caray was hired to share play-by-play duties for WGN's Cubs broadcasts with Caray for the following season. However, Harry Caray died in February 1998, before the baseball season began, leaving the expected grandfather-grandson partnership in the broadcast booth unrealized.

=== The seventh-inning stretch ===
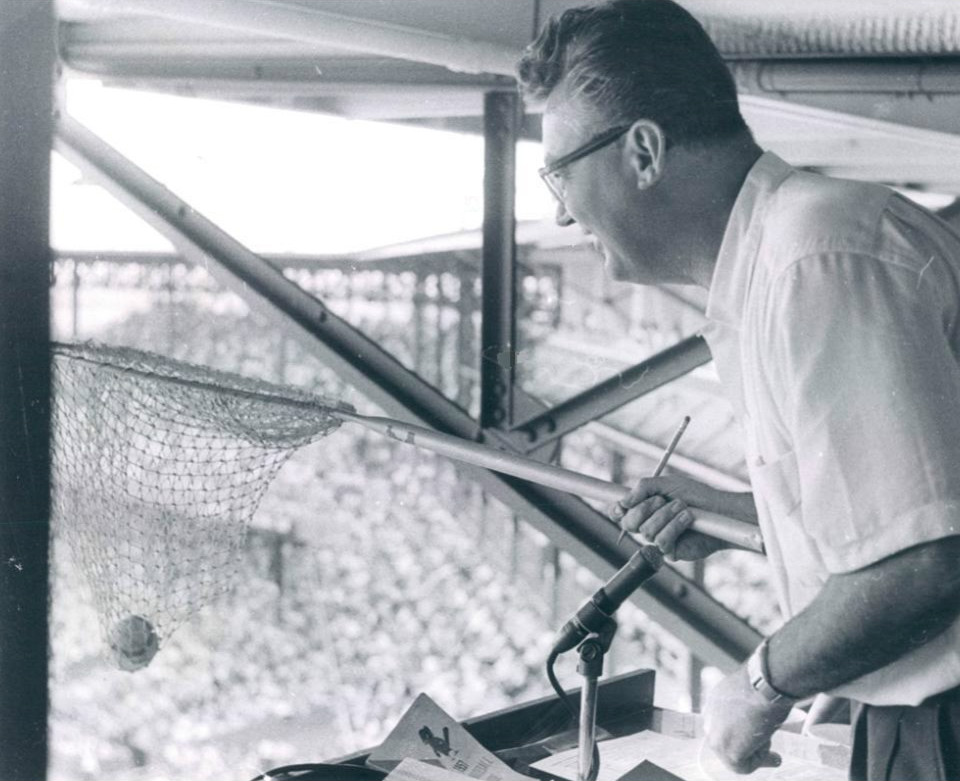
Caray demonstrating how he used a fishing net to catch foul balls in the Cardinals broadcast booth at Sportsman's Park, 1957. He continued this practice when he worked for other teams.

Caray is credited with popularizing the singing of "Take Me Out to the Ball Game" during the seventh-inning stretch.

Throughout his broadcasting career, Caray would sing the song in his booth. There would only be a few people who could hear Caray sing: his broadcast partners, WMAQ Radio producer Jay Scott, and the select fans whose seats were near the booth. Scott suggested that Caray's singing be put on the stadium public address system, in the early 1970s, but Caray and station management rejected the idea. When owner Bill Veeck took over the White Sox in 1976, he would observe Caray and some fans singing the song and wanted to incorporate Caray into a stadium-wide event.

It was a few games into the 1976 season when Veeck secretly placed a public-address microphone into Caray's booth and turned it on once Nancy Faust, the Comiskey Park organist, began playing "Take Me Out to the Ball Game", so that everyone in the park could hear Caray singing. Veeck asked Caray if he would sing regularly, but the announcer initially wanted no part of it. Veeck advised Caray that he had already taped the announcer singing during commercial breaks and said he could play that recording if Caray preferred. When Caray questioned the idea, Veeck explained, "Anybody in the ballpark hearing you sing ‘Take Me Out to the Ball Game’ knows that he can sing as well as you can. Probably better than you can. So he or she sings along. Hell, if you had a good singing voice, you'd intimidate them, and nobody would join in."

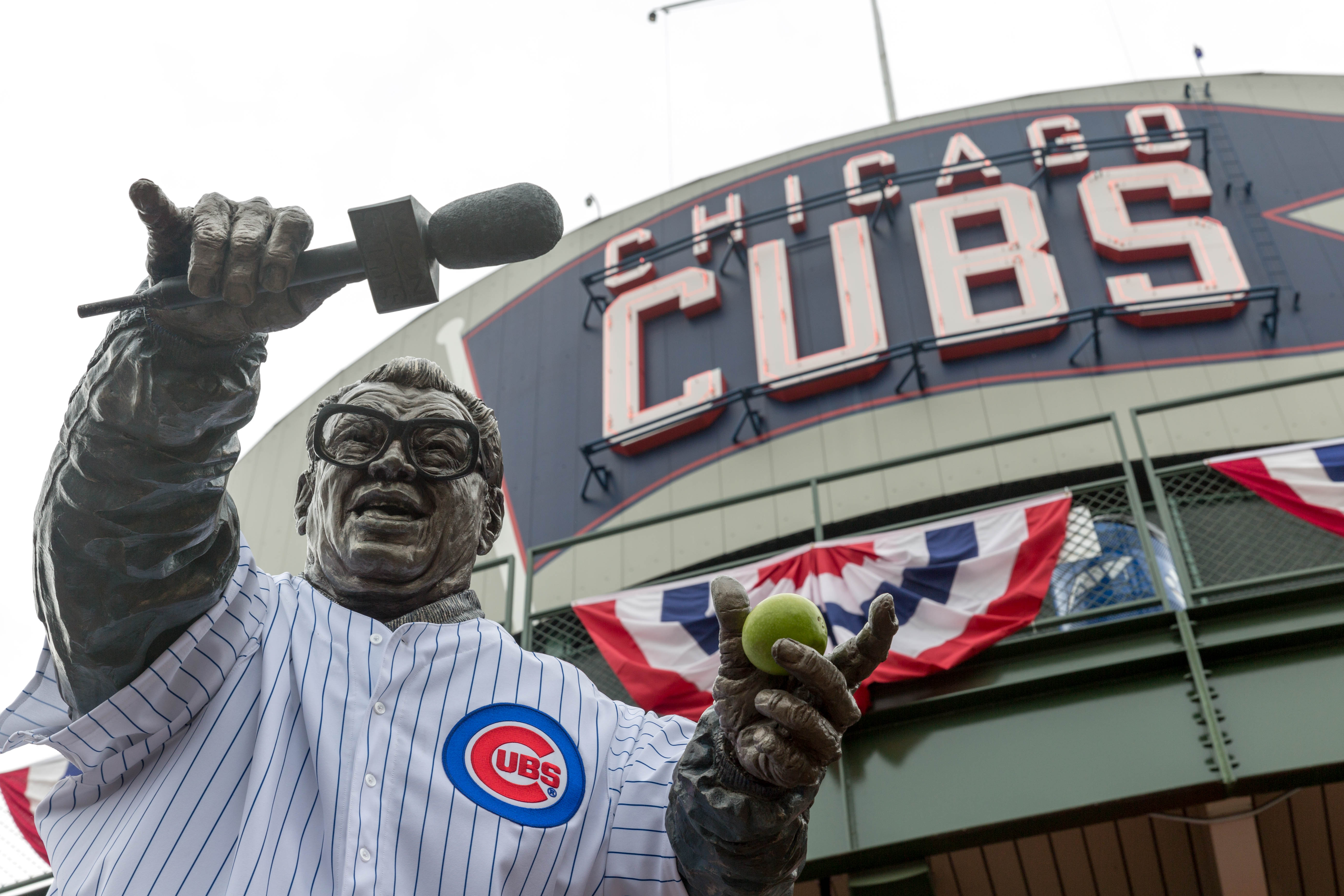
Harry Caray's statue outside Wrigley Field

Caray finally agreed to sing it live, accompanied by Faust on the organ, and went on to become famous for singing the tune, continuing to do so at Wrigley Field after becoming the broadcaster of the Chicago Cubs, using a hand-held microphone and holding it outside the booth window.

Many of these performances began with Caray speaking directly to the baseball fans in attendance either about the state of the day's game, or the Chicago weather, while the park organ held the opening chord of the song. Then with his trademark opening, "All right! Lemme hear ya! Ah-One! Ah-Two! Ah-Three!" Harry would launch into his distinctive, down-tempo version of "Take Me Out to the Ball Game". During his tenure announcing games at Comiskey Park and later Wrigley Field, he would often replace "root, root, root for the home team" with "root, root, root for the White Sox/Cubbies". For the lyrics "One, Two, Three, strikes you're out ..." Caray would usually hold the microphone out to the crowd to punctuate the climactic end of the song. And if the visitors were ahead in that game, Harry would typically make a plea to the home team's offense: "Let's get some runs!"

After Caray died in 1998, the Cubs would bring in guest conductors of the song; this tradition is still alive to this day. His wife, Dutchie, as well as his grandson Chip Caray, were the first people to guest conduct the song following his death.

During the 2009 NHL Winter Classic at Wrigley Field, as the Chicago Blackhawks hosted the Detroit Red Wings on New Year's Day 2009, former Blackhawks players Bobby Hull, Stan Mikita, and Denis Savard and former Cubs players Ryne Sandberg and Ferguson Jenkins sang a hockey-themed version of the seventh-inning stretch; "Take Me Out to the Hockey Game" used lines such as "Root, root, root for the Blackhawks" and "One, two, three pucks, you're out." The Blackhawks would do this again in 2010 during the White Sox–Cubs game at Wrigley Field. This time, it was members of the Stanley Cup winning team.

Major League Baseball rolled out a holographic rendition of Caray performing the song for the Cubs' 2022 Field of Dreams Game against the Cincinnati Reds in Dyersville, Iowa. Reactions to the stunt were mixed, with many observers calling the hologram "creepy" and disrespectful.

=== Personality and style ===
Caray began his broadcasting career in St. Louis, where he was the third person at a local radio station. This meant that he was responsible for the commercials and quick breaks between the play-by-play announcers. His style of delivering the news was different from anybody else in St. Louis; he was critical, he told the truth and held nothing back. This style was typically only used in the newspaper business, so when Caray brought this style to the radio, his ratings and popularity rose exponentially. This led to him beginning to announce Cardinals games with Gabby Street.

Caray had a number of broadcasting partners and colleagues through the years. He had a frosty relationship with Milo Hamilton, his first partner with the Cubs, who felt Caray had pushed him out in St. Louis in the mid-1950s. Hamilton (who'd been the presumptive successor to Jack Brickhouse prior to Caray's hiring) was fired by WGN in 1984; he claimed that station officials told him that the main reason was that Caray did not like him. However, Caray also did not lack for broadcast companions who enjoyed his work and companionship. With the White Sox, his longest-serving partner was Jimmy Piersall; with the Cubs, he was teamed for 14 years with former pitcher Steve Stone.

Caray was known for his unabashed homerism, showing absolute support of the team for which he announced. While advertisers played up his habit of openly rooting for the Cubs from the booth (for example, a 1980s Budweiser ad described him as "Cub Fan, Bud Man" in a Blues Brothers-style parody of "Soul Man"), he had been even less restrained about rooting for the Cardinals when he broadcast for them. He said later that his firing from the Cardinals changed his outlook and made him realize that his passion was for the game itself, and the fans, more than anything else. He was also famous for his frequently exclaimed catchphrase "Holy cow!" when his team hit a home run or turned a difficult play on field; he trained himself to use this expression to avoid any chance of accidentally using profanity on the air. Caray also avoided any risk of mis-calling a home run, using what became a trademark home run call: "It might be ... it could be ... it IS! A home run! Holy cow!" He first used the "It might be ..." part of that expression on the air while covering a college baseball tournament in Kalamazoo, Michigan, in the early 1940s.

Caray was one of the first announcers to step out of the booth while broadcasting a game. Often with his tenure with both the Cubs and White Sox, he would set up in the outfield and broadcast the game from a table amongst the fans. Caray said, "I am the eyes and ears of the fan. If I do not tell the truth, the whole truth, and nothing but the truth, the fan doesn’t want to know." During his tenure with the White Sox, Caray would often announce the game from the outfield bleachers, surrounded by beer cups and fans.

One of his favorite things to do was to find a member of the opposing team and try to say their name backwards. After Caray had a stroke in 1987, this did not occur as often as before. A video of Caray trying to say Mark Grudzielanek's name backwards can be found online.

=== Non-baseball work ===
Though best known and honored for his baseball work, Caray also called ice hockey (St. Louis Flyers), basketball (Saint Louis Billikens, Boston Celtics, and St. Louis Hawks), and college football (Missouri Tigers) in the 1940s, '50s and '60s. Additionally, he broadcast eight Cotton Bowl Classic games (1958–64, 1966) on network radio.

Caray had a reputation for mastering all aspects of broadcasting: writing his own copy, conducting news interviews, writing and presenting editorials, and hosting a sports talk program.

== Personal life ==
Caray was the uncle of actor Tim Dunigan, known for playing many roles on both the screen and stage. His son Skip Caray followed him into the booth as a baseball broadcaster with the Atlanta Braves. Caray's broadcasting legacy was extended to a third-generation, as his grandson Chip Caray replaced Harry as the Cubs' play-by-play announcer from 1998 to 2004. Chip served as the Braves television announcer on Bally Sports South, with his brother Josh serving as Director of Broadcasting and Baseball Information for the minor league Rocket City Trash Pandas. Chip is currently a broadcaster for the St. Louis Cardinals. The Carays expanded to a fourth generation in 2022 when Chip's twin sons Chris and Stefan were named broadcasters for the minor league Amarillo Sod Poodles. For the 2024 season, Chris was hired by NBC Sports California to broadcast the Oakland Athletics as one of two lead broadcasters (alternating) heading into the 2024 season.

On October 23, 1987, Harry Caray's Italian Steakhouse opened in the Chicago Varnish Company Building, a Chicago Landmark building that is also listed on the National Register of Historic Places. There are seven restaurants and an off-premises catering division which bear the Harry Caray name.

=== Rumored affair with Susan Busch ===
Rumors that Caray was having an affair with Susan Busch, wife of August Busch III, the oldest son of Cardinals president Gussie Busch, then a company executive and later CEO of Cardinals' owner Anheuser-Busch, began to circulate after she was involved in a single-car accident near her home in the St. Louis suburb of Ladue late one night in May 1968. She told police she was returning from a visit to "a friend"; the cause of the accident was never disclosed publicly and no further action was taken. However, her marriage to the younger Busch was failing due to his extreme commitment to the family business.

According to Anheuser–Busch historian William Knoedelseder, the two had been seen eating together at Tony's, a popular and well-regarded St. Louis restaurant (where Knoedelseder later worked, and heard the story from more senior staff). Waitstaff present said the two were both extremely inebriated and openly affectionate. They stood out not only because both were well-recognized around St. Louis but because Caray was 22 years older than her. The restaurant's owner had to tell the staff not to stare at the couple.

It also was rumored that the near-fatal car accident Caray suffered later that year was actually intentional and related to the alleged affair. Private investigators working for Busch had found that telephone records showed Caray and Susan Busch had made many calls to each other. They supposedly confronted him about the reported affair while he was in Florida recuperating.

Susan divorced her husband shortly afterwards. She has only spoken about the alleged affair once since then, denying it. While she and the broadcaster were friends, "we were not a romance item by any means", she told the St. Louis Post-Dispatch. Caray cited the rumors of the affair as the real reason the Cardinals declined to renew his contract after the disappointing 1969 season.

Like Susan Busch, Caray, too, denied that the affair had occurred when asked, but according to Knoedelseder was less consistent, sometimes suggesting it had indeed occurred, and usually saying how flattered he was at the idea that a woman as attractive as Susan Busch would see him the same way.

== Death ==
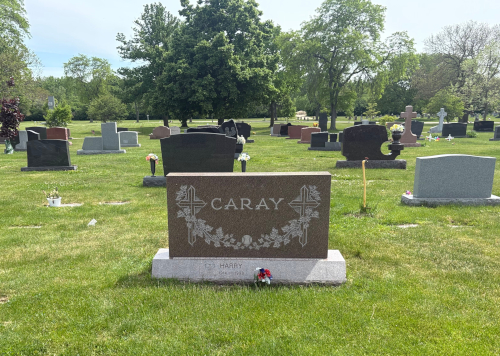
Caray's grave at All Saints Cemetery

Harry Caray died on February 18, 1998, as a result of complications from a heart attack and brain damage. On Valentine's Day, Caray and his wife, "Dutchie" Goldman, were at a Rancho Mirage, California, restaurant celebrating the holiday when Caray collapsed during the meal. Steve Stone's 1999 publication Where’s Harry? suggests that Caray's head made contact with the table, resulting in a loss of consciousness. This has never been confirmed, but is one possibility. Caray was rushed to nearby Eisenhower Medical Center, where he never woke up from his coma and died on February 18, 1998, 11 days away from his 84th birthday.

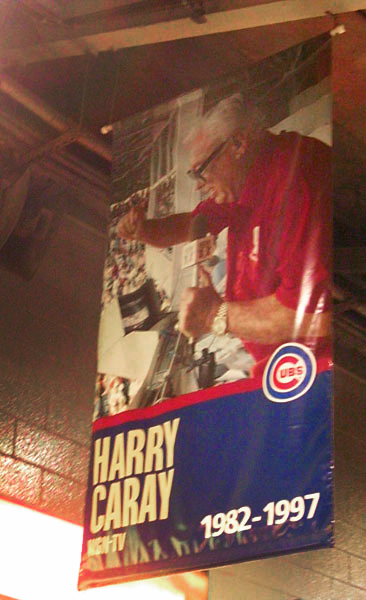
Harry Caray banner at Wrigley Field

Caray's funeral was held on February 27, 1998, at Holy Name Cathedral in Chicago. The Chicago community came out to pay respect to the Hall of Fame announcer, including Chicago Cubs players Sammy Sosa, Mark Grace, manager Jim Riggleman, and ex-players Ryne Sandberg, Rick Sutcliffe, and Billy Williams. Illinois Governor Jim Edgar, Mayor Richard Daley, and Chicago Bears coach Mike Ditka were also in attendance.

The organist of Holy Name Cathedral, Sal Soria, did not have any sheet music to play the song Caray made famous in the broadcast booth, "Take Me Out to the Ball Game", which resulted in him borrowing the music. He said in a Chicago Tribune article, "I had to sort of somber it up and slow it down to make it a little more classy. Actually, it was kind of fun to do it." Caray's wife, Dutchie, led the Wrigley Field crowd in singing the song at their first home game following Harry's death; this tradition has continued with a different person singing the song at each Cubs home game to this day.

Harry Caray is buried at All Saints Cemetery in Des Plaines, Illinois.

=== Legacy ===
Following his death, during the entire 1998 season the Cubs wore a patch on the sleeves of their uniforms depicting a caricature of Caray. Cubs slugger Sammy Sosa dedicated each of his 66 home runs that season to Caray.

Caray had five children, three with his first wife, Dorothy, and two with his second wife, Marian. He married his third wife Delores "Dutchie" (Goldmann) on May 19, 1975. His son Skip Caray followed him into the booth as a baseball broadcaster with the Atlanta Braves until his death on August 3, 2008. Caray's broadcasting legacy was extended to a third generation, as his grandson Chip Caray replaced Harry as the Cubs' play-by-play announcer from 1998 to 2004. Chip later returned to work with his father Skip on Atlanta Braves broadcasts, where he had worked for a while in the early 1990s. In 2022, Chip's twin sons Chris and Stefan became minor league baseball broadcasters each at 22, joining the Amarillo Sod Poodles, the Texas League affiliate of the Arizona Diamondbacks. Chip would eventually sign to be the St. Louis Cardinals announcer in 2023, when at the end of the season Chris and Stefan were given assignments for the Arizona Fall League. The following season, Chris joined the Oakland Athletics' sportscast.

In what Harry Caray said was one of his proudest moments, he worked some innings in the same broadcast booth with his son and grandson, during a Cubs/Braves game on May 13, 1991. On-air in a professional setting, the younger men would refer to their seniors by their first names. During 1998, Chip would refer to the departed Harry in third person as "Granddad", however he has now returned to referring to him as "Harry".

When the Cubs defeated the Cleveland Indians in seven games to win the 2016 World Series, Budweiser produced a celebratory commercial entitled "Harry Caray's Last Call" featuring a fictional version of what might have been Caray's call of the game, using archived footage stitched together.

== Honors and special events ==
The National Sportscasters and Sportswriters Association named Caray as Missouri Sportscaster of the Year twice (1959, 1960) and Illinois Sportscaster of the Year 10 times (1971–73, 75–78, 83–85), and inducted him into its NSSA Hall of Fame in 1988.

In 1989, the Baseball Hall of Fame presented Caray with the Ford C. Frick Award for "major contributions to baseball." That same year, he was inducted into the American Sportscasters Association Hall of Fame. He was also inducted into the National Radio Hall of Fame in 1990, and has his own star on the St. Louis Walk of Fame.

On June 24, 1994, the Chicago Cubs had a special day honoring Harry for 50 years of broadcasting Major League Baseball. Sponsored by the Cubs and Kemper Insurance, pins were given out to some unknown number of fans in attendance that day. The pins had a picture of Harry, with writing saying "HARRY CARAY, 50 YEARS BROADCASTING, Kemper MUTUAL FUNDS" and "HOLY COW."

In 1994, Caray was the radio inductee into the NAB Broadcasting Hall of Fame.

In 1999, a statue honoring Caray was erected outside of Wrigley Field, near the third base entrance at Sheffield Ave. and Addison St. It was relocated in 2010 to the corner of Sheffield and Waveland Avenues, just outside of the entrance to the stadium's bleachers.

Caray's style became fodder for pop culture parody as well, including a memorable Saturday Night Live recurring sketch featuring Caray (played by Will Ferrell) in various Weekend Update segments opposite Norm Macdonald and Colin Quinn. Caray would frequently abandon the topic he was supposed to be talking about and would drift into hypothetical topics like whether or not they would eat the moon if it were made of spare ribs and turning hot dogs into currency (20 hot dogs would equal roughly a nickel, depending on the strength of the yen). The sketch continued after Caray's death. When asked by SNL guest host Joan Allen about his death, Will Ferrell as Caray replied, "What's your point?" The Bob and Tom Show also had a Harry Caray parody show called "After Hours Sports", which eventually became "Afterlife Sports" after Caray's death, and the Heaven and Hell Baseball Game, in which Caray is the broadcast announcer for the games. On the Nickelodeon series Back at the Barnyard, news reporter Hilly Burford bears a strong resemblance to Caray, both in appearance and speech. In 2005, the cartoon Codename: Kids Next Door had two announcers reporting a baseball game. One was a parody of Caray, the other, Howard Cosell. The recurring character Reverend Fantastic from the animated television series Bordertown bears an uncanny likeness to Caray in both appearance and speaking style. Another Caray impersonation was done by Chicago radio personality Jim Volkman, heard most often on the Loop and AM1000.

Caray can be briefly heard in the 1986 film Ferris Bueller's Day Off, as a Cubs game is shown on a TV in a pizza parlor.

In 2008, a series of Chicago-area TV and radio ads for AT&T's Advanced TV featured comedian John Caponera impersonating the post-stroke version of Harry Caray. However, AT&T soon withdrew the spots following widespread criticism and a complaint by Caray's widow.

Atlanta Braves pitcher Will Ohman performed a Harry Caray impersonation when announcing the starting lineup for the Atlanta Braves during a Fox Game of the Week in 2008.

In 1988, Vess Beverage Inc. released and sold a Harry Caray signature soda, under the brand "Holy Cow", complete with his picture on every can.

== See also ==
- Chicago Cubs Hall of Fame
- List of people from Missouri

Preceded by Jack Brickhouse	Chicago Cubs Television Play-By-Play Announcer; 1982–1997	Succeeded by Chip Caray
