= Chris Caray =

American sports broadcaster (born 1999)

- Born: Harry Christopher Caray IV; November 8, 1999 (age 27)
- Education: University of Georgia
- Occupation: Sports broadcaster
- Family: Chip Caray (father); Josh Caray (uncle); Skip Caray (grandfather); Harry Caray (great-grandfather)

Harry Christopher Caray IV (born November 8, 1999) is an American sports broadcaster who is a television play-by-play announcer of the Athletics of Major League Baseball (MLB).

== Early life ==
Caray was born on November 8, 1999, and is 17 minutes older than his twin brother, Stefan. He is the son of Chip Caray, nephew of Josh Caray, the grandson of Skip Caray, and the great-grandson of Harry Caray. He grew up in Winter Park, Florida, until he moved to St. Augustine, Florida, in his junior year of high school.

== Career ==
Caray attended Valdosta State University for his freshman year and announced Valdosta State Blazers baseball games. He transferred to the University of Georgia for his sophomore year. After transferring, he called games for Georgia Gwinnett College.

In 2021, Chris and Stefan broadcast for the Cotuit Kettleers of the Cape Cod Baseball League. In 2022, they joined the Amarillo Sod Poodles of the Texas League as their broadcasters. The Caray brothers also announced in the Arizona Fall League after the 2023 regular season.

NBC Sports California announced that Caray will be a play-by-play announcer for Oakland Athletics telecasts during the 2024 season. Chris met dad Chip when the Cardinals played the Athletics in Oakland on April 15, 2024. Chris was broadcasting Athletics' games for NBC Sports California in his second big-league series, while Chip called the Cardinals games. Chris is in a play-by-play rotation with Jenny Cavnar who has the bulk of the games and is the first woman to be in a team's primary role.
