= Josh Caray =

American sportscaster

- Education: Oglethorpe University
- Occupation: Sports broadcaster
- Years active: 2004–present

Josh Caray is an American sportscaster who is currently the Director of Broadcasting and play-by-play broadcaster for the Rocket City Trash Pandas (AA-Angels) of Minor League Baseball. Caray also broadcasts for the University of Alabama and University of Alabama at Birmingham, calling women's basketball, baseball, softball, soccer, gymnastics and volleyball.

== Early life and education ==
Caray grew up in Atlanta, Georgia, a fan of the 1990s Atlanta Braves teams, watching alongside his father in Atlanta's TV and radio booths. He was a two-way lineman on Lovett School's football team. He then attended Guilford College in Greensboro, North Carolina, where he called their football games on the radio. He later transferred to Oglethorpe University in Brookhaven, Georgia, where he was on the track and field team and graduated in 2004.

== Career ==
Caray began his broadcast career in 2005, serving as a fill-in sports anchor at WGST-AM in Atlanta. He began his play-by-play career in 2007 when he became the voice of the Rome Braves for two seasons. One of his highlights was calling a Braves-Savannah Sand Gnats game with his father, as the elder Caray made a day trip to Rome to join his son on air in April 2007. A year later, he was on air in Hickory, North Carolina, for another Rome Braves game when he found out his dad had died. He called the final eight innings of that contest knowing his father had died. During this time he also called football games for the Rome High School Wolves.

He later became the television play-by-play announcer with the Atlanta Braves Class AAA affiliate, the Gwinnett Braves, where he was paired with Brian Jordan.

After a season in San Angelo, Texas, with an independent team, Caray called games for the Southern Maryland Blue Crabs of the Atlantic League in 2011. He also worked for IMG College during this time as a studio host, producer and board operator. He served in this role for two years, first for UNLV basketball in 2010-11, then football and basketball for Tulane in 2011-12.

During this time, Caray transitioned into news where he worked as an anchor, reporter, and assignment editor for All News 106.7 WYAY in Atlanta. He also oversaw the television partnership between All News and Fox 5 (WAGA-TV). Despite being on the All News roster, Caray worked out of the Fox 5 newsroom where he assisted in script-writing, assistant produced, and fronted stories on dozens of newscasts in his two and a half years there. Caray credits this as a turning point in his career as being on air daily allowed him to hone his skills and become more confident in his abilities.

After taking a TV news anchor position in Victoria, Texas,

In 2015, Caray returned to sports broadcasting when Long Island's Stony Brook University hired him as their football and men's basketball radio voice. In his four years at Stony Brook, Josh called two FCS playoff football teams and became the first member of his family to broadcast a men's NCAA Tournament game when the Seawolves faced Kentucky in March 2016.

At this time, Caray returned to baseball, calling the action for the Hudson Valley Renegades, the Short-Season A affiliate of the Rays from 2016-19 while also serving as the team's media relations director. He also freelanced for Holy Cross in Worcester, Massachusetts, and Yale University, calling baseball and softball games.

In 2019, the Rocket City Trash Pandas named Caray their Director of Broadcasting and play-by-play broadcaster. Caray also works as a freelancer for the University of Alabama on their SEC TV+ platform calling Crimson Tide baseball, soccer, volleyball and gymnastics. He also freelances for University of Alabama at Birmingham (UAB), calling women's basketball, softball and baseball for the Blazers.

== Family ==
Caray is the grandson of Hall of Fame baseball broadcaster Harry Caray, son of Atlanta Braves Hall of Famer broadcaster Skip Caray, and the half-brother of current Cardinals TV voice Chip Caray.

He also has two nephews, Chris and Stefan, who are calling games for the Amarillo Sod Poodles (AA-Diamondbacks) in Texas. Chris was named a TV Play-by-Play announcer for the A's in 2024.

== Sources ==
- The Caray family gets a fourth generation of pro baseball broadcasters
- Renegades radio man Josh Caray is of baseball broadcast royalty
- The Tragic Death of Skip Caray Shocked the Atlanta Braves Community
- Better Know A Broadcaster: Josh Caray
- One-on-One with Josh Caray
- Paula Caray, wife of longtime Braves broadcaster Skip Caray, dies
- Josh Caray remembers father Skip Caray, play-by-play announcer for the Atlanta Braves
- Caray twins put fourth generation of family in baseball broadcast booth
- Behind the Scenes with Trash Pandas Broadcaster Josh Caray
