= Skip Caray =

American sportscaster (1939–2008)

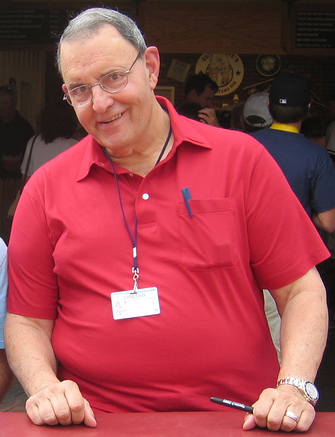
- Born: Harry Christopher Caray Jr. August 12, 1939; St. Louis, Missouri, U.S.
- Died: August 3, 2008 (aged 68); Rutledge, Georgia, U.S.
- Occupation: Sportscaster
- Years active: 1967–2008
- Spouse: Paula Caray (m. 1976)
- Children: Chip, Cindy, Shayelyn, and Josh Caray
- Parent: Harry Caray

Harry Christopher "Skip" Caray Jr. (August 12, 1939 – August 3, 2008) was an American sportscaster, best known for his long career as a radio and television play-by-play announcer for the Atlanta Braves of Major League Baseball. He was the son of baseball announcer Harry Caray, and the father of St. Louis Cardinals play-by-play announcer and former fellow Braves broadcaster Chip Caray; another son, Josh Caray, is the play-by-play announcer for the minor league Rocket City Trash Pandas.

== Early life and education ==
Skip Caray grew up in baseball as the son of Hall of Fame broadcaster Harry Caray, who would routinely refer to his son at 8:30 p.m. during every broadcast by saying, "Good night, Skippy", a phrase for which the younger Caray was teased throughout his adolescence.

He studied television and radio at the University of Missouri where he received a degree in journalism, and was a member of Phi Gamma Delta. He began his career in St. Louis calling Saint Louis University and St. Louis Hawks basketball games. In 1968, Caray moved with the Hawks to Atlanta, where he also called Atlanta Flames hockey games and did morning sportscasts on WSB-AM.

== Career ==
=== Atlanta Braves ===
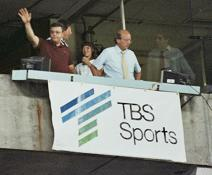
Skip Caray and Pete Van Wieren acknowledging fans at a game in 1983.

In 1976, Caray was added to the broadcast team for the Braves, a position he held until his death. In September 2007, he was not asked to announce League Division Series games on TBS, and was kept exclusive to the Braves as the team's broadcasts moved to local Atlanta station WPCH-TV (Peachtree TV, a direct descendant of the original WTBS). Caray felt slighted by the move.

Perhaps Caray's most memorable call was his description of Francisco Cabrera's game-winning hit in Game 7 of the 1992 National League Championship Series against the Pittsburgh Pirates. The game itself was ultimately decided on Braves first-baseman Sid Bream beating out Pirates left-fielder Barry Bonds' throw to home plate.

Swung, line drive, left field! One run is in! Here comes Bream! Here’s the throw to the plate! He is...SAFE! BRAVES WIN! BRAVES WIN! BRAVES WIN! BRAVES WIN! Braves win!

Three years later, the Braves defeated the Cleveland Indians in Game 6 of the 1995 World Series to earn the city of Atlanta its first major professional sports championship. Caray called Marquis Grissom catching the final out in center field.

Swung, fly ball, deep left-center. Grissom on the run ... YES! YES! YES! The Atlanta Braves have given you a championship!

According to The Atlanta Journal-Constitution, Caray's calls of the 1992 pennant win and 1995 World Series win were "the two most iconic calls" in Braves history.

Caray was inducted into the Atlanta Braves Hall of Fame in 2004 alongside long-time Braves broadcaster Pete Van Wieren. He has been recognized with six Georgia Sportscaster-of-the Year awards from the National Sportswriters and Sportscasters Association, as well as a Georgia-area Emmy award.

On December 18, 2006, the Braves organization announced that Caray (and partner Van Wieren) had signed three-year contracts to continue doing Braves game broadcasts on their radio network. However, Caray only announced ten games on TBS in the 2007 season before being relegated to Peachtree TV.

On the final broadcast of Braves TBS Baseball (September 30, 2007), Caray thanked fans saying, "To all you people who have watched the Braves for these 30 years ... thank you. We appreciate you more than you will ever know. ... Thank you folks and God bless you. And we're going to miss you every bit as much as you miss us."

=== NBC Sports ===
In 2000, NBC hired Caray to do play-by-play with Joe Morgan on the AL Division Series between the New York Yankees and Oakland Athletics. Caray was filling in for Bob Costas, who sat out the Division Series after anchoring NBC's prime time coverage of the Summer Olympic Games from Sydney, Australia.

=== Other appearances ===
On December 11, 1982, Caray along with Abe Lemons called the much hyped college basketball contest between Virginia and Georgetown (led by Ralph Sampson and Patrick Ewing respectively) for TBS. Caray also called play-by-play for the first two seasons (1990–91) of the TNT network's Sunday night NFL coverage as well as TBS' coverage of the NBA and college football, and anchored TBS' coverage of the 1990 Goodwill Games. He made his motion picture debut in the 1985 movie The Slugger's Wife, starring Michael O'Keefe, Randy Quaid and Rebecca De Mornay. Caray frequently mocked his participation in the film on-air and referred to it as one of the worst movies ever made, often saying that the actors in the movie probably watched it as the in-flight movie on their way back to Los Angeles. Caray was also the lead play-by-play man for The Baseball Network's (a joint venture of ABC and NBC Sports respectively) regional coverage of Braves games during that ill-fated experiment's two seasons (1994 and 1995) usually alongside the opposing team's secondary play-by-play man or color commentator.

== Broadcasting style ==
Caray's broadcasts were characterized by his witty and sarcastic sense of humor, a personality trait that endeared him to most fans, but alienated him from some. For example, during a particularly long losing streak in the 1980s, Caray declared at the start of a game against the Pittsburgh Pirates, "And, like lambs to the slaughter, the Braves take the field". Other frequent targets of Caray's jokes included the Montreal Expos' mascot Youppi, New York Mets fans, professional wrestling, The Wave, TBS baseball broadcast producer Glenn Diamond, and the post game B-movie frequently shown on TBS during the 1980s. In one instance, in order to get back at Atlanta Journal-Constitution columnist Ron Hudspeth for a critical column, Caray paid to have an airplane tow a banner above Atlanta–Fulton County Stadium during a Braves game which read, "For a good time, call Rona Hudspeth", and included Ron's actual phone number.

Among other memorable lines, Caray said of Braves pitcher Charlie Kerfeld, who was 6'4" and 245 lbs., "Boy, he is big enough to go to work." And during a losing streak, after talking about a promotion in which Braves fans could come on the field and meet the players, Caray commented, "The way things are going, we may make the fans go through a metal detector on the way to the field."

Caray was also known for his tendency to identify the hometowns of fans who catch foul balls during Braves games in jest. Fans who reside in the metro Atlanta area were identified by a random suburb, though there was no legitimacy behind these references. Similarly, when daytime home games went long, Caray would routinely give a "traffic report" at exactly 5 o'clock on radio broadcasts. It consisted of his rattling off a random list of major Atlanta arteries, and describing each one as hopelessly backed up. When the Braves suffered a severely bad outing, and the score was strongly lopsided in favor of the other team, in late innings he would often tell fans "It's OK to walk the dog now, folks, if you promise to support our sponsors."

In addition to his play-by-play duties, Caray also hosted a pre-game call-in show on WSB until 2004.

== Criticism ==
In June 2000, Caray, along with fellow Braves broadcasters Joe Simpson, Pete Van Wieren and Don Sutton, were banned from Atlanta Braves team charter flights for several games after criticizing Braves catcher Javy López for being penalized for setting up outside the catchers box during a game against the Milwaukee Brewers.

In an attempt to combat criticism of Caray's on-air "home team" bias and to market its baseball coverage to non-Braves fans, during the 2003 season, TBS removed him and Pete Van Wieren from announcing Braves games on television. The move was strongly criticized by Braves fans, the local Atlanta media, and Braves manager Bobby Cox. Over 90% of Braves fans who voted in an online poll conducted by the Atlanta Journal-Constitution preferred Caray and Van Wieren to the more neutral broadcasts. The move backfired, and ratings for the TBS broadcasts declined sharply. After the All-Star Break, Caray and Van Wieren were returned to the booth. They were taken off permanently in 2007 with TBS hiring new broadcasters for their national playoff coverage under contract with the league later in the year.

== Death ==
On August 3, 2008, the Atlanta Braves announced that Caray had died at the age of 68. His wife, Paula, reported to The Atlanta Journal-Constitution that on Sunday afternoon when she thought her husband was napping, she looked out the window and saw a bird feeder not hanging where it should be and thought it had been blown down by the wind. When she stood up, she noticed her husband lying on the ground next to the bird feeder. He had been suffering from failing health for nearly a year prior, but returned to work for the 2008 season, calling a game on radio as recently as three days before his death. Tributes to Caray were given on all of the Atlanta television stations that evening and on WGST-AM the next morning.

Shortly after Caray's death, the Atlanta Braves began wearing a memorial patch on their uniforms that read "SKIP", which appeared on the sleeve opposite the "BEACH" patch honoring Jim Beauchamp that they had been wearing since the beginning of the 2008 season.
