= Jenny Cavnar =

American sports broadcaster

- Born: July 16, 1982 (age 43); Aurora, Colorado, U.S.
- Education: Colorado State University
- Occupation: Sports commentator
- Years active: 2007–present
- Spouse: Steve Spurgeon
- Children: 2

Jenny Cavnar (born July 16, 1982) is an American sports broadcaster who is the television play-by-play announcer of the Athletics of Major League Baseball (MLB). She is the first female primary play-by-play announcer in MLB history. Cavnar also does play-by-play for men's and women's college basketball on Fox Sports 1 and the Pac-12 Network.

== Early life ==
Cavnar is from Aurora, Colorado. Her father, Steve, won the high school baseball state championship when he was a student at Smoky Hill High School and also coached the baseball team for Smoky Hill and Regis Jesuit High School.

Cavnar also attended Smoky Hill High School. While she was in her junior year, she became inspired to become a sports reporter by watching Melissa Stark on Monday Night Football. She attended Colorado State University, where she majored in business and communications and graduated in 2004. Cavnar played club lacrosse at Colorado State. During her college tenure, she interned at the University of Kentucky in their media relations department.

== Career ==
After graduating from Colorado State, Cavnar worked for WJRT-TV in Flint, Michigan, where she covered high school and college sports. She also served as an assistant coach for the University of California, Los Angeles's club lacrosse team. In 2007, Channel 4 San Diego hired Cavnar for their pregame and postgame shows for the San Diego Padres of Major League Baseball (MLB). In 2012, she succeeded Alanna Rizzo as host of the pregame and postgame television shows for the Colorado Rockies on AT&T SportsNet Rocky Mountain.

Cavnar became the first woman to provide color commentary for a National League baseball game on the radio for KOA on July 2, 2015. In 2018, she filled in as the play-by-play announcer for two Rockies games, the first woman to do so since 1993. Cavnar has also served on the broadcast team for both men's and women's college basketball games on the Pac 12 Network and Fox Sports 1.

In 2021, Cavnar won the Colorado Sportscaster of the Year Award from the National Sports Media Association. She has also won five Emmy Awards.

On February 13, 2024, NBC Sports California announced that Cavnar would be their lead play-by-play announcer for Oakland Athletics telecasts starting in the 2024 season, making her the first woman to be a primary play-by-play announcer for a team in MLB history. Chris Caray was chosen for a play-by-play rotation with Cavnar. On May 13, in a game between the Athletics and the Houston Astros, Cavnar and Julia Morales became the first two women to do the play-by-play on television for the same Major League Baseball game.

== Personal life ==
Cavnar's husband, Steve Spurgeon, played baseball for the Chicago White Sox organization. He is a member of the Denver Fire Department. They have two children.
