= Bay City Town Center =

Shopping mall in Bangor Township, Bay County, Michigan, United States

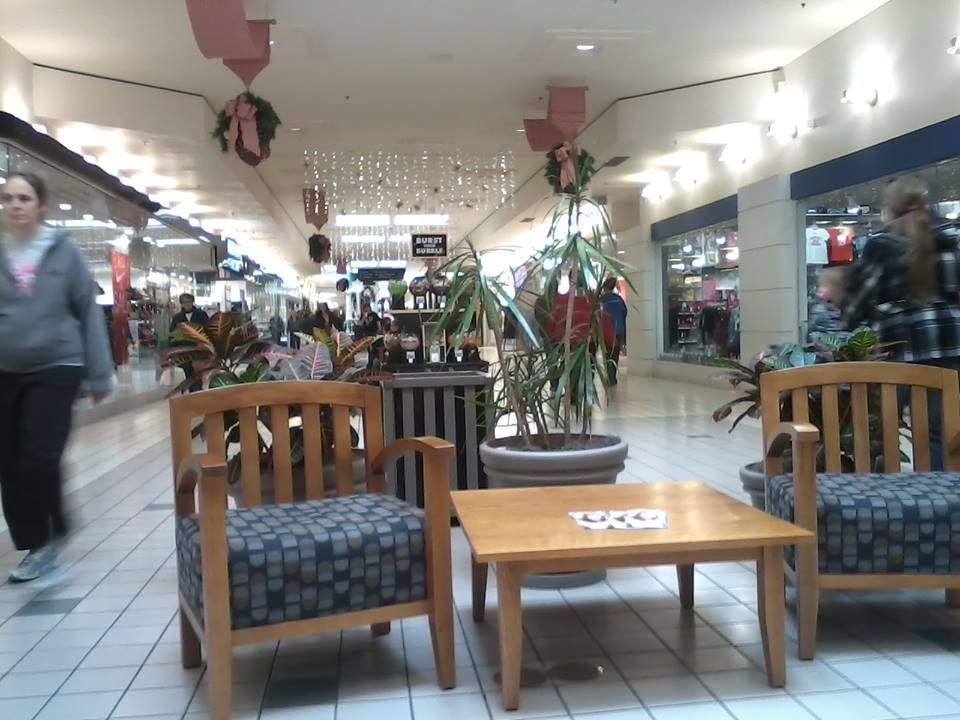
- The mall's Target wing in 2013
- Location: Bangor Township, Bay County, Michigan
- Coordinates: 43.627°N 83.891°W
- Address: 4101 East Wilder Road
- Opened: 1991
- Previous names: Bay City Mall
- Developer: Homart Development Company and Robert B. Aikens
- Owner: Lormax Stern
- Architect: Wah Yee Associates
- Num. of stores: 50+
- Num. of anchor tenants: 7 (4 open, 3 vacant)
- Floor area: 530,000 square feet (49,000 m^{2}) (GLA)
- Floors: 1
- Public transit: Bay Metro

Bay City Town Center, formerly Bay City Mall, is an enclosed shopping mall in Bangor Township, Bay County, just outside the city of Bay City, Michigan, United States. Its anchor stores are Dunham's Sports, Hobby Lobby, Marshalls, Ollie's Bargain Outlet, PetSmart, and Planet Fitness, with vacancies previously occupied by JCPenney and Target. Another tenant is a ten-screen movie theater owned by Goodrich Quality Theaters. Opened in 1991, the mall originally featured Target, Sears, and Prange's, which was converted to Younkers a year after opening. A later expansion added JCPenney, which moved from Hampton Square Mall in nearby Hampton Township. Bay City Mall was developed by Robert B. Aikens and Homart Development Company, the former real estate division of Sears.

The mall underwent a number of store closures and changes in the 2010s, beginning with the simultaneous closures of Sears and Target in 2014. Sears was divided between Ollie's Bargain Outlet and a furniture store operated by Younkers. After Younkers' parent company went out of business, the former furniture store became Dunham's Sports, which relocated from elsewhere in the mall. The property was renamed Bay City Town Center in 2018 and number of big-box stores joined. Bay City Town Center is owned and managed by Lormax Stern.

== History ==
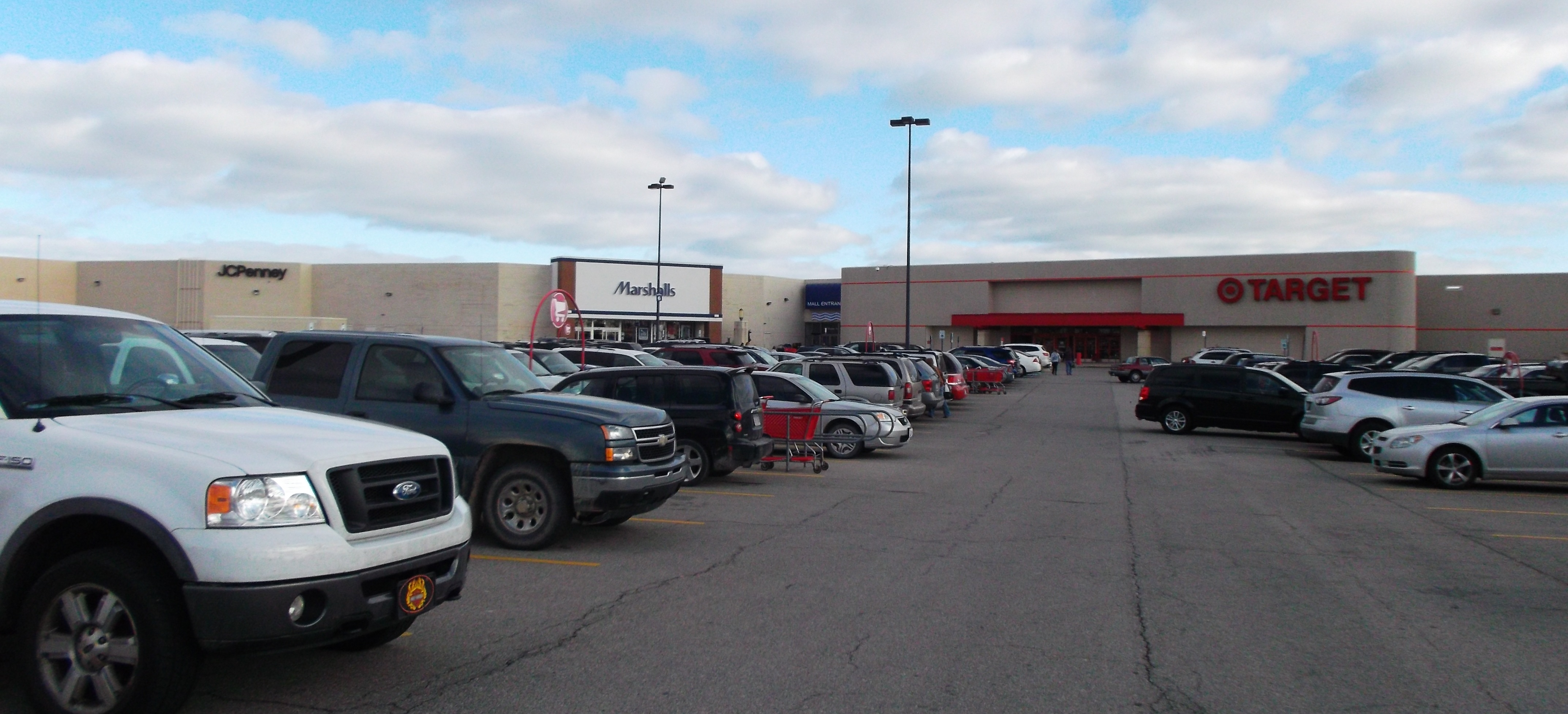
The south entrance in 2013, showing Marshalls and Target

Robert B. Aikens and Associates, a real estate company based in Troy, Michigan, first announced plans for Bay City Mall in July 1989. Initially, the company wanted to build a strip mall at a site on Wilder Road in Bangor Township, to the north side of Bay City, Michigan. Aikens underwent negotiations with a number of department store chains, including Sears. At the time, Sears had a store in downtown Bay City which they were seeking to expand or relocate. Previously, Aikens had wanted to build a shopping center adjacent to the existing Sears, or assist the chain in relocating to an expansion of Hampton Square Mall in nearby Hampton Township, but both of these plans were rejected due to environmental concerns. Aikens ultimately decided to change the planned strip mall on Wilder Road to an enclosed property after noting that Sears and other retailers who saw Bay City as a potential market for expansion preferred to open in enclosed malls over strip malls or stores located downtown.

By the time Robert B. Aikens and Associates had selected a site for the proposed mall in July 1989, the firm was also undergoing negotiations with Target and Prange's as additional anchor stores. Due to the initial interest of Sears in the project, that company assisted in development through Homart Development Company, a former subsidiary with which Sears developed shopping centers. The two companies' plans called for an approximately 675,000-square-foot (62,700 m^{2}) shopping mall with a movie theater and food court, and space for up to 90 tenants. Aikens thought the site of the mall was easily accessible from nearby highways, and would be convenient to shoppers in Arenac, Ogemaw, and Iosco counties, all located to the north of Bay City. He also thought the mall's larger size than Hampton Square would make it competitive with Fashion Square Mall in nearby Saginaw. The announcement of Sears's impending relocation created concerns among city officials and business owners, especially after JCPenney had vacated their downtown store in favor of one at Hampton Square Mall. Ground breaking began in October 1989 with a targeted opening date of late 1991. Building costs were estimated at $28,000,000, of which about $4,000,000 was financed through bonds sold by the township. Also as part of the proposal, Wilder Road underwent By the end of 1990, both Sears and Target had opened.

=== Late 1990s–early 2000s: After opening ===
The mall held a soft opening in April 1991, by which point about 26 of the stores were open. By year's end, the number had increased to 39, and the mall was fully opened.

In 2005, the mall received media attention when Bryan Johnson, who was costumed as the Easter Bunny during an Easter event at the mall, was attacked by a 12-year-old customer. Old Navy opened a store at the mall in 2007.

Several tenants at Bay City Mall closed in the first decade of the 21st century, including a B. Dalton bookstore and a classroom maintained by Bay-Arenac Intermediate School District, which had been at the mall since 1995. A Ruby Tuesday restaurant across from the mall also closed in 2009. These closures led to rumors that further stores, or the mall itself, might close. In 2010, the mall owners at the time, General Growth Properties, listed Bay City Mall among its least profitable malls, and announced plans to place it and eleven other malls under management of a new company. In February 2010, ownership of the mall was turned over to a trust of unidentified lenders, who hired Cushman & Wakefield Inc. to oversee the mall. These new owners have planned a $200,000 renovation of the mall property, including a new sign on Wilder Road. Old Navy closed in mid-2012. Planet Fitness opened in October of the same year.

=== 2010s–2020s: Closure of Target and Sears, change to Bay City Town Center ===
Cushman & Wakefield sold the mall in April 2013 to Lormax Stern. Marshalls and rue21 both joined in late 2013. The movie theater complex was expanded in 2014, adding two new auditoriums with stadium seating for a total of ten screens.

Sears announced that the closure of its store at Bay City Mall store would begin on October 31, 2014. Sears has operated a store in Bay City since at least 1928. Target announced one month later that its store at Bay City Mall would close in 2015.

In 2016, Younkers announced the opening of a home and furniture store in half of the former Sears. Mall owners announced in May 2017 that the mall's food court would be removed for a PetSmart, while Ollie's Bargain Outlet would open in the other half of the vacated Sears. The mall was renamed from Bay City Mall to Bay City Town Center in August 2017.

On August 18, 2018, it was announced a farming supply store called Big R (now known as Stock + Field) would be replacing the former Target. However, these plans were canceled. Later in the month, both Younkers stores closed due to Bon-Ton Stores filing for bankruptcy. Dunham's Sports, which operated a store in the Target wing, moved to the former Younkers Furniture location in September 2019.

On June 23, 2020, JCPenney announced that it would be closing as part of a plan to close 13 stores nationwide. The store closed in October 2020. Hobby Lobby opened a store at the mall in 2025.
