= Cheyenne Nesbitt =

American heptathlete (born 1999)

- Nesbitt in 2024

Personal information
- Born: 23 August 1999 (27 years, 82 days old)
- Education: Garber High School; Saginaw Valley State University
- Height: 173 cm (5 ft 8 in)
- Weight: 59 kg (130 lb)

Sport
- Country: United States
- Sport: Sport of athletics
- Events: Heptathlon; Women's pentathlon
- College team: Saginaw Valley State Cardinals
- Coached by: Rod Cowan
- Now coaching: Illinois Fighting Illini

Achievements and titles
- National finals: 2022 USA Champs; • Heptathlon, 8th; 2023 USA Indoors; • Pentathlon, 7th; 2023 USA Champs; • Heptathlon, 13th; 2024 USA Indoors; • Pentathlon, 1st (gold); 2024 USA Champs; • Heptathlon, 11th
- Personal bests: 60mH: 8.29 i (2024); 100mH: 13.09 (+1.6) (2024); 800m: 2:16.32 (2024); LJ: 6.35m i (2021); HJ: 1.84m (2024); SP: 13.72m (2024); PENT: 4475pts (2024); HEP: 6002pts (2024)
- Updated on December 2024

Cheyenne Nesbitt (née Williamson; born 23 August 1999) is an American heptathlete and the 2024 USA Indoor Track and Field Championships winner in the women's pentathlon. Competing for the Saginaw Valley State Cardinals track and field team, Nesbitt was a ten-time NCAA Division II champion including four straight heptathlon titles. At the 2024 United States Olympic trials heptathlon, Nesbitt was in 4th place after the first day of competition but ended up finishing 11th.

== Career ==
Cheyenne Nesbitt's NCAA Division II titles
| Year | Event |
|---|---|
| 2021 Indoor | Long jump |
| 2021 Indoor | 60 m hurdles |
| 2021 Indoor | Pentathlon |
| 2021 Outdoor | Heptathlon |
| 2021 Outdoor | 4 × 400 m relay |
| 2021 Outdoor | Long jump |
| 2022 Indoor | Pentathlon |
| 2022 Outdoor | Heptathlon |
| 2023 Outdoor | Heptathlon |
| 2023 Outdoor | High jump |
| 2024 Outdoor | Heptathlon |

In high school, Nesbitt broke a 20-year-old school long jump record during her first ever competition. She committed to the Saginaw Valley State Cardinals track and field team to compete in the NCAA Division II.

While playing basketball, Nesbitt tore her anterior cruciate ligament during her senior year of high school, causing her to miss the 2018 prep season. In 2019, still injured, Nesbitt used a medical redshirt, and in 2020 she was given an extra year of eligibility due to the COVID-19 pandemic. Because of this, she was able to continue competing collegiately until 2024 at the age of 24.

Nesbitt was a 10-time NCAA DII indoor or DII outdoor champion in several different events. She was the first ever NCAA athlete in any division to win four national heptathlon titles in a row.

Nesbitt won her first senior national title at the 2024 USA Indoor Track and Field Championships, beating Olympian Annie Kunz and Hope Bender in the process. She became the first-ever collegian to win a USATF indoor heptathlon title, and her mark of 4,475 points was a new NCAA Division II record and the 2nd-highest score in the world that year. Despite winning the U.S. championships, Nesbitt's mark ended up below the top-five threshold of 4,533 points required to compete at the 2024 World Indoor Championships.

At the 2024 United States Olympic trials, Nesbitt finished 3rd in the heptathlon high jump and was in 4th place overall after the first day of competition. On the final day, she finished 14th in the long jump and 13th in the javelin disciplines, and placed 11th after all heptathlon events were completed, failing to qualify for the U.S. Olympic team.

== Personal life ==
Nesbitt was born on 23 August 1999 and attended Garber High School in Bay City, Michigan. She started running from her Hampton Elementary return bus stop to her grandmother's house in grade school, and first started track and field at Cramer Junior High.

In 2023, Nesbitt married Saginaw track and field teammate Brendan Nesbitt and changed her last name from Williamson.

In 2024, Nesbitt became an assistant coach for the Illinois Fighting Illini track and field program.

== Statistics ==
=== Personal best progression ===
Heptathlon progression
| # | Mark | Pl. | Competition | Venue | Date | Ref. |
|---|---|---|---|---|---|---|
| 1 | 5517 pts | 3rd place, bronze medalist(s) | Tobacco Road Challenge | Durham, NC | 9 Apr 2021 | |
| 2 | 5595 pts | 1st place, gold medalist(s) | NCAA Division II Outdoor Track & Field Championships | Allendale, MI | 27 May 2021 | |
| 3 | 5757 pts | 1st place, gold medalist(s) | NCAA Division II Outdoor Track & Field Championships | Allendale, MI | 26 May 2022 | |
| 4 | 5861 pts | 1st place, gold medalist(s) | NCAA Division II Outdoor Track & Field Championships | Pueblo, CO | 25 May 2023 | |
| 5 | 6002 pts | 1st place, gold medalist(s) | NCAA Division II Outdoor Track & Field Championships | Emporia, KS | 23 May 2024 | |

Pentathlon progression
| # | Mark | Pl. | Competition | Venue | Date | Ref. |
|---|---|---|---|---|---|---|
| 1 | 3630 pts | 2nd place, silver medalist(s) | SVSU Holiday Open & Multis | Saginaw, MI | 6 Dec 2019 | |
| 2 | 3906 pts OT | 1st place, gold medalist(s) | SVSU - Jet's Pizza Invitational | Saginaw, MI | 28 Jan 2021 | |
| 3 | 4113 pts | 1st place, gold medalist(s) | NCAA Division II Indoor Track & Field Championships | Birmingham, AL | 10 Mar 2021 | |
| 4 | 4292 pts OT | 1st place, gold medalist(s) | NCAA Division II Indoor Championships | Pittsburg, KS | 10 Mar 2022 | |
| 5 | 4475 pts | 1st place, gold medalist(s) | USA Indoor Track and Field Championships | Indianapolis, IN | 27 Jan 2024 | |
