= Hampton Towne Centre =

Defunct mall in Essexville, Hampton Township, Bay County, Michigan, U.S.

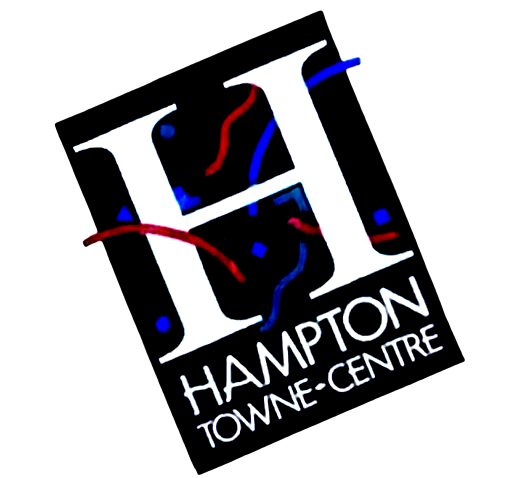

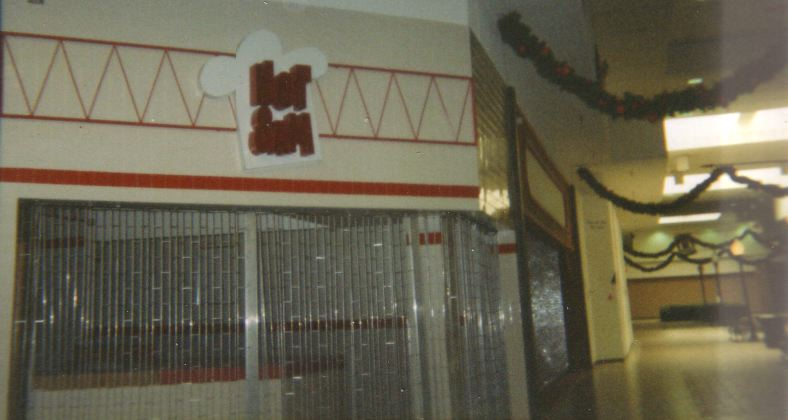
- The mall's interior in 2003, looking west toward the former Wiechmann's store
- Location: Essexville, Michigan, U.S.
- Coordinates: 43.5927°N 83.8343°W
- Address: 1465 West Center Road
- Opened: November 12, 1975
- Closed: September 15, 2010
- Previous names: Hampton Square Mall
- Developer: Ramco-Gershenson Properties Trust
- Architect: Wah Yee Associates
- Num. of stores: 37
- Num. of anchor tenants: 4
- Floor area: 350,000 square feet (33,000 m^{2})
- Floors: 1

Hampton Towne Centre, formerly Hampton Square Mall, was an enclosed shopping mall in Hampton Township, Michigan, just outside the city of Essexville, Michigan, United States. The mall opened on November 12, 1975. The property featured Kmart and Wiechmann's as its anchor stores, with an A&P supermarket opening in 1977 and JCPenney in 1989. A number of factors caused the mall's decline in the 1990s and onward, including the relocation of JCPenney to Bay City Mall (now Bay City Town Center), and the closures of A&P, Wiechmann's, and Kmart. The building, vacant except for a thrift store, an intermediate school district, and a Michigan Department of Human Services office, was last owned by Art Dore until his death in 2022.

== History ==
Ramco-Gershenson Properties (now RPT Realty), a real estate developer based in Farmington Hills, Michigan, announced plans for Hampton Square Mall in August 1973. These plans called for a 300,000-square-foot (28,000 m^{2}), enclosed shopping mall to be located at the southeast corner of Center Road (M-25) and Pine Road. The location, in Hampton Township east of Essexville, Michigan, would also serve Bay City, Michigan. Kmart was confirmed as the first anchor store in mid-1973, with plans also calling for a supermarket and about 50 other stores. Wah Yee of Southfield, Michigan served as the center's architect. Groundbreaking for the mall started in September 1973, beginning at the mall's eastern end. By year's end, the building which would house Kmart was near completion, and Ramco representatives announced they would begin undergoing negotiations for a second department store to become the anchor store at the western end.

Although Ramco initially planned for the mall to be open by late 1974, construction was delayed until early 1975 due to a delay of shipment in steel caused by a labor strike. The company noted at the time that all but five of the mall's spaces had been leased to tenants, but did not state who any of them were; they also confirmed that Kmart was still slated to open by September 1974. In January 1975, Kinney Shoes confirmed it would close a store in downtown Bay City in favor of a location at Hampton Square. Wiechmann's, a department store based in nearby Saginaw, announced a month later that they would open a store as the mall's western anchor. The store's president, William Kessel, stated that the company chose to locate at Hampton Square Mall due to the success of the firm's other mall-based store at Fashion Square Mall in Saginaw; he also thought opening a store in Essexville would attract customers from the Thumb, a region of Michigan east of Bay City. The store measured about 40,000 square feet (3,700 m^{2}) in size. Due to delays on construction of the Wiechmann's store, the mall itself was further delayed in opening until November 1975. Two months before opening, The Bay City Times reported that other stores in the mall would include Camelot Music, Circus World, an Aladdin's Castle arcade, several local clothing stores, and a Hot Sam pretzel shop. The mall opened on November 12, 1975 with a ribbon-cutting ceremony, attended by representatives of Ramco-Gershenson and the township's municipal clerk.

=== 1976–1990: After opening ===
Ramco-Gershenson's then-executive vice president Michael A. Ward reported in July 1976 that the mall was 91 percent occupied, with new stores at the time including Zales, B. Dalton, and Hallmark. Ward also stated that the company was looking to accommodate space to the west of Wiechmann's for a third major retailer. This space was confirmed in mid-1977 to be the location of a new A&P supermarket, replacing an existing store elsewhere in Essexville. This was part of a move by the chain to build bigger and more modern stores after a period of closing smaller ones.

A number of store changes ensued in 1981. The mall bought out the leases of Gantos clothing store and an adjacent vitamin shop called State Vitamin, and combined both spaces into a Perry Drug pharmacy. Ward claimed that this was done because market analysis performed by Ramco-Gershenson determined that the mall had too many women's clothing stores and too few stores which offered health and beauty products. In conjunction with Perry Drug, other stores opening at the mall in 1981 included GNC, RadioShack, and Volume Shoes (now known as Payless). Also in 1981, a customer was charged for murdering his wife while she was working at the Lerner New York store in the mall. In 1984, Ramco-Gershenson transferred ownership of the mall to CPR Hampton Associates, an association based in California, although Ramco-Gershenson continued to serve as manager.

Two tenants, Bintz Sporting Goods and Detroit-based clothing chain Winkelman's, both closed at the mall in 1985. The Bintz store was closed due to declining business; additionally, Ramco-Gershenson had filed a $25,000 lawsuit against the store's owners due to allegations of unpaid rent. Meanwhile, the owners of the Winkelman's chain did not confirm at the time why the Hampton Square store was closed. Hampton Square's management changed in 1986 when Ramco-Gershenson selected Jeffrey A. Hochberger as the mall's new manager, taking over the role from original manager Helen Fleming. Prior to joining the mall, Hochberger had managed Universal Mall in the Detroit suburb of Warren. He stated that his plans for managing the mall included new landscaping and advertising.

=== Late 1980s–early 1990s: JCPenney and decline ===
The Bay City Times reported in January 1988 that Ramco-Gershenson was seeking to expand the mall by adding a wing to the mall's north side, to be anchored by a JCPenney store. This store would replace a location in downtown Bay City that had operated since 1959. At the time, neither Hochberger nor the manager of the downtown JCPenney store had confirmed the relocation. The mall had undergone a decline in tenancy following economic downturns in the United States, which included closure of the Thom McAn shoe store. Despite this, the manager of Town & Country clothing store reported a significant increase in sales, and other merchants thought the addition of a third anchor store would help revitalize the mall. By July 1988, JCPenney confirmed it would open a 32,000-square-foot (3,000 m^{2}) store at the mall and close the downtown one. Additionally, MC Sports opened at the mall in this time span. Representatives of both chains confirmed their decisions to locate in Hampton Square were to provide retailers more convenient to the Thumb. By 1990, the addition of JCPenney had increased the size of the mall to 350,000 square feet (33,000 m^{2}).

Three stores closed at the mall in early 1991, one of which was MC Sports. The other two were KB Toys (which had acquired Circus World a year prior) and Carter's, a local women's clothing store which was an original tenant. Three months later, the Bay City area's second mall, Bay City Mall (now Bay City Town Center), opened in Bangor Township. Robert B. Aikens and Associates, the company which developed Bay City Mall, expressed interest in convincing JCPenney to relocate from Hampton Square. Shortly after Bay City Mall opened, Zales and GNC both closed their Hampton Square stores in favor of locations at the newer mall. CPR Hampton Associates filed for Chapter 11 bankruptcy in November 1991, after owing over $10,000 each to Ramco-Gershenson and Consumers Energy. The relocation of JCPenney and closure of Wiechmann's soon afterward created a further decline in tenancy throughout the first half of the 1990s, although at the time, Kmart remained open, and a McDonald's opened at the mall in 1994. Additionally, the complex was renamed Hampton Towne Centre.

=== 2000–2010: Closure of Kmart ===
Kmart closed at the mall in 2002, creating further vacancy at the mall. This marked a move toward an increased focus on office tenants, with very few retail tenants remaining other than Mandarin House, a Chinese restaurant. The mall ultimately closed in September 2010. Mandarin House Chinese moved to a new location.

Local business owner Art Dore purchased the mall in August 2011 and announced plans to reopen it as a mixed-use property featuring offices and retail. At the time of his purchase, the mall was vacant except for three businesses: Michigan Department of Human Services, Bay-Arenac Intermediate School District, and a thrift store called Cat's Meow. Dore announced in 2017 a financial incentive for any prospective businesses within the mall. However, the mall never reopened, and Dore died in November 2022.
