= Steve Phillips =

American baseball analyst and former baseball executive (born 1963)

- Born: May 18, 1963 (age 63); Detroit, Michigan, U.S.
- Education: University of Michigan
- Occupations: Baseball analyst, executive
- Years active: 1990–present
- Employer(s): SIRIUS XM Radio (current); Fanhouse.com (current); ESPN (prior); New York Mets (prior)
- Known for: General manager of the New York Mets, baseball analyst
- Spouse: Kathleen Phillips

Stephen Francis Phillips (born May 18, 1963) is an American baseball analyst and former baseball executive. He served as the general manager of the New York Mets from 1997 through 2003. He worked as a baseball analyst for ESPN from 2005 until his dismissal in October 2009. He currently serves as an MLB analyst on TSN and TSN 1050 radio as well as the host of The Leadoff Spot on SiriusXM's MLB Network Radio.

== Early life ==
Phillips was offered a football scholarship to Northwestern University after high school. He signed a letter of intent, but opted instead to sign a professional baseball contract after being drafted by the New York Mets. Phillips attended De La Salle Collegiate High School in Detroit, Michigan, and later earned a psychology degree from the University of Michigan during baseball's off-seasons.

== Playing career ==
Phillips was drafted by the New York Mets in the 1981 amateur draft. From 1981 to 1987, he played for six different minor league teams in the Mets and Detroit Tigers organizations. Playing mainly as a second baseman and shortstop, Phillips batted .250 with 22 home runs and 215 RBIs in 618 games.

== New York Mets executive ==
Phillips joined the Mets' front office in 1990. He was named director of minor league operations on October 2, 1991, and was promoted first to assistant general manager on December 4, 1995, then general manager on July 16, 1997. He was fired by chief executive officer Fred Wilpon on June 12, 2003 after a 29–35 start to the season. The Mets replaced him with assistant GM Jim Duquette on an interim basis. The Mets were 501-442 between July 16, 1997 and June 11, 2003, during his tenure.

In the late 1990s, Phillips assembled a Mets team made up of stars, such as Al Leiter, Mike Piazza, and Robin Ventura, as well as excellent role players, that played in the 2000 World Series against the New York Yankees. He is also credited with drafting David Wright, Scott Kazmir, and Lastings Milledge, and signing José Reyes. Additionally, Phillips is criticized for acquiring aging and ineffective players with large contracts such as Mo Vaughn, Roberto Alomar, Pedro Astacio, Mike Bordick, Bobby Bonilla, Rickey Henderson, Kenny Rogers, and Jeromy Burnitz. He had an uneasy, if not volatile, relationship with manager Bobby Valentine, and when Phillips decided to fire Valentine before the 2003 season, many expected the GM to be next. He traded future star, Jason Bay, and also attempted to trade star shortstop José Reyes to the Cleveland Indians.

Phillips is often erroneously blamed for trading Kazmir to the Tampa Bay Devil Rays for Victor Zambrano on the July 31, 2004 trade deadline. Kazmir went on to become an All-Star, while Zambrano never really made an impact with the Mets and was out of MLB a few years later. It was, however, his successor Jim Duquette and Jeff Wilpon who made the deal.

=== Harassment allegations ===
For a brief stint in 1998, Phillips took a leave of absence as general manager because of allegations of sexual harassment. He admitted to consensual sex with the woman, Rosa Rodriguez, who filed the suit, as well as multiple other affairs, but denied harassment and the civil suit was settled out of court. Phillips was away from the team for a total of eight days. The Mets defended Phillips privately and publicly, and the alleged victim's attorney was even quoted as believing in his sincerity.

== Broadcasting career ==
=== ESPN analyst ===
Phillips was hired as a baseball color analyst for ESPN prior to the 2005 baseball season, and was a regular on the nightly programs Baseball Tonight and SportsCenter. He primarily served as an in-game analyst during Wednesday Night Baseball telecasts through 2008, moving to the Sunday Night Baseball booth the following season. He also served as an analyst on Monday Night Baseball.

As an analyst he was critical of the Cincinnati Reds Rule 5 Draft acquisition, Josh Hamilton, stating that Hamilton, who had walked away from the game because of substance abuse issues, was being given the chance to make the major league team (through the Rule 5 draft) without spending the time in the minor leagues which the other players had, thus sending the wrong message to those players.

=== Dismissal from ESPN ===
On September 2, 2009, Phillips' wife of 19 years, Marni, filed for divorce. On October 21, 2009 Phillips revealed that he had been involved in an extramarital affair with a 22-year-old ESPN production assistant. After an initial suspension by ESPN, Phillips was fired by the company on October 25, 2009.

=== Career after ESPN ===
In April 2010, Phillips began contributing a weekly baseball segment on WFAN New York City, with afternoon host Mike Francesa, scheduled to continue through baseball season. Around the MLB trade deadline, Phillips co-hosted a few three-hour radio shows on the station as well.

On October 4, 2010, Phillips joined the cast of the Mad Dog Radio channel on SIRIUS XM Radio as the co-host of the Gary & Phillips In the Morning Show with Gary Williams. After Williams' departure to NBC to host the Golf Channel's morning show, Dan Graca served as Phillips' co-host on an interim basis. Later, Phillips co-hosted Evan and Phillips with Evan Cohen in the same morning time slot.

In 2012, Phillips was tabbed to serve as a radio analyst for a limited schedule of Los Angeles Angels of Anaheim games distributed nationally by Compass Media Networks.

Phillips currently works as a host on SiriusXM's MLB Network Radio on The Leadoff Spot with Xavier Scruggs and Eduardo Perez.

Phillips also currently works as a baseball analyst on TSN 1050 radio in Toronto, as well as appearing nationally on television as an insider on TSN in Canada.

== Video games ==
Phillips was a color commentator alongside Gary Thorne and John Kruk in Major League Baseball 2K9, Major League Baseball 2K10, Major League Baseball 2K11, Major League Baseball 2K12, and MLB 2K13.

Preceded by Joe McIlvaine	New York Mets General Manager; 1997–2003	Succeeded by Jim Duquette
