= Garber High School =

Location
- 213 Pine Street; Essexville, Michigan 48732; United States; 43°36′26″N 83°50′02″W

Information
- School type: Public
- Established: 1964
- School district: Essexville-Hampton Public Schools
- Superintendent: Dr. Davion Lewis
- Principal: Brian Campbell
- Teaching staff: 41.85 (on a FTE basis)
- Grades: 9–12
- Enrollment: 489 (2024-2025)
- Student to teacher ratio: 11.68
- Colors: Columbia Blue, White
- Athletics: Tri-Valley East Conference
- Nickname: Dukes
- Newspaper: The Daily Duke
- Yearbook: Aristocrat
- Website: www.e-hps.net/o/ghs

Garber High School is a public high school serving grades 9–12 located in Essexville, Michigan. It lies within the Essexville-Hampton school district in Bay County. It is located adjacent to Cramer Junior High School.

== History ==
Garber High School opened for classes in the fall of 1964 and was dedicated in 1965. The school was built on farm property acquired from the Garber family. The Garber farm was founded by John and Melissa Garber in the 1800s. The farm was passed on to Otto Garber and his wife Mabel. In addition to farming, Otto Garber was a president in the village of Essexville. Garber sold the land to the district in the early 1960s.

== Campus ==
Garber has five computer labs, including a 'MacIntosh' lab, designed for a variety of applications from computer assisted drafting and design to accounting. The Mac Labs were removed in the 2010s. The building also features a state of the art technology hall with a rear projection screen. As with other buildings in the district, Garber added technology to all classrooms and the media center with the passage of the bond issue in 1997. It was announced in 2024 that the school campus would house a new Regional STEM Center.

== Demographics ==
The demographic breakdown of the students enrolled in 2024-25 was:

- American Indian/Alaska Native - 0.2%
- Asian - 0.4%
- Black - 1.6%
- Hispanic - 6.1%
- Native Hawaiian/Pacific Islander - 0.2%
- White - 86.7%
- Multiracial - 4.7%

- Male - 51.9%
- Female - 48.0%

37.01% of the students were eligible for free or reduced-cost lunch.

== Notable alumni ==
- Jon Morosi (born 1982), American baseball journalist
- Ben VanSumeren (born 2000), American football player
- Cheyenne Nesbitt (born 1999), American heptathlete
- Lauren Jones, member of Trousdale
- Rebecca Blumenstein, American journalist
