= Óliver Pérez =

Mexican baseball player (born 1981)

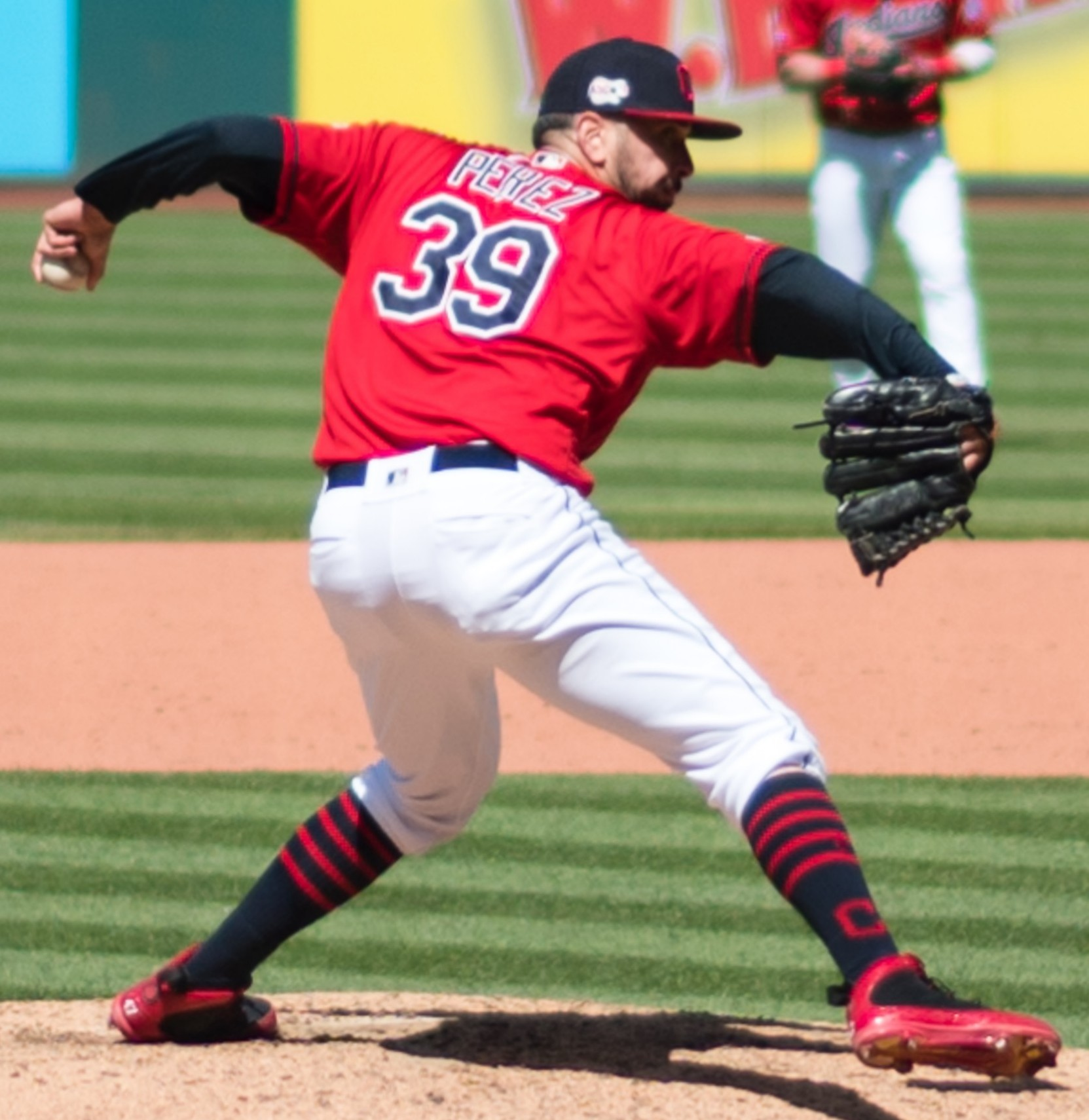
- Pérez with the Cleveland Indians in 2019
- Pitcher
- Born: August 15, 1981 (age 45); Culiacán, Sinaloa, Mexico
- Batted: Left Threw: Left

MLB debut
- June 16, 2002, for the San Diego Padres

Last MLB appearance
- April 24, 2022, for the Arizona Diamondbacks

Career statistics
- Win–loss record: 74–94
- Earned run average: 4.37
- Strikeouts: 1,546
- Stats at Baseball Reference

Teams
- San Diego Padres (2002–2003); Pittsburgh Pirates (2003–2006); New York Mets (2006–2010); Seattle Mariners (2012–2013); Arizona Diamondbacks (2014–2015); Houston Astros (2015); Washington Nationals (2016–2017); Cleveland Indians (2018–2021); Arizona Diamondbacks (2022)
Medals
Men's baseball
Representing Mexico
World Baseball Classic
Bronze medal – third place	2023 Miami	Team

Óliver Pérez Martínez (born August 15, 1981) is a Mexican former professional baseball pitcher. He played 20 seasons in Major League Baseball (MLB) for the San Diego Padres, Pittsburgh Pirates, New York Mets, Seattle Mariners, Arizona Diamondbacks, Houston Astros, Washington Nationals, and Cleveland Indians. He competed for the Mexico national baseball team in the 2006, 2009, 2013, 2017 and 2023 World Baseball Classic.

== Professional career ==
=== San Diego Padres ===
Pérez was signed by the San Diego Padres as an amateur free agent in 1999. He made his debut with the Padres in 2002. Pérez did well for a rookie after being called up by the Padres in 2002, striking out over a batter per inning, but he suffered from control issues at times. He regressed somewhat in 2003.

=== Pittsburgh Pirates ===
In August 2003, Pérez was sent by San Diego to Pittsburgh along with Jason Bay and Cory Stewart in exchange for Brian Giles.

Before the 2004 season, the team overhauled his pitching mechanics. His average of 10.97 strikeouts per nine innings was highest in the Majors (239 SO/196 IP); his 2.98 ERA was fifth in the National League (tied with Roger Clemens); and his 12–10 record could have been ever better with reasonable run support early in the season. Pirates' bats provided two or fewer runs in Pérez' 16 starts before All-Star break, causing him to post a 5–4 record with five no decisions despite a 3.24 ERA. In that season, Pérez pitched at least six innings and allowed three or fewer runs in 21 of his 30 starts (70%). Through this first three seasons, Pérez had compiled a 20–25 record with 474 strikeouts and a 3.86 ERA in 412.2 innings. His 239 strikeouts that year are currently the third-most in a season by a modern-day Pirate, trailing only Bob Veale's 276 in 1965 and 250 in 1964.

By contrast, Pérez's 2005 season was disappointing. He posted a 5.85 ERA in a season plagued by injuries. The Pirates were forced to place him on the disabled list on June 29 after he broke his toe kicking a cart following a loss to St. Louis. He missed two and a half months, returning in September to post a 4.58 ERA in 19.2 late season innings. Pérez had also lost significant speed off his fastball.

Pérez represented Mexico in the inaugural World Baseball Classic, where Mexico was eliminated in the second group stage.

In 2006, Pérez opened the Pirates' season as the number one starter. On June 27, Pérez was sent to the Pirates bullpen after struggling through the first half of the season with an ERA over 6.00. On June 29, he was sent to the Triple-A Indianapolis Indians, with Tom Gorzelanny being called up to replace him in the starting rotation.

=== New York Mets ===
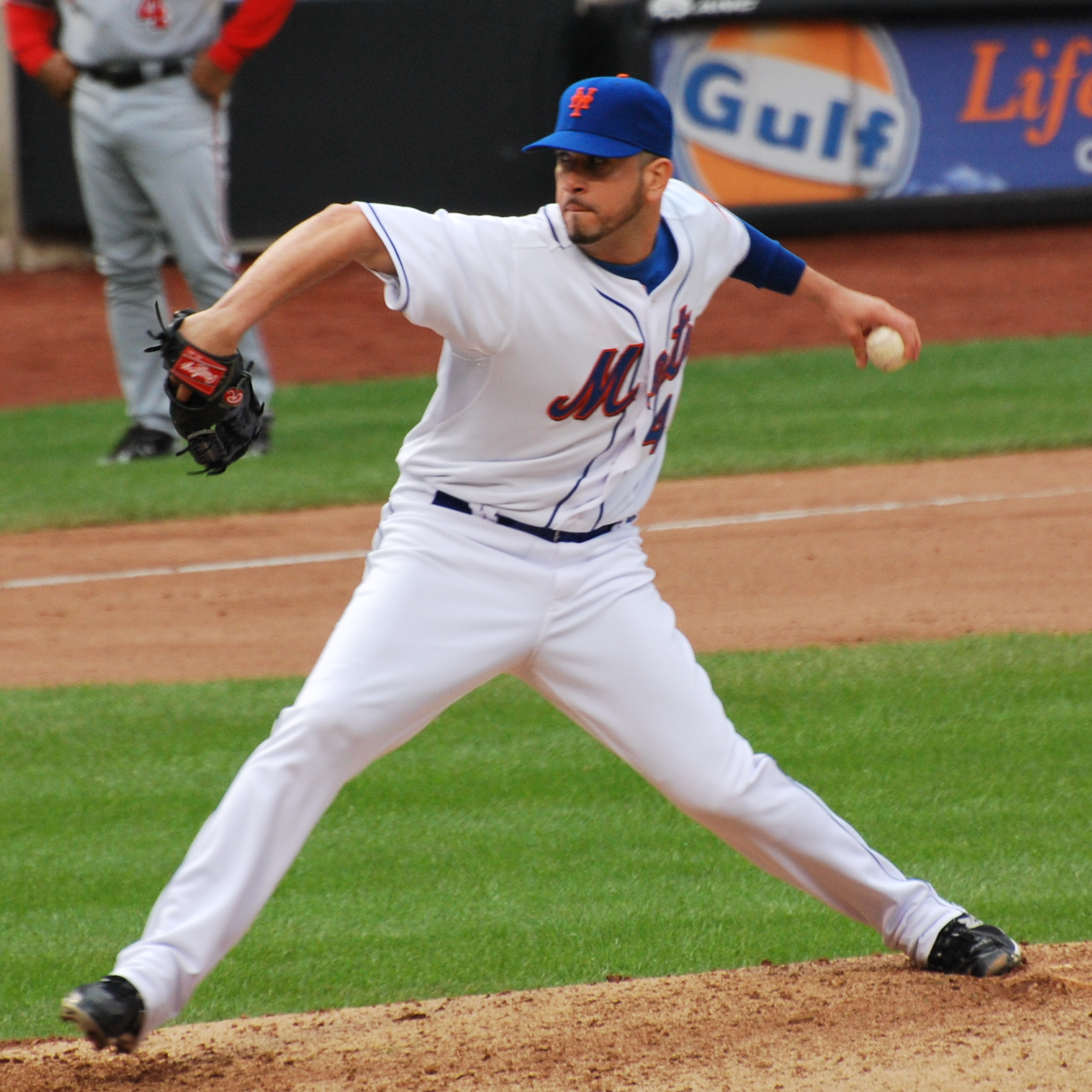
Pérez pitching for the New York Mets in 2010

On July 31, 2006, Pérez and Roberto Hernández were traded to the New York Mets in exchange for Xavier Nady. The Mets assigned Pérez to their AAA affiliate, the Norfolk Tides. He was recalled to the Mets' major league roster on August 26, 2006. After two subpar starts, Pérez threw a complete-game shutout against the Atlanta Braves in the second game of a doubleheader on September 6.

After the Mets lost two starting pitchers to injury in the final week before the playoffs started, they were forced to use Pérez in the playoff rotation. His first playoff start came in Game 4 of the NLCS, in which he picked up his first career postseason win. His second playoff start came in Game 7 of the 2006 NLCS vs. the Cardinals. He pitched six innings in, allowing one ER, and was on the mound for Endy Chavez's famous catch. The Mets eventually lost the game 3–1.

Entering the 2007 season, there were concerns about the Mets' pitching staff and whether Pérez could live up to his potential. However, Pérez finished the 2007 season 15–10 with a 3.56 ERA, striking out 174 in 177 innings pitched, while walking 79 (7th-most in the NL).

In the 2008 season, Pérez was inconsistent, posting a record of 10–7 with a 4.22 ERA. He was also prone to big innings striking at any moment. An example was in a start against the San Francisco Giants, he went 1/3 of an inning allowing 5 hits and 6 runs, all of them earned. An example of his dominance was his start against the New York Yankees on June 29. Pérez went 7 innings allowing just one run on a home run by Wilson Betemit, striking out a season-high 8 batters. After the firing of manager Willie Randolph, Pérez pitched better. At the request of Pedro Martínez and pitching coach Dan Warthen, he changed his delivery to the plate. Instead of letting his head hang down when he made his delivery, he made a bowing motion. He led the majors in walks, with 105, and was 10th in the NL in wild pitches, with 9. His 17 no decisions were the most among MLB starting pitchers in 2008.

On February 3, 2009, the Mets signed Pérez to a three-year $36 million deal. On May 6, Pérez was put on the disabled list due to patellar tendinitis in his right leg. He returned to the rotation on July 8, 2009. On August 26, Pérez was diagnosed with patellar tendinitis in his right knee and underwent season-ending surgery. He finished the season 3–4 with a 6.82 ERA.

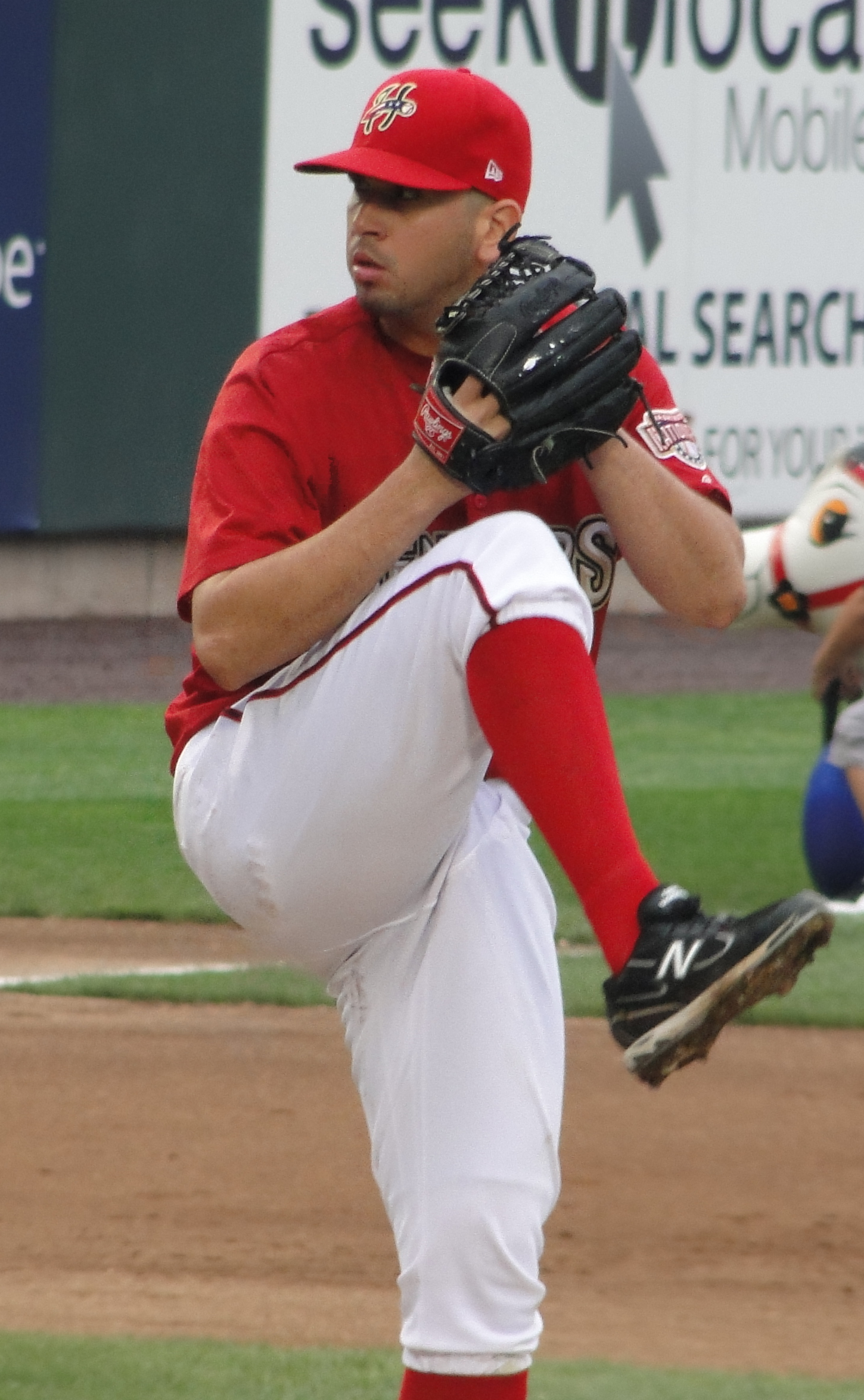
Pérez with the Harrisburg Senators in 2011

On May 15, 2010, manager Jerry Manuel moved Pérez to the bullpen. Pérez refused a minor league assignment to work on his pitching, despite both his poor play and repeated attempts by the Mets' front office.

On June 5, 2010, the Mets placed Pérez on the 15-day DL due to patella tendinitis of his right knee. As Pérez was placed on the DL soon after refusing an assignment to the minor leagues a second time, the league investigated the timing of the DL stint, later clearing it. After July 21, Pérez made only six appearances, all in relief. Pérez finished the 2010 season 0–5, with a 6.80 ERA in 46.1 innings pitched.

The Mets unconditionally released Pérez on March 21, 2011, still responsible for the remaining $12 million on his contract.

=== Washington Nationals ===
On March 25, 2011, Pérez signed a minor league contract with the Washington Nationals. Perez chose to join the Nationals because their pitching coordinator, Spin Williams, was his pitching coach with Pittsburgh. Pérez was assigned to the Harrisburg Senators of the Class AA Eastern League. He was 3-5 and pitched to a 3.09 ERA in 15 starts, but did not receive a promotion. Williams suggested to Pérez that he should transition into a relief pitcher. He elected free agency following the season on November 2.

=== Seattle Mariners ===
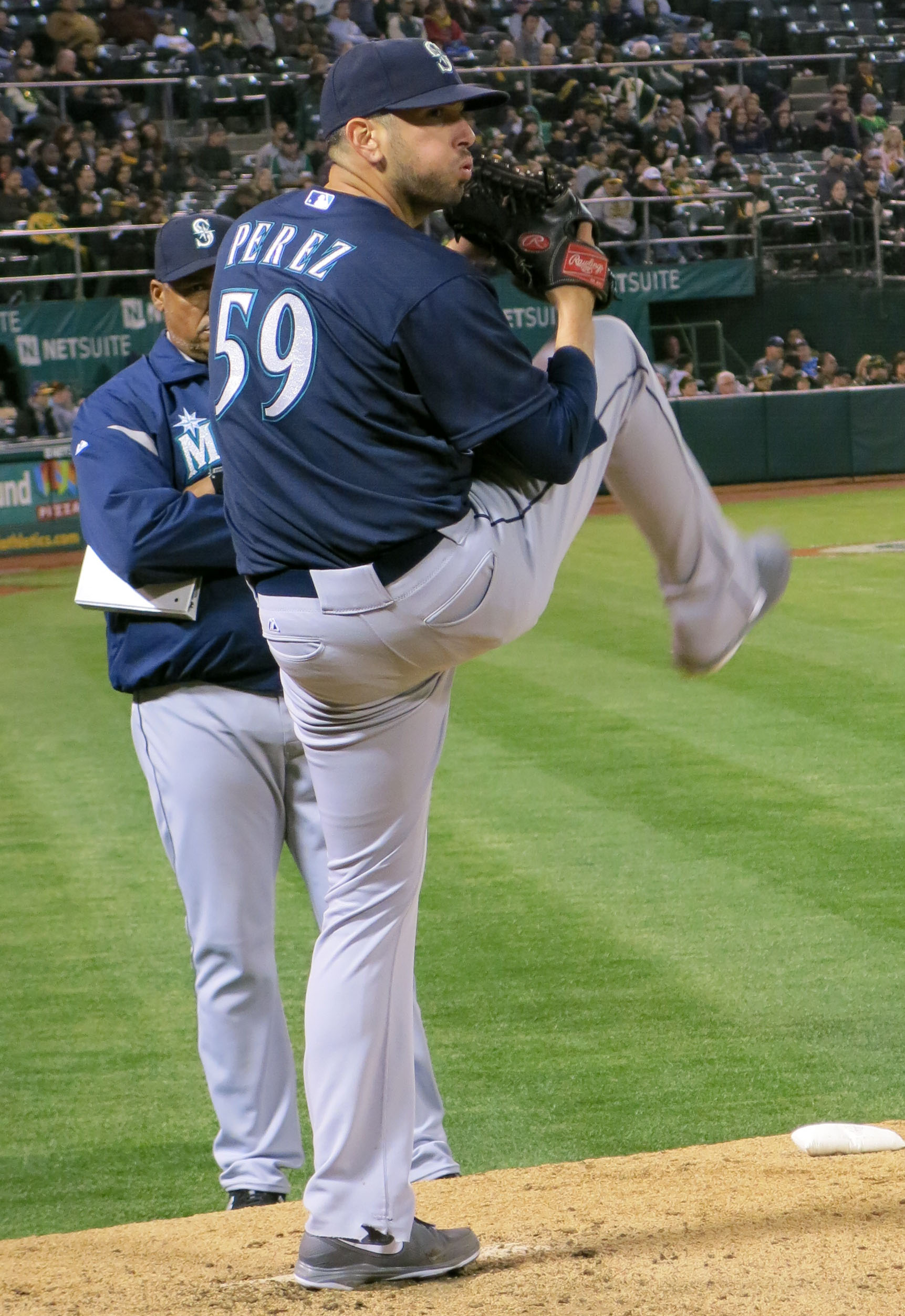
Pérez pitching for the Seattle Mariners in 2013

On January 19, 2012, the Seattle Mariners signed Pérez to a minor league deal with an invitation to spring training. The contract contained a $750,000 bonus for making the Mariners 25-man roster and $250,000 in performance incentives. Pérez made 22 relief appearances with the Tacoma Rainiers of the Class AAA Pacific Coast League, was 2–2 with a 4.65 ERA, and was promoted to the major league club on June 16 as a reliever. In his first month back in the majors since 2010, observers took note of his improved fastball velocity and strikeout-to-walk ratio. In 2012, Pérez went 1–3 with a 2.12 ERA with 29.2 innings in 33 games.

On November 3, Pérez signed a one-year, $1.5 million deal with up to $600,000 in performance bonuses.

=== Arizona Diamondbacks ===
On March 10, 2014, the Arizona Diamondbacks officially confirmed that Pérez had signed a two-year, $4.25 million contract.

=== Houston Astros ===
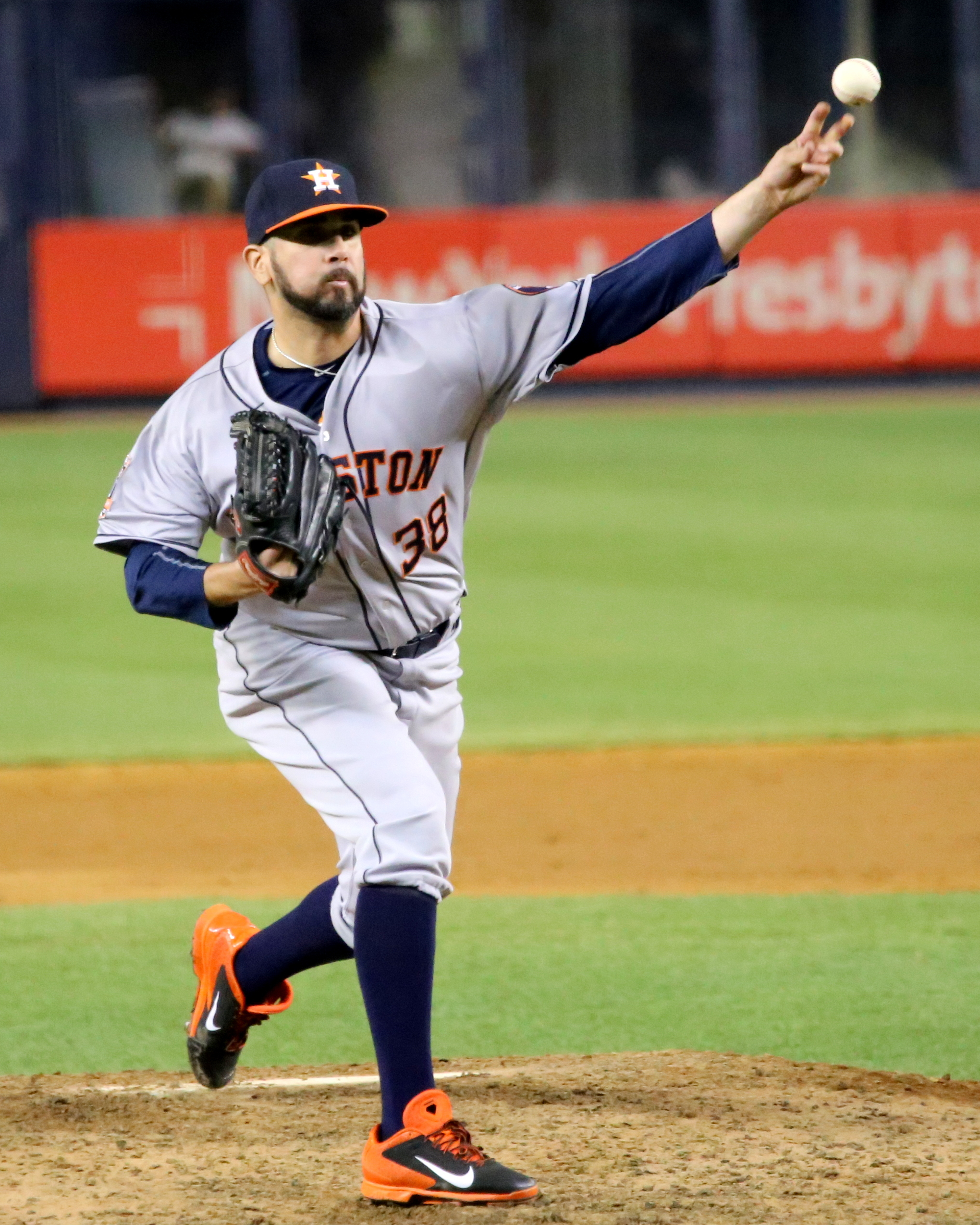
Pérez pitching for the Houston Astros in 2015

On August 8, 2015, the Arizona Diamondbacks traded Pérez to the Houston Astros for minor league pitcher Junior Garcia. In 2015 with Houston, he was 0–3 with a 6.75 ERA. He was included on the Astros ALDS roster against the Kansas City, he was 0–0 with a 27.00 ERA in 2 appearances as the Astros lost in five games. He became a free agent following the season.

=== Washington Nationals (second stint) ===
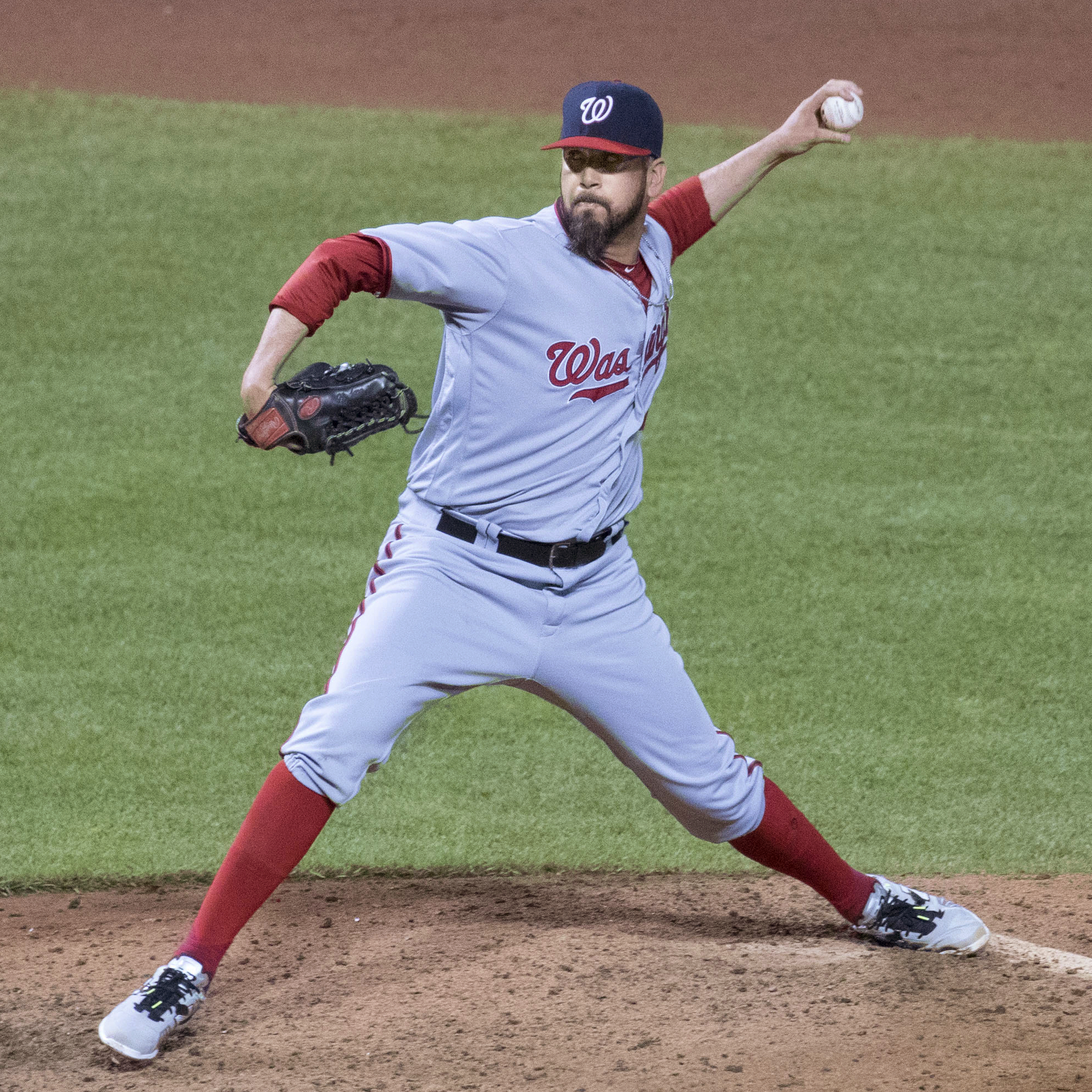
Pérez pitching for the Washington Nationals in 2016

On December 11, 2015, Pérez signed a two-year, $7 million contract with the Washington Nationals. On April 24, 2016, with the Nationals trailing the Minnesota Twins after 15 innings, and with two outs and Nationals shortstop Danny Espinosa on second base, Pérez hit a bunt that appeared to be rolling foul, but Minnesota catcher John Ryan Murphy picked it up and threw it away while attempting a putout at first, allowing Espinosa to score the tying run from second. In the next inning, Washington right fielder Chris Heisey hit a leadoff home run to end the game, and Pérez was credited with the win. In 2016, he was 2–3 with a 4.95 ERA.

In 2017, he was 0–0 with a 4.64 ERA. He became a free agent following the season.

On February 24, 2018, Pérez signed a minor-league contract with the Cincinnati Reds. He was released on March 22, 2018.

=== New York Yankees ===
On March 31, 2018, Pérez signed a minor-league contract with the New York Yankees. He was released on June 1, 2018, after exercising an opt-out clause that would grant him his release if he was not called up to the majors.

=== Cleveland Indians ===
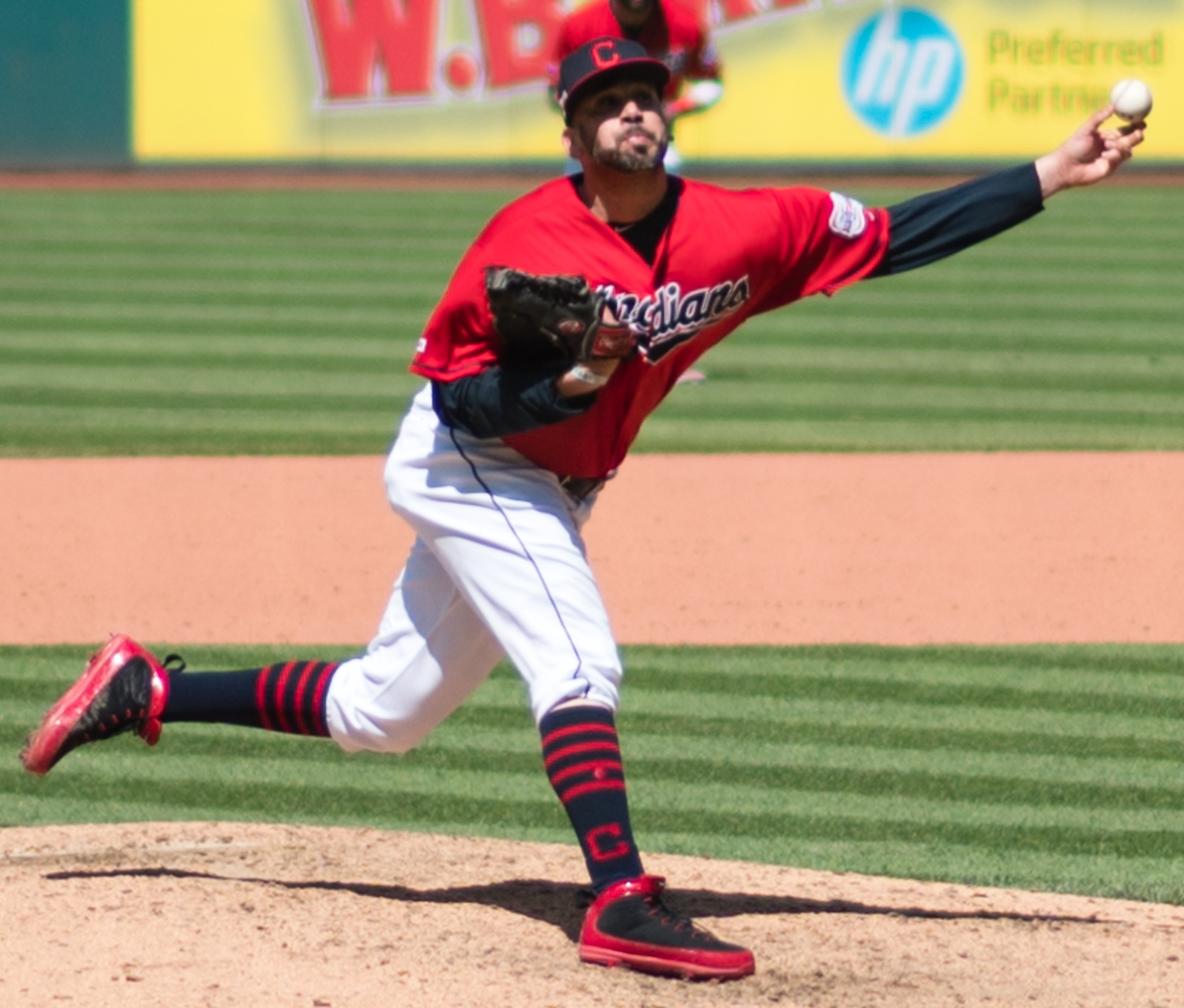
Pérez pitching for the Cleveland Indians in 2019

On June 2, 2018, Pérez signed a major-league deal with the Cleveland Indians. He contributed to a notable oddity on June 29, when he recorded a relief appearance with a walk and no pitches. This is because under recent MLB rules changes, it was no longer necessary to actually pitch four balls in order to grant an intentional walk. After Perez had been brought into the game by manager Terry Francona to pitch to left-handed batter Dustin Fowler, Oakland Athletics' manager Bob Melvin sent right-handed batter Mark Canha to pinch hit. Francona then ordered an intentional base on balls, and Canha was awarded first base with no pitches being thrown. Melvin then had Chad Pinder (right) pinch-hit for Matt Joyce (left), so Francona countered by replacing Pérez with right-handed reliever Zach McAllister, thus making Pérez the first MLB pitcher to officially pitch in a game without actually throwing a ball. Pérez finished the 2018 season with a 1.39 ERA and a .155 batting average against in 51 games of relief; however, in only 15 appearances did he pitch at least one inning.

The Indians re-signed Pérez to a one-year contract on January 25, 2019. The deal includes a vesting option for the 2020 season. For the 2019 season, Pérez finished with a 3.98 ERA in 67 games.

On July 26, 2020, Pérez appeared in the 18th Major League season of his career, becoming the longest-tenured Mexican player in league history. With the 2020 Cleveland Indians, Pérez appeared in 21 games, compiling a 1–1 record with 2.00 ERA and 14 strikeouts in 18.0 innings pitched. He became a free agent following the 2020 season.

On February 18, 2021, Pérez re-signed with the Indians on a minor league contract worth a $1.25 million base salary if he made the majors, with $1.5 million in incentives. The Indians selected Pérez's contract on March 27, 2021. Pérez pitched 3.2 scoreless innings before being designated for assignment on April 28, 2021. On May 2, Pérez cleared waivers and elected free agency.

=== Toros de Tijuana ===
On May 20, 2021, Pérez signed with the Toros de Tijuana of the Mexican League. Pérez pitched in 21 games for the Toros, recording a 2.63 ERA with 35 strikeouts in 24.0 innings of work.

=== Arizona Diamondbacks (second stint) ===
On March 21, 2022, Pérez signed a minor league contract with the Arizona Diamondbacks organization. On April 6, his contract was purchased and he was selected to the Opening Day roster. He gave up seven earned runs in four appearances with the team. On April 25, Pérez was designated for assignment. He was released by the organization on April 28.

=== Toros de Tijuana (second stint) ===
On April 29, 2022, Pérez re-signed with the Toros de Tijuana of the Mexican League. He made 32 appearances for Tijuana in 2022, posting a 3–1 record and 3.38 ERA with 35 strikeouts in 29.1 innings pitched. On January 19, 2023, Pérez retired from professional baseball.

=== Leones de Yucatán ===
On June 7, 2023, Pérez signed with the Leones de Yucatán of the Mexican League. He pitched 1/3 of an inning, striking out the only batter he faced. He retired officially on June 9.

== Personal life ==
Pérez and his wife have three children. They live in Paradise Valley, Arizona.
