= MLB Network Radio =

American sports radio station

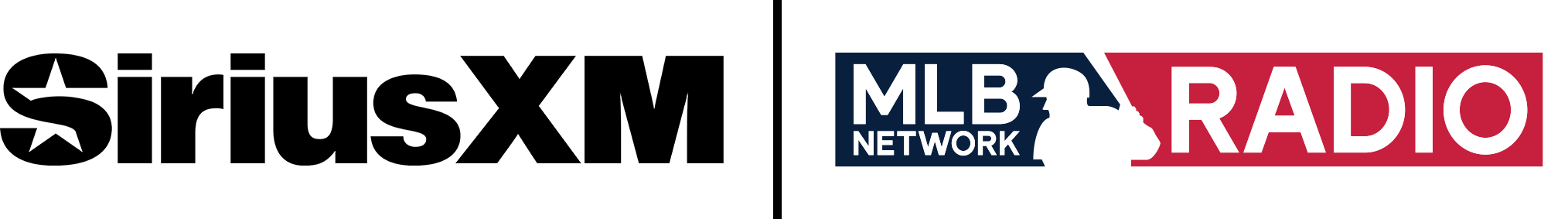
- Broadcast area: United States; Canada
- Frequencies: XM 89; SR 89
- Branding: MLB Network Radio on SiriusXM

Programming
- Format: Baseball talk and game broadcasts
- Affiliations: MLB Network (television); Major League Baseball on ESPN Radio (live national play-by-play)

Ownership
- Owner: Major League Baseball; SiriusXM

History
- First air date: February 15, 2005

Technical information
- Class: Satellite Radio Station

Links
- Website: MLB Network Radio

MLB Network Radio (formerly MLB Home Plate, Channel 89) is an American sports talk radio station on SiriusXM that features Major League Baseball related talk shows, as well as archives and live reports about live game action, along with other baseball leagues and teams worldwide.

The network also simulcasts live national play-by-play from games broadcast by Major League Baseball on ESPN Radio, along with occasional highlight coverage from other team radio networks.

MLB Home Plate launched in February 2005 to retain listeners with programs related to baseball when games were not occurring, and especially to provide continuing content during the hot stove season. MLB Network Radio is carried on XM channel 89, and was added to the "Best of XM" package on Sirius Satellite Radio on December 10, 2008, airing on channel 209.

== First season on the air ==
MLB Home Plate launched at the start of the Major League Baseball season in 2005 with the league's deal to bring game broadcasts to XM. It launched with a full lineup, and on its first day attracted immediate attention, when former player José Canseco claimed towards his former manager/co-host Kevin Kennedy that Sammy Sosa and Mark McGwire took steroids during the 1998 home run record chase. Around launch time, XM announced that they had signed Cal Ripken Jr. to do a Saturday mid-morning show on Home Plate. The channel was aided throughout the season as XM's subscriber growth prediction exceeded what they expected, with retailers claiming that 15-17% of people who signed up for XM did it for baseball.

The end of the 2005 season was especially active as the satellite company carried both feeds of both teams during the post-season games, along with the national, home, road and Spanish calls of each World Series game, typing into a promotional giveaway where all adults in attendance at U.S. Cellular Field for Game 1 of the 2005 World Series received a free Roady XT satellite radio unit and subscription.

== 2006–09 ==
At the beginning of MLB's second season on XM Radio, XM Radio Canada decided to add all 14 MLB Play-by-Play channels to their platform. Canada already carried Home Plate, and now they would carry the complete Major League Baseball package barring XM 174 (Spanish broadcasts). In exchange, they would produce channel 179 with some select exclusive content, and make that channel the home for all the Toronto Blue Jays home games. XM Canada also produced interviews for play on the other play-by-play channels when no games were being aired.

In late April 2006, DirecTV removed MLB Home Plate from their audio-only channel offerings, along with all other talk-based product from XM outside a few select channels. On March 29, 2008, Home Plate was added to XM Radio Online.

== 2010–present ==
MLB Home Plate would be rebranded to MLB Network Radio on April 4, 2010 to take advantage of the TV network's recently established brand in time for the new season. Joining the lineup of the channel was MLB Network audio simulcasts of their own talk programming, along with broadcasts of MLB Tonight and other network shows such as Hot Stove. Their programming was also changed with the rebranding.

On May 4, 2011 as SiriusXM began the lengthy process of merging the Sirius and XM lineups, MLB Network Radio was moved to its new highlight sports tier at channel 89 on XM away from leading off the play-by-play channels on channel 175, and channel 209 on Sirius, which would remain its position on those lineups until a full merger of MLB Radio onto channel 89 universally as of April 13, 2021.

== Shows ==
- The Leadoff Spot

Weekdays 7-10 a.m. ET

The show features a program hosted by former front office executive Steve Phillips alongside former MLB players Xavier Scruggs, and Eduardo Perez. The show focuses on analysis, discussion, and debate surrounding current Major League Baseball headline stories, teams, and players.

- Power Alley

Weekdays 10 a.m. - 1 p.m. ET

Former General Manager Jim Duquette and Mike Ferrin discuss the big baseball news of the day, talk to players and executives from around baseball and take calls.

- High Heat with Christopher Russo

Weekdays 1-2 p.m. ET

Russo’s MLB Network Show is a fast-paced, one-hour weekday discussion on all 30 MLB clubs featuring interviews with players and club personnel.

- Loud Outs

Weekdays 2-5 p.m. ET

Loud Outs is a show hosted by Ryan Spilborghs, C. J. Nitkowski, Kevin Frandsen, Jensen Lewis, Chris Gimenez, Justin Morneau, Jenny Cavnar, and more.

- Intentional Talk

Weekdays 5-6 p.m. ET

Intentional Talk is a baseball studio program hosted by Siera Santos alongside former Major League Baseball players and World Series champions Kevin Millar and Ryan Dempster. The show features a mix of baseball analysis, humor, and interviews with people around the sport.

- MLB Tonight

Weeknights 6-7 p.m. and 10pm-1am. ET

MLB Tonight is the flagship live studio program on MLB Network. Hosted by a rotating lineup that includes Greg Amsinger and Adnan Virk, alongside analysts such as Dan Plesac and various other former big leaguers, the show provides game highlights, live in-game look-ins, and studio analysis.

- MLB Roundtrip

All Week Long 2 a.m.-6 a.m. ET

MLB Roundtrip is a nightly postgame program that recaps the day in baseball. Hosted by Jeff Joyce and Robert Brender, it airs following the final game of the day and provides a recap of the MLB games, including highlights and postgame interviews.

- Remember When

Saturdays 8-10 a.m. ET

Remember When is a weekly radio program hosted by Ed Randall and former MLB manager Kevin Kennedy. The show features interviews with former players and baseball personalities focusing on the history of the sport, alongside a live call-in segment for listeners.

- Loud Outs

Saturdays 10 a.m. - 1 p.m. ET

Loud Outs is hosted every Saturday by former Major Leaguers Chris Gimenez and Kevin Frandsen. It uses the hosts' years of MLB experience to offer insight into team clubhouses, dugouts, and broader league dynamics.

- Minors and Majors with Grant Paulsen

Sundays 8-10 a.m. ET

Hosted by Mike Paulsen, the program reviews baseball topics across many levels of play, including Youth Baseball (Little League), the Minor Leagues, and the MLB. The show features an open call-in format that accepts participants of all ages.

- Front Office

Sundays 10-1 a.m. ET

Hosted by former MLB general managers Jim Bowden and Jim Duquette, the show focuses on the analysis of front office decisions, player transactions, and MLB team issues.

- Sunday Sliders

Sundays 1-4 p.m. ET

Hosted by Dani Wexelman and former MLB Pitcher Trevor May, the show airs every Sunday and provides news and analysis from around the league while blending in discussions on pop culture.

- Other MLB Network Radio Hosts & Analysts
  - A. J. Ramos
  - Dan Graca
  - Daron Sutton
  - David Aardsma
  - Jim Memolo
  - Jon Morosi
  - Mike Stanton (left-handed pitcher)
  - Tyler Kepner
