= Jim Duquette =

American baseball executive

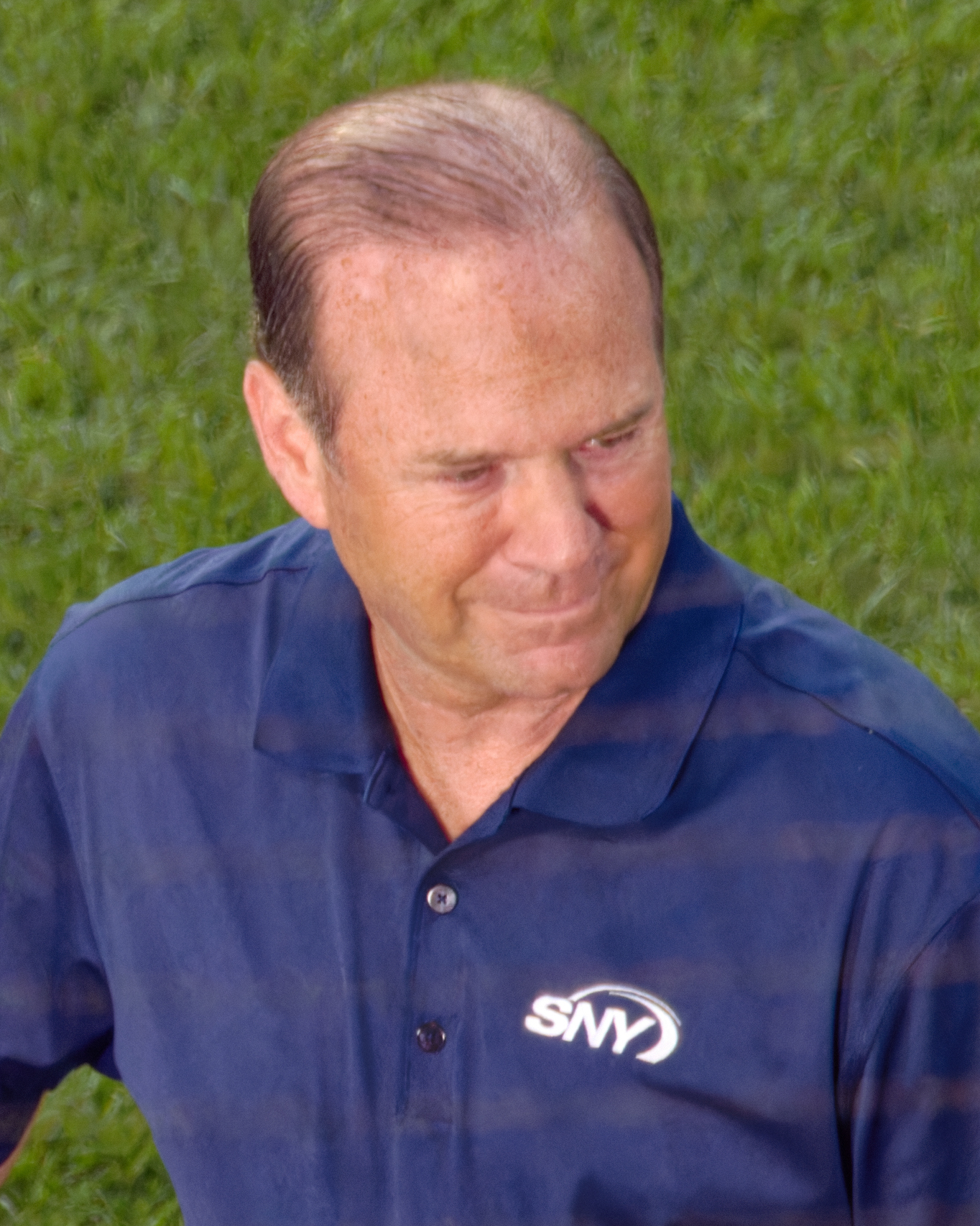
- Duquette in 2022
- General manager
- Born: May 4, 1966 (age 60)
- Stats at Baseball Reference

Teams
- New York Mets (1995–1997); Houston Astros (1997); New York Mets (1998–2005); Baltimore Orioles (2005–2007)

Jim Duquette is an American baseball executive and broadcaster. He spent nine non-consecutive seasons in the front office of the New York Mets, most notably as their general manager from 2003-2004. He currently serves as a baseball analyst for SiriusXM's MLB Network Radio, where he has provided analysis for every League Championship Series (LCS) and World Series since 2009.

With the Orioles he worked under the Executive Vice President of Baseball Operations, Mike Flanagan, who was also considered the team's general manager. He is currently a host on SiriusXM's MLB Network Radio. His extensive work includes hosting shows directly from spring training locations, as well as providing in-depth analysis for every League Championship Series (LCS) and World Series since 2009.

== Executive career ==
Duquette's career started with the New York Mets in 1995, when he served as assistant farm director. He left the Mets organization in 1997 to join the Houston Astros as their director of player development, but returned to New York after a year, this time as farm director.

In 2000, Duquette was named the Mets assistant general manager (GM). On June 12, 2003, after Mets GM Steve Phillips was fired due to a poor start, Duquette was named the interim GM. On October 28, 2003, Duquette had the interim tag removed and was named the permanent GM of the Mets.

Jim Duquette's tenure as the Mets' GM is largely remembered for the trade of top pitching prospect Scott Kazmir to the Tampa Bay Devil Rays for the right-handed pitcher, Victor Zambrano. That very same day, Duquette also traded away future All-Star José Bautista.

Prior to the 2005 season, the Mets announced that Omar Minaya would be replacing Duquette as GM. Duquette opted to stay with the organization regardless of the reshuffle, returning to his former post as assistant GM.

On October 20, 2005, Duquette left the Mets organization and joined the Baltimore Orioles as Vice President of Baseball Operations working alongside Mike Flanagan, the Executive Vice President of Baseball Operations and the GM of the Orioles. Duquette left the Orioles after the 2007 season

== Broadcasting career ==
Duquette joined MLB Network Radio on SiriusXM as a baseball analyst in 2009, where he has remained since. In addition to extensive hosting shows directly from spring training locations, Duquette has provided analysis for every League Championship Series (LCS) and World Series since 2009. He also is currently the co-host of "Power Alley" with Mike Ferrin on the channel.

In addition to work for MLB Network Radio, Duquette has also contributed for The Athletic.

During the 2012 season, Duquette joined WFAN as a fill-in commentator for their NY Mets radio broadcasts.

== Personal ==
Duquette was a standout baseball player himself at Williams College, in Williamstown, Massachusetts. Duquette's cousin, Dan Duquette also was a major league general manager with the Montreal Expos and the Boston Red Sox and was most recently the executive vice-president of baseball operations for the Baltimore Orioles. His brother, Pat Duquette is the head men's basketball coach at UMass Lowell. In 2019, the three Duquettes were among 15 athletes, five coaches and three contributors to be inducted into the inaugural Dalton CRA Athletic Hall of Fame in Dalton, Mass.

Duquette donated his kidney to his 10 year old daughter in a procedure at Johns Hopkins Hospital on June 4, 2012. He serves on the board of the NephCure Kidney International, an organization dedicated to raising funds and awareness for kidney diseases, including Nephrotic Syndrome and Focal Segmental Glomerulosclerosis (FSGS), conditions that his daughter was diagnosed with prior to undergoing a kidney transplant.

Preceded by Steve Phillips	New York Mets General Manager; 2004	Succeeded by Omar Minaya
