= Ben VanSumeren =

American football player (born 2000)

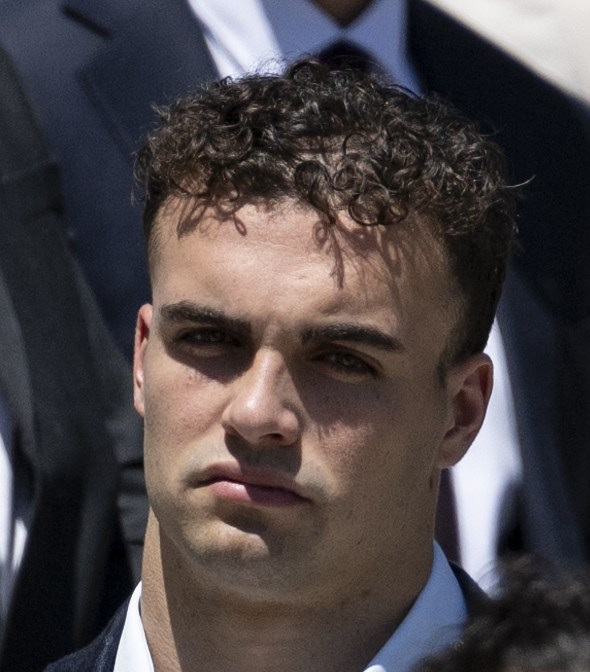
- VanSumeren in 2025

No. 47 – Kansas City Chiefs
- Position: Fullback
- Roster status: Active

Personal information
- Born: May 5, 2000 (age 26); Bay City, Michigan, U.S.
- Listed height: 6 ft 2 in (1.88 m)
- Listed weight: 258 lb (117 kg)

Career information
- High school: Garber (Essexville, Michigan)
- College: Michigan (2018–2020); Michigan State (2021–2022)
- NFL draft: 2023: undrafted

Career history
- Philadelphia Eagles (2023–2025); Buffalo Bills (2026)*; Kansas City Chiefs (2026–present)
- * Offseason or practice squad member only

Awards and highlights
- Super Bowl champion (LIX)

Career NFL statistics as of 2025
- Total tackles: 23
- Receptions: 1
- Stats at Pro Football Reference

Ben VanSumeren (born May 5, 2000) is an American professional football fullback for the Kansas City Chiefs of the National Football League (NFL). He played college football for the Michigan Wolverines and Michigan State Spartans.

VanSumeren began his NFL career as a linebacker and began playing fullback in his second season in the NFL, officially changing his position in his third NFL season.

== Early life ==
VanSumeren was born on May 5, 2000, and grew up in Bay City, Michigan. By age six, he declared that he was going to be a professional football player. He attended Garber High School in Essexville, playing at different points linebacker, defensive lineman, quarterback, running back and wide receiver when needed. VanSumeren played best at receiver, leading Bay County in receiving for three years, including a senior campaign that saw him post a regular season state record 81 receptions for 1,259 yards and 13 touchdowns, being named by Associated Press the division player of the year. Although initially committing to Iowa, he flipped to Michigan after receiving a late offer from them.

== College career ==
Recruited to play fullback, VanSumeren appeared in four games for Michigan as a true freshman in 2018, preserving his redshirt status. He moved to running back in 2019, playing five games with five rushes for 20 yards and one touchdown. He moved to linebacker in 2020, playing six games but only posting seven tackles. Due to his limited playing time, he transferred to the rival Michigan State Spartans.

In his first season at Michigan State, VanSumeren played in all 13 games, but only managed to make 12 tackles. He initially entered the transfer portal in 2022, but then opted to return to the Spartans. In his final year, he saw his first significant playing time, starting 10 of 11 games and making 81 tackles with two sacks and two pass breakups. Although VanSumeren had one year of eligibility left, he opted to accept an invitation to the East–West Shrine Bowl and declared for the NFL draft.

== Professional career ==
Pre-draft measurables
Height	Weight	Arm length	Hand span	Wingspan	40-yard dash	10-yard split	20-yard split	20-yard shuttle	Three-cone drill	Vertical jump	Broad jump	Bench press
6 ft 2 in (1.88 m)	231 lb (105 kg)	31 in (0.79 m)	9 1/4 in (0.23 m)	6 ft 4 1/2 in (1.94 m)	4.40 s	1.52 s	2.53 s	4.46 s	7.10 s	42.5 in (1.08 m)	10 ft 11 in (3.33 m)	29 reps
All values from Pro Day

=== Philadelphia Eagles ===
Despite being projected by several sources as a pick in the 2023 NFL draft, VanSumeren went unselected; afterwards, he was signed by the Philadelphia Eagles as an undrafted free agent, He was waived on August 29, and re-signed to the practice squad. Beginning on November 5, 2023, VanSumeren was called up from the practice squad for 3 consecutive weeks with his first game being against the Dallas Cowboys. Following this three-game stretch, VanSumeren was signed to the active roster on November 30. On December 25, VanSumeren started and recorded six tackles in a 33-25 victory over the New York Giants.

==== 2024 ====
In his second season, VanSumeren began playing his original college position of fullback on offense. On November 29, 2024, VanSumeren suffered a season–ending knee injury during practice. At the conclusion of the 2024 season, VanSumeren and the Eagles won the Super Bowl.

In 2024, VanSumeren played in 11 games and started 1 game.

==== 2025 ====
VanSumeren signed a one-year contract extension with the Eagles on March 12, 2025. After his re-signing, the Eagles changed VanSumeren's position from linebacker to fullback. In the team's season-opening game against the Dallas Cowboys, VanSumeren suffered a season-ending patellar tendon tear on the opening kickoff. He was placed on injured reserve on September 5.

=== Buffalo Bills ===
On April 29, 2026, VanSumeren signed a one-year contract with the Buffalo Bills. On August 30, he was waived by the Bills as a part of final roster cuts.

=== Kansas City Chiefs ===
On September 1, 2026, VanSumeren signed with the Kansas City Chiefs' practice squad. On September 14, he was elevated to the active roster ahead for the team's season opener against the Denver Broncos. On September 16, VanSumeren was signed to the Chiefs' active roster.
