= Jon Morosi =

American baseball journalist (born 1982)

Jon Paul Morosi
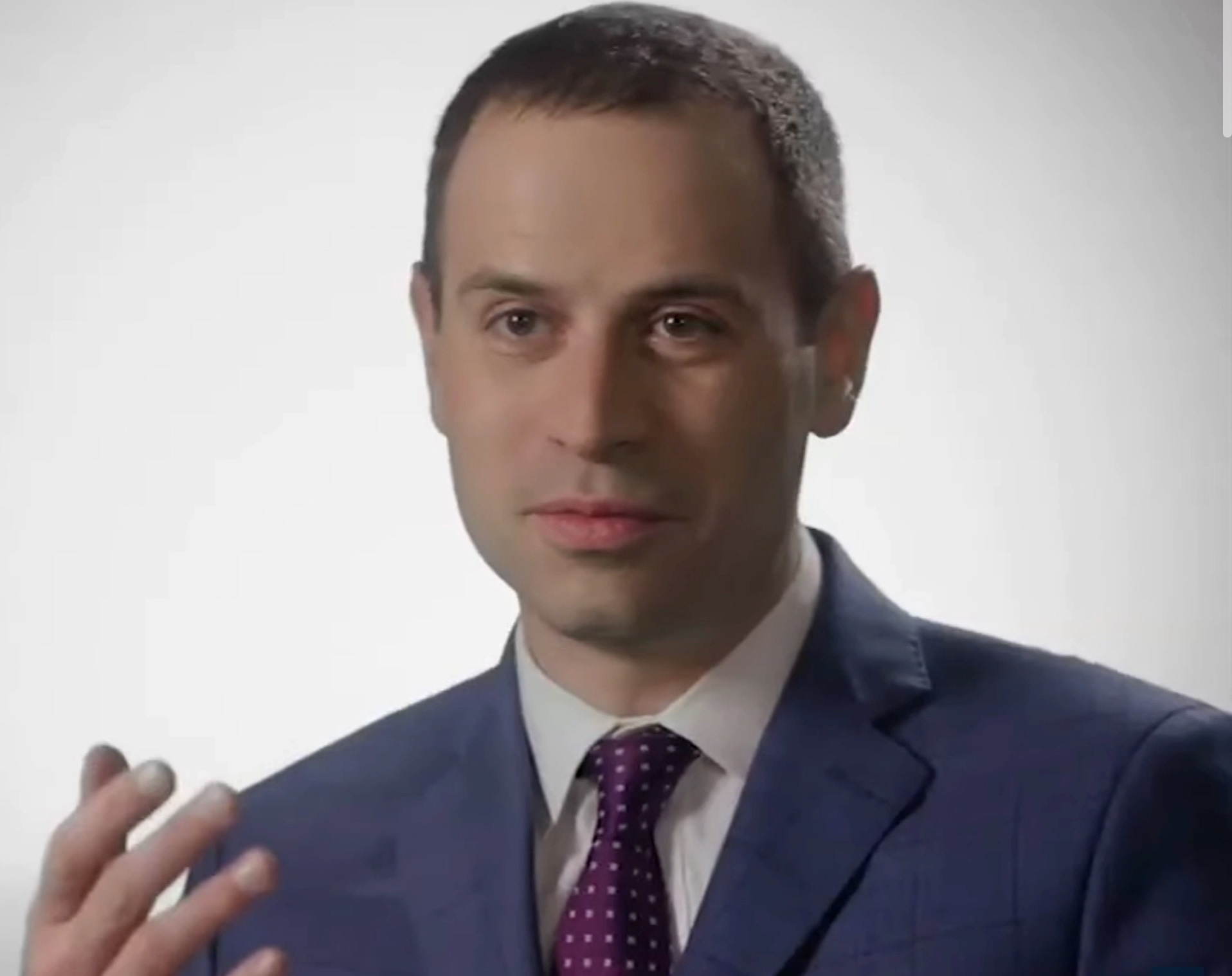
- Morosi in 2019
- Born: May 17, 1982 (age 44); Marquette, Michigan, U.S.
- Education: Garber High School, Essexville, Michigan Harvard University
- Occupations: Sportswriter; Reporter
- Title: Sports commentator
- Spouse: Alexis Morosi

Jon Paul Morosi (born May 17, 1982) is an American sportswriter and reporter. Since 2016, he is an on-air personality with MLB Network, including the flagship studio show MLB Tonight. Morosi is also a columnist for MLB.com, as well as an on-air reporter for both FOX Sports and FS1. In addition, he regularly appears on MLB Network Radio on SiriusXM and FOX Sports Radio. Morosi also worked as a Field Level Reporter for 1 2024 ALDS on TBS. In addition to his Major League Baseball duties, Morosi is a reporter for NHL Network. He has 3 daughters.

== Early life ==
Jon Paul Morosi was born in Marquette, Michigan, and attended Garber High School in Essexville, Michigan, where he was a three-sport athlete and co-editor of the student newspaper. After high school he attended Harvard University, earning a degree in environmental science and public policy. While at Harvard he played four years of junior varsity baseball and covered men's hockey for The Harvard Crimson.

== Journalism career ==
Prior to joining MLB Network, Morosi was a columnist and national baseball writer for FOXSports.com, beginning in 2009. He was hired in part due to incumbent FOX Sports baseball writer Ken Rosenthal's recommendation, whom he met four years earlier at the 2005 MLB general managers' meeting.

Previously, Morosi was a beat writer for the Detroit Free Press, covering the Tigers from 2006 to 2009. Morosi came to the Free Press after serving as a backup beat writer for the Seattle Post-Intelligencer during the Seattle Mariners' 2005 season. He also spent time at the Boston Globe and Houston Chronicle, among others.

Morosi has a passion for international baseball and the World Baseball Classic in particular. MLB Network, the exclusive rights-holder to the WBC, devoted segments in 2017 to what it termed "J.P. Morosi's International Pastime."

On December 8, 2023, Morosi was the subject of criticism when he claimed that then free agent two-way player, Shohei Ohtani was on a private jet going from Anaheim to Toronto, where he would talk to and possibly sign with the Toronto Blue Jays. This speculation coincided with a post on “X” (formerly Twitter) that went viral earlier in the day of a private jet taking off from Santa Ana, destined for Toronto Pearson International Airport. As it was later found out, the flight was unrelated. It was confirmed that Ohtani was not traveling to Toronto and that he was still residing in Anaheim. On the following day, Ohtani would announce that he signed with the Los Angeles Dodgers.

In June 2024, Morosi began hosting The Road to Cooperstown, the official podcast of the National Baseball Hall of Fame and Museum, where he interviews Hall of Famers about their lives and careers.
