= Essexville-Hampton Public Schools =

School district in Michigan

Location
- Bay County, Michigan; United States
- Coordinates: 43.60759°N 83.83608°W

District information
- Grades: Pre-school - 12
- President: Paul Sansburn
- Vice-president: Brad Neering
- Superintendent: Dr. Davion Lewis
- Schools: 4
- Budget: US$21,940,000 2022-2023 expenditures
- NCES District ID: 2613530

Students and staff
- Students: 1,523 (2024-25)
- Teachers: 100.71 (2024-25)
- Staff: 171.16 (2024-25)
- Student–teacher ratio: 15.12 (2024-25)

Other information
- Website: www.e-hps.net

The Essexville-Hampton Public Schools is a public school district in Bay County in the U.S. state of Michigan, based in Essexville, Michigan.

== History ==
The origins of Essexville-Hampton Public Schools trace back to the mid-1850s when Dutch settlers in the Hampton and Boutell Road areas recognized the need for education despite limited resources. Early settlers drained swampland and established the first school in a log building around 1860, taught by Miss Corbin. By 1870, a frame school was built, later named after the Jones family, prosperous African-American farmers in the area. This school, replaced by a red brick building in 1901, was annexed into the Essexville School District in 1957 and closed in 1959, with students transitioning to the newly built Viola Verellen School.

Several schools, including Union School (later Hughes Elementary), Hugo School, and Nolet School, contributed to the district’s expansion. Union School, established in 1870, was rebuilt multiple times after a fire and expansions, while Hugo School, founded in 1873, faced fire damage and reconstruction before its closure in 1959. The Nolet School, opened in 1903, expanded with an addition in 1951 before joining the Essexville-Hampton District in 1957 and closing shortly after. These early schools laid the foundation for the consolidated Essexville-Hampton Public Schools, shaping the district's growth and identity.

== Schools ==
The Essexville-Hampton Public Schools has two elementary schools, one junior high school, and one high school.

=== Elementary Schools ===
School name	Address	Website
W.R. Bush Elementary School	800 Nebobish Ave., Essexville, MI 48732	https://www.e-hps.net/o/bes
Verellen Elementary School	612 W Borton Rd., Essexville, MI 48732	https://www.e-hps.net/o/ves

=== Junior High School ===
School name	Address	Website
Cramer Junior High School	313 Pine St., Essexville, MI 48732	https://www.e-hps.net/o/cjh

=== High school ===
School name	Address	Website
Garber High School	213 Pine St., Essexville, MI 48732	https://www.e-hps.net/o/ghs

The district previously operated Hughes Elementary School, which began operations in 1927, and received a renovation in 1949. By 2012 the board voted to close the school effective June of that year.

== Demographics ==
The demographic breakdown of the 1,502 students enrolled in 2023-24 was:

- White – 90%
- Hispanic or Latino – 8%
- Black or African American – <1%
- American Indian/Alaska Native – <1%
- Asian – <1%
- Native Hawaiian/Pacific Islander – <1%
- Two or More Races – 2%
- Other - <1%
