= Hampton Township, Michigan =

- Charter township
- Hampton Charter Township
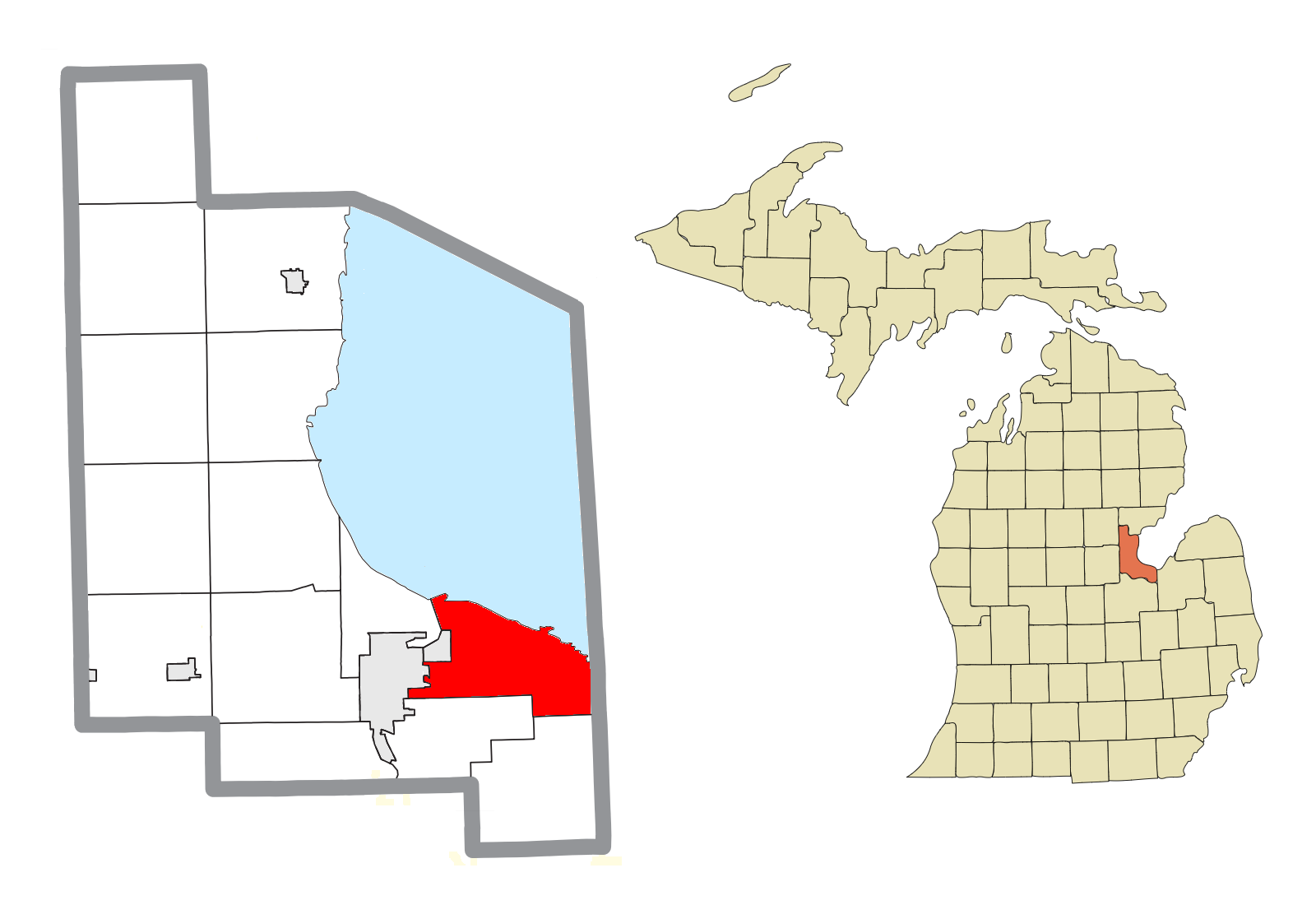
- Location within Bay County

- Location within the state of Michigan
- Coordinates: 43°36′04″N 83°48′04″W
- Country: United States
- State: Michigan
- County: Bay
- Established: 1857

Government
  - Supervisor: Teresa Close
  - Clerk: Pamela Wright

Area
  - Total: 32.5 sq mi (84.2 km^{2})
  - Land: 27.1 sq mi (70.1 km^{2})
  - Water: 5.5 sq mi (14.2 km^{2})
- Elevation: 584 ft (178 m)

Population (2020)
  - Total: 9,695
  - Density: 358/sq mi (138/km^{2})
- Time zone: UTC-5 (Eastern (EST))
  - Summer (DST): UTC-4 (EDT)
- ZIP code(s): 48708 (Bay City); 48732 (Essexville); 48747 (Munger)
- Area code: 989
- FIPS code: 26-36260
- GNIS feature ID: 1626426
- Website: Official website

Hampton Charter Township is a charter township of Bay County in the U.S. state of Michigan. The township's population was 9,695 as of the 2020 Census and is included in the Bay City Metropolitan Statistical Area.

== History ==
Hampton Township was organized on April 29, 1857, along with Williams Township when Bay County was formed from part of old Saginaw County. As the two townships gained population, they were partitioned to form other townships which reduced them in area. The settlement of Lower Saginaw eventually separated from the township as Bay City. Essexville was incorporated as a village within the township in 1883 and was separated from the township as a city in 1934.

In 2016, Consumers Energy closed its Weadock Generating Plant in Hampton. While the company indicated in early 2018 that two coal units at Karn Generating Complex, also in Hampton, will close by 2023. Thus the township expects revenue decreases and look for cost savings. After a public safety committee was formed and a town hall meeting was held, the township's Board of Trustees on October 1, 2018, voted to merge its police and fire departments.

== Geography ==
According to the United States Census Bureau, the township has a total area of 32.5 square miles (84 km^{2}), of which 27.0 square miles (70 km^{2}) is land and 5.5 square miles (14 km^{2}) (16.82%) is water.

== Demographics ==
As of the census of 2000, there were 9,902 people, 4,137 households, and 2,610 families residing in the township. The population density was 366.0 inhabitants per square mile (141.3/km^{2}). There were 4,341 housing units at an average density of 160.5 per square mile (62.0/km^{2}). The racial makeup of the township was 95.05% White, 1.33% African American, 0.48% Native American, 0.69% Asian, 0.75% from other races, and 1.70% from two or more races. Hispanic or Latino of any race were 2.58% of the population.

There were 4,137 households, out of which 28.7% had children under the age of 18 living with them, 48.5% were married couples living together, 10.9% had a female householder with no husband present, and 36.9% were non-families. 32.0% of all households were made up of individuals, and 14.4% had someone living alone who was 65 years of age or older. The average household size was 2.31 and the average family size was 2.92.

In the township the population was spread out, with 22.6% under the age of 18, 8.9% from 18 to 24, 26.4% from 25 to 44, 24.1% from 45 to 64, and 18.0% who were 65 years of age or older. The median age was 40 years. For every 100 females, there were 88.9 males. For every 100 females age 18 and over, there were 84.1 males.

The median income for a household in the township was $34,579, and the median income for a family was $48,904. Males had a median income of $40,000 versus $25,812 for females. The per capita income for the township was $20,857. About 9.3% of families and 11.1% of the population were below the poverty line, including 15.5% of those under age 18 and 9.2% of those age 65 or over.
