= Essexville, Michigan =

- City
- City of Essexville
- Motto: "Gateway to the Saginaw Bay"
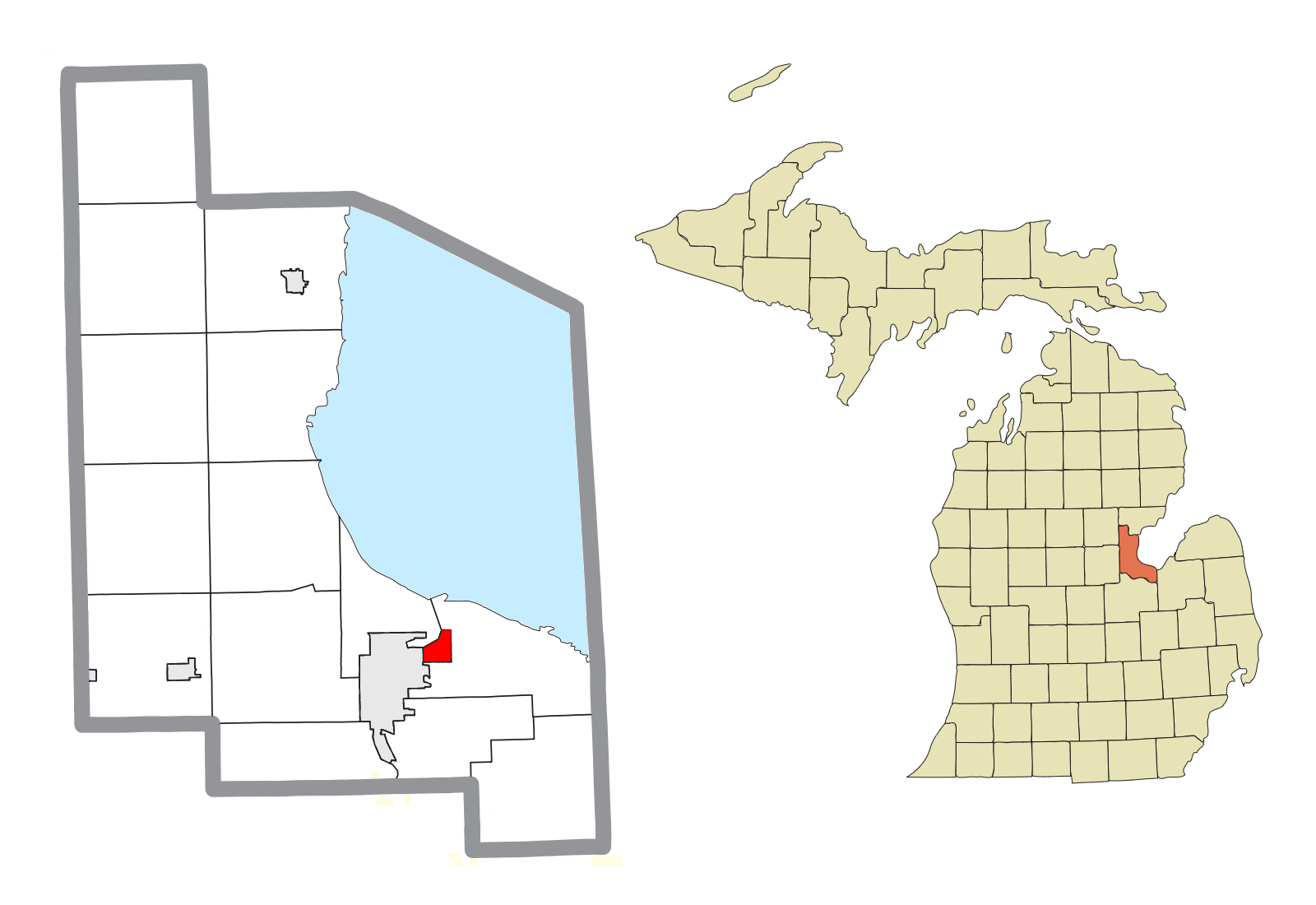
- Location within Bay County

- Location within the state of Michigan
- Coordinates: 43°36′41″N 83°50′37″W
- Country: United States
- State: Michigan
- County: Bay
- Platted: 1867
- Incorporated: 1883 (village); 1934 (city)

Government
  - Type: Council–manager
  - Mayor: Scott Wittbrodt

Area
  - Total: 1.40 sq mi (3.63 km^{2})
  - Land: 1.29 sq mi (3.35 km^{2})
  - Water: 0.11 sq mi (0.28 km^{2})
- Elevation: 584 ft (178 m)

Population (2020)
  - Total: 3,379
  - Density: 2,609.4/sq mi (1,007.49/km^{2})
- Time zone: UTC-5 (Eastern (EST))
  - Summer (DST): UTC-4 (EDT)
- ZIP code(s): 48732
- Area code: 989
- FIPS code: 26-26420
- GNIS feature ID: 0625647
- Website: Official website

Essexville is a city in Bay County in the U.S. state of Michigan. The population was 3,379 at the 2020 census. Located along the Saginaw River, Essexville is part of the Saginaw, Midland, and Bay City metropolitan area.

== History ==
Essexville is named after Ransom P. Essex, a local settler. It was first platted in 1867. The Essexville Post Office opened on Feb 27, 1871. The Post Office was closed from January 20 to February 24, 1879. It was incorporated as a village in 1883 within Hampton Township and as a city in 1934.

== Geography ==
According to the United States Census Bureau, the city has a total area of 1.41 square miles (3.65 km^{2}), of which 1.30 square miles (3.37 km^{2}) is land and 0.11 square miles (0.28 km^{2}) is water. It is also directly on the Saginaw River.

== Demographics ==
Historical population
| Census | Pop. | Note | %± |
|---|---|---|---|
| 1890 | 1,545 | | — |
| 1900 | 1,639 | | 6.1% |
| 1910 | 1,477 | | −9.9% |
| 1920 | 1,538 | | 4.1% |
| 1930 | 1,864 | | 21.2% |
| 1940 | 2,390 | | 28.2% |
| 1950 | 3,167 | | 32.5% |
| 1960 | 4,590 | | 44.9% |
| 1970 | 4,990 | | 8.7% |
| 1980 | 4,378 | | −12.3% |
| 1990 | 4,088 | | −6.6% |
| 2000 | 3,766 | | −7.9% |
| 2010 | 3,478 | | −7.6% |
| 2020 | 3,379 | | −2.8% |
U.S. Decennial Census

=== 2020 census ===
As of the 2020 census, Essexville had a population of 3,379. The median age was 42.5 years. 21.3% of residents were under the age of 18 and 20.4% of residents were 65 years of age or older. For every 100 females there were 95.0 males, and for every 100 females age 18 and over there were 90.6 males age 18 and over.

100.0% of residents lived in urban areas, while 0.0% lived in rural areas.

There were 1,431 households in Essexville, of which 28.4% had children under the age of 18 living in them. Of all households, 47.1% were married-couple households, 16.9% were households with a male householder and no spouse or partner present, and 27.9% were households with a female householder and no spouse or partner present. About 29.5% of all households were made up of individuals and 15.8% had someone living alone who was 65 years of age or older.

There were 1,528 housing units, of which 6.3% were vacant. The homeowner vacancy rate was 1.1% and the rental vacancy rate was 9.9%.

Racial composition as of the 2020 census
| Race | Number | Percent |
|---|---|---|
| White | 3,075 | 91.0% |
| Black or African American | 44 | 1.3% |
| American Indian and Alaska Native | 2 | 0.1% |
| Asian | 27 | 0.8% |
| Native Hawaiian and Other Pacific Islander | 0 | 0.0% |
| Some other race | 23 | 0.7% |
| Two or more races | 208 | 6.2% |
| Hispanic or Latino (of any race) | 178 | 5.3% |

=== 2010 census ===
As of the census of 2010, there were 3,478 people, 1,437 households, and 1,016 families residing in the city. The population density was 2,675.4 inhabitants per square mile (1,033.0/km^{2}). There were 1,527 housing units at an average density of 1,174.6 per square mile (453.5/km^{2}). The racial makeup of the city was 95.5% White, 0.9% African American, 0.6% Native American, 0.8% Asian, 0.8% from other races, and 1.4% from two or more races. Hispanic or Latino of any race were 3.0% of the population.

There were 1,437 households, of which 31.0% had children under the age of 18 living with them, 54.1% were married couples living together, 11.1% had a female householder with no husband present, 5.4% had a male householder with no wife present, and 29.3% were non-families. 25.5% of all households were made up of individuals, and 11.6% had someone living alone who was 65 years of age or older. The average household size was 2.42 and the average family size was 2.87.

The median age in the city was 42.3 years. 22.8% of residents were under the age of 18; 7.1% were between the ages of 18 and 24; 23.8% were from 25 to 44; 29.8% were from 45 to 64; and 16.6% were 65 years of age or older. The gender makeup of the city was 47.6% male and 52.4% female.

=== 2000 census ===
As of the census of 2000, there were 3,766 people, 1,487 households, and 1,088 families residing in the city. The population density was 3,114.3 inhabitants per square mile (1,202.4/km^{2}). There were 1,530 housing units at an average density of 1,265.2 per square mile (488.5/km^{2}). The racial makeup of the city was 96.34% White, 0.53% African American, 0.80% Native American, 0.58% Asian, 0.61% from other races, and 1.14% from two or more races. Hispanic or Latino of any race were 2.07% of the population.

There were 1,487 households, out of which 34.2% had children under the age of 18 living with them, 60.1% were married couples living together, 10.2% had a female householder with no husband present, and 26.8% were non-families. 23.8% of all households were made up of individuals, and 13.8% had someone living alone who was 65 years of age or older. The average household size was 2.53 and the average family size was 2.98.

In the city, the population was spread out, with 25.4% under the age of 18, 6.8% from 18 to 24, 25.1% from 25 to 44, 26.3% from 45 to 64, and 16.4% who were 65 years of age or older. The median age was 40 years. For every 100 females, there were 90.4 males. For every 100 females age 18 and over, there were 85.4 males.

The median income for a household in the city was $43,750, and the median income for a family was $55,610. Males had a median income of $46,037 versus $30,417 for females. The per capita income for the city was $25,060. About 2.7% of families and 4.4% of the population were below the poverty line, including 2.7% of those under age 18 and 5.8% of those age 65 or over.

== Education ==
Public education in Essexville is provided by the Essexville-Hampton School District.

== Cultural attractions ==
Hampton Square Mall, the first shopping mall in the Bay City metro area, was located Hampton Township, just outside of Essexville. The mall closed in 2010.
