= List of New York Mets managers =

The New York Mets are a professional Major League Baseball (MLB) franchise based in New York City, New York in the borough of Queens. They play in the National League East division. In the history of the Mets, there have been 23 managers that managed a game including four interim managers. Of those managers, only Joe Torre was a player-manager (a manager who also plays for the team); Yogi Berra did play four games while he was a coach for the Mets in 1965. Gil Hodges, Roy McMillan, Bud Harrelson, Mike Cubbage, Dallas Green, Bobby Valentine and Willie Randolph all also played in MLB for the Mets prior to becoming the team's manager.

The Mets posted their franchise record for losses in their inaugural season in the league, with 120 losses in 160 games in 1962. This was the first of seven consecutive losing seasons, a season in which the winning percentage was below .500, and the most losses by a post-1900 MLB team. During this stretch from 1962 to 1968, the Mets employed four managers. Seven managers have taken the Mets to the postseason; Davey Johnson, Bobby Valentine and Terry Collins have led the team to two playoff appearances each. Johnson and Gil Hodges are the only Mets managers to win a World Series: Hodges in 1969 against the Baltimore Orioles; and Johnson in 1986 against the Boston Red Sox. Terry Collins is the longest-tenured manager in franchise history, with 1,134 games of service over 7 seasons.

The manager with the most wins and highest winning percentage over a full season or more is Johnson; his 595–417 record gives him a .588 winning percentage. Conversely, the worst winning percentage over a full season or more in franchise history is .302 by inaugural manager Casey Stengel, who posted a 175–404 record from 1962 to 1965.

Carlos Beltrán was hired as the Mets' manager after the 2019 season but he was fired from the position before managing any games due to his involvement in the Houston Astros sign stealing scandal. Luis Rojas was hired in his place as manager for the 2020 season and managed for two losing seasons; the Mets declined their option on his contract after the 2021 season. In 2022, the following manager Buck Showalter led the Mets to their first season of over 100 wins since 1988. That season, the Mets made the playoffs; however, they were eliminated in the National League Wild Card Series. After a disappointing 2023 season, Showalter announced on October 1 that he and the Mets had parted ways. On November 14, 2023, Carlos Mendoza was hired as the manager starting with the 2024 season and was fired on June 26, 2026 following a disappointing start to the 2026 season and was replaced by Andy Green as the interim manager for the rest of the season.

== Table key ==
WPct	Winning percentage: number of wins divided by number of games managed
PA	Playoff appearances: number of years this manager has led the franchise to the playoffs
PW	Playoff wins: number of wins this manager has accrued in the playoffs
PL	Playoff losses: number of losses this manager has accrued in the playoffs
WS	World Series: number of World Series victories achieved by the manager
† or ‡	Elected to the National Baseball Hall of Fame and Museum (‡ denotes induction as manager)
§	Member of the New York Mets Hall of Fame

== Managers ==
Statistics current as of October 1, 2026

#	Image	Manager	Seasons	Games	Wins	Losses	WPct	PA	PW	PL	WS	Ref
1		Casey Stengel^{‡§}	1962–1965	579	175	404	.302	—	—	—	—	
2		Wes Westrum	1965–1967	379	142	237	.375	—	—	—	—	
3		Salty Parker (Interim)	1967	11	4	7	.364	—	—	—	—	
4		Gil Hodges^{§}	1968–1971	648	339	309	.523	1	7	1	1	
5		Yogi Berra^{†}	1972–1975	588	292	296	.497	1	6	6	0	
6		Roy McMillan (Interim)	1975	53	26	27	.491	—	—	—	—	
7		Joe Frazier	1976–1977	207	101	106	.488	—	—	—	—	
8		Joe Torre^{‡}	1977–1981	706	286	420	.405	—	—	—	—	
9		George Bamberger	1982–1983	208	81	127	.389	—	—	—	—	
10		Frank Howard (Interim)	1983	116	52	64	.448	—	—	—	—	
11		Davey Johnson^{§}	1984–1990	1012	595	417	.588	2	11	9	1	
12		Bud Harrelson^{§}	1990–1991	274	145	129	.529	—	—	—	—	
13		Mike Cubbage (Interim)	1991	7	3	4	.429	—	—	—	—	
14		Jeff Torborg	1992–1993	200	85	115	.425	—	—	—	—	
15		Dallas Green	1993–1996	512	229	283	.447	—	—	—	—	
16		Bobby Valentine	1996–2002	1003	536	467	.534	2	13	11	0	
17		Art Howe	2003–2004	323	137	186	.424	—	—	—	—	
18		Willie Randolph	2005–2008	555	302	253	.544	1	6	4	0	
19		Jerry Manuel	2008–2010	417	204	213	.489	—	—	—	—	
20		Terry Collins	2011–2017	1134	551	583	.486	2	8	7	0	
21		Mickey Callaway	2018–2019	324	163	161	.503	—	—	—	—	
22		Luis Rojas	2020–2021	222	103	119	.464	—	—	—	—	
23		Buck Showalter	2022–2023	324	175	148	.542	1	1	2	–	
24		Carlos Mendoza	2024–2026	405	206	199	.509	1	7	6	—	
25		Andy Green	2026–present	81	40	41	.494	—	—	—	—	
Totals				9478	4551	4927	.480	10	52	40	2	
