= Major League Baseball 2K9 =

2009 video game

- Xbox 360 box art featuring Tim Lincecum as the cover athlete
- Developers: Visual Concepts; Wii: 2K China
- Publisher: 2K
- Series: MLB 2K
- Platforms: Windows, Xbox 360, PlayStation 2, PlayStation 3, PlayStation Portable, Wii
- Release: NA: March 3, 2009; JP: July 7, 2009
- Genre: Sports
- Modes: Single-player, multiplayer

Major League Baseball 2K9, or MLB 2K9 for short, is an MLB-licensed baseball simulation video game developed by Visual Concepts and published by 2K. The game was developed for Microsoft Windows, Xbox 360, PlayStation 2, PlayStation 3, PlayStation Portable and Wii. The game was released on March 3, 2009, to mixed-to-positive reviews.

== Gameplay ==
Tim Lincecum on the mound.

New features were implemented for Microsoft Windows, Xbox 360, and PlayStation 3 versions. Pitching had been simplified from 2K8 to "2-step pitching", with "hold and gesture", eliminating the third "Release Timing" step of 2K8, simplifying the motion while retaining the style. "Meatballs" (mistake pitches) have been removed - instead, badly released pitches will be less effective (fastballs will be straighter, curveballs will hang, and so forth.) The AI's pitch selection was also improved. (Players may elect to use the third step as an option, and users may also still use the older Precision Pitching from 2K7.) "Influence hitting" allowed users to control fly and ground balls, and bunt with improved precision. The developers added a zone hitting feature, improved hit distribution, and improved fielding realism and AI. Also added is the ability to cancel a throw and hold the ball, or pump fake during a rundown. A player can also attempt a "Quick Throw" which gets the ball to a base faster but also increases the chance of an error. Baserunning control has been simplified; a player only needs to hold down the trigger until it vibrates, for instance, then release it when ready to attempt a steal. There are also separate "Steal" and "Speed" ratings for runners.

The ballpark realism has been changed as well. Players graphically move from the dugout to the batter's box, from the bullpen to the mound, warm up by throwing around the horn, swing the bat in the on deck circle, run out to their positions, and so forth. Umpires, ball boys, and coaches will perform their actions, while fans react realistically. For example, foul balls will cause people in the crowd to jump out of their seats and try to catch the ball, however some fans that have no real chance to get the ball will make a foolish jump in the air. Stadiums will have their unique fan signatures; for example, Turner Field will have the Tomahawk Chop while Tropicana Field will have the Cow Bell. Players will react properly to such events as a walk-off home run, a no-hitter or a World Series celebration. There are also 300 new Signature Style animations. Rain delays have also been mentioned. Arguing with the umpires is not featured in the Xbox 360 version of the game or the PS3 version.

The game also had "Living Rosters", active rosters that are automatically updated when the user logs in online; players' ratings will be constantly updated, while up-to-date trades and acquisitions will be reflected in-game. Living Rosters are not active during Franchise mode, however. The game also features a revamped stat simulation engine for the Franchise mode, while players' career arcs are based on how they play rather than preset stat curves. In other words, in order for a rookie to develop, he must receive playing time - he will not develop if he sits on the bench. An entire season can be simulated in a matter of minutes. Other improvements to the Franchise mode include adding a new revamped trade simulator and over 200 individual MLB.com headlines. 2K9’s franchise mode allows for 30 user controlled teams. The mode also has added stats; for example they have included wins divided by teams' payroll.

The game has been updated with an MLB.com-licensed in-game "Virtual Director" website featuring a presentation style similar to NBA 2K9, where the user may check up on league events, trade rumors, player and team performances. The game has improved upon 2K8's Inside Edge scouting system. The game boasts a new level of CPU customization, multi-player functionality, and real player ambitions; for example, Milton Bradley can decline a contract because of lack of playing time, not for monetary considerations. Record-breaking and milestone performances, whether single game, season or career, are acknowledged with headlines and snapshots of the event. There is also a new gameplay mode, "Playoff Mode", in which the user only plays in the postseason. The PC version, like its NBA 2K9 counterpart, will not feature online play or Living Rosters. Unlike MLB 2K6, 2K9 will not feature the 2009 World Baseball Classic.

In other improvements, users can now add SFX and graphic overlays to in-game replays to create highlight reels, as well as upload the reel to 2KSports.com, while online users' performances are graphed out, displayed in chart form, and can be compared against league averages. The Topps Trading Cards system from 2K8 has been improved, while the Home Run Derby mode has also been revamped. Unlike the previous MLB titles, there are no pre-rendered cutscenes; all cutscenes are done in real-time with in-game assets.

The game also implements PlayStation 3 Trophies, while Xbox 360 Achievements are represented as trophies in-game.

The Wii, PlayStation 2, and PlayStation Portable versions are not as fully featured as on the primary platforms, but have their own platform-specific features. The Wii version takes advantage of the Wii Remote, with "Wii Remote pitching" (players use the Wii Remote to control every pitch) and "Wiimote hitting" (players use the Wii Remote and Nunchuk for hitting, allowing the player to place their hits in relation to their swing timing, swing speed and swing angle.) The PlayStation 2 allows a player to control up to 4 different franchises simultaneously, and will allow PS2 online play. The PSP version features "True to Form Fielding", featuring improved fielding control and single player control. It also has a minor league farm system, allowing AAA scouting and managing, as well as allowing the player to play full games with AAA clubs.

=== Commentators ===
Game trading screen.

MLB 2K9 has a new broadcasting team with Gary Thorne providing the play-by-play and Steve Phillips filling in the color commentary. The duo replaces Jon Miller and Joe Morgan, who had been the commentators in past 2K installments for the previous 4 years. All four personalities are regular ESPN Major League Baseball broadcasters. Fox Sports' Jeanne Zelasko and Steve Physioc remain the reporters, giving 7th inning and post game updates, as well as on-field reports.

=== Cover athlete ===
2008 NL Cy Young Award winner Tim Lincecum of the San Francisco Giants is the cover athlete for 2K9, replacing José Reyes.

== Development ==
Then-lead developer Ben Brinkman's 1UP.com log claimed that MLB 2K9 represented the final act of a planned three year development cycle for 2K's baseball series for next gen systems. He restated the "three year plan" in a January 18, 2008 podcast with Official Xbox Magazine. In both interviews, Brinkman stated that 2K9, the third game, would represent the final, most polished version of the next gen series. However, Brinkman walked away from the series after the release of MLB 2K8, handing the reins back to Visual Concepts.

The game received a day one patch on March 3, 2009, to fix a compromised franchise mode and connectivity issues. A second patch has been released for the PS3 on April 1, 2009, and for PC and Xbox 360 on April 3, 2009. The patch has addressed many issues, but most notably the AI batting aggression and the ease of home runs in online mode and certain difficulties.

== Reception ==
Reception

Aggregate scores
Aggregator	Score
GameRankings	70.00% (PC); 66.00% (PS2); 64.11% (X360); 60.00% (PSP); 59.53% (PS3); 59.30% (Wii)
Metacritic	64/100 (X360); 61/100 (PS3); 61/100 (Wii)

Review scores
Publication	Score
1Up.com	D+ (X360); D (PS3)
GameSpot	4.5/10 (X360/PS3)
GameSpy	3.5/5
GamesRadar+	7/10
IGN	6.8/10; 6.4/10 (Wii)
Official Xbox Magazine (US)	6.5/10
TeamXbox	7.1/10

The high expectations for MLB 2K9 resulted in disappointment, as 2K9 actually received worse average reviews than its derided predecessor, 2K8. GameSpot complained, "Either MLB 2K9 shipped in a half-finished state or the developers have never seen a baseball, much less thrown one around," citing bizarre gameplay and noting the game was "crammed with bugs." 1UP.com called it "...a game that tries so hard to prove that the series is progressing, but ignores fixing the issues that have plagued it for years: poor defense, sloppy animations, and catering to the home run..." IGN stated, "Major League Baseball 2K9 fixes some of the issues from the past and sets the groundwork for a great game, but there are far too many bugs to recommend." TeamXbox said that it had, "Lots of great improvements to the game's core mechanics, but the bugs will drive you insane". Official Xbox Magazine said that its "laundry list of annoying little problems is too substantial." GamesRadar called the game a "paradox", calling it "fun and accessible", but "suffers from too many gaffes that are impossible to ignore." Operation Sports noted that "...most games play out like a high-pitch summer softball league game... one of those leagues where all the players have $500 NASA engineered bats." GameSpy stated that casual fans would be attracted to the game, while "hardcore" simmers would be turned off by it.

IGN's review of the Wii version had some diametrically opposed criticism of 2K9, stating it was too easy to strike out hitters with too-precise pitching, as well as a "laughable" franchise mode that featured 1 year, $40 million salaries for players like Danys Báez and no online play despite promises for one after 2K8 was released.

== DS spin-off ==
As with 2K8, a more "baseball-lite" version of MLB 2K9 was released for the Nintendo DS called Major League Baseball 2K9 Fantasy All-Stars, which features fantasy elements such as power-ups and fantasy stadiums. The game retains similar gameplay to its predecessor.

=== Reception ===
IGN gave Major League Baseball 2K9 Fantasy All-Stars a 6.2 out of 10, deeming it a significant step up from its predecessor and citing the improvements made to pitching and touch controls as positives. IGN also criticized the stadium gimmicks, pacing, and the lack of an in-depth season or franchise mode.

== Soundtrack ==
The following songs appear in the soundtrack:

Band	Song
Boys Like Girls	On Top of the World
Cheap Trick	Hello There
Coheed and Cambria	A Favor House Atlantic
Dirty Secrets	White Lies
Europe	The Final Countdown
Hey Monday	Should've Tried Harder
Len	Steal My Sunshine
Daniel Lenz	Groovin' Now
Lit	Lipstick and Bruises
The Killers	Human
Nortec Collective	Tengo la Voz
Ted Nugent	Motor City Madhouse
Judas Priest	You've Got Another Thing Comin'
The Romantics	What I Like About You
Royal Temple	World Wide
Chris Sernel	Take It or Leave It
SR-71	Right Now
Loverboy	The Kid is Hot Tonite

== See also ==
- MLB 09: The Show
- Major League Baseball 2K8
- Major League Baseball 2K10
