= Wagler =

Wagler is a surname. Notable people with the surname include:

- Erich Wagler (1884–1951), German ichthyologist and malacologist
- Johann Georg Wagler (1800–1832), German herpetologist and ornithologist
- Keaton Wagler (born 2007), American basketball player
- Ryan Wagler (born 1990), American singer
