= MLB 2K =

Video game series

MLB 2K was a series of baseball video games that were developed by Visual Concepts and Kush Games, and published by 2K. The series was licensed by, and based on, the Major League Baseball professional baseball organization. It was a successor to the World Series Baseball games, which were published by Sega.

In 2014, 2K announced that the series had been discontinued, following the release of MLB 2K13.

== 2005 ==
The first edition of the series, and the only game to feature the ESPN branding. The game included Web Gems instant replays, K-Zone pitching, Slam Zone hitting, and baserunner mode. The game was released in late February 2005 on the PlayStation 2 and Xbox consoles. The cover baseball player was Yankee shortstop Derek Jeter. Later that year, World Series 2K5 was released during the 2005 MLB postseason.

In 2005, in response to EA Sports' exclusive license with the National Football League (NFL) and ESPN prohibiting any NFL 2K games for the foreseeable future, Take-Two Interactive signed an exclusive third-party licensing contract with Major League Baseball (MLB), MLBPA, and MLBAM to produce MLB games. The agreement, which runs from Spring 2006 to 2012, allows for the console manufacturers Sony, Microsoft, and Nintendo to produce MLB titles for their respective platforms, but bars third party developers such as EA Sports from continuing or developing their own MLB games.

== 2006 ==
The 2006 edition, Major League Baseball 2K6, had the ESPN presentation and trademarks removed but the commentary team of Jon Miller and Joe Morgan remained intact. The game included Inside Edge scouting, Swing Stick hitting, and Payoff Pitching. The game was released on April 3, 2006, for the PlayStation 2 and Xbox; April 10 for the Xbox 360, and April 13 for the PSP. The game was also released for the GameCube, making it the first and only MLB 2K title to ever appear on the system. The cover baseball player was once again Yankee shortstop Derek Jeter.

== 2007 ==
The 2007 edition, Major League Baseball 2K7, featured a major overhaul on the "next gen" systems, the Xbox 360 and the PlayStation 3, featuring a near-photorealistic pitcher/batter interface. For the third year in a row, Derek Jeter was the cover player. The GameCube was dropped as a platform, and the Wii version was not developed. The major leap in gameplay and graphics were largely attributed to the addition of Ben Brinkman to Kush Games; Brinkman had been the lead developer for the MVP Baseball series of games.

== 2008 ==
The 2008 edition, Major League Baseball 2K8 was available for the Xbox 360, PlayStation 2, PlayStation 3, PlayStation Portable, and, for the first time, the Wii. José Reyes was the new cover athlete, taking over for Jeter. A special version of the game was developed for the Nintendo DS called Major League Baseball 2K8 Fantasy All-Stars, which featured fantasy elements such as power-ups and fantasy stadiums.

== 2009 ==
The 2009 edition, Major League Baseball 2K9, represented the final act of a planned three-year development cycle that started with 2K7. Tim Lincecum replaced Reyes as the cover athlete and was released for the Xbox 360, PlayStation 2, PlayStation 3, PlayStation Portable, Wii, and, for the first time, Windows PC. The game changed announcers as well; MLB 2K9 replaced Jon Miller and Joe Morgan with Gary Thorne for play by play and Steve Phillips for color commentary. MLB Front Office Manager represents the first foray into sports management games for 2K Sports, as well as the second PC game, after NBA 2K9. Major League Baseball 2K9 Fantasy All-Stars was the second in the series for the Nintendo DS.

== 2010 ==
Major League Baseball 2K10, like its counterpart NBA 2K10, is being feted over its 10th anniversary, and was released for Microsoft Windows, Xbox 360, PlayStation 2, PlayStation 3, PlayStation Portable, Nintendo DS, and Wii. Evan Longoria replaced Tim Lincecum as the new cover athlete.

== 2011 ==
Major League Baseball 2K11 was released for Microsoft Windows, Xbox 360, PlayStation 2, PlayStation 3, PlayStation Portable, Wii, and Nintendo DS. Roy Halladay replaced Evan Longoria as the cover athlete.

== 2012 ==
Major League Baseball 2K12 was announced after the release of NBA 2K12. The game was released on March 6, 2012. It was released on the Xbox 360, PlayStation 2, PlayStation 3, Windows PC, PlayStation Portable, Wii, and Nintendo DS. It was the last MLB 2K game to be released for the PlayStation 2, like NBA 2K12 was the last 'NBA 2K for the system.

Justin Verlander replaced Roy Halladay as the cover athlete. The game was slightly criticized for a copy and paste with a roster update but MLB 2K12 did improve on graphics. For PS2 users it took a step backwards and looked similar to 2K6. 2K12 was the last planned game under the exclusive licensing agreement and in a last-minute decision, they renewed their license with MLB to make a 2013 Game.

== 2013 ==
Featured on the 2K13 cover is David Price of the Tampa Bay Rays replacing Justin Verlander. The game is almost the same as 2K12, but with some online features missing and updated rosters. However, the game was not received well due to the lack of new features and the removal of league play. This was eventually the last game in the series.

In May 2013, Nexon launched an online spinoff version of MLB 2K named Pro Baseball 2K (Korean: 프로야구 2K) exclusively in South Korea, however the game's servers were shut down in 2014, making it unplayable. In December 2013, 2K Sports said that they will only focus on NBA and WWE Games for now on and have no further plans to make any more MLB Games.

== Cover athlete ==
List of standard cover athletes
Game	Cover star	
Game	Name	Team
MLB 2K5	Derek Jeter	New York Yankees
MLB 2K6	Derek Jeter	New York Yankees
MLB 2K7	Derek Jeter	New York Yankees
MLB 2K8	José Reyes	New York Mets
MLB 2K9	Tim Lincecum	San Francisco Giants
MLB 2K10	Evan Longoria	Tampa Bay Rays
MLB 2K11	Roy Halladay	Philadelphia Phillies
MLB 2K12	Justin Verlander	Detroit Tigers
MLB 2K13	David Price	Tampa Bay Rays
