= 2K12 (disambiguation) =

2K12 may refer to:

- the year 2012
- 2K12 Kub, Soviet air defense system
- Major League Baseball 2K12, 2012 video game
- NBA 2K12, 2011 video game
