= Major League Baseball 2K7 =

2007 video game

- North American Xbox 360 box art, featuring Derek Jeter
- Developer: Kush Games
- Publisher: 2K
- Series: MLB 2K
- Platforms: PlayStation 2, PlayStation 3, PlayStation Portable, Xbox, Xbox 360, Game Boy Advance, Nintendo DS
- Release: PS2, PS3, PSP, Xbox, Xbox 360: NA: February 27, 2007; Game Boy Advance, Nintendo DS: NA: March 19, 2007
- Genre: Sports (baseball)
- Modes: Single player, multiplayer

Major League Baseball 2K7 (or MLB 2K7) is a 2007 baseball video game developed by Kush Games and published by 2K. Released on February 27, 2007, it is the only Major League Baseball-licensed game for the Xbox and Xbox 360 based on the 2007 MLB season. It is also available for the PlayStation Portable, the PlayStation 2 and, for the first time, the PlayStation 3, though its competition came in the form of MLB 07: The Show from Sony Computer Entertainment. Portable versions for the Game Boy Advance, Nintendo DS, and PlayStation Portable were released. It is the first baseball game to be released for the Nintendo DS and the last major release for the original Xbox console.

For the third year in a row, Derek Jeter is the cover athlete, and ESPN baseball broadcasters Jon Miller and Joe Morgan serve as announcers, despite the loss of the ESPN license to Electronic Arts (EA) in 2005. Steve Physioc and Jeanne Zelasko cover the pre-game.

== History ==
According to lead developer Ben Brinkman, MLB 2K7 was to be skipped as a Wii title; the first game for the Wii would be MLB 2K8. MLB 2K7 was officially announced as gold on February 23, 2007 and was shipped on February 26; its previous release date had been advertised as March 5. This was presumably to prevent early adoption of MLB 07: The Show on Sony platforms. However, the GBA and DS versions were conspicuously absent from the announcement. The reported release date for those handhelds was March 19, 2007. It differed considerably from its 2006 release of MLB 2K6.

A demo was released on Xbox Live Marketplace for Xbox 360 owners on February 26, 2007, allowing them to play Game 7 of the 2006 National League Championship Series starting in the 7th inning.

The game and the demo of the game for the Xbox 360 and all other game formats were only available in North America and Japan with no plans to release the game in the Europe for PAL systems.

== Gameplay ==
The new iteration featured a lifelike batter/pitcher interface on seventh generation console systems, as well as more detailed models and AI tweaks. Last year's "Inside Edge" also returns, with a tweak in that playing to a player's strengths causes a boost in ability.

Other new features, as published by 2K Sports, included:

- Signature Style: In a GameSpot interview, it was revealed the game would feature 150 major league players' tendencies and animations that mimic the real-life stars. According to former MVP Baseball and current 2K Sports Major League Baseball series developer Ben Brinkman, "nearly all of [the] player faces have been redone from the ground-up using scanned data."
- True Fielding: Fielder positioning, relay and cutoff A.I. are redesigned to allow for better, more authentic Major League defensive play. Defensive alignments are now based on who is at the plate. Rundowns are revamped as well.
- Dynamic Throwing System: A new implementation of responsive throwing mechanics coupled with unique animations for infield, outfield and situational throws.
- Franchise Finance: A revised, beefier franchise mode including team news, attendance, ticket prices and fan "buzz".
- 2K Sports Online Play: Online leagues and tournaments are implemented. The Xbox 360 version will feature full 30 man leagues, while the PlayStation 3 version will support only 12, though the developers claimed they would try to increase the maximum number.
- Online Franchise: Play with up to four of your friends in a franchise or season.

Other additions included a ramped up player and manager ejection system, including a minigame in which the player controlling the manager will tap a button to argue with the umpire; in multiplayer, the opponent will take control of the umpire and try to precision tap a button to eject the opponent's manager. A managerial ejection will cause the player's team to be controlled by the CPU. Umpires also have their own personalities and AI, meaning each umpire will have a unique style of calling a game. An important feature is the use of the joystick's force feedback during same-machine multiplayer - as the invisible icon reaches the edges of the strike zone, the rumble will increase. (PlayStation 3 owners are not able to enjoy this feature due to the lack of such a feature in the gamepad.) Other minor touches include ball boys retrieving baseballs, fans catching foul balls, and dynamic bullpen activity. The PS2 features are tuned fielding, improved baseruning, 2K sports online play, and Inside Edge.

== Downloadable content ==
On June 28, 2007, the Xbox 360 version received an online update, and announced that a line of classic stadiums would be appearing on Xbox Live Marketplace, starting with Olympic Stadium for free. MLB 2K7 owners have reported in dedicated forums that the update created a save game glitch on their system. This glitch has not been acknowledged nor addressed by the publishers or developers of the game, although players have independently confirmed downloading Olympic Stadium will fix this glitch. Also it adds players who were not in the original roster such as Alex Gordon and Daisuke Matsuzaka, who had signed with the Boston Red Sox, after the game was made.

On July 9, 2007, four packages were made available:

- Sportsman’s Park, Forbes Field, Griffith Stadium, Shibe Park, Polo Grounds, and Crosley Field.
- The other three packages offered 2 of each of the above stadiums.

== Reception ==
Reception

Aggregate score
Aggregator	Score
Metacritic	(PS2) 71/100 (XBOX) 71/100 (PS3) 74/100 (X360) 79/100 (PSP) 61/100

Review scores
Publication	Score
GameRevolution	(PS3/X360) 6/10
GameSpot	(GBA) 3.3/10 (DS) 2.5/10 (PS2) 6.7/10 (XBOX) 6.8/10 (PS3) 7.4/10 (X360) 7.8/10 (PSP) 7.3/10
GameSpy	(PS3) 3.5/5 (X360) 4/5
GamesRadar+	(XBOX) 4/5 (PS3/X360) 4.5/5 (PSP) 3/5
GameZone	(PS3) 7.3/10 (X360) 7.8/10
IGN	(DS) 3/10 (PS2/XBOX) 7/10 (PS3/X360) 7.4/10 (PSP) 5.9/10

The seventh generation console versions of the game were released to generally positive reviews. The Xbox 360 version was received more positively due to better technical performance. The March 2007 issue of Game Informer awarded the game an 8.5/10 score for the Xbox 360 and PlayStation 3. The Xbox 360 version of the game received ratings of 7.9/10 from IGN, a B from 1UP, and an 8.4/10 from Team Xbox. IGN's score for the PlayStation 3 version was lower (7.5/10).

Of the sixth generation console versions, IGN awarded both the Xbox and PlayStation 2 versions a 7.0/10. However, IGN strongly criticized the current generation versions for having too many bugs, unimproved player models, incorrect commentary, and most of all, extremely illogical player ratings. GameSpot gave the Xbox version a 6.8 while giving the PS2 version a 6.7 due to the Xbox version supporting progressive scan.

The handheld versions received negative reviews due to shallow gameplay. GameSpot stated in its 2.5/10 review of the DS version that it "lacks basic features every sports game should have." The PSP version fared better, averaging a 58% score at GameRankings, but most reviews unfavorably compared it to the PSP version of Sony's MLB 07: The Show. GameSpot awarded the game a 7.3/10, stating "MLB 2K7 is packed with content and solid gameplay."
