= 2K13 =

2K13 may refer to:

- the year 2013
- Major League Baseball 2K13, 2013 video game
- NBA 2K13, 2012 video game
