= Major League Baseball 2K8 =

2008 video game

- The cover of MLB 2K8 for the Xbox 360 featuring José Reyes.
- Developers: Blue Castle Games (PS3, Xbox 360); 2K Los Angeles; 2K China (Wii)
- Publisher: 2K Sports
- Series: MLB 2K
- Platforms: PlayStation 2, PlayStation 3, PlayStation Portable, Wii, Xbox 360
- Release: NA: March 4, 2008
- Genre: Sports
- Modes: Single player, multiplayer

Major League Baseball 2K8, or, in shorter terms, MLB 2K8, is an MLB licensed baseball simulation video game co-developed by Blue Castle Games (PS3 and Xbox 360 versions only) and newly renamed 2K Los Angeles (the PS2, PSP and Wii versions are solely developed by 2K Los Angeles with 2K China co-assisting with the Wii version) and published by 2K Sports for the PlayStation 2, PlayStation 3, PlayStation Portable, Wii, and Xbox 360. It was released on March 4, 2008. A demo was released on Xbox Live Marketplace the next day on March 5 for Canada, United States, and Asian markets and features the 2007 World Series opponents.

== New features ==
Ben Brinkman, in a January 18, 2008 KOXM podcast, revealed the following new features to debut in 2K8:

- 90 playable real-life minor league baseball teams and players (restricted to players who have had major league experience), including 20 authentic minor league stadiums.
- 2K Cards, unlockable trading cards.
- New pitching system in which the pitch type is determined by analog stick movement
- Swing Stick 2.0, a revamped analog batting system which allows an increased variety of batted balls (Baltimore chops, bloops, dribblers, etc.).
- New ball-throwing system which is also determined by analog stick movement.
- More realistic fielding tweaks, and a revamp of double play animation and gameplay.

The official site also included these additional new and updated features:

- Downloadable minor league stadiums
- Revamped baserunning, with more intuitive controls and smarter baserunning AI
- Additional Signature Style animations
- Downloadable content (Xbox 360)
- The new features are not available on the PS2 version of the game. As it's a reskined Major League Baseball 2K6 with new rosters
- Some Wii version discs have a glitch in franchise mode. After the first year, the season is only 15 games. This only happens to a few discs, and can be fixed by creating another franchise each time you load the original franchise.

== Cover athlete ==
Then-New York Mets shortstop José Reyes was announced as the cover athlete on December 6, 2007, taking over for New York Yankees counterpart Derek Jeter from the previous three games.

== Announcers ==
For the 4th straight and final year, announcers Jon Miller and Joe Morgan once again resume game announcing duties, while Steve Physioc and Jeanne Zelasko continue reporting duties.

== Downloadable content ==
- March 6, 2008: The first round of downloadable content was released on Xbox Live Marketplace for free, which included The Minor League Stadium Pack, which featured Durham Bulls Athletic Park, Hadlock Field and Legends Field (now called George M. Steinbrenner Field), a Majestic Cool Base Uniforms pack, which added one new uniform for each Major League team, and the Card Series 2 download which unlocked the next set of packs for use in the game's card battle mode.

== Licensing issues ==
Barry Bonds is once again not placed in the game due to his not being a part of the MLBPA licensing agreement, and once again is represented by left-fielder Joe Young, whose name is a reference to Hall of-Fame 49ers quarterbacks Steve Young and Joe Montana. Some people have also said that Randy Carter is representing Roger Clemens on the free agents list.

The game is also notably missing some regular every day MLB players like Kevin Millar and Brendan Donnelly. This is due to the players' involvement in crossing picket lines as replacement players during the 1994 work stoppage, which prevents them from becoming members of the MLB Players Association. These players do, however, have aliases within the game. For example, Kevin Millar goes by the name Kyle Morgan as evidenced by their identical profiles including number, height, weight and attributes. Higher profile prospects like Jay Bruce (replaced with James Bale) of the Reds, Evan Longoria (replaced with Eric Lincoln) of the Rays, Colby Rasmus (replaced with Clint Rents) of the Cardinals or Fernando Martínez (replaced with Felipe Marrero) of the Mets are also under aliases in the game until they have major league experience while players like Geovany Soto of the Cubs are in the game. These aliases use the same first initials of the player's first and last names, and mirror the players actual profiles and attributes as well. New rookies from the Japan Leagues, Kosuke Fukudome of the Chicago Cubs and Hiroki Kuroda of the Los Angeles Dodgers do not have their names in the game and are instead replaced with Kazuhito Fortunato and Hideo Kajita. Toronto Blue Jays pitcher Kyle Drabek, is replaced with the name Kirk Darby, although at the time, he was on the Philadelphia Phillies.

== DS spin-off ==
A more "baseball-lite" version of MLB 2K8 was released for the Nintendo DS called Major League Baseball 2K8 Fantasy All-Stars, which extensively utilizes the DS touchscreen, and features fantasy elements such as power-ups and fantasy stadiums.

== Development and history ==
Typical gameplay screenshot.

MLB 2K8 represents the third seventh generation console baseball game of the 2K Sports Major League Baseball series, and the second lead developed by Ben Brinkman for 2K Los Angeles. In Brinkman's 1UP.com log, he revealed that MLB 2K8 represents the middle act of a planned three year development cycle for 2K's baseball series for next gen systems, with MLB 2K7 being the first stage. According to Brinkman, "At the same time we set out a three year plan for the MLB franchise so that once 2K7 ended we could get right to work on 2K8 and have a set of goals and features to accomplish." From an interview in an IGN article, "MLB 2K7 was the first step in a long process of reinventing the 2K Sports baseball brand and the MLB franchise. 2K7 was year one of that, and a lot of that was just getting back onto stable ground -- getting back with the people who play our game and putting something out there that they're happy with, they have a blast playing and that they can play for an extended period of time. I think we delivered upon that, especially given the short timeline with which we had to create that game."

== Soundtrack ==
The following songs appear in the soundtrack:

Band	Song
Battles	"Atlas"
Black Rebel Motorcycle Club	"Need Some Air"
Blitzen Trapper	"Wild Mountain Nation"
The Cars	"Moving in Stereo"
The Cool Kids"	"88
The Cure	"Never Enough"
Dinosaur Jr	"Almost Ready"
The Flaming Lips	"The W.A.N.D. (The Will Always Negates Defeat)"
The Hold Steady	"Stuck Between Stations"
Jay Reatard	"My Shadow"
Kasabian	"Reason Is Treason"
LCD Soundsystem	"Watch the Tapes"
Modest Mouse	"Dashboard"
Peter Bjorn and John	"The Chills"
The Presidents of the United States of America	"Cleveland Rocks"
The Revolution Fox Experiment	"Hyper Charlie"
The Strokes	"Someday"

== Reception ==
Reception

Aggregate score
Aggregator	Score				
Aggregator	PS2	PS3	PSP	Wii	Xbox 360
Metacritic	80/100	67/100	63/100	63/100	70/100

Review scores
Publication	Score				
Publication	PS2	PS3	PSP	Wii	Xbox 360
1Up.com	N/A	B	N/A	C	B
Destructoid	N/A	5/10	N/A	N/A	N/A
Famitsu	N/A	N/A	N/A	N/A	23/40
Game Informer	N/A	8.5/10	N/A	6.75/10	8.5/10
GameRevolution	N/A	C	N/A	N/A	C
GameSpot	N/A	6.5/10	N/A	N/A	6.5/10
GameSpy	N/A	2/5	N/A	3.5/5	2.5/5
GameTrailers	N/A	7.4/10	N/A	N/A	7.4/10
GameZone	N/A	7/10	6.5/10	7/10	6.8/10
IGN	7/10	7.2/10	6.9/10	6.5/10	7.4/10
Nintendo Power	N/A	N/A	N/A	6.5/10	N/A
Official Xbox Magazine (US)	N/A	N/A	N/A	N/A	6/10
PlayStation: The Official Magazine	N/A	3/5	N/A	N/A	N/A
Maxim	N/A	6/10	N/A	N/A	6/10
USA Today	N/A	7/10	N/A	N/A	7/10

The PlayStation 2 version received "generally favorable reviews", while the rest of the console versions received "mixed or average reviews", according to the review aggregation website Metacritic. In Japan, where the PS2 and PS3 versions were ported and published by Bethesda Softworks on November 13, 2008, followed by the Xbox 360 version on November 27, Famitsu gave the Xbox 360 version a score of three sixes and one five.

411Mania gave the Xbox 360 version a score of 7.7 out of 10 and said, "2K needs to step things up next year, there's no doubt about that, but they're on the right track judging by the year-to-year improvements. Stomp out the bugs and glitches, get the framerate under control, spruce up the graphics, and update the commentary and maybe it'll be a serious challenge for The Show next time around. If you're a baseball nut with an Xbox 360, this is the only game in town and definitely worth a look. If you've got a PS3 though, MLB 2K8 probably isn't winning the pennant." USA Today gave the PS3 and Xbox 360 versions a score of seven out of ten and stated that the game "boasts enough control innovation to merit an upgrade over last year's installment, but bugs in future releases could mean a trip to the bench." However, Maxim gave the same two console versions six out of ten and said, "Like the Yankees, 2K8 has all the necessary ingredients to be a champion—great graphics, an eclectic soundtrack, a winning tradition—and yet, in the end, all the parts wind up feeling like they're trying too hard to be great. Like that Choker McA-Rod, the game grounds out in the bottom of the ninth with the bases loaded."

== See also ==
- Major League Baseball 2K8 Fantasy All-Stars
- MLB 08: The Show
