= Major League Baseball 2K11 =

2011 video game

- Cover art featuring Roy Halladay
- Developers: Visual Concepts; Wii: 2K China
- Publisher: 2K
- Series: MLB 2K
- Platforms: Xbox 360, PlayStation 2, PlayStation 3, PlayStation Portable, Wii, Nintendo DS, Windows
- Release: NA: March 8, 2011; EU: June 24, 2011 (PS3, X360)
- Genre: Sports (baseball)
- Modes: Single-player, Multiplayer

Major League Baseball 2K11 or, in short, MLB 2K11, is an MLB licensed baseball simulation video game published by 2K. MLB 2K11 is available for Microsoft Windows, Xbox 360, PlayStation 2, PlayStation 3, PlayStation Portable, Nintendo DS, and Wii.

== Commentators ==
The commentary is delivered by the trio of Steve Phillips, Gary Thorne, and John Kruk. Kruk is absent in the Wii version.

== Cover athlete ==
Roy Halladay of the Philadelphia Phillies is the cover athlete of the game replacing Gold Glove Award winner Evan Longoria from MLB 2K10.

== New features ==
=== PC, Xbox 360, PlayStation 3 ===
The "main" version of MLB 2K11 retains the features of Major League Baseball 2K10 but adds new content. Some of the new features include the Dynamic Player Rating System (DPRS), which updates a players ability with the last four weeks of a real player's activity, which will include slumps and hot streaks. The DPRS will only affect hitting and pitching; it will not affect a player's fielding ability. There will be no option to play without the DRPS turned on, however, the DPRS does not affect trades, due to the DPRS being a short term value. Franchise modes will reflect player values based on franchise stats, not real life. The My Player career mode has similarly been improved and tweaked.

The umpires will now have a more random strike zone, while pitch ratings affect ability to locate pitches. The game will feature more AI gameplay sliders than any MLB 2K game before, and for the first time, tweaking sliders will not affect achievements. Poor fielders will be "locked out" of good animations, and the fielding rating will affect how close to the ball the fielder must be to reach it. Base stealing has been revamped, and will take into account many variables such as the speed of the runner, type of pitch, lead, and the catcher's arm.

=== Wii ===
The Wii version has its own unique features, including the Mini-Diamond, a new multiplayer mode set in fantasy venues, such as a low gravity Space ballpark to a Circus environment, while the Total Control Pitching and Hitting feature utilizes the Wii Remote and Nunchuk. The Wii version also retains the Franchise, Tournament and Home Run Derby modes of the main version. There is no "My Player" or "MLB Today" career mode for the Wii.

=== PlayStation 2, PlayStation Portable ===
The PlayStation 2 and PlayStation Portable versions are less feature-rich than the main version as they are reskins of Major League Baseball 2K6, but they still feature Franchise and Season play, the Home Run Derby and a unique Manager Showdown feature in which a player sets up a lineup and a starting pitcher and plays the game strictly from the manager's role as strategist. The PSP version adds The Farm, which allows the player to engage in Minor League Baseball games.

=== Nintendo DS ===
The Nintendo DS version features both a Season Mode and a Postseason Mode, as well as utilizing the touch screen for the Total Control Pitching and Hitting Feature. The game also features 250 collectible virtual trading cards.

== Promotion ==
In January, game publisher 2K Sports announced that they would continue a contest from the previous year. Players had a chance to win $1,000,000 for pitching a perfect game on the Xbox 360 or PS3 versions of the game. The contest began on April 1, 2011. This caused controversy as former WWE wrestler Stevie Richards had done this before and tried to claim the million dollars for the perfect game he had pitched but had done it before the contest officially began. Brian Kingrey, a music teacher from Hammond, Louisiana, claimed the prize by throwing a perfect game with Roy Halladay within two hours of the start of the contest.

== Reception ==
Reception

Aggregate scores
Aggregator	Score
GameRankings	70% (PS3); 69% (X360)
Metacritic	74/100 (PC); 72/100 (PS3); 69/100 (X360)

Review scores
Publication	Score
Game Informer	6/10
GameSpot	7.5/10
GamesRadar+	3.5/5 stars
GameTrailers	6.9/10
GameZone	7/10
IGN	7/10

Reception for the game has been mixed. IGN rated both the Xbox 360 and PlayStation 3 versions with a 7.0 while the readers favored the 360 version of the game over the PS3 ranging from a 7.3 out of 10 for the 360 to a 6.5 out of 10 for the PS3. The 360 version of the game ran at a smoother frame rate according to most reviews. GameZone gave the game a 7/10, stating "Overall, it is still a unique baseball experience, but unfortunately, after playing it for a little while, you will want an improved product. Let's hope for something even better in 2012." GameSpot gave the game a 7.5/10, praising its online mode improvements, but criticizing its lack of significant changes from last year's version of the game.

== Soundtrack ==
1. Pearl Jam - "Rearviewmirror"
2. Shout Out Louds - "Please Please Please"
3. Joan Jett - "Bad Reputation"
4. The Willowz - "Repetition"
5. TAB the Band - "Bought and Sold"
6. Trenchtown - "Pourin' Rain"
7. Trenchtown - "Unpaid Holiday"
8. Corroded - "Come On In"
9. Five Finger Death Punch - "Hard to See"
10. The Wolfmen - "Better Days"
11. double0zero - "The Hi Hi's"
12. We Are Scientists - "You Should Learn"
13. USS - "Anti-Venom"

There is a different menu screen for the Wii versions "2K BEATS" screen.

== See also ==
- MLB 11: The Show
- Gary Thorne
- John Kruk
- Steve Phillips
- 2K Sports
