= Major League Baseball 2K8 Fantasy All-Stars =

2008 video game

- Box art featuring José Reyes
- Developer: Deep Fried Entertainment
- Publisher: 2K Sports
- Platform: Nintendo DS
- Release: NA: April 15, 2008
- Genre: Sports
- Modes: Single-player, multiplayer

Major League Baseball 2K8 Fantasy All-Stars is the Nintendo DS spin-off of Major League Baseball 2K8 in the vein of MLB Power Pros, developed by Canadian studio Deep Fried Entertainment and published by 2K Sports. It was released on April 15, 2008.

== Gameplay ==
Typical gameplay screenshot.

The game extensively utilizes the Nintendo DS touchscreen, which controls the power and technique of bat swings and the speed and accuracy of pitches. Fielding, baserunning and other controls will also utilize the DS touch screen, by dragging and tracing lines to execute those baseball actions.

The game also features the ability to obtain special "power-ups", which can increase batting, pitching and fielding skill, as well a "chicken ball" that causes the opponents to chase a decoy ball, and a "crazy ball" that causes a batted ball to take a knuckleball-like flight. Power up pitches include a "super splitter" (that splits the ball into two pieces) and a literal "fireball". Fielding power ups include a "brick wall" that instantly stops a ball and a "super jump" to catch high line drives or rob home runs.

== Features ==
Other features include:

- Exhibition mode, for quick play and scenario set ups
- Fantasy Pennant mode, a tournament mode
- 80 fictional teams
- Themed Stadiums, fantasy ballfields
- All-Star Training, a tutorial mode to teach the player how to use the touch pad with the game

== Multiplayer ==
MLB 2K8 Fantasy All-Stars supports two-player DS Wireless Play

== Cover athlete ==
As with MLB 2K8, José Reyes is the cover athlete, in cartoon form.

== Reception ==
Reception

Aggregate score
Aggregator	Score
Metacritic	59/100

Review scores
Publication	Score
Game Informer	5.5/10
GamesRadar+	3.5/5
GameZone	7.5/10
IGN	5.5/10
Nintendo Power	6.5/10

The game received "mixed or average" reviews according to the review aggregation website Metacritic.

== See also ==
- Major League Baseball 2K9 Fantasy All-Stars
- Major League Baseball 2K8
- MLB Power Pros
- MLB Stickball
- 2K Sports Major League Baseball series
