= Major League Baseball 2K12 =

2012 video game

- Cover art featuring Justin Verlander
- Developers: Visual Concepts; Wii, PS2, PSP: 2K China, Virtuos
- Publisher: 2K
- Series: 2K Sports Major League Baseball
- Platforms: PlayStation 2, PlayStation 3, PlayStation Portable, Wii, Nintendo DS, Xbox 360, Microsoft Windows, Cloud (OnLive)
- Release: March 6, 2012
- Genre: Sports (Professional baseball)
- Modes: Single-player, multiplayer

Major League Baseball 2K12 or, in short, MLB 2K12, is a Major League Baseball licensed baseball simulation video game published by 2K that was released for the PlayStation 2, PlayStation 3, PlayStation Portable, Wii, Nintendo DS, Xbox 360, and Microsoft Windows on March 6, 2012. This was the last MLB game to be released for the PlayStation 2, PlayStation Portable, Wii, Nintendo DS and Microsoft Windows. The commentary is delivered by the trio of Steve Phillips, Gary Thorne, and John Kruk.

== Cover athlete ==
Justin Verlander of the Detroit Tigers is the game's cover athlete replacing Roy Halladay from MLB 2K11. Verlander won both the AL Cy Young Award and the AL MVP Award in 2011.

=== Modes ===
- The Perfect Game Challenge is a competition where players will compete to pitch a perfect game in MLB 2K12.
- MLB Today Season Mode
- Franchise Mode is a mode where a player can play through multiple MLB seasons with one team, all while signing free agents, making trades, drafting players and setting rosters for that team and its minor league affiliate teams. However, it is not as in depth as MLB Today Season Mode, and more than one game may be played in a day in Franchise Mode. You can edit your players abilities in all areas unlimited times, making it possible to make your entire team perfect.

You can also edit their contract values and adjust the sliders or difficulty level during a franchise.

=== Changes from the previous installments ===
- MLB 2K12 makes pitcher and batter interactions more realistic than ever before, as certain pitches will decrease or increase in effectiveness against certain players, depending on their strengths and weaknesses.
- MLB 2K12 has a new throwing system and variation and realism in the hits.
- MLB 2K12 features improved gameplay from the previous installments, including improved AI, as well as improved graphics and lighting.
- MLB 2K12 features all of the real life MLB logos, uniforms, and ballparks.

== End of the Series ==
2K Sports gave many signals on May 22, 2012, that the game would mark the end of the MLB 2K series. The game was left off the list of games for 2K's 2013 fiscal year, which was the same way they signaled the end of the NHL 2K series (although it returned on mobile devices in 2014) and the College Hoops series. A spokesman for Take Two commented, "Our legacy Major League Baseball agreement will sunset in fiscal 2013. MLB 2K12 is our last offering under that agreement. At this time, we have no further comment."

However, on January 9, 2013, 2K Sports eventually announced that they had reached an agreement with Major League Baseball, the Major League Baseball Players Association, and Major League Baseball Advanced Media to release Major League Baseball 2K13. The game was released on March 5, 2013. MLB 2K13 was the final installment of the series.

== Soundtrack ==
The following soundtrack was confirmed on February 17, 2012.

Artist	Song
Atmosphere	Just for Show
Bass Drum of Death	Get Found
Explosions in the Sky	Trembling Hands
G-Side	Put Me in the Game
Grouplove	Colours
JEFF the Brotherhood	Shredder
My Morning Jacket	Holdin' On to Black Metal
Pretty Lights	Hot Like Dimes
Skrillex	Scary Monsters and Nice Sprites
Telekinesis	Please Ask for Help
The Cool Kids	Boomin'
The Joy Formidable	Austere
The Vaccines	If You Wanna

== Reception ==
Reception

Aggregate score
Aggregator	Score
Metacritic	(X360) 68/100 (PS3) 68/100

Review scores
Publication	Score
Destructoid	(PS3) 5/10
Game Informer	(X360) 6.75/10
GameSpot	(X360/PS3) 5.5/10
GameSpy	(PC) 1.5/5
GamesRadar+	(X360/PS3) 3/5
IGN	(X360/PS3) 7/10

Major League Baseball 2K12 received "mixed or average" reviews, according to review aggregator Metacritic.

GamesRadar wrote, "Despite its many issues, MLB 2K12 packs a significant punch when it comes to the nuts-and-bolts of big league baseball...Unfortunately, it's just too ordinary-looking and choppy-playing...For all its good points, a game of this stature should be more polished at this stage of the franchise's existence."

== See also ==
- MLB 12: The Show
