= Trenchtown (band) =

American punk rock band

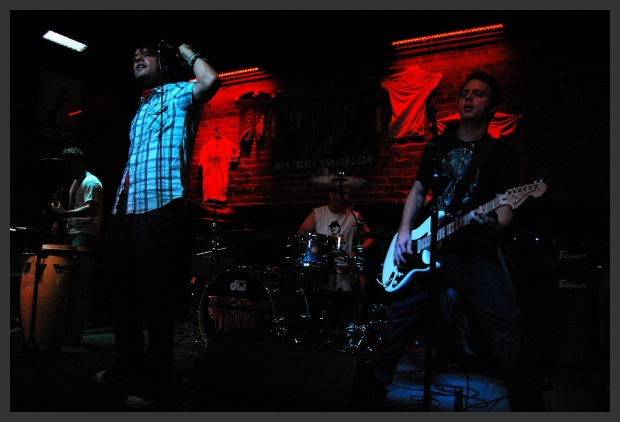
- Trenchtown in 2010, Lighthouse Cafe

Background information
- Origin: Hermosa Beach, California, United States
- Genres: Indie; Punk rock
- Years active: 1996-present
- Label: Go-DIY Records
- Members: Ryan Wagler; Mike Nichols; Eric Wagler; Mike Burlett; Greg Bo
- Website: Official Website

Trenchtown is an American five-piece punk rock band from Jerome, Michigan, United States. Formed in the fall of 1996, the group consists of Ryan Wagler (lead vocals), Eric Wagler (bass), Mike Nichols (rhythm guitar), Greg Bolenbough (lead guitar) and Mike Burlett (drums).

== History ==
Originally formed by Mike Nichols, Eric Wagler and Mike Burlett in Fall 1996, the trio released their first full-length record, "Mary-Go-Round" under the band name Maryz Eyez, while freshmen at Western Michigan University in 1999. The trio went on to play extensively throughout the West Michigan music scene. In 2002 Ryan Wagler, brother to Eric and cousin to Nichols, joined as rhythm guitarist and vocalist. Ryan Wagler purchased his guitar and amplifier on the way to his first show with the band.

As a quartet, the band traveled to Charlotte, North Carolina to record 2004's full-length "For All The Haters" with Jamie Hoover of Hooverama Studios (R.E.M., The Spongetones, Hootie and the Blowfish). In 2007, the band again traveled south to record their follow-up "Memento Mori" with Hoover. In 2008, the band uprooted and transplanted to Hermosa Beach, California. Finally in a beach town that fit the sound, and adding long-time high school pal Greg Bo on lead guitar, the band took on the moniker Trenchtown.

The band, known for combining the elements of punk, rock, reggae, metal and pop to obtain their sound, have released three full-length records and a new EP to date. Most recently, the self-titled EP, "Trenchtown", engineered and co-produced by Biohazard guitarist Billy Graziadei, has received high acclaim and credibility in underground punk rock circles from music lovers and musicians alike.

The band has been part of the Van's Warped Tour twice, and has placed two Top Five songs on XM Radio Unsigned Channel. At a recent show in Long Beach, California, Trenchtown opened for punk rock greats Unwritten Law and Death By Stereo. Other popular artists Trenchtown have shared the stage with include Seether, the Dead Kennedys, The Plain White T's, Lucky Boys Confusion, Sponge, Seven Mary Three, Cracker, Authority Zero, The Matches, Local H, and ska greats Mustard Plug, to name a few.

With the release of their self-titled EP in 2010, Trenchtown has also secured a sponsorship deal with Best Buy endorsing the band as a "Best Buy Band”.

In October 2011, the band was selected to be part of the Taco Bell Feed The Beat, a program providing touring music artists with Taco Bell Bucks while on the road along with artists such as Andrew W.K., Gym Class Heroes, and Set Your Goals (band).

In support of the album "Against The Sun", Trenchtown embarked on a Fall 2011 nationwide tour with punk rock band Authority Zero culminating at the House of Blues in Anaheim, California.

Trenchtown appeared on nationally broadcast, Chicago, Illinois music television show JBTV in November 2011 to debut their music video for "Waves" and interview with show creator Jerry Bryant.

In March 2012, Trenchtown was named an Armed Forces Entertainment Featured Performer and chosen to tour Military bases on the island of Diego Garcia, located in the Indian Ocean through Independence Day (United States) 2012.

== Media ==
Trenchtown's "Unpaid Holiday" and "Pourin Rain" are featured as part of the soundtrack to MLB2K11 released on March 8, 2011. Trenchtown was the only band to receive multiple tracks on the game (2 of the 13 tracks).

== Discography ==
- Mary-Go-Round (1999, Maryz Eyez, LP)
- For All The Haters (2004, Maryz Eyez, LP)
- Memento Mori (2007, Maryz Eyez, LP)
- Trenchtown (2010, Go-DIY Records, EP)
- Against The Sun (2012)

== Line-up ==
- Ryan Wagler - Lead Vocals, Keys, Accordion, Percussion
- Mike Nichols - Rhythm Guitar, Vocals
- Eric Wagler - Bass, Vocals
- Greg Bo - Lead Guitar, Vocals
- Mike Burlett - Drums
