= Gary Thorne =

American sportscaster

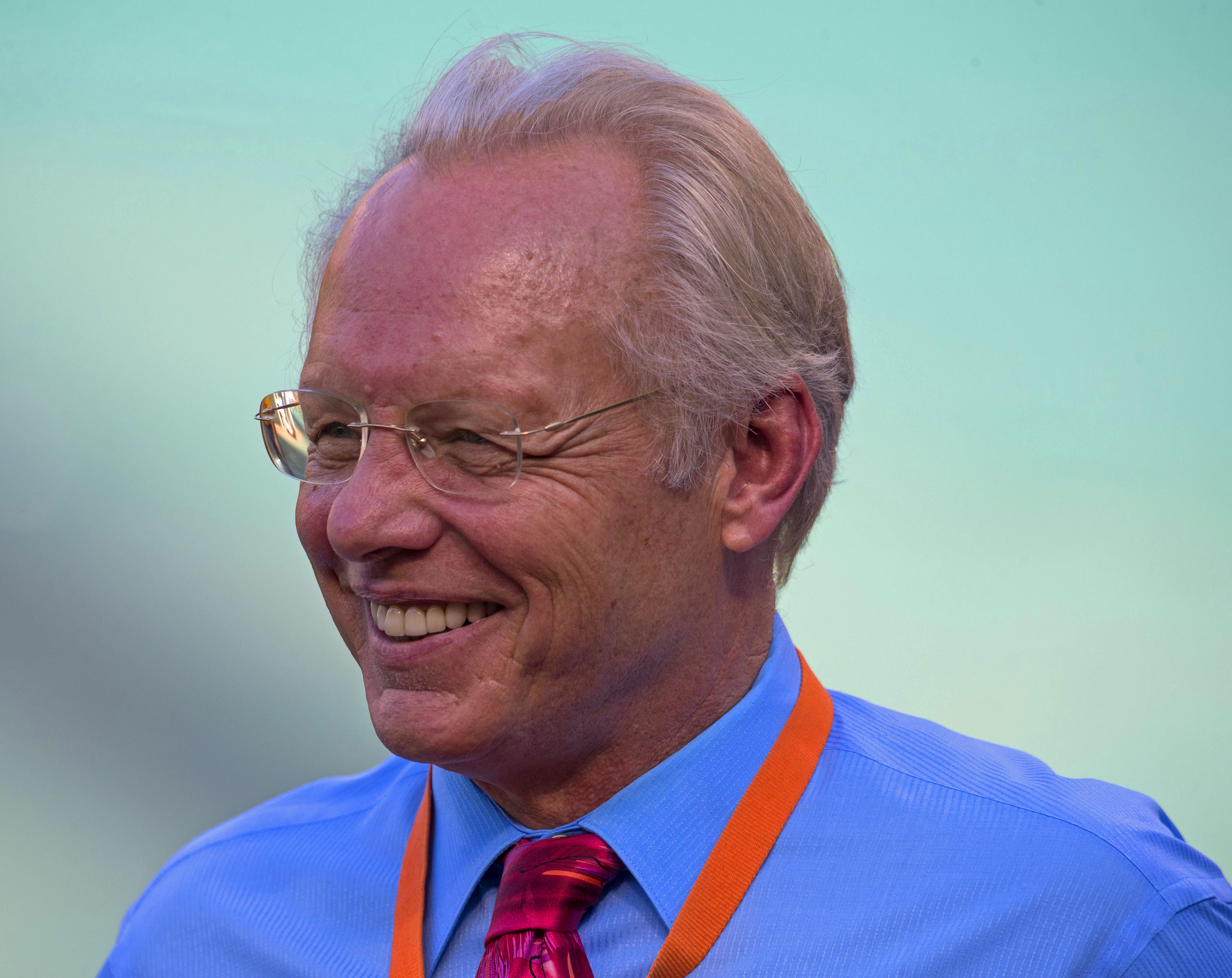
- Thorne in 2015
- Born: Gary Francis Thorne; June 9, 1948 (age 78)
- Education: University of Maine; Georgetown University
- Occupation: Sportscaster
- Years active: 1977–present

Gary Francis Thorne (born June 9, 1948) is an American sportscaster. He was the lead play-by-play announcer for Baltimore Orioles games on MASN from 2007 to 2020. He has also worked for ESPN and ABC, including National Hockey League, Major League Baseball, college football, and the Frozen Four hockey tournament. He also worked for World Wrestling Entertainment (WWE), where he was the narrator for the WrestleMania Rewind program on its WWE Network streaming video service.

== Early life ==
Thorne grew up in Old Town, Maine, graduating from Old Town High School in 1966. After graduating from the University of Maine in 1970, University of Maine School of Law in 1973, and Georgetown Law School in 1976 (while paying tuition as a sportscaster/disc jockey), Thorne became Penobscot County assistant district attorney. He also joined the bar of the U.S. Supreme Court.

== Broadcasting career ==
=== Baseball ===
In 1985, Thorne began a four-year stint as a radio announcer for the New York Mets. He was present in the booth at Shea Stadium, along with Bob Murphy, for the sixth game of the 1986 World Series between the Mets and Boston Red Sox.

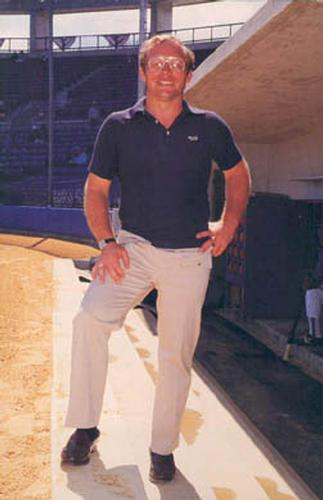
Thorne c. 1988

Thorne served as the TV play-by-play announcer for the Mid-Atlantic Sports Network's Baltimore Orioles games from 2007 to 2019. He is known for his signature calls of "Goodbye! Home run!" and "Mercy!" Thorne closed his Orioles broadcasts with "Adieu" if the Orioles lost or "Adieu-Adieu" if they won.

The Orioles removed Thorne from the broadcast booth in the midst of a contract disagreement during the 2020 season, with the team invoking the right not to pick up his contract through the schedule changes brought about by COVID-19. Thorne was let go by MASN entirely on January 23, 2021.

From July 16–18, 2021, Thorne filled in for Gary Cohen on play-by-play for the SNY broadcast of the New York Mets' series against the Pittsburgh Pirates.

On September 23, 2022, Thorne filled in for Wayne Randazzo on radio for a WCBS broadcast of a game between the Mets and the Oakland Athletics.

==== National work ====
In 1989, Thorne was named a backup play-by-play announcer (behind Al Michaels and replacing Gary Bender in this particular capacity) for ABC's coverage of Thursday Night Baseball telecasts with Joe Morgan. Thorne also served as a field reporter for the World Series and covered the World Series Trophy presentation for ABC. Like his ABC Sports colleagues, Al Michaels, Jim Palmer, Tim McCarver, and Joe Morgan, Thorne was at San Francisco's Candlestick Park when the Loma Prieta earthquake hit on October 17, 1989.

In 1995, Thorne called the first two games of the American League Division Series between the New York Yankees and Seattle Mariners on NBC/The Baseball Network with Tommy Hutton.

From 1996 until 2003, Thorne served as the play-by-play man for the World Series produced by MLB International, airing in over 200 countries around the world, as well as on the American Forces Network. During this time frame, Thorne worked alongside Rick Cerone and then Ken Singleton. Thorne was on the call for MLB International when New York Mets third baseman Robin Ventura hit a "Grand Slam Single" to end Game 5 of the 1999 National League Championship Series against the Atlanta Braves after 15 innings.

Robin Ventura...the Mets win... 4-3! There will be a Game 6!

In 2008, Thorne was named the lead play-by-play announcer for ESPN Radio's Sunday Night Baseball coverage, working alongside color commentator Dave Campbell. He called a majority of the network's Sunday Night games, although occasionally other commitments would cause him to miss a broadcast, with other ESPN announcers (such as Dan Shulman, who preceded Thorne as the primary Sunday night voice) filling in for him that week. Thorne additionally worked on ESPN Radio's postseason Division Series coverage between 2007 and 2009, and (as previously mentioned) called the 2008 All-Star Game for non-U.S. viewers via MLB International television.

Thorne officially replaced Dave O'Brien on the MLB International broadcasts of the All-Star Game, ALCS (even-numbered years), NLCS (odd-numbered years), and the World Series from 2010-2014 alongside Rick Sutcliffe. Thorne and Sutcliffe were replaced in 2015 by the #2 Fox broadcast team of Matt Vasgersian and John Smoltz.

Thorne announces various games of the College World Series every year during the month of June. He also is a play-by-play TV announcer for the Little League World Series on ESPN during the month of August. Thorne is also the play-by-play announcer of the video games Major League Baseball 2K9, Major League Baseball 2K10, Major League Baseball 2K11, Major League Baseball 2K12, and Major League Baseball 2K13.

Thorne served as master of ceremonies for the National Baseball Hall of Fame's induction ceremonies from 2011-2016.

=== Hockey ===
In 1977, Thorne called hockey games for Augusta, Maine radio and television stations. Thorne rose to prominence in Maine broadcasting, when he began calling play-by-play for the University of Maine's hockey games for Bangor radio station WABI.

Thorne was asked to call Maine hockey games during winter months until 1987 (simultaneously with his work for the Mets in the summer from 1985) when the lure of doing play-by-play in the NHL became too strong for Thorne to ignore. From 1987–1993, Thorne served as the play-by-play voice of the New Jersey Devils of the NHL (before being replaced by Mike Emrick) on SportsChannel New York. Thorne missed several Mets games in the 1988 season due to Devils playoff games. He was replaced after that Mets season by Gary Cohen. Thorne spent the following season with the Chicago White Sox.

In March 2014, Thorne called several high school games in the Class AA Minnesota State High School League boys hockey tournament for local independent TV station KSTC-TV. When interviewed by The New York Times, Thorne expressed his enjoyment for being asked to announce. "It's a great event, and I thought it would be great fun. I think that's the word I used most often in the last three days, fun, because that's how I think of this. It's a wonderful event. It's great to see the kids play. It's great hockey. The talent level is extremely high. It's an event with a capital E. And it's great to be a part of it."

During the 2016–17 NHL season, Thorne called 8 NHL away games for the Los Angeles Kings, filling in for Bob Miller, who abstained from all of the Kings' longer travels east after missing the latter part of the 2015–16 season due to health issues.

==== National work ====
From 1992 to 2004, Thorne called NHL play-by-play for games on ESPN, ESPN2, and (beginning 1993 and again in 1999) ABC, including many of the latter-round playoff games. He was almost always paired with color commentator Bill Clement during these ESPN-produced telecasts. The duo were the commentators on EA Sports' NHL 07 (Xbox 360 only), NHL 08 through NHL 14, and ESPN NHL 2K5. The pair called the Stanley Cup Final for ESPN and every Stanley Cup win from 1993 through 2004, except for 1995; Mike Emrick and John Davidson were the broadcast team for the clinching game of that Finals series (which was aired on Fox). Davidson, who joined them as a third man in the booth for big games, did so for both Stanley Cup wins from 2003 through 2004. In addition, NBC enlisted Thorne to call the hockey tournament with John Davidson during the 2002 Winter Olympics in Salt Lake City.

In 2005, when ESPN dropped out of the bidding for NHL hockey games, Thorne began doing play-by-play for baseball and college football on ESPN. He also picked up duties as the lead play-by-play announcer for the Frozen Four, again paired with color commentator Bill Clement and Darren Pang. He called the end of two long-running Stanley Cup droughts, in 1994 for the New York Rangers and 1997 for the Detroit Red Wings.

Thorne was named to call the play-by-play of Team USA's games in the 2010 World Junior Ice Hockey Championships for the NHL Network alongside Dave Starman. However, shortly before the tournament started, he was replaced by JP Dellacamera for personal reasons. He returned to NHL Network in 2011 to call Team USA's games in the 2011 World Junior Ice Hockey Championships.

When ESPN/ABC regained the rights to the NHL for the 2021–22 season, many fans had pushed ESPN to bring back him and Clement for their coverage together. Thorne himself had expressed his interest in making a return to the network to call some of their games. In an interview with Richard Deitsch of The Athletic, he said "I'd love to talk to them about it." However, when the network released their entire roster in the summer, the pair were left off the roster, angering many fans.

=== Football ===
Thorne was the announcer for ABC's coverage of the Capital One Bowl for 2004 and 2005.

In 2011, Thorne joined CBS Sports Network as a play-by-play man for college football and has been paired with Randy Cross as color analyst.

=== PBA bowling ===
ESPN replaced Rob Stone the remaining (unrecorded) events for the 2011–12 season by Thorne, including Pete Weber's record-breaking fifth U.S. Open championship.

=== WWE ===
On February 25, 2014, the WWE Network debuted WrestleMania Rewind, a behind-the-scenes look at one of the matches that took place at the WWE's annual WrestleMania event. While Pat Summerall provided narration for the first episode, Thorne provides the narration for every episode beginning with episode #2 due to Summerall's death.

== Controversies ==
=== Bobby Valentine ===
In September 2002, Thorne reportedly talked of dissension in the Mets clubhouse between manager Bobby Valentine and the team's players. "There are a lot of guys down there (in the dugout) who don't like him," a New York Daily News columnist quotes Thorne as having said. "They don't like playing for him. And if there has ever been a Teflon manager, he's it. Nothing seems to stick. He's never responsible for anything."Valentine and the Mets parted ways after the 2002 season.

=== Curt Schilling ===
In April 2007, in reference to Curt Schilling's famed bloody sock during the 2004 MLB playoffs, Thorne said during a broadcast of a Red Sox–Orioles game that Boston backup catcher Doug Mirabelli admitted it was a hoax. "It was painted," Thorne said. "Doug Mirabelli confessed up to it after. It was all for PR." Thorne later said that Mirabelli had only been joking. "He said one thing, and I heard something else. I reported what I heard and what I honestly felt was said," Thorne said. "Having talked with him today, there's no doubt in my mind that's not what he said, that's not what he meant. He explained that it was in the context of the sarcasm and the jabbing that goes on in the clubhouse. "I took it as something serious, and it wasn't," Thorne said. Mirabelli confirmed the story, saying, "He knows that I believe 100 percent that I thought the sock had blood on it. It never crossed my mind that there wasn't blood on that sock. If he misinterpreted something said inside the clubhouse, it's unfortunate." Mirabelli said he spoke with Thorne in the Boston clubhouse about six months after the 2004 playoffs. "As he was walking away he asked, 'How about the bloody sock?' I said, 'Yeah, we got a lot of publicity out of that,' and that was all he can recall me saying," Mirabelli said. "He said he assumed what I meant was that the sock was fake and that it was just a publicity stunt. That by no means is what I meant. There was never a doubt in mind there was blood on the sock."

== Career timeline ==
- 1977–1986: University of Maine Hockey Play-by-Play
- 1985–1988: New York Mets Radio Play-by-Play
- 1985–1993: New Jersey Devils TV Play-by-Play
- 1988–1992: SportsChannel America's Hockey Play-by-Play
- 1989: Chicago White Sox Play-by-Play
- 1994–2002: New York Mets TV Play-by-Play
- 2003–2004: NHL 2K series in-game play-by-play announcer.
- 2006–2013: EA NHL series in-game play-by-play announcer.
- 2007–2020: Baltimore Orioles Lead Play-by-Play on MASN
- 2009–2013: MLB 2K series in-game play-by-play announcer.
- 2016: Los Angeles Kings fill-in play-by-play announcer with Fox Sports West
- 2017: World Baseball Classic Pool D Announcer
- 2021: New York Mets fill-in play-by-play announcer with SportsNet New York (SNY) and WPIX.
- 2022: New York Mets fill-in radio play-by-play announcer with Wayne Randazzo on WCBS.

=== At ESPN/ABC ===
Year	Title	Role
1988–2004	Major League Baseball on ABC	Play-by-play (secondary)
1990–1993; 1996–2000; 2003–2009	ESPN Major League Baseball	Play-by-play (secondary)
1992–2004	ESPN National Hockey Night	Play-by-Play (lead)
1993–1994; 2000–2004	NHL on ABC	Play-by-Play (lead)
2004–2006	ESPN College Football on ABC	Play-by-Play

==== ESPN Radio ====
Year	Title	Role
2008–2009	Major League Baseball on ESPN Radio	Play-by-Play (lead)

Preceded by Jim Hunter or Fred Manfra	Baltimore Orioles television play-by-play announcer 2007–2019	Succeeded by Scott Garceau, Kevin Brown or Geoff Arnold
Preceded by Jiggs McDonald	Stanley Cup Final American network television play-by-play announcer 1993–2004 (with Mike Emrick on Fox from 1995 to 1999)	Succeeded by Mike Emrick
Preceded by Gary Bender	#2 play-by-play announcer, Major League Baseball on ABC; 1989	Succeeded by Brent Musburger (in 1994)
