= MLB 2K13 =

2013 video game

- Cover featuring David Price
- Developer: Visual Concepts
- Publisher: 2K
- Series: MLB 2K
- Platforms: PlayStation 3 Xbox 360
- Release: March 5, 2013
- Genre: Sports
- Modes: Single-player, multiplayer

MLB 2K13 (sometimes called Major League Baseball 2K13) is a 2013 baseball video game developed by Visual Concepts and published by 2K for the PlayStation 3 and Xbox 360. This is the first and only MLB 2K game not to be released on the PlayStation 2, PSP, Wii, Nintendo DS and Microsoft Windows. The commentary is delivered by the trio of Gary Thorne, Steve Phillips, and John Kruk. David Price (then of the Tampa Bay Rays) is the game's cover athlete replacing Justin Verlander from MLB 2K12.

On January 6, 2014, 2K Sports announced that MLB 2K13 would be the final game in the MLB 2K series. This would be the last MLB game to be released on an Xbox console until MLB The Show 21, as Sony Interactive Entertainment would be the exclusive licensee for MLB Advanced Media, who eventually forced them to release the games on Xbox and Nintendo consoles to keep the license.

== Features ==
2K confirmed that the 7 Perfect Game Challenge will be returning, but will now have many different rules.

2K confirmed for the second straight year that there will be a 2K combo pack that includes MLB 2K13 and NBA 2K13. The NBA cover will only feature Kevin Durant of the Oklahoma City Thunder on it instead of the trio of Durant, Blake Griffin of the Los Angeles Clippers, and Derrick Rose of the Chicago Bulls. The combo pack had a retail price of $79.99; MLB 2K13 had a retail price of $59.99 and was released on March 5 along with the bundle.

There are no gameplay or game mode additions compared to MLB 2K12, and it is missing online leagues. This is most likely because 2K only had four months to make the game due to the contract expiration.

== Reception ==
Reception

Aggregate score
Aggregator	Score
Metacritic	(X360) 48/100

Review scores
Publication	Score
Game Informer	4/10
GameSpot	5/10
GamesRadar+	2.5/5
IGN	4.5/10

MLB 2K13 has received negative reviews, with most reviewers saying the addition of no new modes or game play enhancements makes the game a copy and paste of MLB 2K12. IGN called the game a "phoned-in, weak sauce embarrassment."

Game Informer wrote, "MLB 2K13 is one of the most embarrassing whiffs I’ve seen. Whether I was playing CPU or human opponents, games frequently hinged on something that shouldn’t have happened on the diamond. Only play it if you have a YouTube account dedicated to archiving video game glitches."

== See also ==
- MLB 13: The Show
- MLB 2K12
