= Ryan Wagler =

American singer (born 1990)

- Ryan Wagler performing at House Of Blues

Background information
- Born: Ryan Duane Wagler; February 8, 1990 (age 36)
- Genres: Indie, punk rock
- Occupation: Musician
- Instrument: Vocals
- Years active: 2002–present
- Member of: Trenchtown

Ryan Wagler (born February 8, 1990) is an American singer. He is the lead singer for the Hermosa Beach-based band Trenchtown.

== History ==
Sharing a mutual love for music, Ryan Wagler and his brother Eric began performing at a very young age. In 1996 Eric Wagler started the band ""Maryz Eyez"" with his cousin Mike Nichols and friend Mike Burlett. However only in 2002 Wagler joins the band as rhythm guitarist and vocals, after briefly playing with rock band "Daddy-O".

After travelling as a quartet to Charlotte, North Carolina to record 2004's full-length "For All The Haters and subsequently "Memento Mori" in 2007, the band uprooted and transplanted to Hermosa Beach, California taking on their actual name Trenchtown.

In September 2010, Ryan took part to MTV's ""Love Is Louder"" campaign launched by Hollywood actress Brittany Snow and The Jed Foundation to fight against the rising number of suicides among teenagers.

In October 2010, Wagler was one of the many musicians that joined the worldwide campaign to celebrate John Lennon's 70th birthday put together by Google and EMI.
