= José Reyes (infielder) =

Dominican baseball player (born 1983)

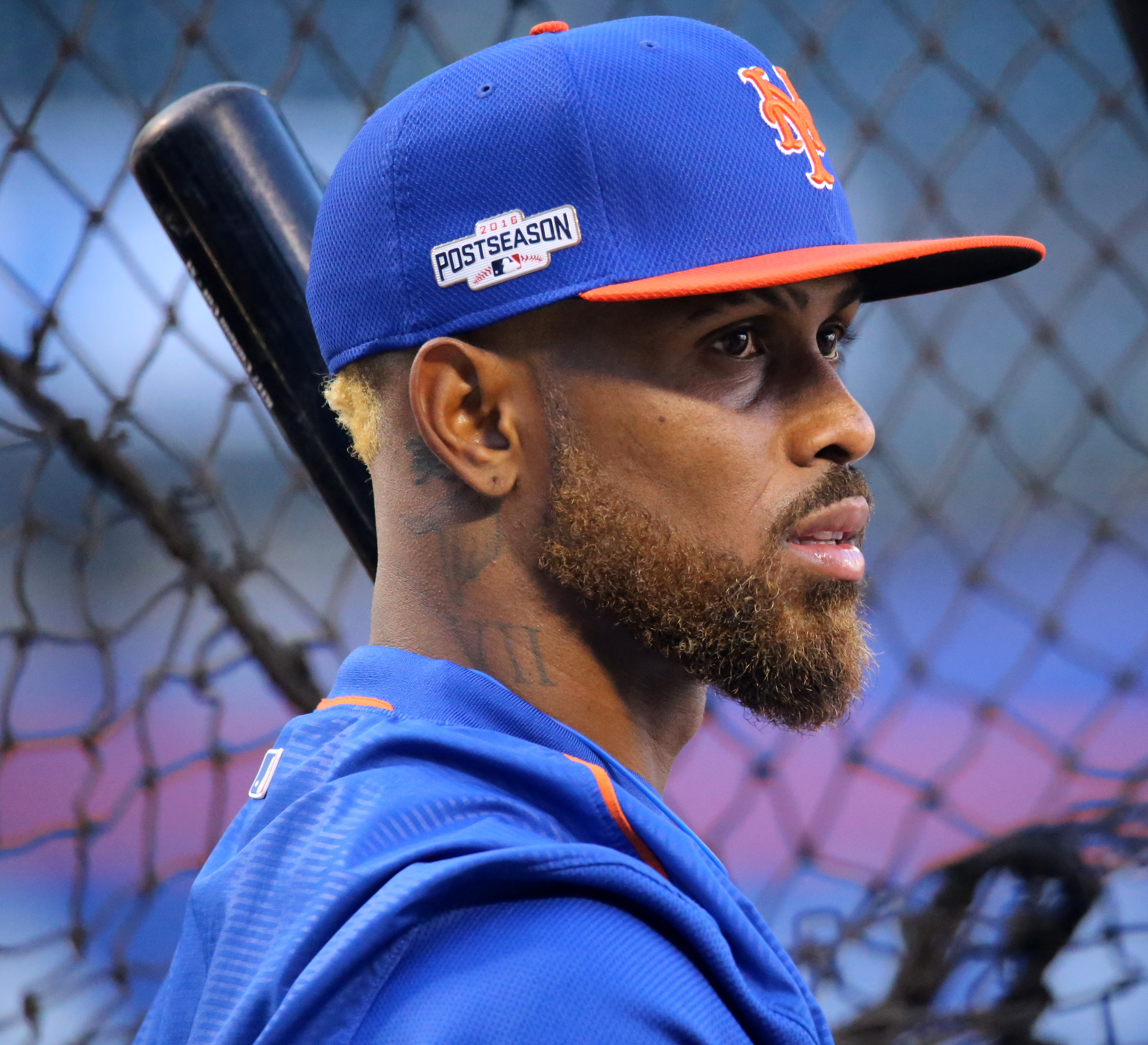
- Reyes with the New York Mets in 2016
- Shortstop
- Born: June 11, 1983 (age 43); Villa González, Dominican Republic
- Batted: Switch Threw: Right

MLB debut
- June 10, 2003, for the New York Mets

Last MLB appearance
- September 30, 2018, for the New York Mets

MLB statistics
- Batting average: .283
- Hits: 2,138
- Home runs: 145
- Runs batted in: 719
- Stolen bases: 517
- Stats at Baseball Reference

Teams
- New York Mets (2003–2011); Miami Marlins (2012); Toronto Blue Jays (2013–2015); Colorado Rockies (2015); New York Mets (2016–2018)

Career highlights and awards
- 4× All-Star (2006, 2007, 2010, 2011); Silver Slugger Award (2006); NL batting champion (2011); 3× NL stolen base leader (2005–2007)
Medals
Men's baseball
Representing Dominican Republic
World Baseball Classic
Gold medal – first place	2013 Dominican	Team

José Bernabe Reyes (born June 11, 1983) is a Dominican former professional baseball infielder. He played most notably at shortstop in Major League Baseball (MLB) for the New York Mets, Miami Marlins, Toronto Blue Jays, and Colorado Rockies.

Reyes is a four-time MLB All-Star. He led MLB in triples in 2005, 2006, 2008, and 2011. Reyes also led the National League (NL) in stolen bases in 2005, 2006, and 2007. He was the NL batting champion in 2011. He is also the New York Mets' all-time leader in triples (113) and stolen bases (408).

== Minor league career ==
Reyes was spotted by New York Mets scouts during a tryout camp in Santiago in the summer of 1999. After initial concerns over Reyes' slight frame, the Mets offered him a contract, which he signed on August 16, 1999. Despite traditionally sending youngsters to play in their Dominican academy, the Mets made an exception with Reyes and sent him to the Kingsport Mets of the Rookie-level Appalachian League for the 2000 season. He finished the season with a .250 batting average in 49 games.

For the 2001 season, Reyes was assigned to the Capital City Bombers of the Class A South Atlantic League. He excelled both in the field and at the plate, hitting .307 with 42 extra-base hits and winning the Player of the Year award.

After being invited to spring training with the major league Mets, Reyes began the 2002 season with the St. Lucie Mets in the Class A-Advanced Florida State League. In the first three months of the season, he demonstrated that he could handle the step up, and was promoted to the Binghamton Mets of the Double-A Eastern League. In his first game, Reyes had five hits and four RBIs, and he completed the season with a .287 average, 27 steals and 26 extra-base hits in 65 games.

On December 15, 2002, the Mets traded starting shortstop Rey Ordóñez to the Tampa Bay Devil Rays. Two weeks later, the Mets signed veteran Rey Sánchez to a one-year deal, with the plan being to allow Reyes to mature in the minors while Sanchez kept the big-league spot warm for him. Reyes spent the first two months of the 2003 season with the Norfolk Tides of the Triple-A International League, where he batted .269 and stole 26 bases in just 42 games.

Injuries to Mike Piazza and Mo Vaughn had contributed to the Mets' poor performance in the National League East, and eventually convinced manager Art Howe to begin playing some of the team's younger talent. When Rey Sánchez strained his thumb on June 5, 2003, Reyes received his call-up to the majors.

== Major League career ==
=== New York Mets (2003–11) ===
==== 2003–05 ====
Reyes made his major league debut on June 10, 2003, against the Texas Rangers, the day before his 20th birthday, going 2-for-4 with a pair of runs scored in a 9–7 loss. Reyes was the first teenager to play for the Mets since Gregg Jefferies in 1987, and the first to start a game since Dwight Gooden in 1984. After the game, Reyes collected the ball from his first career hit and sent it to his parents. Over the following weeks Reyes' impressive form continued, including a grand slam off Jarrod Washburn in an 8–0 victory over the Angels. When Rey Sánchez completed his month-long spell on the DL, Reyes' strong play moved Sánchez to the bench.

Reyes' season was cut short a month early by a sprained ankle, but he still managed to compile impressive rookie numbers. In 69 games, he batted .307 with 32 RBIs and 13 stolen bases. Reyes finished 8th in voting for the 2003 NL Rookie of the Year.

Prior to the 2004 season, the Mets signed Japanese star Kazuo Matsui, whose only condition upon signing was that he got a chance to play his regular position, shortstop. As a result, Reyes was asked to learn second base duties. Early on in the season, Reyes strained a hamstring and remained on the DL until June 19.

When he returned, the Mets were involved in a close race in the National League East with the Marlins, Phillies, and Braves. However, a back problem for Reyes and injuries to other key Mets players led to a collapse and instead of being involved in a pennant race, the team found itself fighting to stay out of last place in the division. By the end of the season, Reyes had returned to his preferred position of shortstop, with Matsui moving to second base. Reyes ended a disappointing season with a batting average of .255, 14 RBIs, and 19 stolen bases in 53 games.

At the age of 21, Reyes was handed the leadoff spot in the Mets' lineup in his first full season in the major leagues. Despite struggling slightly with his plate discipline — he had only 27 walks in a league-high 733 plate appearances — he finished the season with solid numbers. In 161 games he had 48 extra-base hits, 58 RBIs and 60 stolen bases. Reyes led the National League in stolen bases and led the majors in triples. However, he also led all National League shortstops with 18 errors.

==== 2006–07 ====
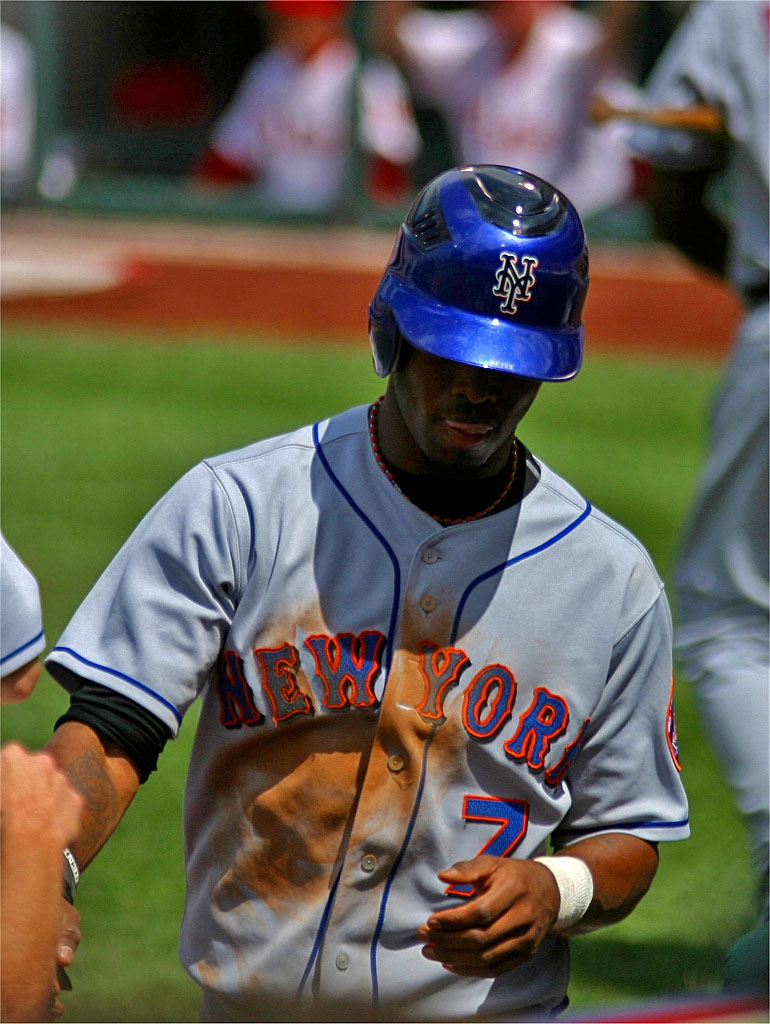
Reyes is congratulated after scoring, 2006

During spring training in 2006, the Mets brought in former player Rickey Henderson as a specialist instructor. One of the reasons Henderson was hired was to help tutor Reyes in the arts of getting on base and stealing bases — skills at which Henderson excelled throughout his own career.

Reyes won Player of the Week honors in the National League for the weeks beginning June 12 and 19, becoming the first Mets player to be named the NL Player of the Week for two consecutive weeks since Jesse Orosco in 1983. During this two-week period Reyes had 32 hits in 57 at-bats (a .561 batting average) and raised his season batting average from .246 to .302. On June 21, 2006, in a 6–5 loss against the Cincinnati Reds Reyes hit for the cycle, becoming the ninth player in team history to do so.

Reyes' outgoing personality began to make him a fan favorite in New York. He became well known for the elaborate handshakes he creates with his teammates to celebrate runs scored. In his spots as "Professor Reyes", Reyes taught the Shea faithful the Spanish language between innings on the stadium's Diamond Vision screen, helping to make him one of the Mets' most popular players.

On August 3, 2006, Reyes signed a four-year, $23.25 million contract extension with the Mets, thereby avoiding salary arbitration. The contract includes an $11 million option for 2011 with a buy-out of $500,000 if the Mets do not pick up the option. Reyes also received a $1.5 million signing bonus.

On August 15, 2006, Reyes hit three home runs in an 11–4 loss against the Philadelphia Phillies at Citizens Bank Park in Philadelphia. Two days later, he became the second player in Mets history to record at least 50 stolen bases in consecutive seasons. On September 7, 2006, Reyes hit the first inside-the-park home run of his career, against the Los Angeles Dodgers at Shea Stadium. Reyes was timed at 14.81 seconds for his dash around the bases — the equivalent of running a circular 100-meter dash in about 13.5 seconds.

As the 2006 season wound down, Reyes was in pursuit of an unusual feat — reaching 20 home runs, 20 triples, 20 doubles, and 20 stolen bases. Reyes finished the 2006 regular season with an average of .300, 19 home runs, 81 RBIs, 122 runs, and 64 stolen bases in 153 games. He increased his on-base percentage by 54 points, and his slugging percentage was almost 100 points higher than in 2005. Reyes' walk rate nearly doubled — in 30 fewer plate appearances, he went from 27 walks to 53. He also showed similar improvement in the field — in 2006 he had a range factor of 3.86, the lowest of all major league shortstops. Reyes picked up a Silver Slugger Award, was called up to his first All-Star Game, and finished 7th in NL MVP voting.

The Mets clinched their spot in the playoffs, and Reyes experienced the postseason for the first time in his career. He made his playoff debut on October 4, 2006, against the Los Angeles Dodgers in the 2006 National League Division Series. Though he hit just .167 for the series, he came up big in key situations, scoring the winning run in Game 1, driving in the go-ahead run in Game 2, and knocking in the game-tying run in the 6th inning of Game 3. In Game 6 of the 2006 National League Championship Series against the St. Louis Cardinals and facing elimination, Reyes hit a leadoff home run in the first inning to jump start his team and help force a deciding Game 7, which the Mets went on to lose, 3–1.

In November 2006, Reyes participated in the Major League Baseball Japan All-Star Series along with teammates John Maine and David Wright. He hit a two-run walk-off home run in the 10th inning of Game 5, giving the MLB team their first sweep of their NPB rivals.

On July 12, 2007, Reyes hit the ninth leadoff home run of his career against Cincinnati Reds pitcher Bronson Arroyo, setting a new record for the franchise.

In August, Reyes stole his 50th base of the year, becoming the first New York baseball player to steal 50 or more bases in three consecutive seasons. On August 22, 2007, Reyes stole his 65th, 66th, and 67th bases and broke Roger Cedeño's Mets record for the most stolen bases in a single season. August also saw Reyes tie the Mets record for stealing at least one base in four straight games.

In the last month of the season, Reyes' struggles were seen to be a key component of the Mets' late-season collapse. He batted .205 and had an on-base percentage of only .279. His struggles brought much criticism from Mets fans. On the second-to-last day of the regular season he was involved in a benches-clearing brawl against the Florida Marlins, which started when Miguel Olivo charged across the diamond and threw a punch at Reyes. Olivo would be ejected from the game and Reyes was allowed to stay in. The Mets would win the game 13–0. Reyes finished the season with a .280 batting average, 60 extra-base hits, 12 home runs, 57 RBIs, and 78 stolen bases in 160 games.

==== 2008–09 ====
In spring training and the early part of the 2008 season, Reyes vocalized a plan to focus a little more on baseball, and a little less on the theatrics — such as his dugout dances after home runs — that drew criticism during the late part of 2007 when the Mets were struggling. One of the casualties of this change of focus was the "Professor Reyes" segment played between innings at Shea where he taught the fans Spanish words and phrases. This was replaced by "Maine Street USA" with John Maine, and "Do The Wright Thing" with David Wright, which failed to match the popularity of Reyes' spots. However, with some prodding by his teammates, Reyes was encouraged to continue playing with the same energy as he had previously.

On July 3, Reyes' childhood friend Argenis Reyes was called up from the Triple-A New Orleans Zephyrs. When Argenis played, he and Reyes made up the middle infield for the Mets, with Argenis Reyes at second base. On July 20, Reyes overtook Mookie Wilson as the Mets' all-time triples leader after legging out his 63rd career triple in the fourth inning of a game against the Cincinnati Reds.

On September 10, Reyes broke the Mets' all-time record for stolen bases, previously held by Mookie Wilson, with his 282nd career stolen base coming in the third inning of a game against the Washington Nationals. After stealing second to break the record, he then stole third and scored the go-ahead run on a single by David Wright. On September 23, 2008, Reyes achieved his first 200-hit season with a bases-clearing triple. He is the second Mets player to reach this landmark, after Lance Johnson in 1996. Reyes finished the season with a batting average of .297, with 72 extra-base hits (including a majors-leading 19 triples), 68 RBIs and 56 stolen bases.

A few days before spring training, Mets manager Jerry Manuel announced that he was considering moving Reyes from the leadoff spot to 2nd or 3rd in the line-up. However, Reyes playing in the World Baseball Classic meant his playing time in the Mets training camp was limited, and led to Manuel deciding to move Reyes back to the leadoff spot. Speaking of the decision, Reyes said, "That's where I've hit all my life ... I'd like to be a leadoff hitter."

On May 3, 2009, Reyes was placed on the DL due to a calf injury. Reyes was expected to be back in early June but when rehabbing the injury he pulled himself from an extended spring training game; an MRI exam the following day revealed the tear, which Reyes confirmed was different from the initial injury. A September return was considered possible but he suffered yet another injury, a torn right hamstring while doing rehab work in August.

==== 2010 ====
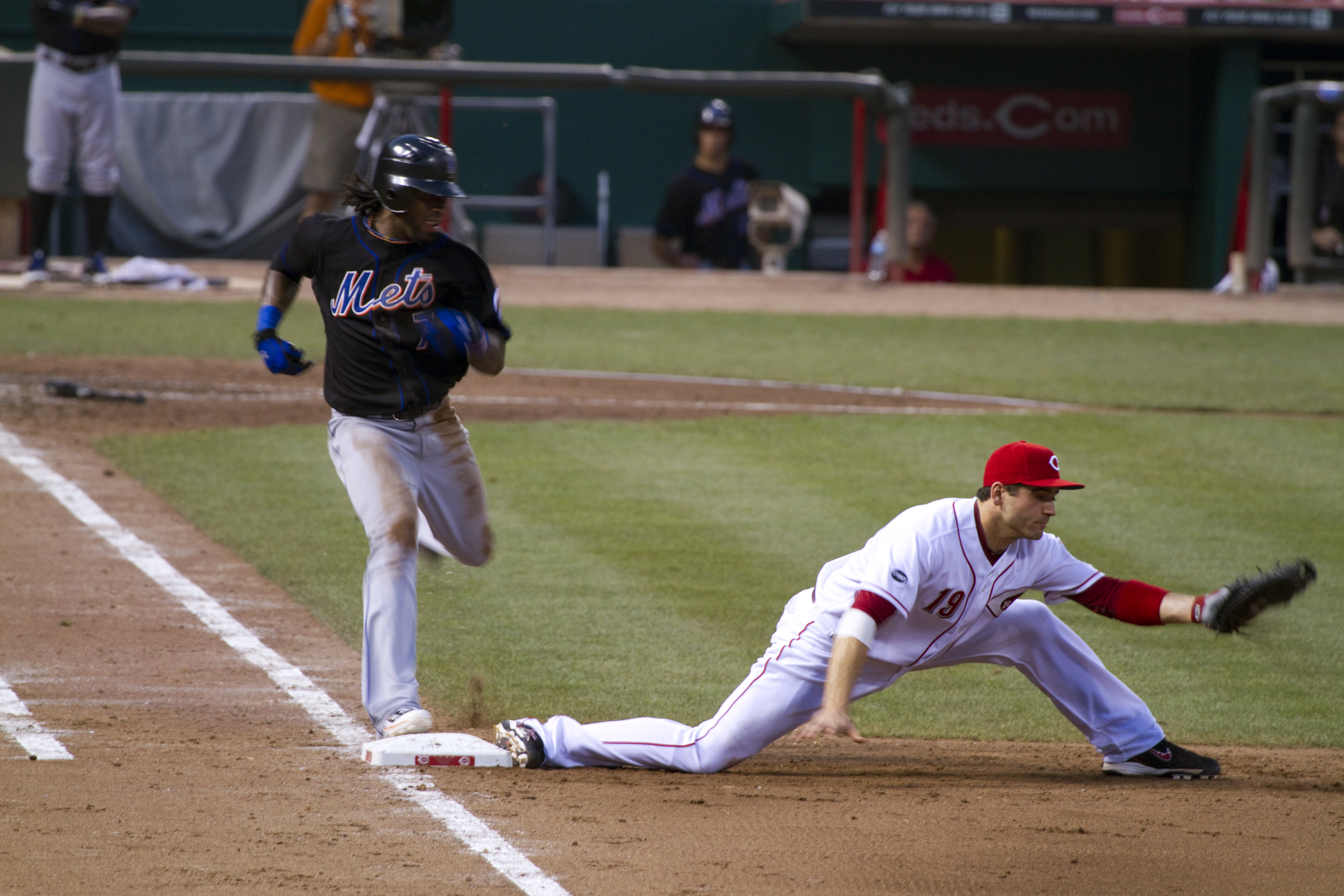
Reyes (left) running to first base in 2011

On March 11, 2010, Reyes was diagnosed with a hyperactive thyroid gland, and was ordered by doctors to cease spring training activity. On March 23, his thyroid levels returned to normal and he was cleared to play. He was placed on the 15-day disabled list and missed the start of the regular season.

On May 25, he had his 1000th career hit off of the Phillies' Jamie Moyer. On June 8, Reyes hit a game-tying home run in the 7th inning with two outs that had to be reviewed. The shot was originally called a double because it bounced back into play. The Mets went on to win the game in the 11th on a walk off shot by Ike Davis.

On July 4, Reyes was selected to his third All-Star Game, but he was unable to play due to an injury; Dodgers shortstop Rafael Furcal replaced Reyes. However, Reyes still attended the All-Star Game with his family.

==== 2011 ====
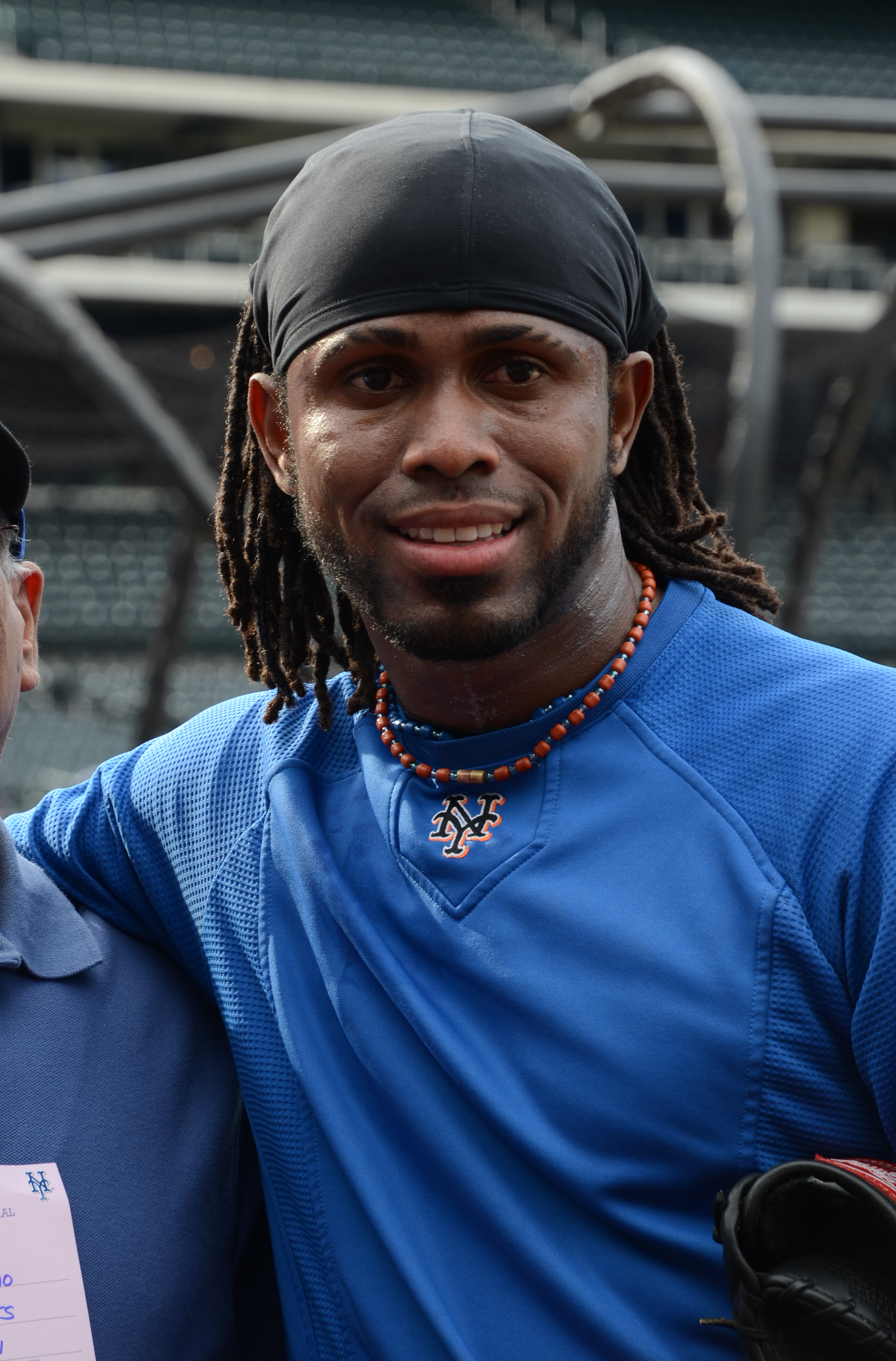
Reyes with the Mets in 2011

On June 28, in his 1,000th career game, Reyes stole his 360th base. This put him in the top 100 all-time in stolen bases. Reyes was voted in as the starting shortstop for the National League in the 2011 Major League Baseball All-Star Game. However, he did not participate due to a strained left hamstring.

Throughout the 2011 season, there were talks about Reyes' future and if it would be with the Mets. He decided he did not want to talk about it until the end of the season. As well as being a possible top target for teams in free agency, he was reportedly involved in trade talks with multiple teams, but the Mets decided they would hold onto him for the rest of the season and make an effort to re-sign him.

Reyes was once again placed on the disabled list due to a strained left hamstring.

On the final day of the season, after bunting for a single in his first at-bat in the first inning, Reyes asked his manager to remove him from the game, ending his season with a .337 batting average, two points ahead of Ryan Braun of the Milwaukee Brewers in the race for the NL batting title. Braun went 0–4 later in the day to finish at .332. Reyes became the first Met in franchise history to win an NL batting title. Reyes's decision came on the 70th anniversary of Ted Williams' refusal to sit out a doubleheader on the last day of the 1941 season, putting his .400 batting average at risk but ultimately hitting 6-for-8 and raising his average from .39955 to .406. Reyes played in 126 games in 2011, the fewest games played by a batting champion since Manny Ramirez's 120 games played in 2002. He became a free agent at the end of the season.

=== Miami Marlins (2012) ===
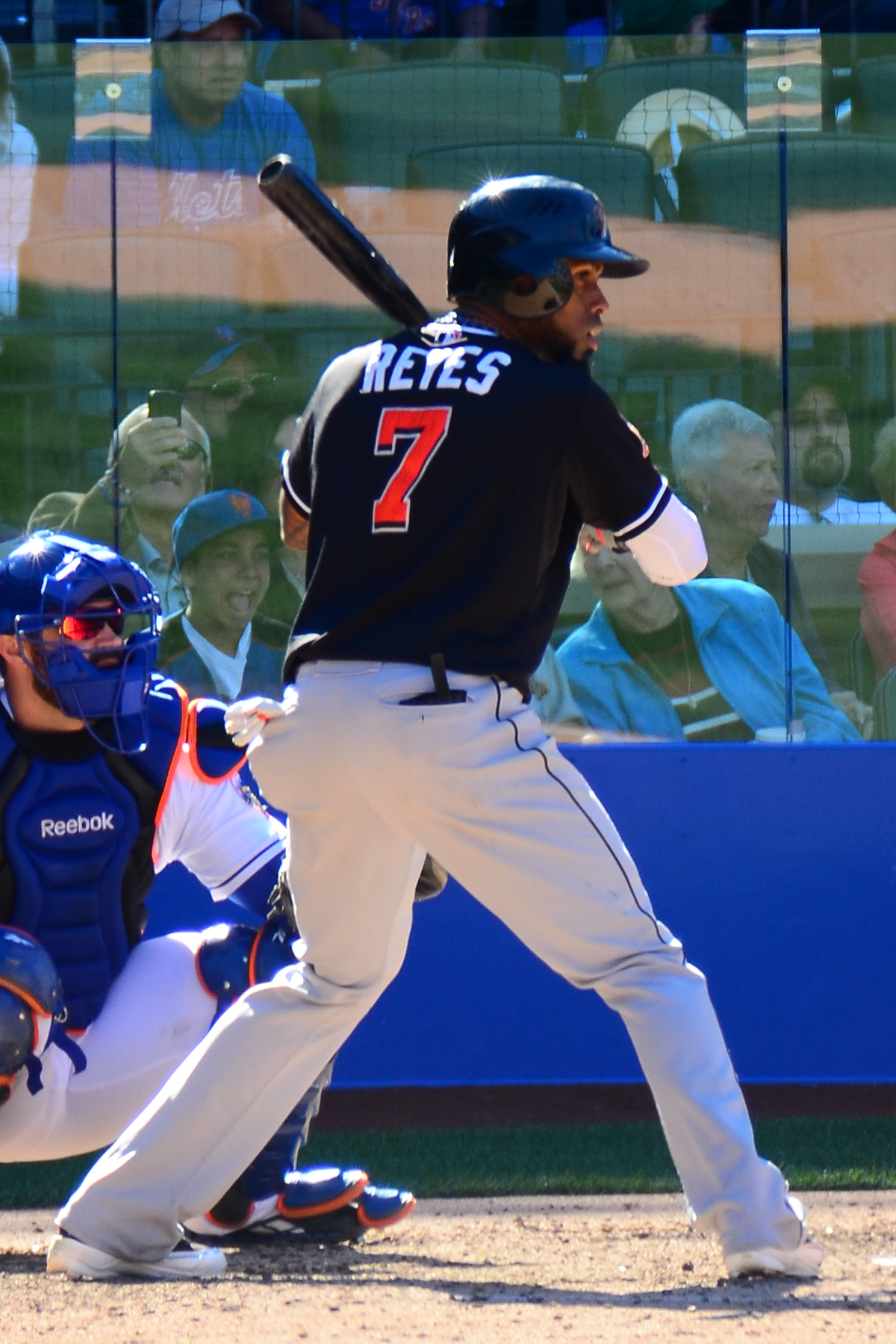
Reyes batting for the Miami Marlins in 2012

On December 7, 2011, Reyes agreed to a six-year, $106 million contract with the Miami Marlins. Upon his signing with the Miami Marlins, he appeared on MLB Network where he had his signature dreadlocks cut off on February 3 to coincide with Marlins' dress code prohibiting long hair.

Reyes had the first Marlins hit at Marlins Park, against Kyle Lohse of the St. Louis Cardinals, breaking up a no-hitter in the 7th inning.

Reyes finished the year hitting .287 and finished second in the NL in triples (12), second in at-bats per strikeout (11.5), and third in steals (40). He split time between the leadoff role and batting third.

=== Toronto Blue Jays (2013–15) ===
On November 19, 2012, Reyes was traded to the Toronto Blue Jays along with Josh Johnson, Mark Buehrle, John Buck, and Emilio Bonifacio, in exchange for Jeff Mathis, Adeiny Hechavarria, Henderson Álvarez, Yunel Escobar, Jake Marisnick, Anthony DeSclafani, and Justin Nicolino. Reyes needed to be carted off the field during a game against the Kansas City Royals on April 12, 2013, after hearing a pop in his left ankle while sliding into second. Reyes was placed on the 15-day disabled list on April 13. On April 15, general manager Alex Anthopoulos reported that an MRI scan revealed no fracture and that no surgery would be required, but that Reyes was expected to miss three months. On April 15, CBS Sports reported that Reyes's ankle injury was less severe than originally thought, reducing his time on the DL to eight weeks, but that was later refuted by Blue Jays management. He was placed on the 60-day disabled list on April 23 to make room for Aaron Laffey.

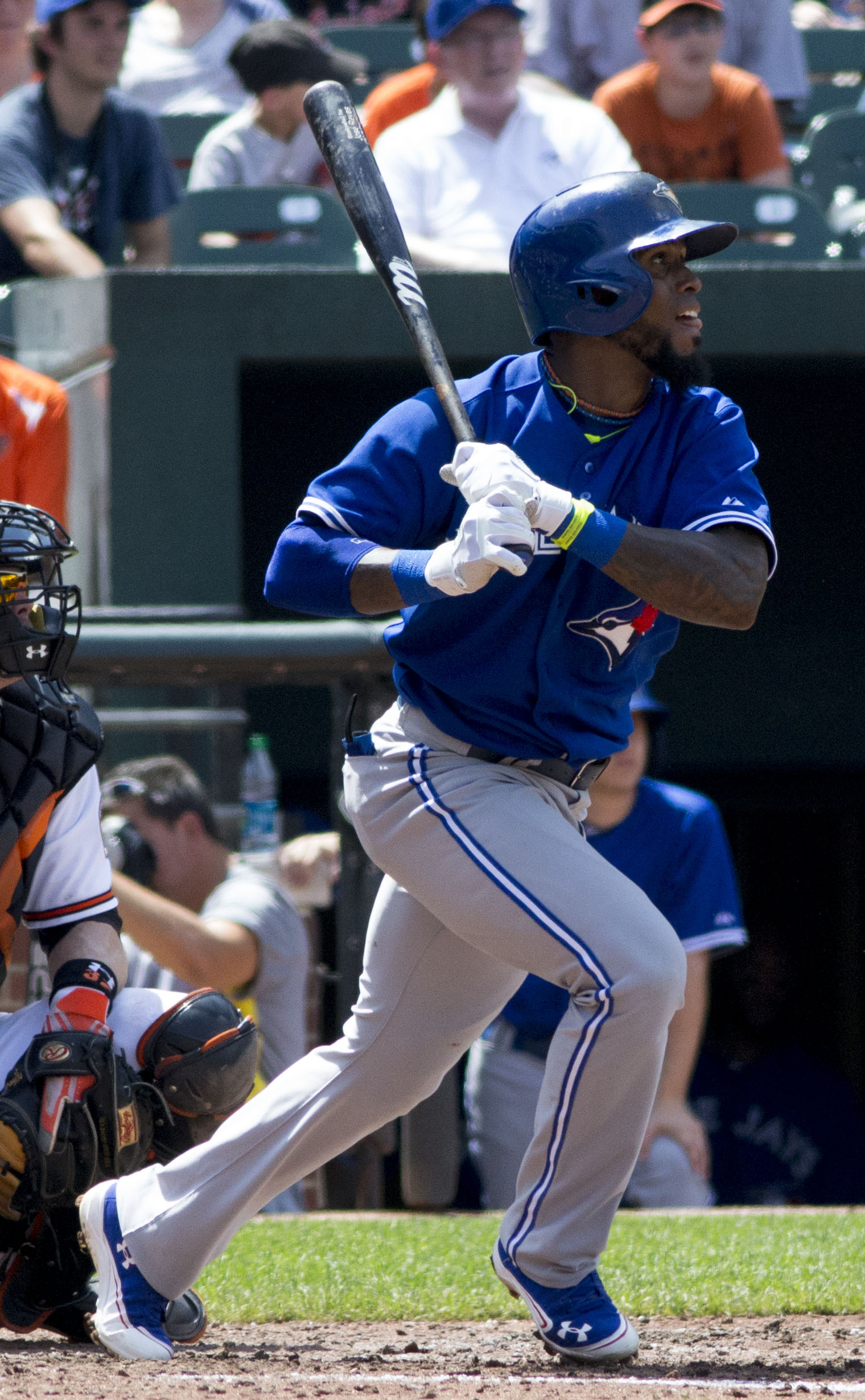
Reyes with the Toronto Blue Jays in 2013

Reyes was held out of baseball activities for several weeks before playing two innings in a simulated game on June 14. He then began a rehab assignment in High-A Dunedin. Reyes played in 3 games and recorded a .417 average with 3 runs scored, 1 RBI and 1 stolen base. Reyes was promoted to Triple-A Buffalo on June 21, and scored the winning run against the Durham Bulls. After playing three games in Buffalo, Alex Anthopoulos said Reyes would play another game in Buffalo, followed by a game in Double-A New Hampshire. The plan was for Reyes to then be called up on June 27 when the Blue Jays begin a 4-game series against the Boston Red Sox, however it was later reported that Reyes would be called up one day earlier. Reyes went to Tampa Bay on June 25, rather than going to New Hampshire and was present in the dugout, despite not being able to play. He went 0–4 in his return to the lineup on June 26, but the Blue Jays won on R. A. Dickey's complete game shutout 3–0. Reyes recorded his first hit since coming off the disabled list on June 28 against the Boston Red Sox. The hit was also his 1,500th career hit. Reyes played his first game at home since coming off the disabled list on Canada Day and went 3–5 with a solo home run. On August 2, in a 7–5 loss to the Los Angeles Angels of Anaheim, Reyes recorded his 500th career RBI on a two-run home run. In a game against the Seattle Mariners on August 6, Reyes hit his 100th career home run, a solo shot to lead off the game off of Félix Hernández.

After experiencing a minor hamstring strain during spring training, Reyes began the 2014 season batting leadoff for the Blue Jays. In his first at-bat on Opening Day he aggravated his hamstring injury while running to first base, and was placed on the 15-day disabled list at the end of the game. Reyes was activated on April 19, after playing in two rehab games with the High-A Dunedin Blue Jays. He avoided the disabled list for the rest of the season, playing in 143 games and batting .287 with 9 home runs, 51 RBI, and 30 stolen bases.

On April 28, 2015, Reyes was placed on the 15-day disabled list due to a rib strain. He was activated on May 25. Before being traded to Colorado, Reyes had batted .285 with 4 home runs and 34 RBI in 69 games with the Blue Jays.

=== Colorado Rockies (2015) ===
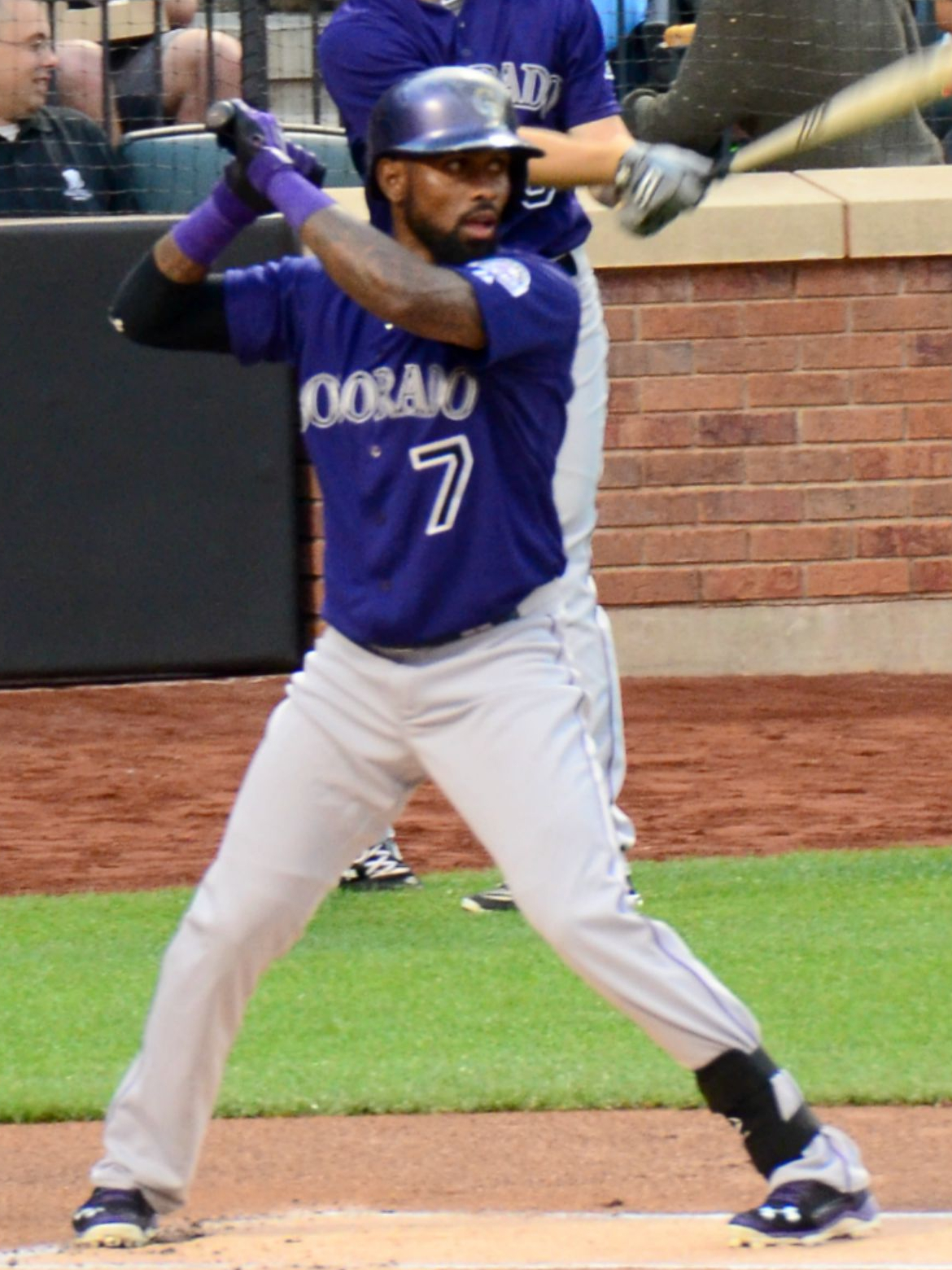
Reyes with the Rockies in 2015

On July 27, 2015, Reyes was traded to the Colorado Rockies, along with Jeff Hoffman, Miguel Castro, and Jesús Tinoco, in exchange for Troy Tulowitzki and LaTroy Hawkins. In 47 more games with the Rockies, Reyes batted .259 with three home runs, 19 RBI, and eight stolen bases. Overall in 2015, combined with both teams, Reyes played 132 total games with a .274 batting average, 24 stolen bases, 19 home runs, and 53 RBI.

=== Second stint with the New York Mets (2016–2018) ===
On June 25, 2016, Reyes became a free agent and signed a minor league contract with the New York Mets. Reyes began his second stint in the Mets organization by being assigned to the Brooklyn Cyclones. In his stints with the Cyclones and the Binghamton Mets, Reyes batted .176, and made an error at third base. On July 4, the Mets announced that they would be activating Reyes on July 5. In his first MLB game with the Mets since 2011, Reyes went 0-for-4. On July 30, Reyes was placed on the 15-day disabled list with a Grade 1 intercostal muscle strain.

Reyes returned from the disabled list in August, and proceeded to become what some considered the spark for a run deprived Mets offense. On September 22, Reyes hit a two-run home run in the bottom of the 9th inning in a pivotal game against the Philadelphia Phillies to even the score at 6–6. Asdrúbal Cabrera would later hit a three-run home run in the 11th inning to win, 9–8, propelling the Mets to a Wild Card berth. Reyes batted .267 with eight home runs and 24 RBIs in 2016. After 60 games with the Mets in 2016, the club picked up its option on its contract with Reyes, keeping him with the team for the major league minimum salary in 2017.

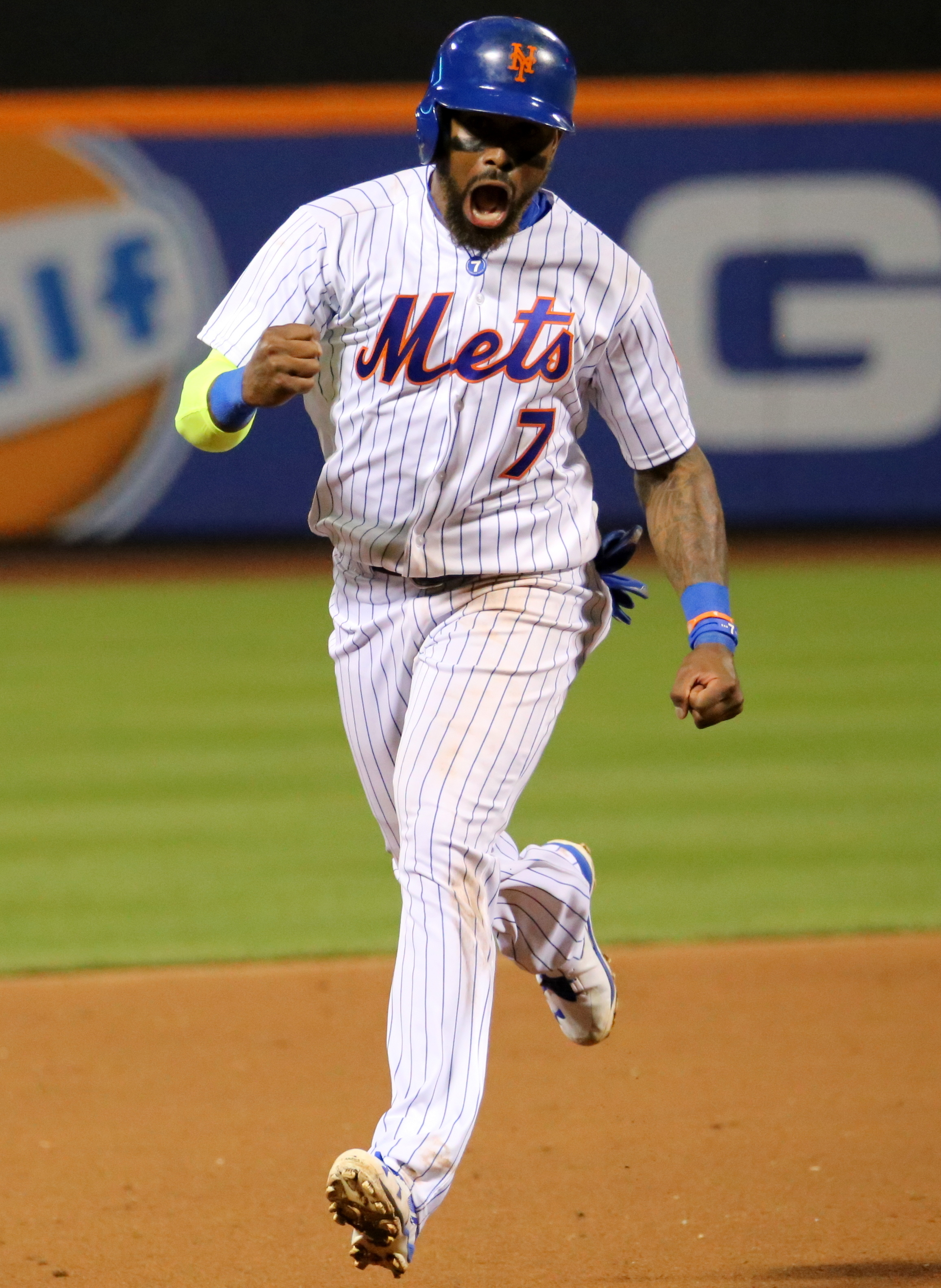
Reyes with the Mets in 2016

Prior to the 2017 season, Reyes began working out as a full-time utility player, playing the infield and center field. Reyes' first appearance in center field came on May 13 against the Milwaukee Brewers at Miller Park. He only played one inning in center field, before finishing the game at shortstop. On May 20, Reyes collected his 2,000 career hit; a single off Los Angeles Angels pitcher Alex Meyer. On July 24, Reyes became the 39th player in MLB history to steal 500 career bases.

In 2017, he batted .246/.315/.413, the lowest batting average of his major league career, with 15 home runs and 75 runs scored. After the season, he re-signed with the Mets on a one-year, $2 million contract.

On July 31, 2018, when the Mets were already down 19–1 to the Washington Nationals, Reyes fulfilled a longtime dream and pitched the 8th inning, conceding six runs, including two home runs. He then became the first MLB player since Cap Anson in 1884 to give up two home runs as a pitcher in one game and subsequently hit two home runs in the following game (on August 1). In 2018, he batted .189/.260/.320 with five stolen bases (each a career low).

He elected free agency on October 29, 2018.

On July 29, 2020, Reyes announced his official retirement from professional baseball on his Twitter account.

== International career ==
=== 2006 World Baseball Classic ===
Reyes represented the Dominican Republic in the 2006 World Baseball Classic. The team finished top of their group in both the first and second rounds, but fell to Puerto Rico in the semi-finals. Reyes' playing time was limited due to the presence of Miguel Tejada in the shortstop spot. In 6 at-bats, Reyes collected 1 hit and 1 run, as well as 2 stolen bases.

=== 2009 World Baseball Classic ===
Reyes was again called up to the Dominican Republic team for the 2009 competition. He had a disappointing tournament as the Dominican Republic were eliminated after only three games, suffering two defeats against the underdog Netherlands team. Reyes finished the tournament with just one hit and two runs from nine at-bats.

=== 2013 World Baseball Classic ===
After two disappointing tournaments in 2006 and 2009, Reyes and the Dominican Republic team ran the table in 2013 tournament going 7–0 to make it to the Classic Final against Puerto Rico. They defeated their 2009 nemesis the Netherlands in the semifinal 4–1 and redeemed their 2009 losses. In the final, the Dominican Republic defeated Puerto Rico 3–0 to become the first team to go undefeated in the tournament. Reyes had a much better tournament in 2013, batting .314 with a home run and 11 hits.

== Music ==
Reyes is a dembow musician and owner of a record label. In May 2011, Reyes released his debut song, "Bat Roto" (Spanish for "Broken Bat"), that was played on Spanish radio stations and in nightclubs in the United States and the Dominican Republic. In July, he released a video for his reggaeton song named "No Hay Amigo" ("There is No Friend"), which featured established reggaeton artists Julio Voltio, Vakero, and Big Mato.

Reyes used the song Chacarron by El Chombo for his walk-up music throughout his career with the New York Mets.

Reyes created a record label, EL7 Music, whose name was inspired by his uniform number. As of 2011, he had financed all of the label's operations.

He is featured in the song "5 Mujeres" by Lirico En La Casa released with a music video by March 22, 2019.

== Personal life ==
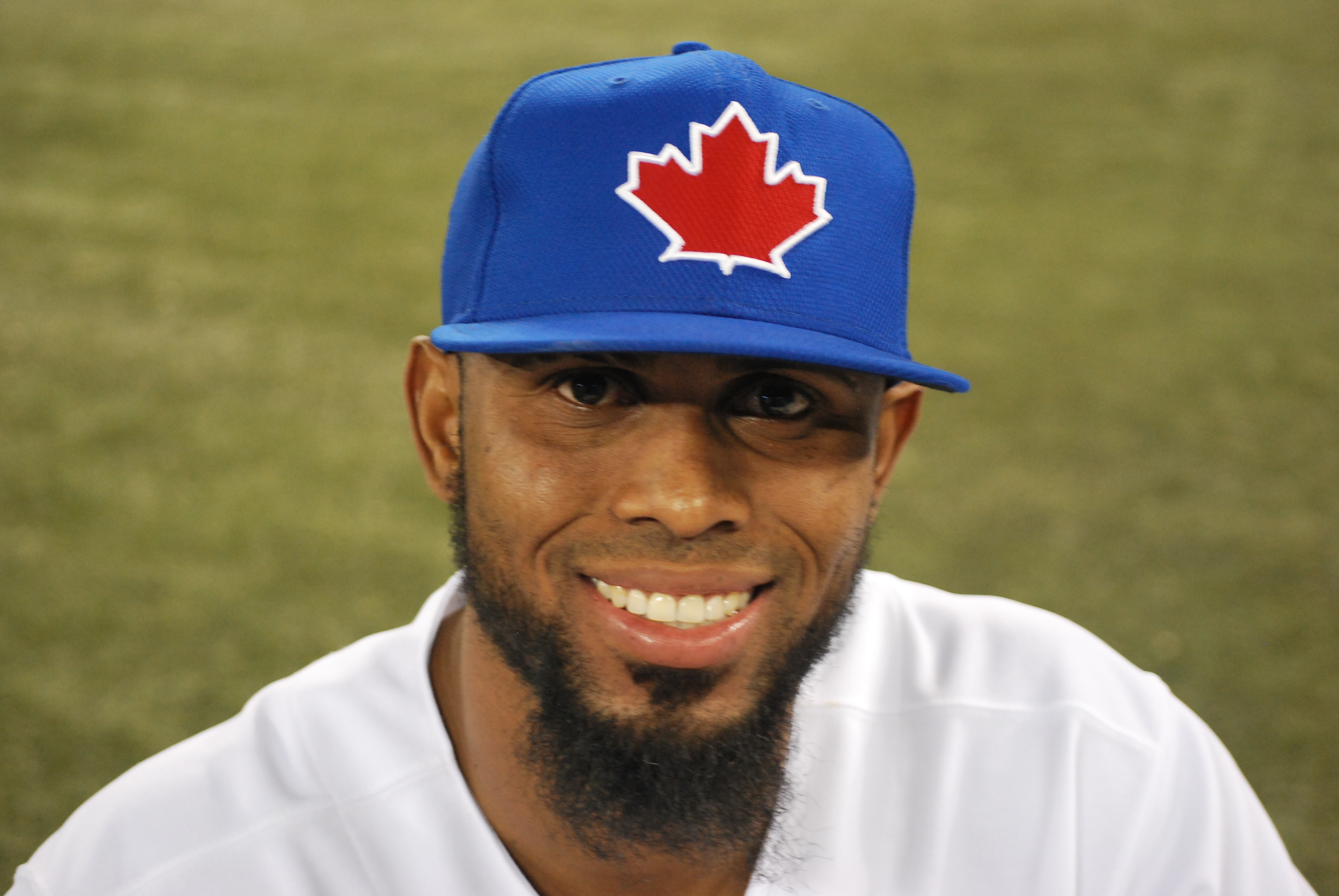
Reyes with the Blue Jays in 2013

After leaving the Mets for free agency, Reyes continued to make his offseason home on Long Island. He had lived in Manhasset, New York with his wife, Katherine, and then moved to Old Brookville. Reyes was a close friend to former right-handed pitcher José Lima. When Lima died May 23, 2010, Reyes said, "He's the funniest guy you could ever meet, he always smiled, he was always happy. It was good to know him. It's a real tough day...I've known him a long time. People in the Dominican Republic love the guy a lot, so it's a very tough day not only for the Dominican people, but for everyone because of the guy that he was."

Reyes married Katherine Ramirez on July 25, 2008. They have three daughters and a son together.

Reyes and his wife became American citizens on April 4, 2018.

=== Domestic violence ===
During the 2015–16 offseason, Reyes was charged with domestic violence, stemming from an incident with his wife while on vacation in Wailea, Hawaii. He allegedly grabbed her by the throat and shoved her into a door before hotel security called the police. She was taken to the emergency room with injuries to the side, neck, and wrist. On February 23, 2016, MLB Commissioner Rob Manfred announced that Reyes would be placed on paid administrative leave until at least April, when his trial began. On March 30, 2016, prosecutors in Maui moved to dismiss the domestic abuse charges on the grounds that his wife was refusing to cooperate as a witness. On May 13, Manfred announced that Reyes was suspended without pay until May 31, spanning the Colorado Rockies' first 51 games of the season. On May 31, the day his suspension expired, he was optioned to Triple-A Albuquerque for a rehab assignment. Despite projections that he would return to the team, he was designated for assignment by the Rockies on June 15.

== Media appearances ==
On December 7, 2007, Reyes was announced as the cover athlete for Major League Baseball 2K8 from 2K Sports, taking over from New York Yankees counterpart Derek Jeter. Reyes was also the cover athlete for the Nintendo DS spinoff, Major League Baseball 2K8 Fantasy All-Stars, albeit in cartoon form.

On January 23, 2024, Reyes was announced as a housemate on the fourth season of the American Spanish-language reality television series La Casa de los Famosos. He was evicted from the house after 112 days, placing 8th on the season.

== Awards and honors ==
- Four-time NL All-Star (2006, 2007, 2010, 2011)
- Two-time New York Mets Minor League Player of the Year (2001, 2002)
- 2001 Low-A All-Star
- 2002 1st Team Minor League All-Star
- 2002 Florida State League All-Star
- 2002 Eastern League All-Star
- 2002 Futures Game All-Star MVP
- 2006 NL Silver Slugger Award
- 2007 NL Player of the Month Award (April)

== Achievements ==
- Four-time NL triples leader (2005, 2006, 2008, 2011)
- Three-time NL stolen bases leader (2005, 2006, 2007)
- 2011 NL batting champion
- New York Mets all-time leader in triples
- New York Mets all-time leader in stolen bases
- 500 career stolen bases

== See also ==
- List of Major League Baseball players to hit for the cycle
- List of Major League Baseball annual stolen base leaders
- List of Major League Baseball annual triples leaders
- List of Major League Baseball career stolen bases leaders
- List of Major League Baseball career runs scored leaders

Awards and achievements
Preceded by Randy Winn	Hitting for the cycle June 21, 2006	Succeeded by Luke Scott
Preceded by Ryan Howard	National League Player of the Month; April 2007	Succeeded by Prince Fielder
