= Major League Baseball 2K6 =

2006 video game

- North American cover art, featuring Derek Jeter
- Developer: Kush Games
- Publisher: 2K
- Series: MLB 2K
- Platforms: PlayStation 2, Xbox, Xbox 360, PlayStation Portable, GameCube
- Release: April 3, 2006: PlayStation 2, Xbox; NA: April 3, 2006 Xbox 360; NA: April 10, 2006 PlayStation Portable; NA: April 13, 2006 GameCube; NA: June 12, 2006
- Genre: Sports
- Modes: Single-player, multiplayer

Major League Baseball 2K6 (MLB 2K6) is a 2006 Major League Baseball licensed baseball video game developed by Kush Games and published by 2K. It was released for Xbox 360, Xbox, GameCube, PlayStation 2 and PlayStation Portable. This is the first time the any 2K Sports game was released for a Nintendo system since the 2K3 Series of games and the first Major League Baseball 2K game as World Series Baseball 2K3 was canceled for the system along with the 2K4/ESPN Series of games.

It has new features, such as Inside Edge, World Baseball Classic, online experience and many more. This game also features various aspects that are new to baseball games, including fans shouting, the "swing stick", showboat catches, fans catching balls, and power rankings.

== In-game commentary ==
Jon Miller and Joe Morgan provide in game commentary while Jeanne Zelasko and Steve Physioc are the studio hosts for the fictional program, Hard Ball Central.

== World Baseball Classic ==
For the first time in the series, the World Baseball Classic is included and any of the 16 teams from the inaugural 2006 classic can be chosen.

Group A

- Japan
- China
- Korea
- Taiwan

Group B

- USA
- Mexico
- Canada
- South Africa

Group C

- Puerto Rico
- Cuba
- Netherlands
- Panama

Group D

- Dominican Republic
- Venezuela
- Italy
- Australia

== Licensing issues ==
Barry Bonds does not appear in this title. However, Joe Young, a fictional left fielder, is believed to be a younger switch-hitter version of Bonds. Bonds does not appear because he is not a member of the MLB Players Association. Young appears in place of Bonds in all titles. However, there were several fictional characters such as 'Carnival Lane'.

== Reception ==
Reception

Aggregate score
Aggregator	Score				
Aggregator	GameCube	PS2	PSP	Xbox	Xbox 360
Metacritic	66/100	70/100	69/100	71/100	66/100

Review scores
Publication	Score				
Publication	GameCube	PS2	PSP	Xbox	Xbox 360
Electronic Gaming Monthly	7/10	7/10	N/A	7/10	N/A
Famitsu	N/A	N/A	N/A	N/A	29/40
Game Informer	N/A	8.5/10	N/A	8.5/10	7/10
GamePro	N/A	N/A	N/A	N/A	3.5/5
GameRevolution	N/A	B−	N/A	B−	C+
GameSpot	7.5/10	7/10	7.4/10	7.3/10	6.8/10
GameSpy	2/5	3/5	N/A	3/5	2/5
GameTrailers	N/A	N/A	N/A	N/A	6.8/10
GameZone	N/A	N/A	N/A	7.4/10	7.2/10
IGN	7/10	7.3/10	6.7/10	7.3/10	7/10
Nintendo Power	6.5/10	N/A	N/A	N/A	N/A
Official U.S. PlayStation Magazine	N/A	3.5/5	3/5	N/A	N/A
Official Xbox Magazine (US)	N/A	N/A	N/A	7.5/10	7/10
The A.V. Club	N/A	C	N/A	C	C

The game received "average" reviews on all platforms according to the review aggregation website Metacritic. In Japan, where the Xbox 360 version was ported and published by Spike on July 27, 2006, followed by the PlayStation 2 version on March 8, 2007, Famitsu gave it a score of one eight and three sevens for the former console version.
