= Mourning (Tantric song) =

Single by Tantric

from the album Tantric
- Released: 2001
- Genre: Post-grunge; alternative rock
- Length: 4:20
- Label: Maverick Records
- Songwriters: Hugo Ferreira, Matt Taul, Jesse Vest and Todd Whitener

Tantric singles chronology
"Astounded" (2001)	"Mourning" (2001)	"Hey Now" (2004)

"Mourning" is a song written and recorded by the American rock band Tantric. It was released as the third single from the band's platinum selling first album titled Tantric in 2001. It is the band's second highest-charting single to date behind "Breakdown".

== Charts ==
Chart (2001)	Peak position
US Modern Rock Tracks (Billboard)	22
US Mainstream Rock Tracks (Billboard)	18

== Appearances ==
"Mourning" was used in the soundtrack to the 2002 film The Salton Sea.
