= Astounded (Tantric song) =

2001 single by Tantric

Single by Tantric

from the album Tantric
- Released: May 29, 2001
- Genre: Post-grunge
- Length: 4:21
- Label: Maverick
- Songwriters: Hugo Ferreira; Matt Taul; Jesse Vest; Todd Whitener
- Producer: Toby Wright

Tantric singles chronology
"Breakdown" (2001)	"Astounded" (2001)	"Mourning" (2001)

Music video
- "Astounded" on YouTube

"Astounded" is a song written and recorded by the American rock band Tantric. It was released on May 29, 2001, as the second single from their 2001 self-titled debut album. It served as the follow-up to their number-one mainstream rock hit, "Breakdown".

== Charts ==
=== Weekly charts ===
Chart (2001)	Peak position
US Mainstream Rock Tracks (Billboard)	7
US Modern Rock Tracks (Billboard)	30

=== Year-end charts ===
Chart (2001)	Position
US Mainstream Rock Tracks (Billboard)	23
