= After We Go (song) =

Single by Tantric

from the album After We Go
- Released: 2004
- Recorded: 2002–2003
- Genre: Post-grunge, alternative metal, hard rock
- Length: 4:21
- Label: Maverick Records
- Songwriters: Hugo Ferreira, Matt Taul, Jesse Vest and Todd Whitener

Tantric singles chronology
"The Chain" (2004)	"After We Go" (2004)	"Down and Out" (2008)

"After We Go" is a song written and recorded by the American rock band Tantric. The song was released as the third and final single from the band's 2004 second album of the same name (After We Go). Though the song was released as a single no cover artwork is known to exist, the song peaked six spots higher than their previously released single "The Chain" peaking at number 30 on the Billboard US Mainstream Rock charts.

== Charts ==
Chart (2004)	Peak position
US Mainstream Rock (Billboard)	30
