= Breakdown (Tantric song) =

Single by Tantric

from the album Tantric
- Released: January 9, 2001
- Genre: Post-grunge
- Length: 3:10
- Label: Maverick
- Songwriters: Hugo Ferreira; Matt Taul; Jesse Vest; Todd Whitener
- Producer: Toby Wright

Tantric singles chronology
"Breakdown" (2001)	"Astounded" (2001)

Music video
- "Breakdown" on YouTube

"Breakdown" is a song by American post-grunge band Tantric, released as the band's debut single and as lead single from their self-titled debut album. The song topped the US Billboard Mainstream Rock Tracks chart and reached number four on the Billboard Modern Rock Tracks chart. The music video found substantial airplay on MTV2.

== Background and composition ==
Guitarist Todd Whitener came up with the song while sitting in an Amsterdam hotel. He described the meaning behind "Breakdown" in an interview with MTV:

"That song's pretty much about being pooped on and realizing that life is going to move on and you just have to keep your head high. Things will work out in the end, as long as you stay positive".

Lyrically, "Breakdown" describes a high school student filled with resentment and self-disgust. In combination with the band's acoustic-heavy sound, "Breakdown" also utilizes a digital effect at the end of the chorus.

== Charts ==
=== Weekly charts ===
Chart (2001)	Peak position
Canada Radio (Nielsen BDS)	58
Canada Rock (Nielsen BDS)	9
US Bubbling Under Hot 100 Singles (Billboard)	6
US Mainstream Rock Tracks (Billboard)	1
US Modern Rock Tracks (Billboard)	4

=== Year-end charts ===
Chart (2001)	Position
US Mainstream Rock Tracks (Billboard)	12
US Modern Rock Tracks (Billboard)	17

== Release history ==
Region	Date	Format(s)	Label(s)	Ref.
United States	January 9, 2001	Active rock radio	Maverick	
Australia	May 21, 2001	CD	Maverick	
