= Lost Angel =

Lost Angel or Lost Angels may refer to:

- Lost Angel (film), a 1943 movie starring Margaret O'Brien
- Lost Angels, a 1989 independent film
- The Lost Angel: Stories, a 1971 collection written by Elizabeth Goudge
- Lost Angels (TV series), an American neo-noir crime drama television series renamed Mob City prior to release

== Music ==
- Lost Angel (album), the only album of 3rd Strike
- "Lost Angel", a song on the 2004 Heart album Jupiters Darling
- "Lost Angel", a 2004 single by Day After Tomorrow
- "Lost Angels" song by Sweet
- "Lost Angels" (song), a 2009 single by Japanese musical artist Gackt

== See also ==
- Lost Angeles (disambiguation)
