= Breaking the Silence =

Breaking the Silence may refer to:

== Films ==
- Breaking the Silence (1992 film) a made-for-TV film directed by Robert Iscove
- Breaking the Silence (film), a 2000 Chinese film
- Breaking the Silence: Truth and Lies in the War on Terror, a 2003 documentary film
- Lima: Breaking the Silence, a 1998 film based on the 1997 Japanese embassy hostage crisis in Lima
- 1912: Breaking the Silence, a three-part documentary series by Gloria Rolando

== Music ==
- Breaking the Silence (album), a 1987 album by Heathen
- Breaking the Silence (EP), an EP by The Letter Black
- "Breaking the Silence", a song by Breaking Benjamin from their album Dark Before Dawn
- "Breaking the Silence", a song by Queensrÿche from their album Operation: Mindcrime
- Breaking the Silence (Firewind song), a 2007 single by Firewind
- Breaking the Silence, former name of Christian rock band The Letter Black

== Other ==
- Breaking the Silence, a 1990 autobiography by Mariette Hartley, written with Anne Commire
- Breaking the Silence (organization), Israeli NGO established by IDF soldiers and veterans
- Breaking the silence NSW, 2006 report of the Aboriginal Sexual Assault Taskforce in New South Wales, Australia
- Breaking the Silence (play), a stage play by Stephen Poliakoff
- "Breaking the Silence" (Butterflies), a 1978 television episode

== See also ==
- Break the Silence (disambiguation)
