= Hey Now (Tantric song) =

Single by Tantric

from the album After We Go
- Released: December 9, 2003
- Genre: Post-grunge, alternative metal, nu metal, hard rock
- Length: 3:09
- Label: Maverick Records
- Songwriters: Nuno Bettencourt, Hugo Ferreira, Matt Taul, Jesse Vest and Todd Whitener

Tantric singles chronology
"Mourning" (2001)	"Hey Now" (2003)	"The Chain" (2004)

"Hey Now" is a song written and recorded by the American rock band Tantric. It was released as the lead single from their 2004 second studio album After We Go on December 9, 2003.

== Charts ==
Chart (2004)	Peak position
US Mainstream Rock Tracks (Billboard)	8
