= The Chain =

1977 song by Fleetwood Mac

Song by Fleetwood Mac

from the album Rumours
- Released: 4 February 1977
- Recorded: 1976
- Genre: Rock
- Length: 4:28
- Label: Warner Bros.
- Songwriters: Lindsey Buckingham; Mick Fleetwood; Christine McVie; John McVie; Stevie Nicks
- Producers: Fleetwood Mac; Ken Caillat; Richard Dashut

Audio sample
- file; help

"The Chain" is a song by the British-American band Fleetwood Mac, released on their 1977 album Rumours. It is the only song in the band's discography credited to all five band members of the Rumours lineup (Stevie Nicks, Lindsey Buckingham, Christine McVie, John McVie, and Mick Fleetwood).

"The Chain" was created from combinations of several previously rejected materials, including compositions from Buckingham, Nicks, and McVie. The song was assembled, often manually by splicing tapes with a razor blade, at the Record Plant in Sausalito, California, with engineers Ken Caillat and Richard Dashut.

Following the critical and commercial success of Rumours, "The Chain" has become a staple of the band's live shows, typically the opening song. It was featured as the opening track on The Dance, a 1997 live concert CD/DVD release, as well as several of the band's greatest hits compilations and has become their second most streamed track on Spotify with over 1.5 billion streams. The song has attained particular fame in the United Kingdom, where the instrumental section has been used as the theme tune for the BBC and Channel 4's television and radio coverage of Formula One.

== Background ==
According to interviews on the writing of Rumours, the final section of "The Chain" (beginning with a bass progression) was created by John McVie and Mick Fleetwood. "The Chain" began as a Christine McVie song, titled "Keep Me There", which was the first track Fleetwood Mac recorded for Rumours. Initial tracking took place on 2 February 1976, with Fleetwood on drums, John McVie on an Alembic bass, Christine McVie on organ, and Buckingham on a Fender Stratocaster. Ten microphones were placed around Fleetwood's drums, two were used to capture the bass guitar and the organ, and another three microphones captured Buckingham's guitar amplifiers. After the band rehearsed the song twice, Ken Caillat, who served as the producer for Rumours, recorded the band's third run-through. In the middle of this take, John McVie played the bassline that was ultimately used in the final version of "The Chain". The ending section was the only part from the original recording that the band kept for "The Chain". McVie recorded a vocal take that session and replaced it with a new vocal the following day.

Throughout the Rumours sessions, "The Chain" remained in a state of incompletion. According to Buckingham, the song was almost omitted from Rumours. When the band revisited the song, they decided to rework it creating new verses. They removed the blues-style motif originally found on the verses and retained the chord progression. Lindsey Buckingham recycled the intro of an earlier song from a duet with Nicks, "Lola (My Love)", originally released on their self-titled 1973 album. During the verses, Buckingham instructed Fleetwood to play a straight quarter note pattern on the kick drum. The Dobro, a type of resonator guitar, supplied the verse riff.

Stevie Nicks had written the lyrics separately, which were originally part of an entirely different song that included the words "if you don't love me now, you will never love me again". Buckingham asked Nicks to donate these lyrics for the verses, which she agreed to. Nicks and McVie then reworked lyrics to create the first section of the tune. Nicks' lyrics referenced the breakup of her relationship with Buckingham, a theme of many of Nicks' and Buckingham's lyrics on Rumours. Buckingham said that the song was retitled "The Chain" "because it was a bunch of pieces."

Due to the spliced nature of the record (the drums and guitar were the only instruments recorded in each other's company) and its sporadic composition and assembly from different rejected songs, "The Chain" is one of only a few Fleetwood Mac songs whose authorship is credited to all members of the band at the time. Nicks maintained that "The Chain" was primarily her song and claimed ownership of the melody and a large portion of the lyrics. In an interview with Paul Zollo, Buckingham questioned whether Fleetwood contributed significantly to the song, but acknowledged that all five members nonetheless received writing credits. The finished song has a basic rock structure with two distinct portions: the main verse and chorus, and the outro. Influences of hard rock, folk, and country are also present.

== Release and reception ==
"The Chain" has received favourable reviews from music critics. In his 1977 review for Rumours, Bud Scoppa wrote in Phonograph Record that the song was a "powerful heart-break-rocker credited to the whole band". The Guardian and Paste ranked the song number ten and number one, respectively, on their lists of the 30 greatest Fleetwood Mac songs. Billboard placed the song sixth out of eleven on its list ranking every track on Rumours, calling the song a cornerstone of Fleetwood Mac's discography and highlighting the "heartbeat-like bass drum" and John McVie's bass playing during the coda.

In 1997, Fleetwood Mac released a live album called The Dance, which featured the reunion of the Rumours-era Fleetwood Mac members. The live version of "The Chain" was released to US active rock stations on 23 September 1997. That album's rendition of "The Chain" reached number 30 on the Billboard Mainstream Rock Tracks chart. Additionally, the studio version began appearing on the British charts in 2009, where it debuted at number 94. Two years later, the song achieved a new peak position of number 81. Since then, "The Chain" has returned to the British charts on several occasions; in 2025, it surpassed its old peak position by reaching number 67 in the UK. The song has been certified 6× Platinum by the British Phonographic Industry (BPI) for sales and streams of over 3,600,000 units.

== Personnel ==
- Lindsey Buckingham – electric guitar, Dobro, vocals
- Stevie Nicks – vocals
- Christine McVie – harmonium, Hammond organ, vocals
- John McVie – fretless bass guitar
- Mick Fleetwood – drums, tambourine

== Charts ==
=== The Dance version ===
Chart (1997)	Peak position
Canada Top Singles (RPM)	51
Canada Rock/Alternative (RPM)	22
US Mainstream Rock Airplay (Billboard)	30

=== Original version ===
==== Weekly charts ====
Chart (2011)	Peak position
UK Singles (Official Charts)	81

Chart (2017–2026)	Peak position
Australia (ARIA)	46
Global 200 (Billboard)	102
Greece International (IFPI)	61
Ireland (IRMA)	59
Netherlands (Single Top 100)	64
Norway (IFPI Norge)	91
Scotland (OCC)	55
Sweden (Sverigetopplistan)	87
UK Singles (Official Charts)	67
US Hot Rock & Alternative Songs (Billboard)	7

==== Year-end charts ====
Chart (2017)	Position
US Hot Rock & Alternative Songs (Billboard)	79
Chart (2020)	Position
US Hot Rock & Alternative Songs (Billboard)	85
Chart (2025)	Position
UK Singles (OCC)	62

== Certifications and sales ==
Region	Certification	Certified units/sales
Denmark (IFPI Danmark)	Gold	45,000^{‡}
Germany (BVMI)	Gold	300,000^{‡}
Italy (FIMI)	Gold	50,000^{‡}
New Zealand (RMNZ)	10× Platinum	300,000^{‡}
Spain (Promusicae)	Platinum	100,000^{‡}
United Kingdom (BPI)	6× Platinum	3,600,000^{‡}
United States digital	—	721,186
United States digital Remastered LP version	—	260,541
Streaming
Greece (IFPI Greece)	2× Platinum	4,000,000^{†}
^{‡} Sales+streaming figures based on certification alone.^{†} Streaming-only figures based on certification alone.

== Other media ==
The ending of "The Chain"
The ending as used by the BBC's Formula 1 coverage and other media outlets

The BBC's Formula One coverage used the ending bass line as a theme tune from 1978 until 1996 and again from 2009 to 2015, thus making the song highly recognisable in the United Kingdom. On 29 March 2009, the song re-entered the UK Chart at number 94 through downloads, following confirmation from the BBC that it would be reintroduced, the BBC having regained broadcasting rights from ITV. On 20 March 2011, "The Chain" peaked higher at number 81 in the UK chart following a campaign on Facebook to try to get the song to number 1 for the start of the 2011 Formula One season. Excerpts from The Chain were also used in the official trailer for the film F1 (2025), a film based around Formula One.

In the 2017 Marvel Studios film, Guardians of the Galaxy Vol. 2, director James Gunn has said that "The Chain" was "most deeply embedded into the fibers of the film". "The Chain" was also used as the closing song to the first-season episode "We Gull Way Back" of the HBO Max series Our Flag Means Death, and featured prominently in the 2017 film I, Tonya.

== Tantric cover ==
"The Chain"

Single by Tantric

from the album After We Go
- Released: February 10, 2004
- Recorded: January 2004
- Studio: The Blue Room
- Length: 4:21
- Label: Maverick
- Songwriters: Lindsey Buckingham; Mick Fleetwood; Christine McVie; John McVie; Stevie Nicks
- Producer: Toby Wright

Tantric singles chronology
"Hey Now" (2003)	"The Chain" (2004)	"After We Go" (2004)

Music video
- "The Chain" on YouTube

"The Chain" was covered by the American rock band Tantric, released as the second single from their 2004 second album, After We Go. Tantric recorded "The Chain" after their label insisted that they record additional material, where it was one of the three songs that emerged from the session. Their cover peaked at number 36 on the US Mainstream Rock chart.

Tantric's cover of "The Chain" was produced by long-time Alice in Chains producer Toby Wright~~.~~

Tantric's cover of the song was used as the theme song for the 2004 HBO Documentary series Family Bonds.

=== Charts ===
Chart performance for "The Chain"
Chart (2004)	Peak position
US Mainstream Rock Airplay (Billboard)	36
US Active Rock (Billboard)	37
US Heritage Rock (Billboard)	22

== Three Days Grace cover ==
"The Chain"

Song by Three Days Grace

from the EP Lost in You
- Released: 15 March 2011
- Recorded: 2011
- Length: 3:50
- Label: Jive
- Songwriters: Lindsey Buckingham; Mick Fleetwood; Christine McVie; John McVie; Stevie Nicks
- Producer: Howard Benson

The song was recorded by the Canadian rock band Three Days Grace, released from their EP, Lost in You. It was released on 15 March 2011. The song peaked at number 45 on the Rock Digital Song Sales chart.

=== Charts ===
Chart performance for "The Chain"
Chart (2011)	Peak position
US Rock Digital Song Sales (Billboard)	45

== Evanescence cover ==
"The Chain"

Single by Evanescence
- Released: 22 November 2019
- Recorded: 2019
- Length: 4:12
- Label: BMG
- Songwriters: Christine McVie; John McVie; Lindsey Buckingham; Mick Fleetwood; Stevie Nicks
- Producer: Bobby Tahouri

Evanescence singles chronology
"Hi-Lo" (2018)	"The Chain" (2019)	"Wasted on You" (2020)

Music video
- "The Chain" on YouTube

American rock band Evanescence released a cover version of the song. The song was released as a standalone digital download on 22 November 2019 by BMG. (This cover version had been used to promote the Xbox game Gears 5 – part of the Gears of War franchise – which was released in early September 2019.)

=== Background ===
Amy Lee, the lead vocalist of Evanescence, said: "This cover was so fun to make. We love Fleetwood Mac and wanted to paint a dark and epic picture with our take on 'The Chain'. The lyrics make me feel the power of standing together against great forces trying to pull us apart, perhaps even from the inside. I really wanted to drive that home in our version, and even made everyone in the band sing by the end of it! We're beyond excited to share this with our fans and I'm really looking forward to playing it live."

=== Music video ===
An official music video to accompany the release of "The Chain" was first released onto YouTube on 9 January 2020.

=== Track listing ===
Digital download
No.	Title	Length
1.	"The Chain" (From "Gears 5")	4:12

=== Charts ===
Chart (2019–20)	Peak position
Czech Republic (Modern Rock)	16
Scottish Singles Sales (Official Charts)	61
UK Singles Sales (OCC)	53
UK Singles Downloads (Official Charts)	53
US Digital Song Sales (Billboard)	20
US Hot Rock & Alternative Songs (Billboard)	9
US Mainstream Rock Airplay (Billboard)	36

=== Release history ===
Region	Date	Format	Label
United States	22 November 2019	Digital download	BMG
