= Tantric (album) =

Studio album by Tantric
- Released: February 13, 2001
- Recorded: 2000
- Genres: Post-grunge; alternative rock
- Length: 47:29
- Label: Maverick
- Producer: Toby Wright

Tantric chronology
Tantric (2001)	After We Go (2004)

Singles from Tantric
- 1. "Breakdown" Released: May 21, 2001; 2. "Astounded" Released: July 17, 2001; 3. "Mourning" Released: 2001

Tantric is the debut studio album by American rock band Tantric. It was released February 13, 2001, and debuted at No. 193 on the Billboard 200. The album would eventually peak at No. 71 and was gold by the RIAA on November 30, 2001. The album released "Breakdown" as the lead single, and the follow-up singles "Astounded" and "Mourning".

== Background and recording ==
In November 1998, after a turbulent relationship on the road, Todd Whitener, Jesse Vest, and Matt Taul were fired from the band Days of the New. The day they were fired, the three were cutting instrumental demos for what would become songs on Tantric. However, in the meantime, Whitener, Vest, and Taul would have to survive through low-wage jobs.

In March 1999, singer Hugo Ferreira moved to Nashville, Tennessee, and within their first practice session together the group began developing songs. Within six months, the band had written a plethora of material and quickly gained a strong fan base in their native Louisville, Kentucky. After the band's demo caught the attention of Maverick Records late the following year, they were signed and began recording their self-titled album with producer Toby Wright.

=== Musical style ===
The album emphasizes acoustic guitar and harmonized vocal melodies which are reminiscent of Days of the New. This style was also heavily influenced by Wright, who is known for applying multi-track vocals to much of his work.

== Touring and promotion ==
The band toured extensively to promote their debut album, including a headlining tour in early and fall 2001. From April to August that year, they supported 3 Doors Down with Lifehouse, and in May took part in the first two-day HFStival. On May 11, Tantric performed "Breakdown" on Late Night with Conan O'Brien.

The Kentucky group joined Oleander and Beautiful Creatures on the Rolling Rock Town Fair tour from September through November. They also appeared on HBO's Reverb in late 2001. They would perform on The Tonight Show with Jay Leno on December 28.

Tantric was chosen to join Creed for the first two months of 2002. They then embarked on a headlining effort in the Rellim Tour, sponsored by Miller Beer, in spring 2002. Afterward, Tantric would reenter the studio to record their second album.

Music videos were produced for all three singles from the album. "Breakdown" and "Astounded", which were led by director Nigel Dick, feature a more abrasive, confrontational rock sound while "Mourning" takes on a power ballad approach. The latter was featured in the end credits of the 2002 neo-noir film The Salton Sea while "Breakdown" was in advertising and the soundtrack to Driven.

== Critical reception ==
Professional ratings
Review scores
Source	Rating
AllMusic	1.5/5 stars
The Encyclopedia of Popular Music	3/5 stars
Los Angeles Times	2/4 stars
Melodic	3/5 stars
The Michigan Daily	C+
The Philadelphia Inquirer	2/4 stars
The Press of Atlantic City	3.5/4 stars
Wall of Sound	77/100

Mixed reviews were offered to Tantric's debut. Most negative feedback lay on the grounds that the album lacks a unique sound and rather mimics grunge dynamics and, more specifically, Alice in Chains. Much attention was also brought to the few musical distinctions between Tantric and Days of the New. However, the album also gained a measure of praise for its strong, commercially viable melodies and sturdy rock/pop balance.

== Commercial performance ==
Tantric is the band's only album to land on the Billboard Heatseekers, peaking at No. 4, and it reached No. 71 on the Billboard 200. In November 2001, the record had sold 500,000 copies and was certified gold, a landmark that the band has been unable to repeat.

All three singles managed to chart with the lead release, "Breakdown", reaching the highest of any Tantric single: No. 1 on the Mainstream Rock Tracks (their only number-one single on any chart to date) and at No. 4 on the Modern Rock Tracks. "Astounded" and "Mourning" both reached the top 20 and 30 on the Mainstream and Modern Rock charts, respectively, and gained significant radio play. Few later Tantric singles would reach these heights.

== Track listing ==
All tracks are written by Tantric.

No.	Title	Length
1.	"Breakdown"	3:10
2.	"Live Your Life (Down)"	4:30
3.	"I Don't Care"	3:41
4.	"Paranoid"	3:37
5.	"Revillusion"	3:30
6.	"Mourning" (featuring string arrangements by David Campbell)	4:20
7.	"Astounded"	4:21
8.	"I'll Stay Here"	4:11
9.	"Frequency"	4:00
10.	"All to Myself"	3:45
11.	"Hate Me"	3:21
12.	"Inside Your Head"	5:05

B-sides
No.	Title	Length
1.	"Cliché"	3:20
2.	"Foresight"	4:48

== Personnel ==
Tantric

- Hugo Ferreira – lead vocals
- Todd Whitener – guitar, backing vocals
- Jesse Vest – bass
- Matt Taul – drums

Additional personnel

- Toby Wright – producer, engineer, mixing
- Sander Dejong – assistant engineer
- Kevin Szymanski – assistant engineer
- Elliott Blakey – assistant mix engineer
- Stephen Marcussen – mastering
- Stewart Whitmore – digital editing

== Charts ==
=== Weekly charts ===
Chart (2001)	Peak position
US Billboard 200	71
US Heatseekers Albums (Billboard)	4

=== Year-end charts ===
Chart (2001)	Position
US Billboard 200	199

== Certifications ==
Certifications for Tantric
Region	Certification	Certified units/sales
United States (RIAA)	Gold	500,000^{^}
^{^} Shipments figures based on certification alone.^{‡} Sales+streaming figures based on certification alone.
