= DV8 (band) =

American alternative rock band

- DV8 circa 2005

Background information
- Genres: Alternative rock Pop rock Punk rock
- Years active: 2002–2006
- Labels: FFROE
- Members: Cash Kelley; John Cade; David Sposito
- Website: dv8rock.com

DV8 was an American alternative rock band formed in Midlothian, Texas, United States, in 2002. The band consisted of Cash Kelley (vocals, guitar), John Cade (drums), and David Sposito (bass, back-up vocals). In 2004, the band released its debut EP, A Sip of What is to Come. That same year, a promotional DVD was produced by one of the bands sponsors, Monster Energy. In 2005, they were invited to perform at the Download Festival in England's Donington Park. DV8 split up in 2006.

The band was managed by Bowling For Soup frontman Jaret Reddick.

== History ==
Lead singer Cash founded DV8 in 2002 recruiting his friends, John Cade, and David Sposito. They began playing at small venues in the area surrounding their hometown of Midlothian, Texas. Eventually, they went on to play larger stages and venues, including 2004 Warped Tour, the Freakers Ball, and the Download Festival in the UK.

Throughout their career, DV8 played shows with many notable acts, including Simple Plan, All American Rejects, Bowling For Soup, Fall Out Boy, Mest, and Matchbook Romance. Receiving high acclaim, Monster Energy and Ernie Ball were among many high-profile companies to sponsor the band.

In June 2004, the band released their debut EP entitled A Sip of What is to Come. The EP was recorded at Yellow Dog Studios by Zac Maloy of The Nixons. Plans were in motion to record a full-length album, however, the group disbanded before this could happen.

Cash went on to other projects, including fronting the Texas band Hermosa, and is currently the owner and designer of Custom Chaos Art in Dallas, Texas.

== Discography ==
=== EPs ===
- A Sip of What is to Come (2004)

== Members ==
Band members

- Cash Kelley – vocals, guitar
- John Cade – drums
- David Sposito – bass guitar, vocals
- Jaret Reddick – Manager

== See also ==
- List of alternative rock artists
