= Question Everything =

Single by 8stops7

from the album In Moderation
- Released: 2000
- Recorded: 1998–1999
- Genre: Alternative rock; post-grunge
- Length: 4:28
- Label: Warner Bros.
- Producers: Paul Lani; David Kahne; Toby Wright

8stops7 singles chronology
"Satisfied" (1999)	"Question Everything" (2000)

"Question Everything" is a song recorded by the American rock band 8stops7, from their 1999 album In Moderation. It was released in 2000 as a single. The song reached the US rock charts, peaking at number sixteen on Mainstream Rock Tracks, at number 25 on Modern Rock Tracks and at 38 on the Billboard Hot Adult Top 40 chart. The song has a music video.

== Chart performance ==
Chart (2000)	Peak position
U.S. Billboard Mainstream Rock Tracks	16
U.S. Billboard Modern Rock Tracks	25
U.S. Billboard Adult Top 40	38
