= A Sip of What Is to Come =

EP by DV8
- Released: June 2004
- Recorded: June 2–7, 2004, Yellow Dog Studios, Tulsa, Oklahoma, U.S.
- Genre: Alternative rock
- Length: 14:57
- Label: FFROE
- Producer: Zac Maloy

A Sip of What Is to Come EP is the debut EP by American alternative rock band DV8, which was recorded and released in June 2004. It was produced by The Nixons frontman Zac Maloy. The release coincided with a three night stint at the Warped Tour on June 25–27, 2004.

All songs were written by lead singer Cash Kelley, except "Dumb Romantic", which was co-written with producer Zac Maloy. The final 'untitled' track is studio banter between the three band members.

== Track listing ==
No.	Title	Length
1.	"As We Go"	3:22
2.	"2am (You Make it Hard)"	3:53
3.	"Dumb Romantic"	2:20
4.	"Take Another Sip"	4:59
5.	"Untitled"	0:23
Total length:		14:57

== Personnel ==
DV8

- Cash Kelley – vocals, guitar
- John Cade – drums
- David Sposito – bass guitar, vocals

Additional personnel

- Zac Maloy – vocals
- Mark Haugh – vocals
- Kelly Kerr – photography

Production

- All songs written by Cash Kelley, except Dumb Romantic written by Cash Kelley and Zac Maloy
- Produced by Zac Maloy
- Recorded at Yellow Dog Studios in Tulsa, Oklahoma, USA
- Mixed by David Percefull and Zac Maloy
- Art direction by Cash Kelley and Mark Haugh
