= One More Try =

One More Try may refer to:

== Film ==
- One More Try (film), a 2012 Filipino romantic drama

== Music ==
=== Albums ===
- One More Try: An Anthology, by Gregg Allman, 1997
- One More Try: The Collection, by Timmy T, 2006

=== Songs ===
- "One More Try" (Brighton Rock song), 1988
- "One More Try" (George Michael song), 1988
- "One More Try" (Kristine W song), 1995
- "One More Try" (Timmy T song), 1990
- "One More Try", by Richard Marx from Paid Vacation, 1994
- "One More Try", by the Rolling Stones from Out of Our Heads, 1965
- "One More Try", written by Max Martin for the musical & Juliet, 2019
