= Take a Deep Breath =

Take a Deep Breath may refer to:

- Take a Deep Breath (film), a 2004 Serbian film
- Take a Deep Breath (album), an album by Brighton Rock

== See also ==
- Deep breathing, or diaphragmatic breathing
