= Toby Wright (music producer) =

American record producer and mixing engineer

Toby Wright is an American record producer and mixing engineer who has worked with artists such as Alice in Chains, Kiss, Korn, and Sevendust.

== Partial list of credits ==
Year	Artist	Album	Producer	Mixer	Engineer
1988	Robben Ford	Talk to Your Daughter	No	Yes	No
1988	Metallica	...And Justice for All (album)	No	No	Yes
1991	Brighton Rock	Love Machine	Yes	No	Yes
1993	Brad Gillis	Gilrock Ranch	Yes	Yes	Yes
1994	Slayer	Divine Intervention	Yes	Yes	Yes
1994	Corrosion of Conformity	Deliverance	No	Yes	No
1994	Alice in Chains	Jar of Flies	No	Yes	Yes
1995	The Nixons	Foma	No	Yes	No
1995	Chris Whitley	Din of Ecstasy	No	Yes	No
1995	Alice in Chains	Alice in Chains	Yes	Yes	No
1996	Alice in Chains	Unplugged	Yes	Yes	No
1997	Chris Whitley	Terra Incognita	Yes	Yes	No
1997	Kiss	Carnival of Souls: The Final Sessions	Yes	Yes	Yes
1997	Queensrÿche	Hear in the Now Frontier	No	Yes	Yes
1997	The Nixons	The Nixons	Yes	No	No
1998	Jerry Cantrell	Boggy Depot	Yes	Yes	Yes
1998	Korn	Follow the Leader	Yes	No	Yes
1998	Metallica	Garage Inc.	No	No	Yes
1998	Primus	Rhinoplasty	Yes	No	No
1999	Primus	Antipop	No	Yes	No
1999	Sevendust	Home	Yes	No	Yes
1999	8stops7	In Moderation	Yes	No	No
2000	3 Doors Down	The Better Life	No	Yes	No
2000	Alice in Chains	Live	No	Yes	No
2000	Soulfly	Primitive	Yes	No	No
2001	Mushroomhead	XX	No	Yes	No
2001	40 Below Summer	Invitation to the Dance	No	Yes	No
2001	Boy Hits Car	Boy Hits Car	No	Yes	No
2001	Oysterhead	The Grand Pecking Order	No	Yes	No
2001	Tantric	Tantric	Yes	Yes	Yes
2002	3rd Strike	Lost Angel	Yes	No	No
2002	Stone Sour	Stone Sour	No	Yes	No
2002	Trey Anastasio	Trey Anastasio	No	Yes	No
2002	Switched	Subject to Change	No	Yes	No
2002	Taproot	Welcome	Yes	No	Yes
2003	Grade 8	Grade 8	No	Yes	No
2003	Memento	Beginnings	Yes	No	No
2004	Tantric	After We Go	Yes	Yes	Yes
2004	Grade 8	Resurrection	No	Yes	No
2005	GZR	Ohmwork	No	Yes	No
2005	Fear Factory	Transgression	Yes	Yes	Yes
2005	Taproot	Blue-Sky Research	Yes	No	Yes
2006	Villebillies	Villebillies	Yes	No	No
2006	Switched	Ghosts in the Machine	No	Yes	No
2007	Meldrum	Blowin' Up the Machine	No	Yes	No
2007	Tarja Turunen	My Winter Storm	No	Yes	No
2007	3	The End Is Begun	No	No	Yes
2008	Linea 77	Horror Vacui	Yes	No	No
2008	In Flames	A Sense of Purpose	No	Yes	No
2008	Six Feet Under	Death Rituals	No	Yes	No
2008	Tantric	The End Begins	Yes	Yes	Yes
2010	Linea 77	10	Yes	Yes	No
2010	The Letter Black	Hanging On by a Thread	Yes	No	Yes
2010	Sonic Syndicate	We Rule the Night	Yes	Yes	Yes
2012	Biohazard	Reborn in Defiance	Yes	No	No
2013	The Letter Black	Rebuild	Yes	No	No
2017	Jibe	Epic Tales of Human Nature	No	Yes	No
