= Birth of a Cynic =

Studio album by 8stops7
- Released: 1998
- Genre: Alternative rock; post-grunge; hard rock
- Length: 43:11
- Label: Elephant Ear
- Producer: Paul Lani; Paul Yered

8stops7 chronology
Birth of a Cynic (1998)	In Moderation (1999)

Birth of a Cynic is the debut studio album by American rock band 8stops7 and the first independent release for the band. It was produced by Paul Lani and Paul Yered and released on Elephant Ear Records.

== Musicians ==
- Evan Sula-Goff (vocals, guitar)
- Seth Watson (guitar, background vocals)
- Adam Powell (drums, background vocals)
- Alex Viveros (bass, background vocals)

== Album artwork ==
Album artwork was photographed by Scott Council, who went on to a successful career in entertainment photography. The images were photographed in Ventura, California and Ojai, California. Marty Johnston was the graphic designer.

The booklet from original release was printed as a blue and black duotone on white paper with hidden elements in a high gloss varnish, while the reissue was printed in full color and had slightly different artwork.

Four of its tracks were re-recorded for the band's major label release In Moderation on Warner Bros. Records and Reprise Records. In 2007, three songs were featured in the short film He's Not My..., which was produced by Contempovision Films.

== Track listing ==
1. "Doubt" (3:50)
2. "Fate" (4:34)
3. "Esteem" (4:38)*
4. "Not Alive" (3:56)*
5. "Long Distance" (2:38)
6. "Wider" (3:24)*
7. "Wait I Swear" (3:48)
8. "What's the Big Idea" (4:15)
9. "Weekend" (4:46)
10. "Disappear" (3:51)
11. "Forget" (3:31)*

* Asterisk indicates song was re-recorded and included on the band's following album: In Moderation.

== Reception ==
A review in the Los Angeles Times gave Birth of a Cynic a grade of "B–", comparing the band to Soundgarden (except younger and with less money). The review called out the "growling vocals of Evan Sula-Goff, who somehow manages to prevent those veins in his neck from blowing up".
