= Rebuild (The Letter Black album) =

2013 studio album by the Letter Black

Studio album by The Letter Black
- Released: November 11, 2013
- Genre: Christian rock; hard rock; alternative rock
- Length: 38:56
- Label: Tooth & Nail
- Producer: Johnny K, Toby Wright

The Letter Black chronology
Hanging On by a Thread (2010)	Rebuild (2013)	Pain (2017)

Singles from Rebuild (2013)
- 1. "Sick Charade" Released: October 3, 2012; 2. "The Only One" Released: February 2013; 3. "Pain Killer" Released: September 10, 2013; 4. "Up from the Ashes" Released: February 4, 2014

Rebuild is the third album by The Letter Black. The album was released on November 11, 2013

== Overview ==
In early 2013, the band was reported to be recording new material for their second studio album, later revealed to be called Rebuild. The first single for the new album, "Sick Charade", was released on October 3, 2012. "The Only One" was released in February 2013 and "Pain Killer" was released on September 10, 2013. The album was initially scheduled to be released on April 23, 2013, however, on April 17, the album was postponed because the band decided to write three new songs for the album. The album was released on November 11, 2013.

== Critical reception ==
Professional ratings
Review scores
Source	Rating
Jesus Freak Hideout	2.5/5 stars
New Release Today	4/5 stars
HM	4/5 stars
Indie Vision Music	4/5 stars

== Track listing ==
No.	Title	Writer(s)	Length
1.	"Sick Charade"	M. Anthony, S. Anthony, S. Hogan	3:13
2.	"Break Out"	M. Anthony, S. Anthony, Johnny K	3:26
3.	"Pain Killer"	M. Anthony, S. Anthony, Skidd Mills	3:34
4.	"Found"	M. Anthony, S. Anthony, Johnny K.	4:07
5.	"Up from the Ashes" (Burn Halo cover)	D. Bassett, J. Hart	3:57
6.	"Outside Looking In"	M. Anthony, S. Anthony, M. Holman	4:07
7.	"Rebuild"	M. Anthony, S. Anthony, B. Vodihn	3:43
8.	"Smothering Walls"	M. Anthony, S. Anthony, S. Hogan, D. Williams	3:07
9.	"Shattered"	M. Anthony, S. Anthony, S. Hogan	4:07
10.	"Devil On Your Back"	M. Anthony, S. Anthony, S. Hogan	3:20
11.	"Branded"	M. Anthony, S. Anthony, S. Hogan	3:18
Total length:			38:56

Deluxe edition
No.	Title	Writer(s)	Length
12.	"The Only One"	M. Anthony, S. Anthony, S. Hogan	3:40

== Credits ==
The Letter Black

- Sarah Anthony – lead vocals
- Mark Anthony – lead and rhythm guitars, vocals
- Matt Beal – bass guitar
- Justin brown – drums

Production

- Johnny K – producer, engineering, mixing
- Toby Wright – co producer, engineering, mastering

== Charts ==
Chart (2013)	Peak position
US Billboard Top Christian Albums	32
