= Hanging On by a Thread =

2010 studio album by the Letter Black

Studio album by The Letter Black
- Released: May 4, 2010
- Genre: Christian rock; nu metal; hard rock; alternative rock
- Length: 44:39
- Label: Tooth & Nail
- Producer: Toby Wright, Rob Hawkings, Travis Wyrick

The Letter Black chronology
Breaking the Silence EP (2009)	Hanging On by a Thread (2010)	Rebuild (2013)

Singles from Hanging On by a Thread
- 1. "Best of Me" Released: Fall 2009; 2. "Hanging On by a Thread" Released: Winter 2009; 3. "Believe" Released: September 8, 2010; 4. "Fire with Fire" Released: February 28, 2011

Professional ratings
Review scores
Source	Rating
AllMusic	3/5 stars
Alpha Omega News	(B+)
Corezine.net	9/10 stars
The Christian Manifesto	(3.25/5)
TheChristianRock20	4/5 stars
Christian Music Zine	(B−)
Jesusfreakhideout.com	2/5 stars
The New Review	4/5 stars
RockTheCross.net	7.5/10 stars
UltimateGuitar.com	(8.7/10)

Hanging On by a Thread is the second album by The Letter Black. It is their first album to be released on Tooth & Nail Records and their first album to not be released independently. The album was released on May 4, 2010, and has sold over 100,000 copies in the United States by 2011.

The album entered the Billboard Top Christian Albums chart at No. 10.

== Track listing ==
This album includes "Moving On", "Hanging On by a Thread" and "Best of Me" from the Breaking the Silence EP.

No.	Title	Length
1.	"Fire with Fire"	3:06
2.	"Invisible"	3:20
3.	"Hanging on by a Thread"	3:03
4.	"Believe"	4:01
5.	"There'll Come a Day"	3:23
6.	"My Disease"	2:56
7.	"I'm Just Fine"	2:50
8.	"Best of Me"	3:46
9.	"All I Want"	3:21
10.	"Moving On"	3:39
11.	"More to This"	4:21
12.	"Care Too Much"	3:22
13.	"Wounded"	3:25
Total length:		43:39

Deluxe edition
No.	Title	Length
14.	"Useless Alibis"	3:04
15.	"Collapse"	3:37
16.	"While You're Away"	4:45
17.	"Away From Me"	3:37
18.	"Perfect"	4:03
Total length:		19:06

== Credits ==
'The Letter Black

- Sarah Anthony – vocals
- Mark Anthony – guitars, vocals
- Matt Beal – bass guitar

Additional musicians

- Kirke Jan – drums, percussion
- Matthew Johnson – cello
- Jeff Wilkin – piano

Production

- Toby Wright – producer, engineering, mastering
- Jr McNeely – mixing
- Randy Torres- A&R
- Brandon Ebel- executive producer

== Singles ==
The title track was released from the "Breaking the Silence EP" in 2009 and it charted at No. 10 on Christianrock.net. The second single, "Best of Me", charted in the Top 20 on the Weekend 22 chart. The third single from the album, "Believe", was released in September 2010. The band made a music video for "Hanging on by a Thread", which shows the band playing in a cluttered room. The band released a "Believe" music video on iTunes on November 17, 2010, which shows the band playing in a dark room, with screenshots of the silhouette of a cellist, and the band's lead singer, Sarah Anthony, escaping a dark room through a standalone door that leads into the light. The next single, "Fire With Fire", was released in February 2011 with an accompanying music video.

== Chart positions ==
Chart (2010)	Peak position
US Billboard 200	183
