= 3rd Strike (band) =

American nu metal band

- 3rd Strike in 2002. L–R: Todd Deguchi, Gabe Hammersmith, Jim Korthe, Erik Carlsson, P.J. McMullan

Background information
- Origin: Los Angeles, California, U.S.
- Genres: Nu metal; rap metal
- Years active: 1995–2004; 2007–2010
- Label: Hollywood
- Past members: Jim Korthe; Todd Deguchi; Erik Carlsson; PJ McMullan; Gabe Hammersmith; Evan Holtz; Sean McCormick; Nick Manning; Jeff Sharp; Dino Schumacher

3rd Strike was an American nu metal band, started by Jim Korthe (vocals), Todd Deguchi (guitar), Erik Carlsson (guitar), PJ McMullan (drums) and Gabe Hammersmith (bass). Their lyrics were primarily based upon the former lives of the group's members. In May 2002, they released their debut and only album, Lost Angel. They toured with Ozzfest and Warped Tour to promote their album, but broke up shortly after. Their song "Into Hell Again" was featured on the Tomb Raider: Cradle of Life soundtrack.

== History ==
=== Early incarnations and Dimestore Hoods (1988–2000) ===
The earliest incarnation of 3rd Strike was formed by vocalist Jim Korthe and his childhood friend, guitarist Todd Deguchi, in 1988. Under the moniker Dimestore Hoods, the band also consisted of second guitarist Tom McNerney, bassist Joe Puccio and drummer Mike Russo. Dimestore Hoods were picked up by MCA Records in 1995 and subsequently released their one-and-only album, the self-titled Dimestore Hoods. During the supporting tour, MCA requested they return home to write a new album. In response, the band asked to be released from their contract, to which the label agreed and compensated the band accordingly.

Dimestore Hoods went through several lineup changes, but the core duo of Jim Korthe and Todd Deguchi remained intact. Eventually, the band was renamed as 3rd Strike with the lineup consisting of Korthe and Deguchi alongside guitarist Erik Carlsson, drummer PJ McMullan and bassist Gabe Hammersmith. The name itself relates to the three strikes law in the US and members of Korthe's former gang, who were serving time for a third strike offence.

"This has to do with the 'three strikes you're out' felony law. Three felonies mean life in prison. I used to run with a gang here in LA from about '88 to '95 and a lot of my friends are down on their third strike doing a lot of time for it. I have seen a lot of people going down for their third strike for like smoking a cigarette in county jail, that's a felony... that's why we named the band that." – Lead vocalist Jim Korthe on the meaning behind the band's name.

=== Lost Angel and breakup (2001–2004) ===
3rd Strike began recording demos in a studio owned by Pennywise guitarist Fletcher Dragge, who previously knew Korthe and Deguchi from their days in Dimestore Hoods. Impressed by what he heard, particularly with the song No Light, he handed the band's demo to his manager, who subsequently signed the band. A matter of weeks later, the band were performing a showcase for several different labels at the Whisky a Go Go club in Los Angeles. One of the labels in attendance was Hollywood Records, who visited the band's rehearsal space and offered a recording contract after witnessing the performance of several songs.

To help the new band build their reputation and organic following, 3rd Strike were sent on at least three dates of the 2001 Vans Warped Tour.

With famed producer Mudrock at the helm, 3rd Strike spent the latter half of 2001 recording their debut album, Lost Angel. After the band had initially thought they'd finished recording the album, Hollywood Records stepped in and requested the band record a cover of the Black Sabbath song Paranoid for the film Ultimate X. The band re-entered the studio, only this time with Toby Wright handling production. Coincidentally, Wright was the band's original choice for producing their album, but scheduling conflicts had initially stopped this from happening and forced them to work with Mudrock. The Ultimate X soundtrack ended up using the original version of Paranoid in its soundtrack, but the band and label were impressed enough with their cover version that it became a last-minute addition to the album.

To help build hype for the upcoming album, Hollywood Records released a four-track Selections from Lost Angel sampler in 2001.

May 2002 saw the release of Lost Angel, supported by the singles No Light and Redemption. The band toured the US on both the Warped Tour and Ozzfest that summer before heading to Europe for additional dates.

Songs by 3rd Strike were featured in the PlayStation title Delta Force Urban Warfare in 2002. An instrumental version of Flow Heat in the main menu and a looped and sped up version of Redemption in the game's first mission near a car.

In 2003, 3rd Strike released the Japan-exclusive EP Barrio Raid. The EP did not contain any new material, but instead consisted of B-side material that didn't make it onto Lost Angel, as well as a live recording of the song All Lies (recorded live at Ozzfest) and a demo version of the opening track Barrio Raid.

By 2004, the band had broken up though reasons for the breakup still remain a mystery.

=== Reunion and Jim Korthe's death (2007–2010) ===
In January 2007, 3rd Strike posted the following message on Myspace, "Hey everyone just wanted to post an update on whats going on. We've been pretty busy tightening up our set so we can start getting out and playing some shows. Were all really excited about getting out and playing live cause that is where all the hard work pays off. Hopefully we'll have some new pics to post up soon and some more info asap. Thanx."

Later in 2007, the band released a new single in Battlecry, accompanied by the B-side Life Goes On. Interestingly, the single is listed on Discogs as being released via Hollywood Records, though this is likely to be a listing error.

By August 2007 the band debuted the new single "Battlecry" on Myspace followed by a promo for the Peaceful Valley, "Life Goes On".

In June 2008 drummer Sean McCormick was replaced by Nick Manning on drums. Later that year the group debuted the new song, "Revolution" taken from a 3 song Pre-Production demo of a new album.

Lead singer Jim Korthe died in his San Pedro home on January 13, 2010, at the age of 39. According to local news, he had fallen ill around Christmas time and was under the care of a doctor. His cause of death was never announced, and neither were his toxicology reports.

== Discography ==
=== Albums ===
List of studio albums, with selected chart positions
Title	Details	Peak chart positions
Title	Details	US
Lost Angel	Released: May 14, 2002; Label: Hollywood; Format: CD	72

=== EPs ===
- 2003 – Barrio Raid EP (Japan-only)
- 2007 – Battlecry EP

=== Singles ===
List of singles, with selected chart positions, showing year released and album name
Title	Year	Peak chart positions			Album
Title	Year	US Active	US Main	US Modern	Album
"No Light"	2002	17	23	36	Lost Angel
"Redemption"	2002	31	40	—	Lost Angel
"—" denotes a recording that did not chart or was not released in that territory.
