= Bend (8stops7 album) =

Studio album by 8stops7
- Released: April 19, 2006
- Genre: Alternative rock; post-grunge; hard rock
- Length: 57:58

8stops7 chronology
In Moderation (1999)	Bend (2006)	Fables (2012)

Bend is the third studio album by American rock band 8stops7 and the follow-up to their previous, and most successful release, In Moderation.

== Track listing ==
1. "Breathing Room" – 4:11
2. "A Waking Contradiction" – 3:52
3. "Here Among the Wicked" – 3:00
4. "This Is Complete Surprise" – 5:37
5. "Filler" – 3:25
6. "Impatiently – 4:19
7. "Settled-Down Spin" – 4:57
8. "Fragile Accident" – 3:31
9. "Need" – 6:06
10. "Greetings from the Other Side" – 3:03
11. "Distance and the Waving" – 4:02
12. "Reasonance" – 3:39
13. "To Remain Here" – 3:15
14. "Counting Each Step and the Space Between" – 5:01

== Personnel ==
- Evan Sula-Goff (vocals, guitar)
- Seth Watson (guitar, background vocals)
- Adam Powell (drums, background vocals)
- Alex Viveros (bass, background vocals)

== See also ==
- 8stops7 discography
