= Submersed =

American rock band

- Origin: Stephenville, Texas, U.S.
- Genres: Hard rock; post-grunge; alternative metal; alternative rock
- Years active: 2001–2008, 2021–present
- Label: Wind-up
- Past members: Donald Carpenter; TJ Davis; Kelan Luker; Garrett Whitlock; Eric Friedman

Submersed (sometimes typeset as SubmerseD) is an American rock band from Stephenville, Texas. They first disbanded in 2008, reuniting in late 2021, early 2022.

== History ==
Submersed was signed to Wind-up Records, and worked with Alter Bridge guitarist Mark Tremonti on its debut studio album, In Due Time, which featured the singles "You Run", "Hollow", and the title track. In support of the album, the band performed in several cities across the US and Canada, sharing stages with Trapt, Crossfade, Seether, Rob Zombie, Chevelle, Mudvayne, Taproot, Alter Bridge and others.

After a short break and the departure of guitarist Eric Friedman, the band continued work on their second studio album with producer Rick Beato. Their sophomore and final album, Immortal Verses was released on September 18, 2007, and featured two singles: "Better Think Again" and "Price of Fame". The band toured the US again, sharing stages with 12 Stones, Evans Blue, Fuel and others.

As disclosed in a blog on Submersed' Myspace, the band parted ways and was dropped from Wind Up Records. In the blog entry written by vocalist Donald Carpenter, he explained the breakup:

I know that all of you are wondering, what happened to Submersed? Well, the answers is... A lot.. This business and struggle to make it took its toll on the members... Two weeks before "Price of Fame" was slated for release, Tj, Kelan and Justin decided to move on with their lives and left SubmerseD. Garrett and I believing in "Price of Fame" made the choice to press on and see what could happen. Well, nothing happened... the single never had a chance... mind bottling... The fact is, is that a majority of our fanbase is unaccounted for due to Burning, making it impossible for the labels to understand just how many people really support us out there... When it comes down to it now, SubmerseD no longer has a place on Windup's roster and will be dropped shortly... I was trying to wait until things were a little more official before an announcement but you guys and gals are smart and I felt you deserved an explanation now rather than later.

On November 24, 2008, the band posted a blog on their MySpace that simply said "SUBMERSED WILL BE BACK!" No other details have been disclosed.

== Break-up ==
After the disbanding of Submersed, Donald Carpenter joined Million Man Army with Mike Moye and Nothing In Return with Lance Arny. After Million Man Army disbanded and Donald left Nothing In Return, he formed Eye Empire with former Dark New Day members, Corey Lowery and B.C. Kochmit., but as of April 2014 was no longer a member. Donald later became the vocalist for the band Apollo Under Fire.

As of November 2020, Donald Carpenter had finished recording the debut album of his new project Blisskrieg, along with guitarist Todd Whitener, bassist Jesse Vest, and drummer Matt Taul, all former members of the bands Days of the New and Tantric. In early 2021, they released their album 'Remedy'.

Eric Friedman played lead guitar for the Los Angeles band Daughters of Mara. After Daughters of Mara disbanded, Eric joined Creed as a touring guitarist during their 2009 and 2010 tours. In 2012, he is currently a member of the supergroup Projected and of Tremonti as well, which also features Submersed drummer Garrett Whitlock.

== Reunion ==
On March 4, 2019, SubmerseD had a partial reunion as Donald Carpenter, Eric Friedman, and Kelan Luker played a one-off acoustic set of SubmerseD songs for "Lukerpalooza," a benefit/remembrance concert for Seth Luker, SubmerseD's longtime manager (and Kelan's brother). The show took place at the Twisted J Live in Stephenville, Texas, and also featured sets by Drowning Pool, Tremonti, and others. They played a 6 song acoustic set, including To Peace, Dripping, Flicker, You Run, Unconcerned, and Hollow.

On late 2023-early 2024 the band begun to work on new music, sharing news and media related via official social media. On September 11, 2024 the band released the EP Grand Illusion Army, their first new material in 17 years since their last record.

== Members ==
- Donald Carpenter – vocals (2003–2008)
- Garrett Whitlock – drums (2003–2008)
- TJ Davis – rhythm guitar (2003–2008)
- Kelan Luker – bass (2003–2008)
- Aaron Young – lead guitar, backing vocals (2003)
- Eric Friedman – lead guitar, backing vocals (2003–2006)
- Justin Finley – lead guitar, backing vocals (2006–2008)
- Josh Hissem - drums (2003)

== Discography ==
- In Due Time (2004) (No. 16 Billboard Heatseekers Albums)
- Immortal Verses (2007) (No. 35 Billboard Heatseekers Albums)
- Grand Illusion Army (2024)

=== Singles ===
Year	Title	Chart positions	Album
Year	Title	US Mainstream Rock	Album
2003	"You Run"	—	In Due Time
2004	"Hollow"	19	In Due Time
2005	"In Due Time"	31	In Due Time
2007	"Better Think Again"	36	Immortal Verses
2008	"Price of Fame"	—	Immortal Verses

=== List of other songs ===
- "Complicated" featured in soundtrack of The Punisher.
- "Broken Man", "Leave" and "Come To Me" from All Things Becoming of an End album
- "Holyland", a very early version of "Flicker". The song is a completely different one on its own, and sounds nothing like Flicker, but it does share the lyrics for the chorus, and the odd melody can be heard on "In Due Time". It has been performed live.
- "Lonely Road", "Everything", and "Keep You Waiting" are B-sides from Immortal Verses
- "Guilty Pleasure" is a possible B-side from Immortal Verses, but is not known.
- "You Run" single contains two different versions of "You Run" other than the In Due Time version.
- "Best Of Me" is an unreleased track from 2003.
- An acoustic version of "Come To Me" from 2003-2004.
- "O Holy Night" -- origin unknown.
- "Into The Sun", "A Breath Away" and "Wait" were performed live during a concert on Tampa in 2008. These songs later re-recorded and used Donald Carpenter's upcoming bands at that time, Million Man Army and Apollo Under Fire.
- "Finding You", a very early version of "Unconcerned".
- "My Last Goodbye" is an unreleased track from 2003.
- "Seam" -- origin unknown.
- "Who You Are?" is an unreleased track which performed live only once. Live recording is available
- "You Know Everything?", "Inquistion", "Inside These Songs", "My Pen is Mightier Than Sword", "Messenger", "See You in Heaven", "We Stand Alone" and "Coward" are unreleased demo songs recorded during Immortal Verses sessions. They were all shared on the band's myspace page.
- "The Rescue" is a instrumental track recorded during In Due Time sessions.
- "Can't Make It On My Own" was performed live during a concert on Tampa in 2008. This song later was re-recorded in the studio as solo performance of Donald Carpenter.
- Metallica's "For Whom to Bell Tolls?" was performed live several times during concerts.
