= Young, Wild and Free =

Studio album by Brighton Rock
- Released: 1986
- Recorded: 1985
- Genre: Hard rock
- Length: 39:57
- Label: Warner Music Group
- Producer: Michael Wagener

Brighton Rock chronology
Brighton Rock (1985)	Young, Wild and Free (1986)	Take a Deep Breath (1988)

Singles from Young, Wild and Free
- 1. "We Came to Rock" Released: 1987; 2. "Can't Wait for the Night" Released: 1987

Young, Wild and Free is the first studio album by Canadian rock band, Brighton Rock. The album was released in 1986, and spawned the Canadian hit singles; "We Came to Rock" and "Can't Wait for the Night". The album charted at No. 82 in Canada and was certified Gold by the CRIA in 1989. Gerry McGhee announced on April 30, 2013 that Young, Wild and Free will be remastered by Warner Records.

== Track listing ==
All songs by Gerry McGhee and Greg Fraser.

1. "Young, Wild and Free"
2. "We Came to Rock"
3. "Change of Heart"
4. "Can't Wait for the Night"
5. "Assault Attack"
6. "Jack is Back"
7. "Save Me"
8. "Nobody's Hero"
9. "Barricade"
10. "Rock 'n' Roll Kid"

== Personnel ==
Brighton Rock

- Gerry McGhee – vocals
- Greg Fraser – guitars
- Steve Skreebs – bass guitar
- Johnny Rogers – keyboards
- Mark Cavarzan – drums

Production

- Michael Wagener – producer

== Charts ==
Chart (1987)	Peak position
Canada Top Albums/CDs (RPM)	82

== Certifications ==
Region	Certification	Certified units/sales
Canada (Music Canada)	Gold	50,000^{^}
^{^} Shipments figures based on certification alone.
