= In Due Time =

Studio album by Submersed
- Released: September 28, 2004
- Recorded: 2003–2004
- Genre: Hard rock; alternative metal; post-grunge
- Length: 47:25
- Label: Wind-up
- Producer: Don Gilmore; Mark Tremonti; Kirk Kelsey

Submersed chronology
In Due Time (2004)	Immortal Verses (2007)

Singles from In Due Time
- 1. "Hollow" Released: September 14, 2004; 2. "In Due Time" Released: 2005

Professional ratings
Review scores
Source	Rating
Allmusic	3.5/5 stars

In Due Time is the 2004 debut studio album by Submersed, a hard rock band from Stephenville, Texas. The album was originally titled All Things Becoming of the End. The album was recorded and mixed, but eventually scrapped and renamed as the band began writing new material that they felt was far better. The song "Divide the Hate" was featured on the video game NASCAR 2005: Chase for the Cup.

== Track listing ==
No.	Title	Writer(s)	Producer(s)	Length
1.	"Hollow"	Donald Carpenter; TJ Davis; Eric Friedman; Kelan Luker	Don Gilmore	4:04
2.	"To Peace"	Carpenter; Davis; Friedman; Luker; Don Gilmore	Gilmore	4:06
3.	"In Due Time"	Carpenter; Davis; Friedman; Luker; Don Gilmore	Gilmore	4:03
4.	"Dripping"	Carpenter; Davis; Friedman; Luker; Josh Hissem	Kirk Kelsey; Mark Tremonti	4:38
5.	"Flicker"	Carpenter; Luker; Friedman	Kelsey; Tremonti	5:16
6.	"Parallelism"	Carpenter; Davis; Luker	Kelsey; Tremonti	3:47
7.	"Deny Me"	Carpenter; Luker	Kelsey; Tremonti	3:34
8.	"You Run"	Carpenter; Gilmore; Davis; Friedman; Luker; Aaron Young	Gilmore	4:09
9.	"Divide the Hate"	Carpenter; Davis; Friedman; Luker; Gilmore	Gilmore	4:27
10.	"Piano Song"	Carpenter	Kelsey; Tremonti	3:56
11.	"Unconcerned"	Carpenter; Friedman; Hissem	Kelsey; Tremonti	5:16

== Personnel ==
Submersed

- Donald Carpenter – vocals, piano (10)
- Eric Friedman – guitar, background vocals
- TJ Davis – guitar
- Garrett Whitlock – drums (1–3, 8, 9)
- Kelan Luker – bass

Additional musicians

- Scott Phillips – drums and percussion (4–7, 10, 11)
- Kirk Kelsey – mandolin and keyboards (4–7, 10, 11)
- Brody Martinez – additional vocal arrangements (4–7, 10, 11)
- Mark Tremonti – guitar intro (5)

Technical personnel

- Zach Blackstone – assistant engineer (1–3, 8, 9)
- Don Gilmore – engineer (1–3, 8, 9)
- Ernie Hudson – guitar technician (4–7, 10, 11)
- Kirk Kelsey – engineer and mixing (4–7, 10, 11)
- Ted Jensen – mastering
- Seth Luker – studio assistant (4–7, 10, 11)
- Daniel Mendez – engineer (1–3, 8, 9)
- Jon O'Brien – programming (1–3, 8, 9)
- Shilpa Patel – Pro Tools engineer (4–7, 10, 11)
- Fox Phelps – assistant engineer (1–3, 8, 9)
- Mark Prator – digital editing (4–7, 10, 11)
- Randy Staub – mixing (1–3, 8, 9)

Artistic personnel

- Joaquin Cortez – album artwork
- Clay Patrick McBride – photography
- Brook Pifer – photography
