= Break the Silence =

Break the Silence may refer to:

- Break the Silence (Alana Grace album), and the title track
- Break the Silence (Beyond the Black album), and the title track
- Break the Silence (Van Canto album), the fourth album by Van Canto
- "Break the Silence" (Jason Hartman song), debut single by South African Jason Hartman
- "Break the Silence" (Thomas Ring song), 2011
- "Break the Silence!", a song by Galneryus from their 2026 album A Cry from the Sky Above
- "Break the Silence", a song by Heavenly from their 2001 album Sign of the Winner
- "Break the Silence", a song by Killswitch Engage from their 2006 album As Daylight Dies
- "Break the Silence", a song by Seventh Wonder from their 2008 album Mercy Falls
- "Break the Silence", a song by Thousand Foot Krutch from their 2003 album Phenomenon
- Break The Silence, winner of Community Music Clip at the 2016 Australian National Indigenous Music Awards by the Ngukurr community

== See also ==
- Breaking the Silence (disambiguation)
