= Foma (album) =

1995 studio album by the Nixons

Studio album by The Nixons
- Released: May 23, 1995
- Recorded: One and One and Devonshire Studios, N. Hollywood, CA
- Genres: Alternative rock, post-grunge, grunge
- Label: MCA
- Producers: Mark Dodson, The Nixons

The Nixons chronology
Halo (1994)	Foma (1995)	The Nixons (1997)

Singles from Foma
- 1. "Sister" Released: 1996; 2. "Wire" Released: 1996

Foma is the second album by the American band the Nixons, released in 1995. Its title was inspired by the 1963 novel Cat's Cradle, by Kurt Vonnegut. "Foma" is defined in the album's liner notes as "harmless untruths intended to comfort simple souls; lies." Foma has sold more than 500,000 copies.

The Nixons supported the album by touring with Gravity Kills. "Sister" was a hit on alternative rock radio.

== Production ==
Recorded in Hollywood, the album was produced by Mark Dodson and the band. Seven of the tracks are rerecorded songs from the band's debut; of the remaining six, only three were written specifically for Foma.

== Critical reception ==
Professional ratings
Review scores
Source	Rating
AllMusic	4/5 stars

AllMusic staff writer Erik Crawford wrote "Foma opens with a scream and then delivers a hard rock romp that will delight fans of the heavy alternative genre". The St. Petersburg Times praised the "aggressively hard-rockin' yet intelligent borderline metal sound." The Dallas Morning News labeled Foma "old-fashioned big-statement rock with big-statement chords."

The Dallas Observer called the album "enervating musically and downright silly and infuriating lyrically ... Which means, in short, they ain't no damn good any way you slice it." The Santa Fe New Mexican concluded that "with the exception of 'Sister', none of the 13 cuts on Foma stand out either musically or lyrically; they are not particularly distinguishable from the general din that is modern rock radio." The Philadelphia Inquirer deemed the band "pleasantly derivative."

== Track listing ==
All songs by The Nixons/Lyrics by Zac Maloy except where indicated.

1. "Foma" – 3:13
2. "Head" – 4:05
3. "Sweet Beyond" – 3:32
4. "Sister" – 4:28
5. "Smile" – 4:07
6. "JLM" (Jesus Loves Me) (William Batchelder Bradbury/Anna Bartlett Warner) – 0:24
7. "Fellowship" – 4:12
8. "Wire" – 5:15
9. "Trampoline" – 4:44
10. "Drink the Fear" – 4:36
11. "Blind" – 5:56
12. "Passion" – 4:28
13. "Happy Song" – 6:18

== Personnel ==
- Ricky Brooks – bass
- Jesse Davis – guitar
- Zac Maloy – guitar, vocals
- John Humphrey – drums

=== Additional personnel ===
- C.J. DeVillar – engineer
- Mark Dodson – engineer, producer
- Willie Dowling – string arrangements
- Eric Fischer – mixing assistant
- Kelle Musgrave – production coordination
- Eddy Schreyer – mastering
- Michele Sepe – angel's voice
- Mike Stock – engineer
- Glenn Tipton – guitar solo on "Drink the Fear"
- Toby Wright – mixing

== Charts ==
Album – Billboard (United States)

Year	Chart	Position
1996	The Billboard 200	77

Singles - Billboard (United States)

Year	Single	Chart	Position
1996	"Sister"	Alternative Songs	11
