= Love Machine (album) =

Studio album by Brighton Rock
- Released: 1991
- Recorded: 1991
- Genres: Hard rock, Heavy metal
- Length: 49:21
- Label: Warner Music Group
- Producer: Toby Wright

Brighton Rock chronology
Take a Deep Breath (1988)	Love Machine (1991)	A Room for Five Live (2002)

Singles from Love Machine
- 1. "Hollywood Shuffle" Released: 1991

Love Machine is the third and final studio album by Canadian rock band, Brighton Rock. The album was released in 1991. It is the final studio album to feature vocalist Gerry McGhee before his death on August 25, 2020.

== History ==
Before the album was recorded, the band's keyboardist, Johnny Rogers, departed the band. Brighton Rock wanted a harder sound, with lead vocalist Gerry McGhee stating, "We didn't really feel that keyboards were part of us anymore. There's really no place for them in our musical direction now." Rogers was replaced for touring purposes by a second guitar player, Greg Bioleau, who previously played with McGhee in his first band, The Rockers.

The album failed to chart, but the single "Hollywood Shuffle" charted at #6 on the Cancon: To Watch chart. In 1992 the album was nominated for a Juno Award for Hard Rock Album of the Year. Cocaine was recorded live in the studio with one take.

== Track listing ==
1. "Bulletproof"
2. "Hollywood Shuffle"
3. "Love Machine"
4. "Still the One"
5. "Mr. Mistreater"
6. "Nightstalker"
7. "Love in a Bottle"
8. "Nothin' to Lose"
9. "Heart of Steel"
10. "Cocaine"
11. "Magic is Back"

=== Unreleased tracks ===
1. "Gang Bang"
- According to vocalist Gerry McGhee, the track "Gang Bang" was dropped by Warner Canada for lyrical content, even though the same label released "Get The Fuck Out" by Skid Row at the same time.

== Personnel ==
Brighton Rock

- Gerry McGhee – vocals
- Greg Fraser – guitars
- Steve Skreebs – bass guitar
- Mark Cavarzan – drums

Production

- Toby Wright – producer and engineering

== Charts ==
=== Singles ===
Year	Song	Chart	Highest
1991	"Hollywood Shuffle"	Cancon: To Watch	#6
