= Beginnings (Memento album) =

Studio album by Memento
- Released: 25 February 2003
- Recorded: 2002
- Studio: Larrabee East; Los Angeles, CA
- Genre: Hard rock, alternative metal, nu metal
- Length: 54:51
- Label: Columbia
- Producer: Toby Wright

Singles from Beginnings
- 1. "Nothing Sacred" Released: 12 May 2003; 2. "Saviour" Released: 29 September 2003

Professional ratings
Review scores
Source	Rating
AllMusic	3/5 stars

Beginnings is the only studio album by Australian hard rock band Memento. The album was released on 25 February 2003 through Columbia Records. The singles "Nothing Sacred" and "Saviour" both had music videos and achieved moderate success on the US mainstream rock chart. The track "Nothing Sacred" appeared in the EA Sports video game NASCAR Thunder 2004.

== Track listing ==
No.	Title	Length
1.	"Nothing Sacred"	4:25
2.	"Saviour"	3:27
3.	"Beginnings"	5:09
4.	"Shell"	4:30
5.	"Abyss"	4:43
6.	"Below"	4:35
7.	"Reflections" (instrumental)	1:51
8.	"Blister"	6:08
9.	"Coming"	2:59
10.	"Stare"	4:14
11.	"Figure 8"	12:50
Total length:		54:51
