= One More Try (Brighton Rock song) =

Single by Brighton Rock

from the album Take a Deep Breath
- A-side: "One More Try"
- B-side: "Shootin' For Love / Young at Heart (Alabamma Slamma)"
- Released: 1988
- Recorded: 1988
- Genre: Hard rock
- Length: 3:54
- Label: WEA
- Songwriters: Gerry McGhee, Johnny Rogers
- Producer: Jack Richardson

Brighton Rock singles chronology
| "Can't Wait for The Night" (1987) | "One More Try" (1988) | "Hangin' High 'N' Dry" (1988) |

"One More Try" is a hit single, released in 1988 by Canadian band Brighton Rock. The song appears on their 1988 album Take a Deep Breath. "One More Try" is Brighton Rock's most successful single, with heavy airplay on Canadian radio it peaked at number 15 in Canada. The song was also ranked #16 on "Top 25 Cancon singles of '88".

== Track listing ==
1. "One More Try"
2. "Shootin' for Love"
3. "Young at Heart (Alabamma Slamma)"

== Music video ==
The band shot a music video for their song "One More Try". The video features the band performing in a studio. The video features Canadian supermodel Monika Schnarre who is seen in the video taking pictures of the band while they perform. At the end of the video she can be seen playing guitar.

== Personnel ==
- Gerry McGhee – vocals
- Greg Fraser – guitars
- Steve Skreebs – bass guitar
- Johnny Rogers – keyboards
- Mark Cavarzan – drums

== Charts ==
| Chart (1988–1989) | Peak position |
|---|---|
| Canada Top Singles (RPM) | 15 |
