= In Moderation =

Studio album by 8stops7
- Released: October 12, 1999
- Genre: Alternative rock; post-grunge; hard rock; alternative metal; nu metal
- Length: 47:09
- Label: Reprise
- Producer: Paul Lani; David Kahne; Toby Wright

8stops7 chronology
Birth of a Cynic (1997)	In Moderation (1999)	Bend (2006)

Singles from In Moderation
- 1. "Question Everything" Released: 2000; 2. "Satisfied" Released: 2000

Professional ratings
Review scores
Source	Rating
AllMusic	3/5 stars

In Moderation is the second studio album by American rock band 8stops7 and the major label debut for the band. Four songs on this album were re-released and had been included on the band's debut album, Birth of a Cynic. Their initial release on Birth of a Cynic fell below expectations with only 2,000 albums being produced and no songs from it being issued as a single.

The release of In Moderation spawned a redefining of the band's success entailing a national (US) tour, with several exceeding 15,000 patrons. The album sold in excess of 150,000 copies in its first year of release.

The band's members, Evan Sula-Goff, Seth Watson, Adam Powell, and Alex Viveros are attributed equal credit for writing the songs on In Moderation, while the four which had appeared on Birth of a Cynic were originally attributed to Evan Sula-Goff; considered, in the AMG musical review for In Moderation, to be the band's solidifying member.

== Chart performance ==
In Moderation charted on the US Billboard Top Heatseekers chart, peaking at number 34 on the year 2000, and produced two singles, "Question Everything" and "Satisfied", respectively achieving numbers 25 and 35 on the US Billboard Modern Rock Tracks chart, and numbers 16 and 26 on the US Billboard Mainstream Rock chart. "Question Everything" also reached number 38 on the US Billboard Adult Top 40 chart.

== Personnel ==
Band

- Evan Sula-Goff (vocals, guitar)
- Seth Watson (guitar, background vocals)
- Adam Powell (drums, background vocals)
- Alex Viveros (bass, background vocals)

Additional musicians

- The Water Sisters – background vocals on hidden track

=== Support and technical ===
- Producers: Paul Lani; David Kahne; and Toby Wright
- Audio mixers: David Bianco; Paul Lani
- Editor: Stewart Whitmore
- Photographers: Michael Lewis; Jack Gould

== Track listing ==
- In Moderation: total track time, (47:09)
1. "Satisfied" (3:05)
2. "Not Alive" (3:38)*
3. "Question Everything" (4:28)
4. "Regression" (3:05)
5. "Good Enough" (3:11)
6. "Better" (3:26)
7. "Uninspired" (3:48)
8. "Esteem" (4:20)*
9. "Wider" (3:07)*
10. "My Would-Be Savior" (2:52)
11. "Forget" (12:09)*

* Asterisk indicates four songs previously released on the band's debut album, Birth of a Cynic (1997).

=== Hidden track ===
The album's 11th track, listed as the last song, "Forget", tracks for (12:09). "Forget" actually fades out at (4:22) and is followed by (3:45) of silence. Then an unlisted track, titled "Empty", begins to play and tracks for the remaining (4:02). This hidden track features the background vocals of the Water Sisters, and a piano accompaniment played by Gary Sula-Goff.
