= Pain (The Letter Black album) =

Studio album by The Letter Black
- Released: May 26, 2017
- Recorded: 2016–2017
- Genres: Christian rock; hard rock; alternative rock; alternative metal
- Length: 48:46
- Label: EMP Label Group
- Producer: Mark Anthony

The Letter Black chronology
Rebuild (2013)	Pain (2017)	The Letter Black (2021)

Singles from Pain
- 1. "Last Day That I Cared" Released: April 28, 2017

Pain is the fourth album by American Christian rock band The Letter Black. The album was released on May 26, 2017. It was the first album under the band's current name to be released independently.

== Overview ==
On November 19, 2016, the band previewed a new song on their Facebook page for their upcoming fourth studio album which will be released by early 2017. According to the band, this will be their heaviest album to date. They announced that they had left Tooth & Nail Records and would record their next album independently. The band ran a successful $25,000 Kickstarter campaign to record the album. On February 7, 2017, they released a full-length demo for the album. The band signed with EMP Label Group on March 14, 2017. They announced that the album title would be Pain and the cover art was also revealed. The first single, "Last Day That I Cared", was premiered on Revolver on April 28, 2017. A lyric video for "Rock's Not Dead", was premiered via Facebook on May 19, 2017.

== Critical reception ==
The album received generally positive reviews. Mary Nikkel, staff editor of New Release Today, wrote, "Pain sees The Letter Black navigating into a heavier rock sound with a sense of renewed energy and intensity that lends fire to the lyrical themes of fighting back against anything preventing us from reaching hope." She noticed that the "album packed with fight songs". She mentioned the track "Last Day That I Cared" as an "anthem pushing back against the harmful opinions of others as well as against our own internal demons..." CCM magazine said, "No noticeable drop-off's [sic] in production value, and the band really sounds as if they’ve rejuvenated their efforts just for you." It later praised the track "Last Day That I Cared". Rob J of Indie Vision Music calls the album "a blistering array of songs that are sure to please just about anyone who is into hard rock."

Professional ratings
Review scores
Source	Rating
New Release Today	3.5/5 stars
CCM magazine	3.5/5 stars
Indie Vision Music	4/5 stars
Jesus Wired	85%

== Track listing ==
All tracks are written by Mark Anthony, except where noted.

No.	Title	Writer(s)	Length
1.	"Fear"		3:45
2.	"Last Day That I Cared"	M. Anthony, Stacy Hogan	3:26
3.	"Pain"	M. Anthony, Sarah Anthony	3:34
4.	"Rock's Not Dead"		3:26
5.	"Kill the Devil"	M. Anthony, Sarah Anthony	3:46
6.	"Meant for You"	M. Anthony, S. Anthony	3:43
7.	"Alive"		4:59
8.	"Rise from the Dead"		3:10
9.	"Tear You Apart"		3:27
10.	"Breathe"		3:44
11.	"I Am"		3:26
12.	"Holding On"		7:06
Total length:			48:46

== Personnel ==
All credits from Allmusic.

The Letter Black

- Mark Anthony - lead and rhythm guitars, vocals, engineer, producer, programming, bass
- Sarah Anthony - lead and unclean vocals
- Justin Brown - drums

Addition personnel

- Jay Pfeifer - string arrangements
- Paul Pavão, Ben Grosse - mixing
- Ted Jensen - mastering
- Rick Fike - artwork, digital editing
- Brandon Hay - assistant arranger
- Natascha Pehur - photography

== Charts ==
Chart (2017)	Peak position
US Album Sales (Billboard)	86
US Christian Albums (Billboard)	6
US Independent Albums (Billboard)	11
