= 8stops7 =

American rock band

- Origin: Ventura, California, U.S.
- Genres: Alternative rock; post-grunge
- Years active: 1996–present
- Labels: Reprise (1996–2001); Wendigo (2017–present)
- Members: Evan Sula-Goff; Seth Watson; Rodney Amieva; Cory Tarallo; Adam Powell
- Past members: Alex Viveros; Aaron Johnson; Paul Wickstrom
- Website: 8stops7.com

8stops7 is an American rock band from Ventura, California.

== Background ==
8stops7 formed in Ventura, California, in 1996. The band's unusual name is the result of some intentionally vague number symbolism. According to band members, the "8" in 8STOPS7 resembles the infinity symbol, while the number seven represents a host of unpleasant, limiting things like the seven days of the week, the seven years of bad luck, and seven plagues. Said vocalist Evan Sula-Goff, "Basically, seven is a symbol of something you want to get away from, and eight is the door you go through to get there."

After self-releasing their first self-produced album Birth Of A Cynic, the band signed with Warner Bros. Records/Reprise Records under the Warner Music Group umbrella in 1999 through their manager.

Their second album In Moderation was produced by Toby Wright (KoRn, Alice In Chains, Sevendust) and included re-recordings of four songs from the previous album. Two of the songs from In Moderation, "Satisfied", and "My Would-be Savior", were featured on the soundtrack of the Sony PlayStation game Street Sk8er 2. "Satisfied" was also featured in the Sony PlayStation 2 game Gran Turismo 3 and on its soundtrack. The video for "Satisfied" was featured on the MTV show 120 Minutes. "Question Everything" was featured on the Friends Again Soundtrack with other artists featured on the Friends NBC sitcom. Apple placed the music video for Question Everything on the Mac OS 9.1 CD, and later included a high-quality mp3 copy of the song to demo the new digital speakers included with the PowerMac G4 Cube. To date, In Moderation has sold more than 400,000 copies, enjoyed widespread national radio airplay, and spawned two hits that landed on three different Billboard charts.

In 2002, when Time Warner, the parent company of 8Stops7's record label, merged with AOL, every artist who hadn't sold 1 million albums in the previous year was dropped with a promise of being re-signed in 2003. The rumor that Warner did not want to deal with the band's manager anymore turned out to be false. Due to new politics, new executives and new opinions, the band was not re-signed. Because of the manager and agency's continued faith and belief in the band they continued to tour and be booked by the William Morris Agency with the hopes to secure another deal. The band spent the next few years working to separate themselves from their manager to accomplish their new goals.

After raising money from fans through the pledgemusic.com website, the band released their fourth album Fables on February 8, 2012. The album's first single is titled "The Sting". "To come back as hard as this band has with Fables is not only to believe in yourself but to know who you are, unequivocally....From the first track to the last, Fables is exactly the kind of post-grunge melodic rock that's expected of this band, only better...8stops7 is unattached and arena-ready. Get it." Michelle Cicero, writing for the VCReporter

On their official Facebook page in 2012 the separation of Alex Viveros as bassist of the band was announced, being replaced by the current bassist Cory Tarallo.

After some publications of their performances at different rock festivals and performances in bars and outdoor venues.

The current line-up consists of all four original members, singer Evan Sula-Goff, guitarist Seth Watson, bassist Cory Tarallo, and percussionist Adam Powell along with guitarist Rodney Amieva. On February 24, 2015, the band uploaded a video to their networks of about 8 seconds of a very small fragment of a track from a new song that was there. recorded at that time. On April 1, 2017, the band announced they had been signed by Wendigo records and were slated to enter the studio in July to record a new yet unnamed record. Between the months of May, June and July 2017 they published that they had already written 9 songs in total.

== Discography ==
=== Studio albums ===
- Birth of a Cynic (1997)
- In Moderation (1999)
- Bend (2006)
- Fables (2012)

=== Singles ===
| Year | Title | Chart positions | | | Album |
| Year | Title | US Alt. | US Mainstream Rock | US Adult Top 40 | Album |
|---|---|---|---|---|---|
| 2000 | "Question Everything" | 25 | 16 | 38 | In Moderation |
| 2000 | "Satisfied" | 35 | 26 | — | In Moderation |
