= Kelan Luker =

American football player, coach, and musician

Kelan Luker (born December 18, 1980) is a former American football player and rock musician and a current American football coach. He played at the quarterback position for Southern Methodist University and at the bass guitar position for the band Submersed.

== Football player ==
Luker is from Stephenville, Texas, where he was an All-Texas quarterback while competing for the Stephenville High School football team. Kelan led Stephenville to a Texas State 4A Title in 1998. He was named 4A Player of the Year and Dave Campbell's Quarterback of the Decade. Kelan received a scholarship to play for Southern Methodist University.

== Bass player ==
After two years with SMU, Luker left football to play bass guitar in the Dallas based band Submersed. With the band, Luker re-located to Florida and with the help of then-former Creed guitarist Mark Tremonti, the band signed a record deal with Wind-up Records. Submersed found success with the release of two full-length albums, In Due Time and Immortal Verses.

== Return to football ==
In April 2008, Luker announced that with two years of eligibility left, he planned on returning to college football to play for Tarleton State University. On August 28, 2008, Luker made his debut with Tarleton State in a 51–10 victory over the Savage Storm of Southeastern Oklahoma.

In 2013, Luker was working as a quarterbacks coach in Florida. He has previously trained the quarterbacks coach at Stephenville High School in Stephenville, Texas and Magnolia, Texas.
