= After We Go =

Studio album by Tantric
- Released: February 24, 2004
- Recorded: April 2002–2003
- Studio: Ocean Way Nashville
- Genre: Post-grunge
- Length: 48:30
- Label: Maverick
- Producer: Toby Wright

Tantric chronology
Tantric (2001)	After We Go (2004)	The End Begins (2008)

Singles from After We Go
- 1. "Hey Now" Released: December 9, 2003; 2. "The Chain" Released: February 10, 2004; 3. "After We Go" Released: July 1, 2004

After We Go is the second studio album by American rock band Tantric. Released on February 24, 2004, it debuted at number 56 on the Billboard 200 but quickly lost momentum due to the lack of a strong single. Despite the lack of radio play, the album was considered a commercial success by singer Hugo Ferreira because it fared extremely well through downloaded sales. After We Go would be Tantric's final album for Maverick.

== Background and recording ==
After wrapping up a headlining tour on April 7, 2002, the band went to Ocean Way studios in Nashville, Tennessee to record their second album with producer Toby Wright. The band expected to release the new work, originally to be titled Zero Point Mantra, by year's end.

After two long sessions, however, the label insisted Tantric to return to the studio and continue. The third session churned out three more songs including the singles "Hey Now" and "The Chain". Singer Hugo Ferreira noted of the experience, "This record was a long and painful process to make. We were under a lot of pressure from our label to spit something out." The band contemplated recording a cover and simply chose the first song they heard on classic rock radio, "The Chain". At this point, the tentative release date was set at February 10, 2004.

Ferreira wrote the lead single, "Hey Now", with Extreme guitarist Nuno Bettencourt. The two both grew up in Hudson, Massachusetts, and their moms were friends, so Ferreira would spend time with Bettencourt's nephews and play his guitars. They eventually met up in Los Angeles where Ferreira asked Bettencourt to write with him.

== Music and lyrics ==
On After We Go, the second Tantric production by Toby Wright, the band continued their rather distinctive method of blending well-layered melodic vocals over distorted guitars. This often leads to comparisons with Seattle group Alice in Chains, whom Wright had famously worked with. The album is slightly heavier as a whole, with the opener "Chasing After" setting the stage for the whole album. Guitarist Todd Whitener provides more vocals than on the previous album, including the lead in the chorus of the title track, "After We Go".

Ferreira described Tantric's second album as "more mature" and "definitely heavier". He described current issues such as the invasion of Iraq and a struggling economy as helping "give this record its own soul." Corresponding with the album's aggressive theme, the lead single was described by Ferreira as "kind of a 'You did me wrong, so f--- you' song."

== Critical reception ==
Professional ratings
Review scores
Source	Rating
AllMusic	2/5 stars
The Encyclopedia of Popular Music	3/5 stars
Exclaim!	unfavorable

After We Go received largely negative reviews from critics. Johnny Loftus of AllMusic gave the album 2-out-of-5 and described it as following the same format as Tantric. He noted its strong comparison to Alice in Chains and that After We Go exhibits the band to be no more than "mid-level grunge revisionists." Amber Authier of Exclaim! gave a poor review despite feeling that it "improves upon their self-titled debut." She noted, "the opening track is worth a couple of listens. Unfortunately the rest is not."

== Commercial performance ==
Sales of After We Go would exceed 200,000 units, a far cry from Tantric's debut effort. The album peaked on the Billboard 200 at number 56, higher than its more successful predecessor. Aside from "Hey Now", which reached number eight on the Mainstream Rock Tracks, its singles did not chart substantially.

== Touring and promotion ==
A music video was produced for the single "Hey Now", which predated the album's release. The follow-up singles, the title track and a cover of Fleetwood Mac's "The Chain", also met with poor reception. Nevertheless, Tantric soldiered on, touring with 3 Doors Down and Shinedown for much of 2004.

Tantric's cover of Fleetwood Mac's "The Chain" became the theme song for HBO's Family Bonds. The opening track, "Chasing After", was also featured in the video games WWE Day of Reckoning and WWE SmackDown! vs. Raw in fall 2004.

== Track listing ==
All tracks are written by Tantric (Hugo Ferreira, Todd Whitener, Matt Taul, and Jesse Vest), except where noted.

No.	Title	Writer(s)	Length
1.	"Chasing After"		3:31
2.	"After We Go"		4:21
3.	"Falling Away"		4:23
4.	"Hey Now"	Ferreira; Whitener; Taul; Vest; Nuno Bettencourt	3:28
5.	"Hero"		4:25
6.	"The Chain" (Fleetwood Mac cover)	Lindsey Buckingham; Mick Fleetwood; Christine McVie; John McVie; Stevie Nicks	4:21
7.	"Change the World"		3:27
8.	"Just Once"		4:56
9.	"Relentless"		3:11
10.	"Alright"		4:22
11.	"Before"		4:27
12.	"Awake"		3:32

== Personnel ==
Tantric

- Hugo Ferreira – lead vocals
- Todd Whitener – guitar, backing vocals
- Jesse Vest – bass
- Matt Taul – drums

Additional personnel

- Toby Wright – producer, engineer, mixing
- Elliott Blakey – additional engineering
- Leslie Richter – additional engineering, assistant engineer (2, 4, 6)
- Mike Eleopolis – assistant mixing engineer
