= Take a Deep Breath (album) =

Studio album by Brighton Rock
- Released: 1988
- Recorded: 1988
- Genre: Hard rock
- Length: 48:36
- Label: Warner Music Group
- Producer: Jack Richardson

Brighton Rock chronology
Young, Wild and Free (1986)	Take a Deep Breath (1988)	Love Machine (1991)

Singles from Take a Deep Breath
- 1. "One More Try" Released: 1988; 2. "Hangin' High 'N' Dry" Released: 1988; 3. "Can't Stop the Earth from Shaking" Released: 1989

Professional ratings
Review scores
Source	Rating
Hi-Fi News & Record Review	B:3

Take a Deep Breath is the second studio album by Canadian rock band Brighton Rock. The album was released in 1988. Take a Deep Breath is Brighton Rock's most commercially successful album, peaking at #22 on the Canadian album chart. The album was also certified Gold by the CRIA. Gerry McGhee announced on April 30, 2013 that Take a Deep Breath will be remastered by Warner Records.

== Track listing ==
All songs by Gerry McGhee and Greg Fraser, except where indicated.

1. "Can't Stop the Earth from Shaking" - 4:28
2. "Outlaw" - 4:57
3. "Hangin' High 'N' Dry" (McGhee, Fraser, Johnny Rogers) - 3:54
4. "One More Try" (McGhee, Rogers) - 3:53
5. "Ride the Rainbow" - 4:19
6. "Rebels With a Cause" - 4:21
7. "Power Overload" (Greg Boileau, McGhee, Fraser) - 4:18
8. "Who's Foolin' Who" - 4:21
9. "Love Slips Away" - 4:13
10. "Shootin' for Love" - 4:03
11. "Unleash the Rage" - 5:13

== Personnel ==
Brighton Rock

- Gerry McGhee – vocals
- Greg Fraser – guitars
- Steve Skreebs – bass guitar
- Johnny Rogers – keyboards
- Mark Cavarzan – drums

Production

- Jack Richardson – producer
- Andrew Scarth – mixing

== Charts ==
Chart (1989)	Peak position
Canada Top Albums/CDs (RPM)	22

== Certifications ==
Region	Certification	Certified units/sales
Canada (Music Canada)	Gold	50,000^{^}
^{^} Shipments figures based on certification alone.
