= Brighton Rock (band) =

Canadian hard rock band

- Origin: Niagara Falls, Ontario, Canada
- Years active: 1982–1992, 2001–2020
- Label: WEA
- Past members: Greg Fraser; Stevie Skreebs; Johnny Rogers; Mark Cavarzan; Gerry McGhee; Martin Victor
- Website: www.brightonrock.ca

Brighton Rock was a Canadian rock band, who released three albums in their home country during the 1980s and 1990s. They broke up in 1991, before reuniting and releasing a live album in 2002.

== History ==
The band was formed in 1982 in Niagara Falls by guitarist Greg Fraser and bassist Stevie Skreebs, along with vocalist Gerry McGhee, keyboardist Martin Victor and drummer Mark Cavarzan. Initially, the band's name was Heart Attack. After their song "Breakin' Down The Barricade" was included in CILQ's 1984 Q107 Homegrown compilation, they changed their name to Brighton Rock and released the EP Brighton Rock the following year.

They signed to WEA for their 1986 debut album, Young, Wild and Free, which was produced by Michael Wagener with pre-production assistance from Jack Richardson. By this time, Martin Victor had left to join a band called Buxx, and been replaced on keyboards by Johnny Rogers. Young, Wild and Free spawned the Canadian hit singles "We Came to Rock" and "Can't Wait for the Night". The album charted at No. 82 in Canada and was certified gold in 1989.

In 1988, Brighton Rock released the album Take a Deep Breath, which was produced entirely by Richardson. This was the band's most commercially-successful album. In Canada, it peaked at No. 22 and was No. 11 on the Top 50 Cancon Albums of '89. Its singles, "One More Try", "Hangin' High & Dry" and "Can't Stop the Earth from Shakin'" charted at No. 38, No. 77 and No. 65. Following its release, the band toured the UK for the first time.

While writing for their next album, the band realized that they no longer needed keyboards. McGhee stated, "We didn't feel that keyboards were part of us anymore. There's really no place for them in our musical direction."

Fraser noted:

We definitely did not want to repeat ourselves on that record, and keyboards were becoming too polished sounding for what was being released at the time. A lot of tougher sounds were becoming more popular with the likes of Guns N' Roses, and Skid Row, and keyboards were considered uncool, and wimpy. Most of the new songs I was writing did not lend themselves to keyboards.

Rogers left the band and replaced for touring purposes by a second guitarist, Greg Bioleau, who had played in McGhee's first band, The Rockers. At the Juno Awards of 1990, Brighton Rock was nominated as Most Promising Group of the Year--the award went to The Tragically Hip.

In 1991, Brighton Rock released the album Love Machine. The album didn't chart, but the single "Hollywood Shuffle" earned the No. 6 spot on the Cancon: To Watch chart. The band toured Ontario to support the album, then broke up. Their last show was at the Toronto nightclub Spectrum in June 1992. As Fraser explained, they were suffering from a combination of burn-out from an exhausting touring schedule, and frustration at not being able to break into the US market. They had fired their manager and could not find someone who could help them move to the next level. McGhee decided to move to Los Angeles; Fraser joined Helix. At the Juno Awards of 1992, Love Machine was nominated as Hard Rock Album of the Year.

The band regrouped for a reunion tour in 2001, releasing the live album A Room for Five Live in 2002. In 2006 a greatest hits package was released titled The Essentials. In 2007, Fraser and Skreebs formed a band called Fraze Gang and released the album Fraze Gang in 2008. A Brighton Rock EP called Don't Call Us was announced for release in 2009, but it did not materialize.

The band regrouped again Thursday October 30, 2008, at the Phoenix Concert Theatre in Toronto for a benefit concert for fellow Canadian rocker Carl Dixon who was injured in a car crash. In 2013, they played the Firefest X Festival in England, and released the single and video for "Creatures of the Night", a re-imagining of the Kiss classic, for the fundraising album A World With Heroes (A Kiss Tribute For Cancer Care).

Brighton Rock has since played a couple of shows every year. Their last live shows were as part of the 2019 Monsters of Rock Cruise in Jamaica. Also in 2019, Brighton Rock released a new song, "End of Time".

On August 25, 2020, Gerry McGhee died of cancer.

== Discography ==
Studio albums

- Young, Wild and Free (1986), WEA
- Take a Deep Breath (1988), WEA
- Love Machine (1991), WEA

Live albums

- A Room for Five Live (2002), Z Records

Compilations

- The Essentials (2006), Warner Music

EPs

- Brighton Rock (1985), Flying Fist Records
- Hangin' High & Dry (1988), WEA

Singles

- "Breakin' Down The Barricade" (1984, as Heart Attack)
- "Can't Wait For The Night" (1986)
- "Change Of Heart" (1986)
- "We Came To Rock" / "Young, Wild And Free" (1987)
- "One More Try" / "Shootin' For Love" (1988)
- "Hangin' High & Dry" (1988)
- "Unleash The Rage" (1989)
- "Can't Stop the Earth from Shaking" (1989)
- "Hollywood Shuffle" (1991)
- "Creatures of the Night" (2013)
- "Shootin' For Love" (2014, re-release)
- "End of Time" (2019)

Compilation inclusions

- Q-107 Homegrown Volume Six (1984, as Heart Attack), RCA
- Be Naughty Be Hair Metal (2010), Rhino Entertainment
- A World With Heroes (A Kiss Tribute For Cancer Care) (2013), MSPVS.org

== Band members ==
Final lineup

- Greg "Fraze" Fraser – guitar (1982–1992, 2001–2020)
- Steve "Stevie" Skreebs – bass guitar (1982–1992, 2001–2020)
- Johnny "John" Rogers – keyboards, piano, guitar (1985–1991, 2001–2020)
- Mark Cavarzan – drums, percussion (1982–1992, 2001–2020)
- Gerry McGhee – vocals (1982–1992, 2001–2020; his death)

Former

- Martin Victor – keyboards (1982–1985)

Touring

- Greg Boileau – guitar, keyboards (1991–1992)
- Derek McGowan – guitar (2002)

Timeline
