= Lost Angel (album) =

Studio album by 3rd Strike
- Released: May 14, 2002
- Studio: Stall #2 (Redondo Beach, California); Ecstasy Studios (North Hollywood, California); 4th Street Recording (Santa Monica, California); Long View Farms (North Brookfield, Massachusetts)
- Genre: Nu metal; rap metal
- Length: 40:05
- Label: Hollywood
- Producer: Mudrock, Toby Wright

Singles from Lost Angel
- 1. "No Light" Released: 2002; 2. "Redemption" Released: 2002

Professional ratings
Review scores
Source	Rating
AllMusic	link

Lost Angel is the sole studio album by Californian nu metal group 3rd Strike. It was released on May 14, 2002, through Hollywood Records. The album features two singles, "No Light" and "Redemption". The radio single and video of the former garnered significant airplay upon release. Lost Angel also includes a cover of Black Sabbath's "Paranoid", with an additional rapped verse.

== Track listing ==
All songs were written by Jim Korthe, Todd Deguchi, Erik Carlsson, Gabe Hammersmith, and PJ McMullan, except "Paranoid" (written by John Michael Osbourne, Anthony Frank Iommi, Terence Michael Joseph Butler, and William Thomas Ward).

No.	Title	Length
1.	"Flow Heat"	3:08
2.	"Walked Away"	3:11
3.	"Redemption"	3:48
4.	"Blind My Eyes"	3:09
5.	"No Light"	4:10
6.	"Cities on Fire"	2:39
7.	"Breathe It Out"	3:31
8.	"All Lies"	3:12
9.	"Strung Out"	3:42
10.	"Lisa"	4:21
11.	"Paranoid"	2:54
12.	"Hang On"	4:16

=== Bonus tracks ===
No.	Title	Length
13.	"Sick Skin"	2:48
14.	"Champagne Dreams" (demo version)	3:10
15.	"Strung Out" (demo version)	4:28

== Personnel ==
- Jim Korthe – vocals
- Todd Deguchi – guitars
- Erik Carlsson – guitars
- Gabe Hammersmith – bass
- PJ McMullan – drums

== Charts ==
=== Singles ===
Year	Title	Chart positions	
Year	Title	US Modern Rock	US Mainstream Rock
2002	"No Light"	36	23
2002	"Redemption"	—	40
