= Lost Angeles (disambiguation) =

Lost Angeles may refer to:

- "Lost Angeles", a song by Colosseum that appeared on their albums The Grass Is Greener (1970) and Colosseum Live (1971)
- "Lost Angeles", a song by Giorgio Moroder from his album From Here to Eternity (1977)
- "Lost Angeles", a song by Wired All Wrong from their album Break out the Battle Tapes (2006)
- Lost Angeles, film directed by Phedon Papamichael (2012)
- Lost Angeles, EP by Lost Kings (2019)

== See also ==
- Los Angeles
