= The Nixons (album) =

1997 studio album by the Nixons

Studio album by The Nixons
- Released: June 24, 1997
- Recorded: 1997
- Studio: Longview Farms, North Brookfield, Massachusetts
- Genre: Alternative rock, post-grunge
- Length: 48:28
- Label: MCA

The Nixons chronology
Foma (1995)	The Nixons (1997)	Latest Thing (2000)

The Nixons is the third album by the American alternative rock band The Nixons. It was released on June 24, 1997 by MCA Records.

== Reception ==
Professional ratings
Review scores
Source	Rating
AllMusic	2/5 stars

Deren Svendsen of AllMusic gave the album two stars. He states "In 1996, the Nixons appeared to be on the verge of becoming one of the next big post-grunge bands, due in large part to the hit single "Sister," an acoustic ballad that wore the band's Pearl Jam influences on its sleeve. They returned in the summer of 1997 with this self-titled album, yet anyone expecting an album further mining the sound of "Sister" is bound to be disappointed. Rather than capitalizing on their success, the Nixons have instead crafted a set of hard, grungier songs." He praised the track "Sad, Sad Me", but concludes by writing "Unfortunately, other than that one winner, this is strictly paint-by-number mid-'90s rock, with little to recommend to anyone except the most die-hard fan." Writing in Lollipop Magazine, Barbara Restaino was more positive and wrote that "the appeal is the fact that their songs are simply songs, not experiments or musings or conglomerations or fortified with vitamins and minerals or whatever."

== Track listing ==
No.	Title	Length
1.	"Baton Rouge"	3:37
2.	"Miss U.S.A."	2:49
3.	"In Spite of Herself..."	3:16
4.	"The Fall"	4:39
5.	"Sad, Sad Me"	4:37
6.	"Screaming Yellow"	3:33
7.	"December"	3:50
8.	"...At the Sun"	3:52
9.	"Saving Grace"	3:46
10.	"Leave"	3:52
11.	"Butterfly"	3:24
12.	"Shine"	7:13
Total length:		48:28

== Personnel ==
- Ricky Wolking – bass, backing vocals
- Jesse Davis – guitar, backing vocals
- Zac Maloy – guitar, vocals
- John Humphrey – drums, backing vocals
- Gabriel McNair - piano
