= Memento (band) =

Australian hard rock band

- Also known as: Nine Times Bodyweight (2006–2007)
- Origin: Australia/United States
- Genres: Hard rock, alternative metal, nu metal
- Years active: 2001–2004; 2006–2007
- Label: Columbia
- Past members: Justin Stewart Cotta; Jason "Space" Smith; Leighton "Lats" Kearns; Steve Clark; Jeff Bowders

Memento was an Australian hard rock band based out of the United States. Formed in 2001, the band disbanded in 2004 after the release of their debut album. After a two-year absence, the band re-emerged in 2006 under the name Nine Times Bodyweight, which itself disbanded after a year and without any further releases.

== History ==
=== Formation ===
Formed in 2001, Memento was composed of Australian natives in vocalist-keyboardist Justin Stewart Cotta, guitarist Space (Jason Smith), bassist Leighton "Lats" Kearns, and American drummer Steve Clark.

The band released their debut album Beginnings on 25 February 2003. Two singles were released from the album, "Nothing Sacred" and "Saviour," and a music video for "Coming" was produced as well. Both "Nothing Sacred" and "Saviour" made a moderate impact on the US mainstream rock charts. Memento was also part of the 2003 Ozzfest tour as a rotating second stage act.

=== First break-up and re-emergence ===
Due to personal conflicts amongst the band members, as well as record label issues, the band was dissolved in late 2004. Cotta and Kearns re-emerged as Man vs Clock in 2005. In early 2006, Memento reformed with a new drummer, Jeff Bowders, under the new name Nine Times Bodyweight, or "9xB." The band went to work recording new material. However, the project didn't last, and disbanded in early 2007. No official statement was publicly released as to why the group dissolved.

=== Second break-up and solo ventures ===
Following the band's second break-up, Kearns toured the United States with Sunflower Dead.

Cotta went on to pursue a solo career under the names "Justin Cotta and The Tenderhooks" and "Justin Stewart Cotta". Cotta is currently signed to EMI as a solo artist. His work is currently not for sale nor available for download. Cotta splits his time between music, theatre and film. As an actor, he was featured as Eugene in the American film Boys and Girls' Guide to Getting Down, for which he and the cast won best ensemble cast at the Los Angeles Indie Film Awards. Cotta had a lead role in the world premiere of David Williamson's play Let the Sunshine, in which a live version of his original song "Innocent Girl" was featured. Some of Cotta's finest musical work comes in the form of an original soundtrack for the award-winning short film One. The film is a finalist for Tropfest 2010, the world's largest short film festival.

Guitarist Jason "Space" Smith has begun his own solo project under the name mononym Space. Joining him are former Nine Times Bodyweight drummer Jeff Bowders on drums and Jack Morrice of Driveblind. Signed with Captiva Records, Space's debut album, When Clouds Align, was set for release through in early 2008, with his second release, Exit Strategies, released later the same year. Space played all instruments on When Clouds Align save for drums, which were split between T-Bone and Steve Clark, and was responsible for the production and mixing of the album.

Outside of his solo project, Space has written with Kevin Martin previously on The Hiwatts' 2003 release The Possibility of Being and has teamed up again with Martin to write the song "Stand" for the forthcoming Candlebox album. Space has also worked with Seether, who released their fourth studio release on 23 October 2007, entitled Finding Beauty in Negative Spaces. On the album, Space co-wrote and played guitars and E-bow on "Waste."

Since 2008, Memento guitarist Jason "Space" Smith teamed up with Canadian songstress Andrea Wasse to form the contemporary duo Digital Daggers.

In 2018 Jason "Space" Smith and Justin Cotta released a single, "Legacy".

== Members ==
=== Memento line-up ===
- Justin Stewart Cotta – vocals, piano, guitar
- Space (Jason Smith) – guitar
- Leighton "Lats" Kearns – bass
- Steve Clark – drums

=== Nine Times Bodyweight line-up ===
- Justin Stewart Cotta – lead vocals, keyboard
- Space (Jason Smith) – guitar
- Leighton "Lats" Kearns – bass
- Jeff Bowders – drums

== Discography ==
=== Studio albums ===
Album information
Beginnings
- Released: 25 February 2003 (US)
- Label: Columbia Records
- Chart Positions: –
- Album Sales: 50,000+
- Singles: Nothing Sacred, Saviour

=== Singles ===
Year	Song	US Main	Album
2003	"Nothing Sacred"	28	Beginnings
2003	"Saviour"	35	Beginnings
