= Breaking the Silence (EP) =

EP by The Letter Black
- Released: September 22, 2009
- Genre: Christian rock, hard rock
- Label: Tooth & Nail

The Letter Black chronology
Stand (2007)	Breaking the Silence (2009)	Hanging On by a Thread (2010)

Singles from Breaking the Silence
- 1. "Hanging On By a Thread" Released: 2009

Professional ratings
Review scores
Source	Rating
Jesus Freak Hideout	3/5 stars

Breaking the Silence is the first EP by the Christian hard rock band The Letter Black. It was released on September 22, 2009, on Tooth & Nail Records.

== Track listing ==
No.	Title	Length
1.	"Moving On"	3:38
2.	"Hanging On by a Thread"	3:02
3.	"Best of Me"	3:48
4.	"Collapse"	3:59
5.	"Away from Me"	3:37
6.	"Perfect"	4:03

== Credits ==
- Sarah Anthony - vocals
- Mark Anthony - guitar, vocals
- Matt Beal - bass

Additional musicians

- Brian Vodinh - drums
- Kirke Jan - percussion
