= Gerry McGhee =

Scottish-Canadian singer (1962–2020)

- Born: Gerald McGhee; 15 August 1962
- Origin: Glasgow, Scotland
- Died: 25 August 2020 (aged 58)
- Occupations: Singer, songwriter
- Instrument: Vocals
- Years active: 1982–2020
- Label: WEA

Gerald McGhee (15 August 1962 – 25 August 2020) was a Scottish-Canadian singer who was best known as the lead vocalist for the Canadian hard rock band Brighton Rock.

Brighton Rock has so far released three albums and an EP throughout their career, their most successful album being Take a Deep Breath, released in 1988. It charted at number 22 in Canada and was certified Gold by the CRIA. The album also spawned the hit single "One More Try". Brighton Rock broke up in 1991, and reunited in 2002.

McGhee died of cancer on 25 August 2020.

== Discography ==
=== With Brighton Rock ===
Studio albums

- Young, Wild and Free (1986)
- Take a Deep Breath (1988)
- Love Machine (1991)

EP

- Brighton Rock (1985)

Live album

- A Room For Five Live (2002)

== See also ==
- Brighton Rock
