= The Letter Black =

American Christian rock band

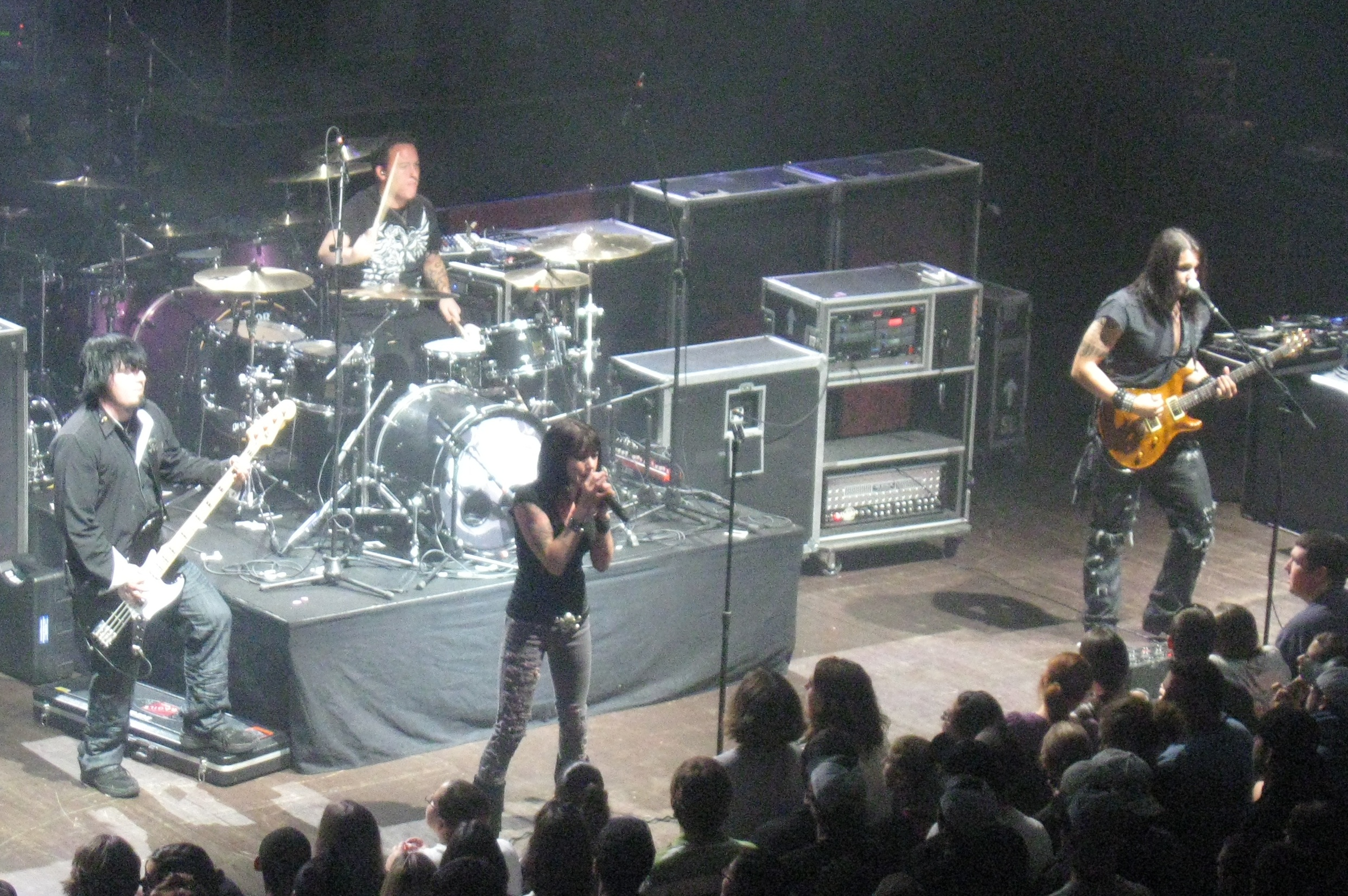

Background information
- Also known as: Kry Up, Breaking the Silence
- Origin: Uniontown, Pennsylvania, U.S.
- Genres: Christian rock; hard rock; alternative metal; post-grunge; nu metal
- Years active: 2006–present
- Labels: Tooth & Nail, EMP, Rockfest
- Members: Sarah Anthony; Mark Anthony; Matt Beal; Will Fowler; Brandon Jordan
- Past members: Justin Brown; Adam DeFrank
- Website: www.theletterblack.com

The Letter Black, formerly known as Breaking the Silence, is an American Christian rock band that was formed in 2006 in Uniontown, Pennsylvania. The band consists of lead vocalist Sarah Anthony; her husband, lead guitarist and vocalist Mark Anthony; bassist Matt Beal and drummer William Fowler and rhythm guitarist Brandon Jordan.

== History ==
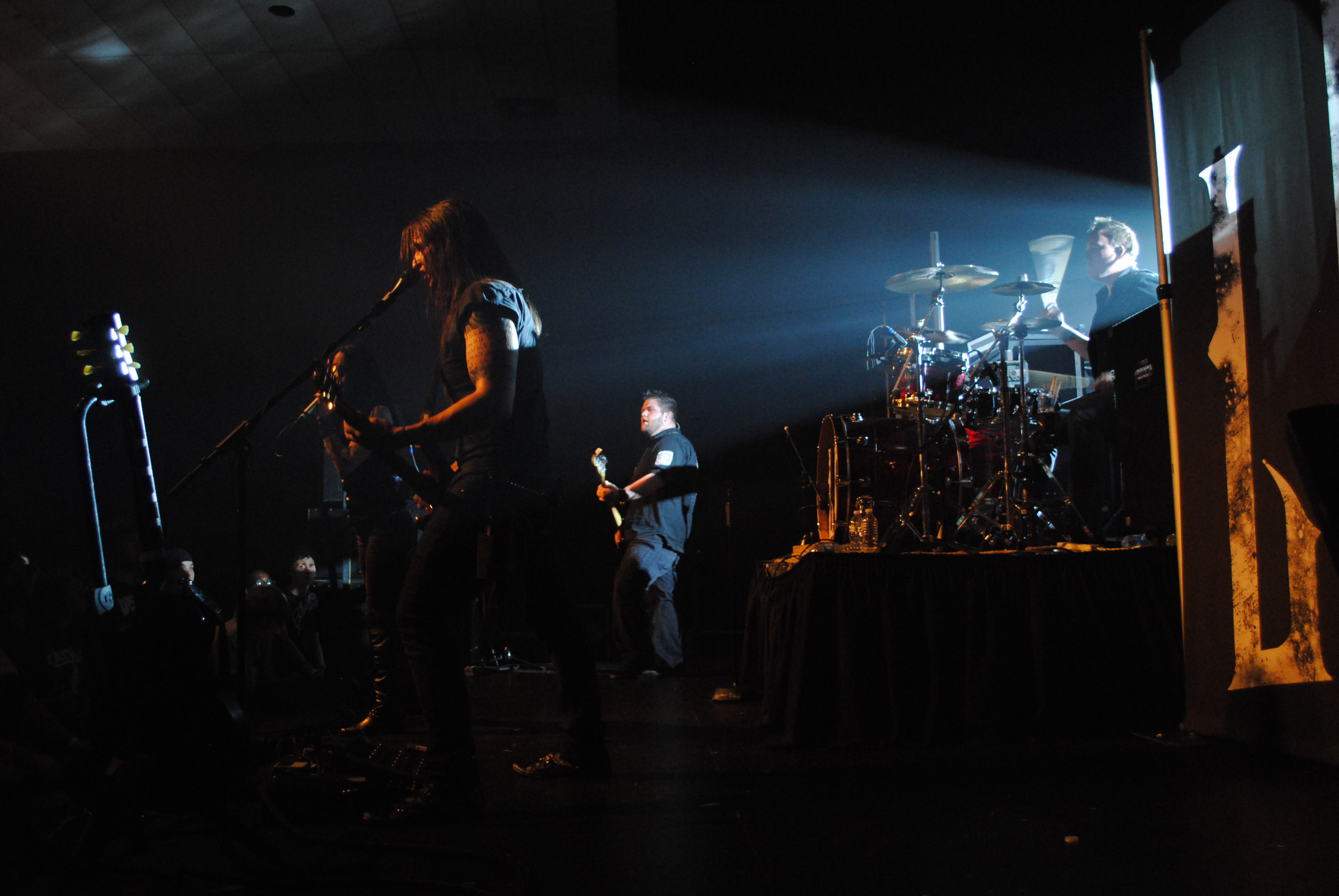
The Letter Black in 2011.

The Letter Black started out as a praise team at their local church with Sarah and her husband Mark as a duo on vocals under the name "Breaking the Silence". Later when they were signed to Tooth & Nail Records they changed the name of the band to "The Letter Black". In 2008, Sarah Anthony was featured on the Pillar album For the Love of the Game, singing on the track "I Fade Away". The band often does 150 shows or more a year and has shared the stage with bands such as Skillet, Decyfer Down, Red, and Hawk Nelson. They performed as the opening act for Skillet in the "2010 Awake and Alive Tour" and for the Thousand Foot Krutch "Welcome to the Masquerade Tour".

The band's debut album, Hanging On By a Thread was released on May 4, 2010 through Tooth & Nail records, putting The Letter Black as number 8 in the iTunes rock section in the same day.

A remix album titled Hanging On by a Remix was released on May 22, 2012.

In early 2013, the band was reported to be recording new material for their second studio album, later revealed to be called Rebuild. The first single for the new album, "Sick Charade", was released on October 3, 2012. "The Only One" was released in February 2013 and "Pain Killer" was released on September 10, 2013. The album was initially scheduled to be released on April 23, 2013, however, on April 17, the album was postponed because the band decided to write three new songs for the album. The album was released on November 12, 2013.

On November 19, 2016, the band previewed a new song on their Facebook page for their upcoming fourth studio album which would be released by early 2017. According to the band, this would be their heaviest album to date. They announced that they had left Tooth & Nail Records and would record their next album independently. The band ran a successful $25,000 Kickstarter campaign to record their next album. The band later signed with EMP Music Group on March 13, 2017. They also announced the album title revealed to be Pain and the cover art was also revealed. The album was released on May 26, 2017. The first single, "Last Day That I Cared", premiered on Revolver on April 30, 2017. A lyric video for "Rock's Not Dead" was released on May 19, 2017.

In April 2020, Mark and Sarah Anthony announced that they signed with Rockfest Records. On December 13, drummer Justin Brown left the band to be replaced by Will Fowler.

On January 1, 2026, the band announced they will be releasing two new albums titled "Paper" and "Ink".

=== Other media ===
In February 2013, Mark and Sarah Anthony signed with VIP Ink Publishing for an autobiography.

== Band members ==
Current members

- Sarah Anthony – lead vocals (2006–present)
- Mark Anthony – lead guitar, vocals (2006–present)
- Matt Beal – bass guitar (2006–2016, 2020–present)
- Will Fowler – drums (2020–present)
- Brandon Jordan – rhythm guitar (2021–present)

Former members

- Justin Brown – drums (2012–2017)
- Adam DeFrank – drums (2006–2008)

Touring musicians

- Keith Anselmo – drums (2008–2009)
- Mike Motter – drums (2017)
- Daniel Hegerle – drums (2017–2018)
- Taylor Carroll – drums(2011)
- Mat Slagle – drums (2009–2011)
- Terry Johnson – rhythm guitar (2009)

== Discography ==
=== Studio albums ===
Year	Title	Label(s)	Chart positions		Sales
Year	Title	Label(s)	US Billboard 200	US Christ	Sales
2007	Stand	Independent			
2010	Hanging On By a Thread	Tooth & Nail Records	183	10	
2013	Rebuild	Tooth & Nail Records		32	
2017	Pain	EMP Label Group	86	6	
2021	The Letter Black	Rockfest Records			
2026	Paper				
2026	Ink				

=== EPs ===
- Breaking the Silence EP (2009)
- Hanging on by a Thread Sessions Vol. 1 (2011)
- Hanging on by a Thread Sessions Vol. 2 (2011)

=== Other releases ===
- Hanging On By a Remix (2012) Tooth & Nail Records

=== Singles ===
Year	Title	Active Rock	Album
2009	"Best of Me"	—	Breaking the Silence EP
2010	"Hanging On By a Thread"	46	Hanging On By a Thread
2010	"Believe"	—	Hanging On By a Thread
2011	"Fire with Fire"	—	Hanging On By a Thread
2012	"The Only One"	—	Rebuild
2012	"Sick Charade"	45	Rebuild
2013	"Pain Killer"	—	Rebuild
2014	"Up from The Ashes"	—	Rebuild
2017	"Last Day That I Cared"	—	Pain
2021	"Rise"	—	The Letter Black
2021	"Born for This" featuring Trevor McNevan)	—	The Letter Black
2022	"Throwing Darts"	—	The Letter Black
2022	"The Kiss of Death"	—	The Letter Black
