= The Nixons =

American rock band

- Origin: Oklahoma City, Oklahoma, U.S.
- Genres: Alternative rock, post-grunge
- Years active: 1990–2000; 2017–present
- Labels: Dragon Street; Rainmaker; MCA; KOCH
- Members: Zac Maloy; Jesse Davis; Ricky Brooks; John Humphrey
- Past members: Tye Robison; Ricky Wolking; Ray Luzier; Scott "Scooby" Bush
- Website: thenixonsofficial.com

The Nixons are an American alternative rock band formed in 1990. They found commercial success during the mid-1990s, releasing two albums through MCA Records in 1995–1997. The band is best known for the hit singles "Sister" and "Wire" from their album Foma.

== History ==
=== Early years and success: 1990–1996 ===
The Nixons were founded in Oklahoma City by singer and guitarist Zac Maloy, guitarist Jesse Davis, bassist Ricky Brooks, and drummer Tye Robison. According to Maloy, the band's name has no political meaning: "'The Nixons' was short, sweet and I always tell people it had an 'x' in the middle so it looked cool on t-shirts and stickers. That's about it." The group independently released a self-titled cassette in 1990 and followed it with the EP Six in 1992, on Dragon Street Records. John Humphrey replaced Robison on drums, and the Nixons issued Halo in 1994 on Dallas-based Rainmaker Records. This album featured several songs also included on Foma, their official debut LP, released in May 1995 on MCA Records. Foma included the radio hits "Sister", "Wire", "Happy Song", and "Passion". The group capitalized on their success with big tours, including dates with Kiss, Sevendust, Slash's Snakepit, Brother Cane, Soul Asylum, Radiohead, and Toadies. Foma eventually peaked at No. 77 on the Billboard 200.

=== Subsequent albums and disbanding: 1997–2000 ===
The band replaced Ricky Brooks with Ricky Wolking and released The Nixons in June 1997 on MCA/Universal. The record featured three singles: "The Fall", "Miss USA", and "Baton Rouge". It eventually peaked at No. 188 on the Billboard 200.

They departed MCA Records following the release of the self-titled album. Consistent gigging ensured a strong cult audience for 1998's Scrapbook EP (featuring b-sides, live and acoustic performances, including covers of Elton John's "Rocket Man" and Cheap Trick's "Heaven Tonight"), which saw the band return to Rainmaker. Their third full-length album, Latest Thing, was released by Koch in early 2000. It featured songs co-written by Marti Frederiksen and Jack Blades of Night Ranger fame. Davis and Humphrey left the band after the album release. The band continued touring, replacing them with Scott Bush and Ray Luzier (of Korn and Army of Anyone fame), respectively. However, when the tour supporting the album concluded, they quietly disbanded.

=== Huver and solo projects: 2001–2016 ===
Davis, Brooks, and Humphrey reformed in early 2001 as Huver, with a new lead singer, Garin Murdock. The band gigged heavily and reportedly signed a recording contract with Epic Records, but broke up in mid-2002 after independently releasing one EP. John Humphrey went on to play drums in the band Seether. Zac Maloy released several albums as a solo artist, and later relocated to Nashville to work as a songwriter and producer with artists including Carrie Underwood, Skillet, Our Lady Peace, Halestorm, Hanson, Chris Daughtry, David Cook, and Bowling for Soup.

Jesse Davis formed roots rock band 4 Points West in 2002, which released an EP titled Lonesome Demise..., and a full-length album, Insomnia Suite. Davis played in Anchor the Girl and released music produced by Grammy-nominated musician Wes Sharon. Ricky Wolking went on to play bass for the rock band Edgewater and later recorded a solo album as Honky Mofo. Original drummer Robison is a co-owner of January Sound Studio in Dallas, and has worked as a producer/engineer with Drowning Pool, Cas Haley, and Dennis DeYoung.

=== Reforming and new music: 2017–present ===
In January 2017, the band announced two reunion shows with the classic Foma lineup (Maloy, Davis, Brooks, and Humphrey), playing in their native Oklahoma and also as part of the KDGE "The Edge" Edgefest 25th Anniversary lineup in Frisco, Texas. At the same time, the band launched official Facebook, Instagram, and Twitter social media pages.

In June 2017, a newly recorded song titled "Song of the Year" was released on iTunes, Google Play, and Spotify. The band released the brand new Song of the Year EP along with the re-release of their debut album, Halo, on vinyl for the first time, newly remastered by original producer Kerry Crafton. Both albums were supported by touring in late 2017.

In October 2018, they performed in Oklahoma City, Dallas, and Houston, TX as part of the lineup of Buzzfest festival. Jaxon Humphrey, son of drummer John, performed with the band during these shows, as his father had prior commitments with Seether. In 2019, the band entered the studio and re-recorded three of their fan favorites: "Wire", "Baton Rouge", and "Sister", each with the year 2020 added to the title to distinguish them from the original recordings. In addition to the three newly re-recorded songs, the band also recorded new music. "Crutch" was released digitally on July 2, 2019, and "Favorite Lies" was released on November 15, 2019. Both new songs received positive reviews throughout US radio markets and were noted as "a reminder that rock music was still alive".

After touring in late 2018 and throughout 2019, including with rock band Sponge, the Nixons released the three previously re-recorded songs on April 22, 2020, and also officially announced the forthcoming issue of a new EP, titled Sonic Boom. This was released digitally on May 22, 2020, and contained all new music recorded since the band's reunion.

== Band members ==
Current

- Zac Maloy – lead vocals, rhythm guitar, trumpet (1990–2000, 2017–present)
- Jesse Davis – lead guitar, backing vocals (1990–2000, 2017–present)
- Ricky Brooks – bass guitar, backing vocals, acoustic guitar (1990–1997, 2017–present)
- John Humphrey – drums, percussion (1993–2000, 2017–present)

Former

- Tye Robison – drums, backing vocals, programming (1990–1992)
- Ricky Wolking – bass guitar, backing vocals (1997–2000)
- Ray Luzier – drums (2000)
- Scott "Scooby" Bush – lead guitar, backing vocals (2000)

Touring musicians

- Jaxon Humphrey – drums, percussion (2017)
- Jaret Reddick – backing vocals (2017)

== Discography ==
=== Independent albums ===
Year	Title	Label
1990	The Nixons (Green Album)	Independent, on cassette only
2017	Halo (Remastered)	Independent, on vinyl only

=== Studio albums ===
Year	Title	Label	Chart positions
Year	Title	Label	Billboard 200
1994	Halo	Rainmaker Records	—
1995	Foma	MCA Records	77
1997	The Nixons	MCA Records	188
2000	Latest Thing	KOCH Records	—

=== EPs ===
Year	Title	Label	Chart positions
1992	Six	Dragon Street Records	—
1998	Scrapbook	Rainmaker Records	—
2017	Song of the Year	—	—
2020	Sonic Boom	—	—
2022	Kaleidoscope	—	—
2025	Four Zero Five	—	—

=== Singles ===
Year	Title	Chart positions					Album
Year	Title	US Hot 100	US Mainstream Rock	US Modern Rock	US Mainstream Top 40	AUS	Album
1996	"Sister"	48	6	11	39	53	Foma
1996	"Wire"	—	27	—	—	—	Foma
1997	"Baton Rouge"	—	9	—	—	—	The Nixons
1997	"The Fall"	—	22	—	—	—	The Nixons
2000	"First Trip"	—	32	—	—	—	Latest Thing
2017	"Song of the Year"	—	—	—	—	—	Song of the Year
2019	"Crutch"	—	—	—	—	—	Sonic Boom
2019	"Favorite Lies"	—	—	—	—	—	Sonic Boom
2020	"Ghost of an Angel"	—	—	—	—	—	Sonic Boom
2022	"Kaleidoscope"	—	—	—	—	—	Kaleidoscope

=== Music videos ===
Year	Title	Album
1995	"Head"	Foma
1995	"Wire"	Foma
1995	"Sister"	Foma
1996	"Happy Song"	Foma
1997	"Baton Rouge"	The Nixons
2000	"Blackout"	Latest Thing
2017	"Song of the Year"	Song of the Year EP
2019	"Crutch"	Sonic Boom EP
2019	"Favorite Lies"	Sonic Boom EP
2020	"Ghost of an Angel"	Sonic Boom EP
2022	"Kaleidoscope"	Kaleidoscope EP
