= Jesse Vest =

American songwriter

- Born: May 10, 1977 (age 49); Jeffersonville, Indiana, U.S.
- Origin: Charlestown, Indiana; Louisville, Kentucky, U.S.
- Genres: Alternative metal, post-grunge, hard rock
- Occupations: Rock musician, bass guitarist, songwriter
- Instruments: Bass guitar
- Years active: 1988 – present
- Labels: Outpost, Maverick Records
- Website: www.thelouisvillecrashers.com

Jesse Vest (born May 10, 1977) is an American rock musician and bassist for the band The Louisville Crashers. Vest was the founding bassist of Days of the New and Tantric.

== Biography ==
Jesse Vest began his career in music at an early age. The son of a guitar player and avid bluegrass fan, his first instrument was a banjo. At age 10, however, he discovered rock and roll. The banjo found its way to the closet and a bass player was born. Over the next several years he played and collaborated with various musicians, and found a creative bond with two of his classmates. This group would later become "Days of the New", and the day after his high school graduation, Vest was on tour supporting the band's debut album. The project turned out to be quite successful. Appearances on MTV, the Late Show with David Letterman, and opening shows for bands like Metallica and Aerosmith helped the band to become a platinum-selling artist in both the U.S. and Canada. Citing creative differences the band split up in 1998. Vest moved on to co-found another band. Tantric, whose first album was released in 2001, enjoyed much of the same success. They performed on The Tonight Show with Jay Leno, Late Night with Conan O'Brien, and shared the stage with bands like 3 Doors Down and Creed.

== Role in Days of the New ==
Jesse Vest began as the bassist in an experimental rock/metal trio called Dead Reckoning, with Travis Meeks and Mat Taul. When they turned to an acoustic sound, they changed the name of the band to Days of the New and added guitarist Todd Whitener. In February 1999 the original lineup of Days of the New split up. After touring in promotion of their first album, Vest, Taul & Whitener departed the band, citing clashes with Meeks over the direction of the band. Todd Whitener, Mat Taul, and Vest would go on to form C14, soon renamed Tantric.

== Role in Tantric ==
In 1999 Jesse Vest co-founded the band Tantric with Hugo Ferreira and fellow former members of Days of the New: Todd Whitener, and Mat Taul. The band released their first album in 2001, with Vest playing bass. This debut proved a success, but after their second album, Vest left the group wishing to spend more time with his family. Currently living in Charlestown, Indiana.

== Role in Louisville Crashers ==
Louisville Crashers was formed in 2004. Vest took part in one of the gigs the band was playing at the time and liked the style the band brought. As of 2014, they've released their debut self-titled album through digital outlets.

== Blisskrieg ==
As of November 2020, Jesse Vest had finished recording the debut album of the new band Blisskrieg, along with former Eye Empire and Submersed vocalist Donald Carpenter, guitarist Todd Whitener, and drummer Mat Taul, both former bandmates of Jesse's from the bands Days of the New and Tantric.

February 22, 2021 they released their debut album Remedy on digital streaming services.
