= Todd Whitener =

American musician

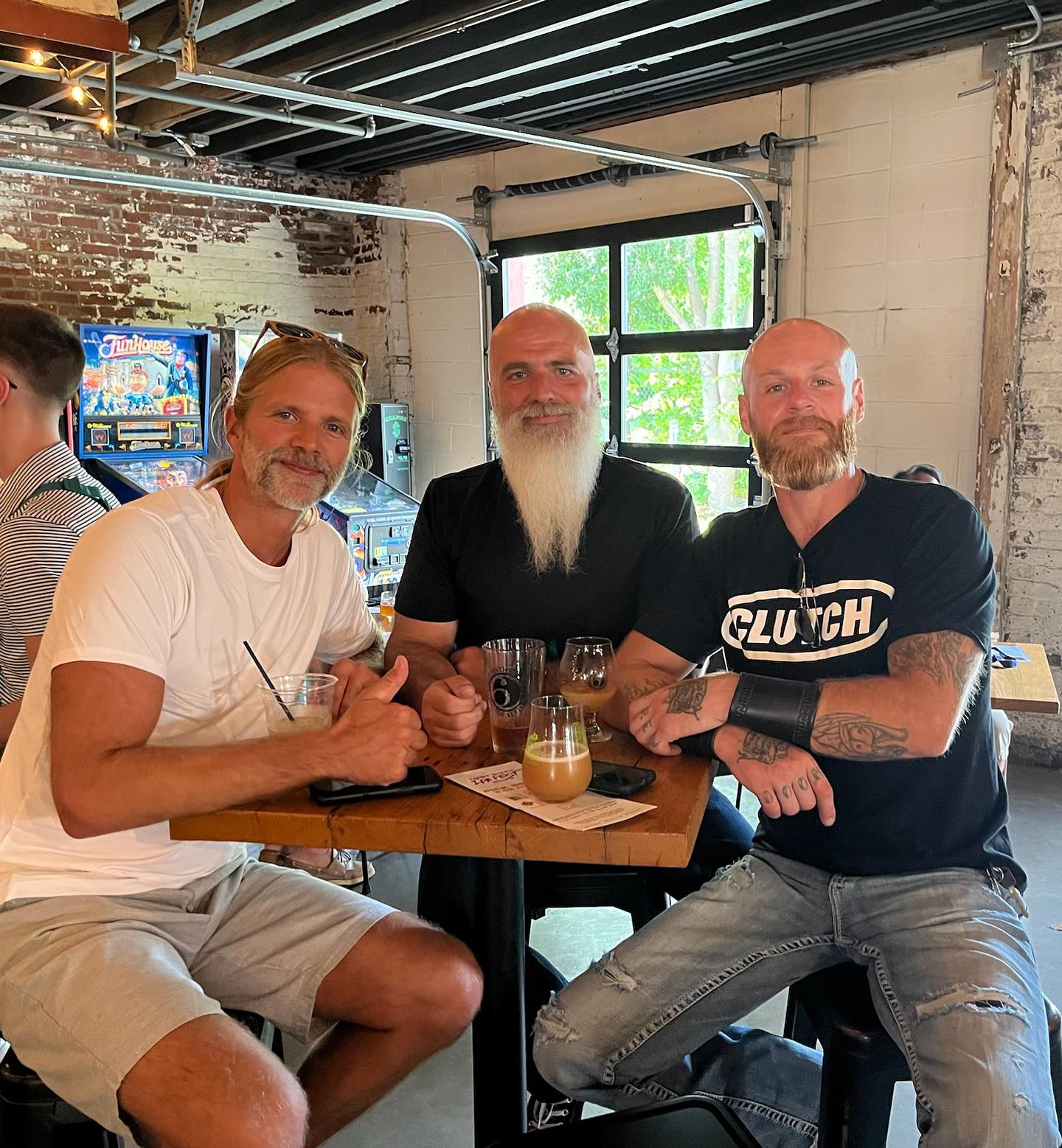
- (From left to right): Todd Whitener, Jesse Vest, Matt Taul in August 2023.

Background information
- Born: May 25, 1978 (age 48)
- Origin: Louisville, Kentucky, U.S.
- Genres: Rock, acoustic rock, post-grunge
- Occupations: Singer, musician
- Instruments: Vocals, guitar
- Website: whitenermusic.com

Todd Whitener is an American musician best known from his time with the bands Days of the New and Tantric. He is currently on his own solo project, entitled Whitener. He has released three albums and one extended play since 2012.

== Early life ==
Whitener began playing guitar in 1992, when he bought a 'Dixon' guitar for 70 dollars. From the year 1992 until 1995, he played in various local bands. In 1995, he joined a band formed by members Jesse Vest, Travis Meeks and Mat Taul. The band's name at the time was called Dead Reckoning. Upon Whitener joining the band, the band name was changed to Days of the New.

== Days of the New ==
By the year 1996, the band had signed a recording contract and released their self-titled album the following year. The album went platinum and they got to open for Metallica. Despite the quick rise to fame, Whitener along with the other original members of the band were fired by Meeks.

In 2014 Whitener, and the other original Days of the New band members Jesse, Matt and Travis reunited for their 'Full Circle' Tour. The band was to release an EP later in the Fall of 2014, but once again the original lineup malfunctioned, causing Jesse, Matt and Todd to leave the group.

== Tantric ==
After the dismissal from Days of the New, Whitener and the other two members would form the band C-14 along with their new lead singer, Hugo Ferreira. The band quickly changed their name to Tantric. Their self-titled debut went gold and the band made a few appearances on a few late-night shows. In 2004, the band released their second album, After We Go.

The album did not have the same success as their debut album. The band quickly began disintegrating, first having bassist Jesse Vest leave the band in 2005. Later, drummer Mat Taul was arrested on drug charges in 2007, and Whitener gave his own farewell announcement on the band's website shortly after, citing feelings of stagnation that caused him to grow tired of the band's struggle to succeed.

== Solo career ==
In 2008, he gave classes at Mom's Music in his hometown of Louisville, Kentucky. Whitener also played guitar in local shows. He joined bassist Bruce LaFrance who was Jesse Vest's replacement in Tantric to form a band called Interchange for which they released a few songs which were never released for purchase.

In 2013, Whitener released his first solo record, an E.P called Seeds of Positivity under his last name, Whitener. In 2014, Whitener released his first full album, entitled Connectivity. Both albums were released digitally.

Whitener released his second solo studio album titled "Sunsets and Fairytales" on May 12, 2015.

On November 14, 2015, Whitener released a 4-track EP titled "There to Here" including the singles "Fade (EP Remix)" and "What Have I Done To You".

On December 12, 2015, Whitener released a new single titled "Love Is True".

On April 6, 2018, Whitener released his third solo album, titled "Firefly". The following year he released an EP called Interdimensional.

On January 28, 2020, he released his fourth album, titled Perspective.

== Blisskrieg ==
In 2020, Whitener joined his former Days of the New and Tantric bandmates Jesse Vest and Matt Taul and former Eye Empire and Submersed vocalist Donald Carpenter in forming a new band, Blisskreig. They released their album Remedy in February 2021 and a three-song EP titled Day 3 in 2024.
