= Tantric discography =

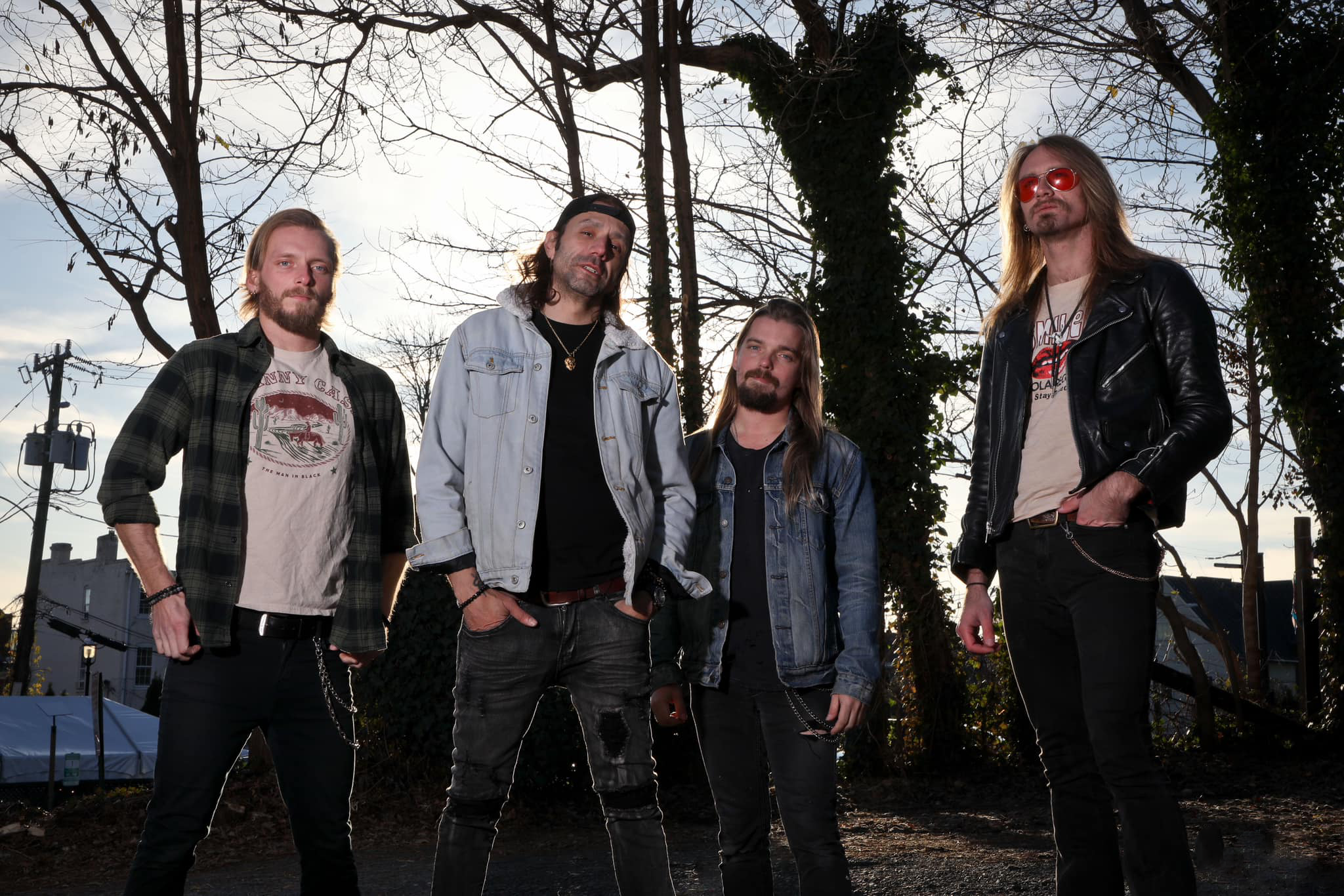
- Tantric in 2025
- Studio albums: 8
- EPs: 1
- Compilation albums: 1
- Singles: 20
- Music videos: 8
- Promotional singles: 8

This is a comprehensive discography of official recordings by Tantric, an American rock band from Louisville, Kentucky. Tantric has released eight studio albums, one compilation album, 20 singles and eight promotional singles.

== Studio albums ==
List of studio albums, with selected chart positions and certifications
Title	Album details	Peak chart positions				Certifications
Title	Album details	US	US Ind.	US Rock	US Hard Rock	Certifications
Tantric	Released: February 13, 2001 (US); Label: Maverick; Formats: CD, digital download	71	—	—	—	RIAA: Gold
After We Go	Released: February 24, 2004 (US); Label: Maverick; Formats: CD, LP, digital download	56	—	—	—	
The End Begins	Released: April 22, 2008 (US); Label: Silent Majority; Formats: CD, digital download	91	15	—	—	
Mind Control	Released: August 4, 2009 (US); Label: Silent Majority; Formats: CD, digital download	101	15	38	—	
37 Channels	Released: September 17, 2013 (US); Label: Pavement; Formats: CD, digital download	—	—	—	24	
Blue Room Archives	Released: September 30, 2014 (US); Label: Pavement; Format: CD, digital download	—	—	—	68	
Mercury Retrograde	Released: October 5, 2018 (US); Label: Pavement; Format: CD, digital download	—	—	—	—	
The Sum of All Things	Released: July 23, 2021 (US); Label: Cleopatra; Format: CD, digital download	—	—	—	—	
"—" denotes a recording that did not chart or was not released in that territory.

== Singles ==
=== 2000's ===
List of singles, with selected chart positions, showing year released and album name
Title	Year	Peak chart positions				Album
Title	Year	US Bub.	US Alt.	US Heri. Rock	US Main. Rock	Album
"Breakdown"	2000	6	4	—	1	Tantric
"Astounded"	2001	—	30	—	7	Tantric
"Mourning"	2001	—	22	—	18	Tantric
"Hey Now"	2004	—	—	—	8	After We Go
"The Chain"	2004	—	—	—	36	After We Go
"After We Go"	2004	—	—	—	30	After We Go
"Down and Out"	2008	—	34	—	8	The End Begins
"The One"	2008	—	—	—	—	The End Begins
"Fall Down"	2008	—	—	—	34	The End Begins
"Mind Control"	2009	—	—	30	22	Mind Control
"Coming Undone"	2009	—	—	—	31	Mind Control
"—" denotes a recording that did not chart or was not released in that territory.

=== 2010–2020's ===
List of singles, with selected chart positions, showing year released and album name
Title	Year	Album
"Carol of the Bells"	2010	Carol of the Bells
"Mosquita"	2013	37 Channels
"You Got What You Wanted"	2014	37 Channels
"Cynical"	2014	Blue Room Archives
"Mourning After"	2015	Blue Room Archives
"Letting Go"	2018	Mercury Retrograde
"Against My Forever"	2018	Mercury Retrograde
"Angry"	2019	Mercury Retrograde
"Living Here Without You"	2021	The Sum of All Things
"Moonlight Feels Right"	2025	Single

== Music videos ==
List of music videos, showing year released
Title	Year
"Breakdown"	2000
"Astounded"	2001
"Mourning"	2001
"Hey Now"	2004
"Down and Out"	2008
"Mind Control"	2009
"Mosquita"	2013
"Letting Go"	2018
"Angry"	2019
"Living Here Without You"	2021
"Walk That Way"	2021
