= Broken Down...Live in the Poconos =

Broken Down...Live and Acoustic in the Poconos

EP by Tantric
- Released: July 22, 2008
- Genre: Acoustic rock
- Length: 16:40
- Label: Silent Majority Group

Tantric chronology
The End Begins (2008)	Broken Down...Live and Acoustic in the Poconos (2008)	Mind Control (2009)

Broken Down...Live and Acoustic in the Poconos is an EP released by American band Tantric on July 22, 2008, on the Silent Majority Group label. The EP contains four tracks.

== Track listing ==
All lyrics by Hugo Ferreira, music composed by all members.

No.	Title	Length
1.	"Down and Out"	3:40
2.	"Lucky One"	4:30
3.	"Wishing"	4:30
4.	"Let It Be" (The Beatles cover)	4:00

== Personnel ==
- Hugo Ferreira – vocals
- Kevin Miller – drums
- Joe Pessia – guitar
- Erik Leonhardt – bass
- Marcus Ratzenboeck – electric violin
