= Scott Wilson (musician) =

American musician

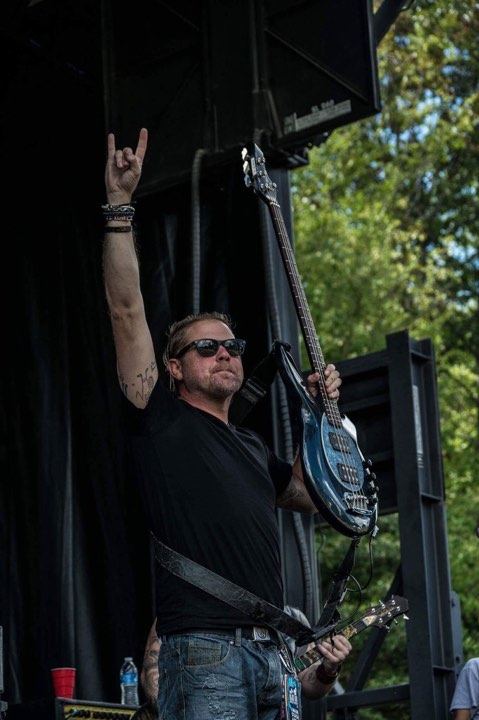
- Wilson performing in 2017

Background information
- Born: November 25, 1972 (age 53)
- Origin: Berea, Kentucky, U.S.
- Genres: Hard rock; heavy metal; post-grunge
- Instrument: Bass guitar
- Years active: 1990–present
- Member of: Saving Abel
- Formerly of: Tantric
- Website: scottwilsonmusic.com

Scott Wilson (born November 25, 1972) is an American musician, songwriter, and music producer from Berea, Kentucky. He is most known for his time as the bass guitarist for the rock band Tantric, having appeared on their 2014 album Blue Room Archives and Mercury Retrograde in 2018. He also served as the bass guitarist for Saving Abel from 2017 to 2026.

== Career ==
=== Tantric (2013–2017) ===
Wilson served as the bass guitarist for Tantric beginning in 2013, appearing with them on multiple national tours, the band's 2014 album Blue Room Archives, and on Mercury Retrograde in 2018. He was recruited shortly after the production of the band's previous album 37 Channels, and appeared with the band on multiple tours, including the 2016 edition of the Make America Rock Again tour, sharing the stage with Trapt, Saving Abel, Saliva, and more. In an interview with Stone Age Rock Report, Wilson described the tour as "a big success for the band and quite eventful". In July 2017, Wilson announced publicly that he would be leaving the band, and had already begun working on new material with Saving Abel.

=== Saving Abel (2017–2026) ===
Saving Abel, who rose to fame in 2008 with 'Addicted,' a song about being addicted to receiving oral sex, announced via their Facebook page that Wilson would be replacing Eric Taylor on bass guitar on June 14, 2017. The band is currently working on writing a new record. Wilson announced his departure from Saving Abel in October of 2026.
