= Mind control =

Mind control may refer to:

== Psychology and neurology ==
- Brainwashing, the concept that the human mind can be altered or controlled by certain psychological techniques
- Brain–computer interface
- Remote control of human beings
- Remote control animal
- Hypnosis
- Mind control in popular culture
- Neuroprosthetics, the technology of controlling robotics with neural impulses
- Psychological manipulation

== Film and television ==
- Mind Control (film), a 1987 Italian film
- Mind Control (TV series), a 2000–2003 British series featuring mentalist Derren Brown
- Mind Control with Derren Brown, a 2007 American TV series

== Music ==
- Mind Control (Canibus album) or the title song, 2005
- Mind Control (Stephen Marley album) or the title song, 2007
- Mind Control (Tantric album), 2009
  - "Mind Control" (song), the title song
- Mind Control (Uncle Acid & the Deadbeats album), 2013
- Mind Control, the debut album by Mono Mind, 2019
- "Mind Control", the last song on Slayer's sixth album, Divine Intervention
- Mind Control, the original name of the Japanese band Date of birth, or a 1990 album by the same band
