= Mutual Live =

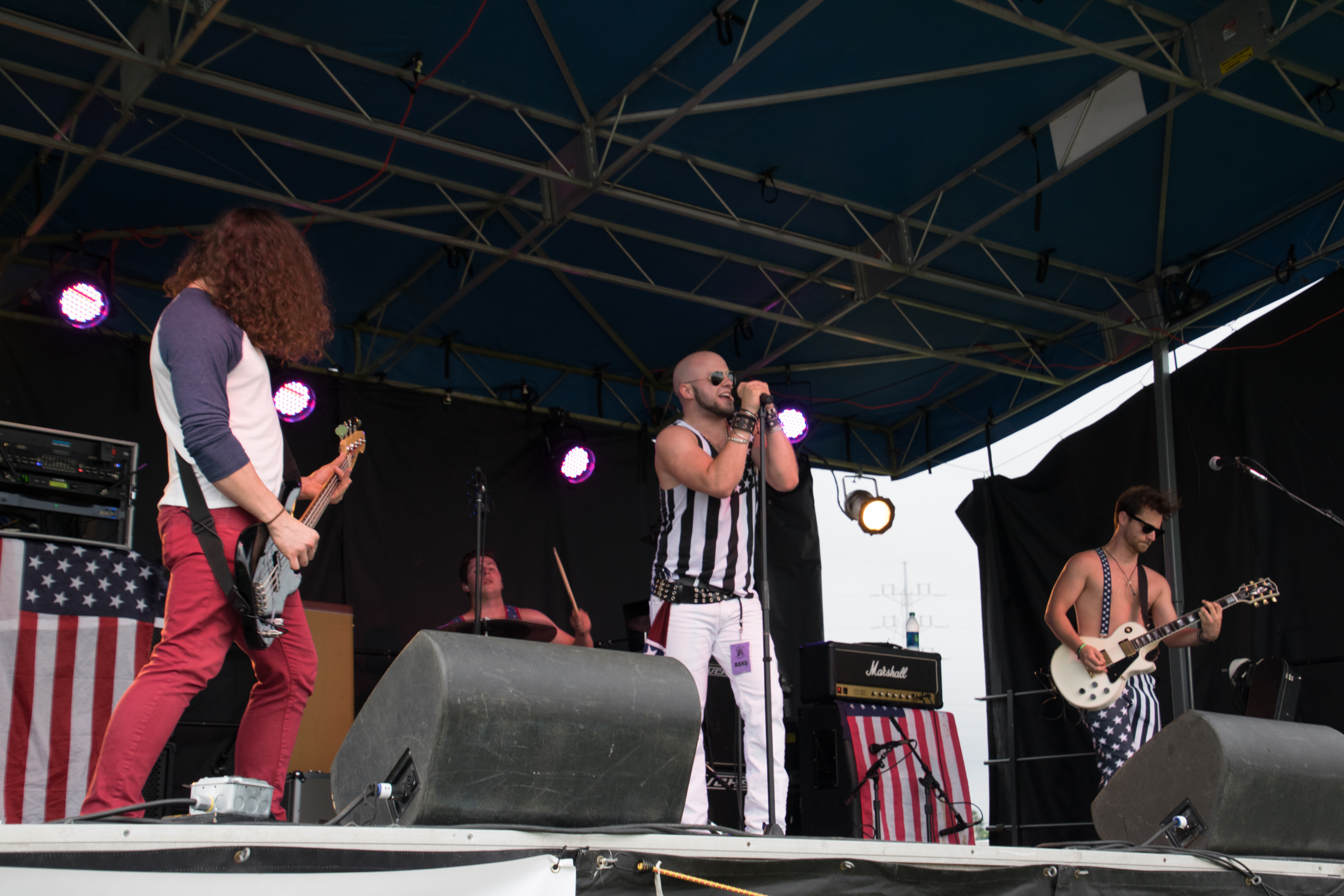

Background information
- Origin: Jackson, Tennessee, United States
- Genres: Southern rock
- Years active: 2012–present
- Label: Unsigned
- Members: Zachary Charles; Dan Drogosh; Joe Maliszewski; Evan Mayo
- Website: mutual-live.com

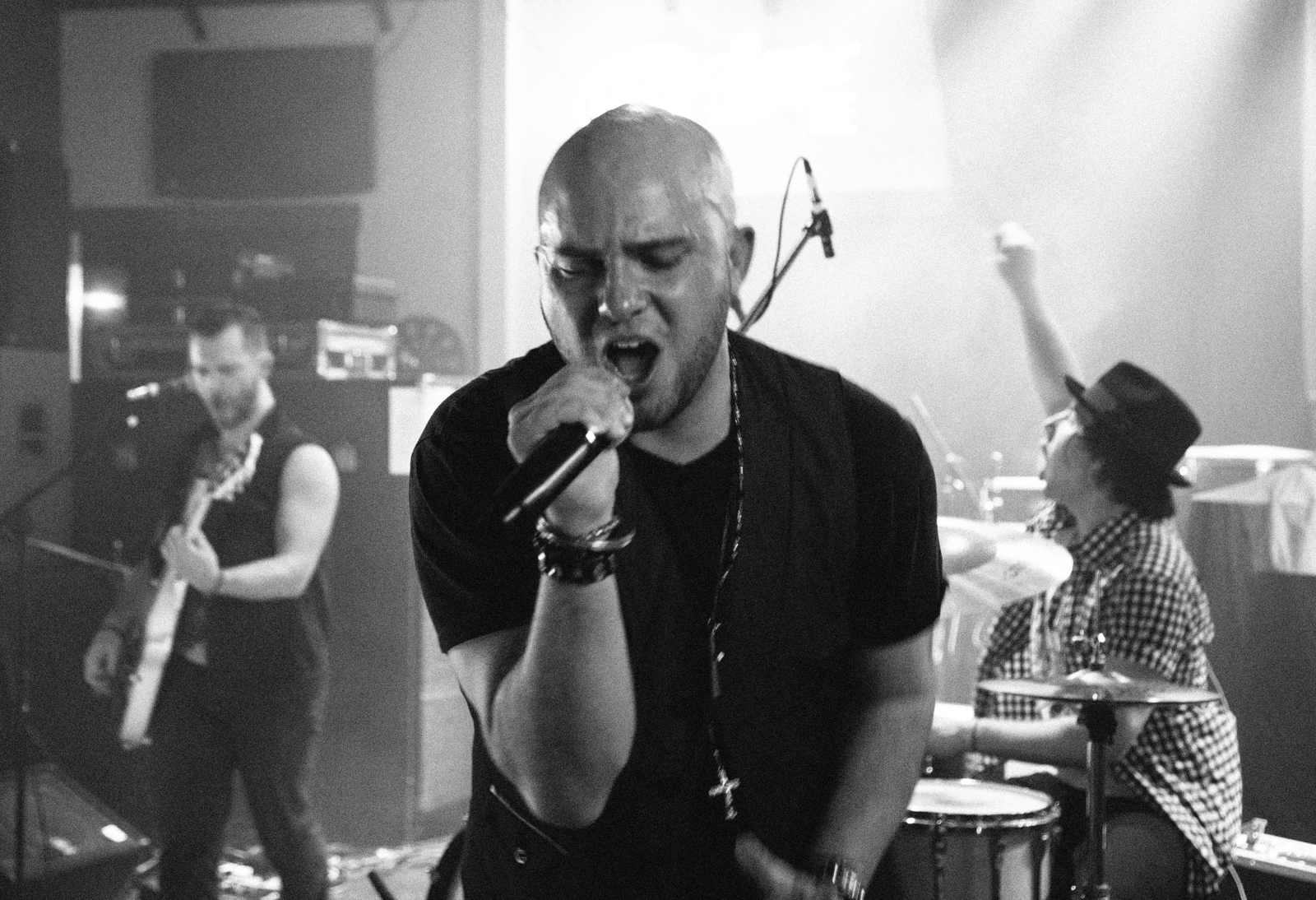
Zachary Charles - Mutual Live

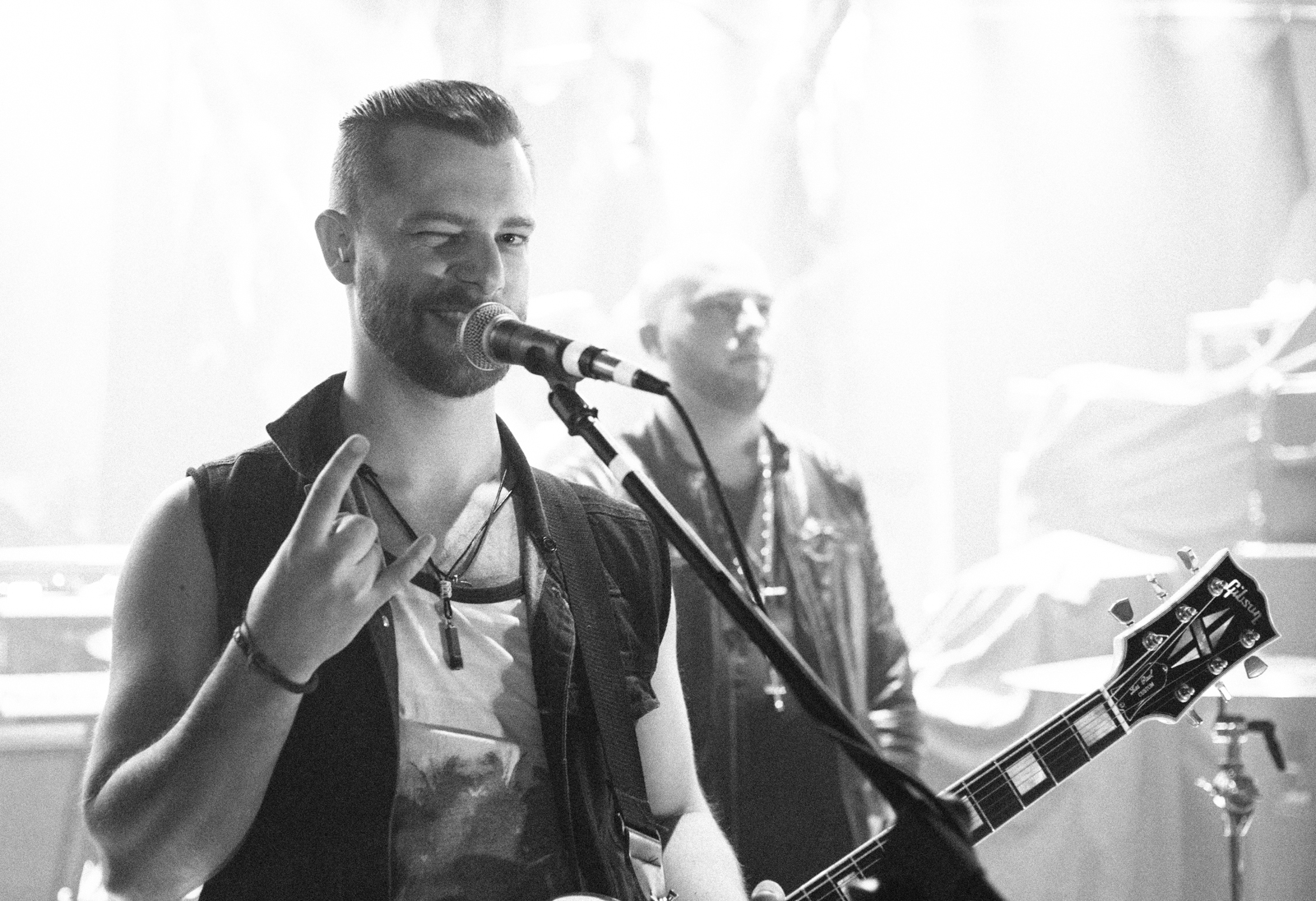
Dan Drogosh - Mutual Live

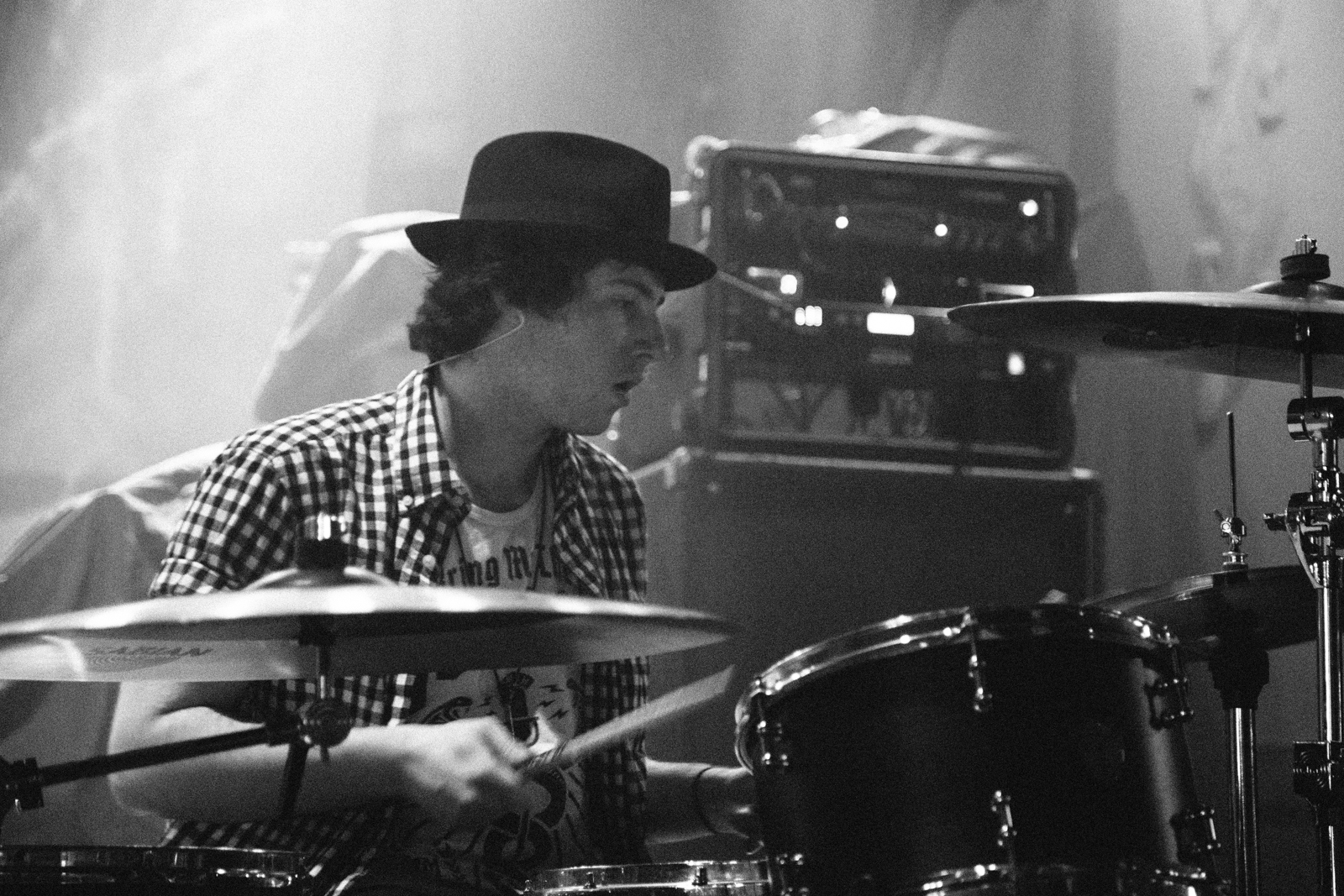
Evan Mayo - Mutual Live

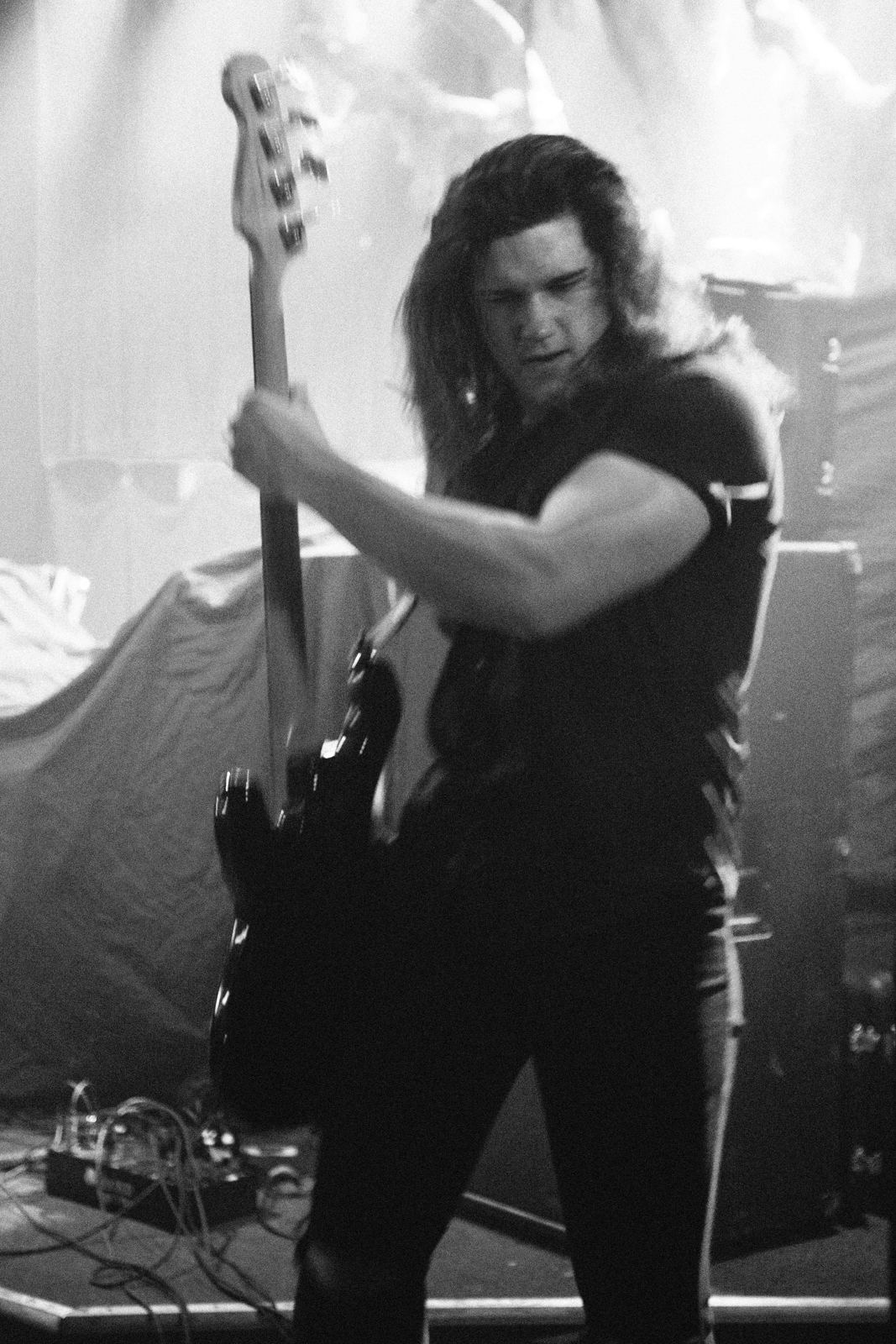
Joe Maliszewski - Mutual Live

Mutual Live is an American Southern rock band from Jackson, Tennessee, founded in 2012 by Kalamazoo, Michigan natives Zachary Charles (vocals) and Dan Drogosh (guitar). The duo later added the still current members, Evan Mayo (Drums) and Joseph Maliszewski (Bass). Since Mutual Live’s inception, they have released 2 EPs: Mutual Live and Mama Raised An Outlaw. They also released 1 Single: Stay.

More recently, the band has transitioned into The Delta Sons, with more releases and videos.

== History ==
=== Northern Roots & Mutual Live - EP ===
In the fall of 2013 while attending the University of Michigan, Zachary Charles Mutual began performing as a solo acoustic act at local fraternities and house parties within the Ann Arbor, Michigan area. It was not long until his childhood friend, Dan Drogosh, was brought up on stage to bring a rhythmic element to the duo. The majority of the house party shows occurred on the University's campus and eventually were streamlined to Drogosh's current residency in East Lansing, Michigan on Michigan State University's campus. The band's current name, Mutual Live, originated from the duo's inability to decide on a group name and agreement to use Mutual's last name for the time being.

Spending time in Ann Arbor’s James Duderstadt studio, the duo recorded their debut EP Mutual Live with recording engineer and lead producer, Eric Garcia. Some of the tracks feature guest performances by Jonathan Petro (drums), Nicole Balsamo (vocals), Jarrett Doe (bass), and Neil Vaughn (bass). With photography and video by Victor Lord. Popular tracks on the Mutual Live EP included “Cold Day in Hell” and “Strange How it Feels”.

=== Move To Nashville ===
In 2013, Mutual and Drogosh ventured south to Tennessee with hopes to advance their musical efforts. Residing in Jackson, Tennessee, the two shared the stage with local Jackson band, Trash the Brand and began playing shows all over the state. Having been introduced to producer/engineer Justin Rimer (former 12 Stones and Breaking Point (band) guitarist), Mutual and Drogosh recorded their first single “Stay” which charted on select AAA Radio stations across the U.S. The song attracted the likes of music executive Jeff Hanson (music executive), who was the former manager of Creed, Sevendust, and Paramore. Working under the Silent Majority Group label for just a short period, Mutual Live decided to part ways with Hanson on good terms. Upon leaving the label, Mutual and Drogosh added new members, Evan Mayo (drums) and Joseph Maliszewski (bass/guitar)both originally from Jackson, Tennessee.

Now a four-piece rock band, the group’s first show was an opening slot for Hawthorne Heights in The Warehouse in Clarksville, Tennessee. Later shows included performing with Zach Myers of the nationally touring rock group, Shinedown, as well as the platinum recording rock group, Saving Abel. The band has performed several festivals and shows with groups such as Full Devil Jacket, Jonathan Singleton, Artifas, and most recently Wayland where they received reception from well known Grand Rapids, Michigan rock station WGRD-FM The group recently had the opportunity of playing the Jacob Barker Music Festival. in support of Cancer Research with the St. Judes Foundation in Jackson, Tennessee.

=== Mama Raised An Outlaw ===
In the later part of 2015, Mutual Live hit the studio to record their first EP, Mama Raised an Outlaw, as a 4-piece line-up. The EP contained 6 southern rock tracks, one of which, “Heart for Ransom” had been previously recorded on their first EP. The album is available on most digital platforms. Music Junkie Press described the group as a revival of "Vibrant Live Rock" with elements of "Southern Rock" within their music.

== Discography ==
=== EPs ===
- Mutual Live (2013, Independent)
- Mama Raised An Outlaw (2015, Independent)

=== Singles ===
- Stay (2015, Independent)
