= 360 deal =

Music industry contract

In the music industry, a 360 deal (from 360° deal) is a business relationship between an artist and a music company. The company agrees to provide financial and other support for the artist, including direct advances as well as support in marketing, promotion, touring and other areas. In return, the artist agrees to give the company a percentage of an increased number of their revenue streams, often including everything from digital and online streaming and live performance to merchandise sales, endorsement deals, and songwriting royalties.

Developed within the 21st century, the business arrangement is an alternative to the traditional recording contract, where the artist usually has control of personal revenue streams (outside the core business relationship around the sharing of revenues in music production). In a 360 deal, a company typically agrees to support an artist upfront in a greater amount than covered by a traditional recording contract, on the condition of receiving a percentage of revenue from the traditional areas as well as additional ones.

At the turn of the century, revenues from recorded music fell dramatically, and the profit margins traditionally associated with the record industry disappeared. The 360 deal, which began to show up in the early 2000s, reflects an attempt by the industry to tap into what traditionally had been the artists' exclusive domain of moneymaking opportunities such as shows, sponsorship deals, or merchandising.

== History ==
According to Jeff Hanson, head of Silent Majority Group, the first new artist 360° deal was created by Hanson along with attorneys Jim Zumwalt and Kent Marcus, and Jim's partner Orville. It was submitted to Atlantic Records for the rock band Paramore while Hanson, Marcus and Zumwalt were employed by the label. Hanson has said there was strong resistance to the deal by both label and band and that he had to fight to make it happen, but believes his efforts were vindicated by the band's subsequent success, saying: "How else would a label have been patient enough to put the band on three straight Warped Tours and down-streamed the band to Fueled by Ramen all while losing millions of dollars?"

360 deals have been made by traditional record companies, as in Robbie Williams's pioneering deal with EMI in 2002. They have also been made between artists and promoters, as with Live Nation's 2007 deal with Madonna and 2008 deal with Jay-Z.

== See also ==
- List of largest music deals
