= Timothy Taylor =

Timothy or Tim Taylor may refer to:

== Sportspeople ==
- Timothy Taylor (cricketer) (born 1961), English cricketer
- Tim Taylor (ice hockey, born 1969), Canadian ice hockey player
- Tim Taylor (ice hockey coach) (1942–2013), American ice hockey coach
- Tim Taylor (rugby union, born 1982), English rugby union player
- Tim Taylor (rugby union, born 1888) (1888–1966), English international rugby union player

== Art ==
- Timothy Taylor (art dealer), British art dealer
- Timothy Taylor (gallery), an international gallery with locations in London and New York, founded by the art dealer Timothy Taylor

== Others ==
- Timothy Taylor (archaeologist) (born 1960), British archaeologist
- Timothy Taylor (economist) (born 1960), American economist and academic professor
- Timothy Taylor (writer) (born 1963), Canadian novelist
- Timothy Taylor Brewery, a British brewery
- Tim Taylor (character), the main character of Home Improvement TV series
- Tim Taylor (newscaster) (born 1940), former newscaster on the news show for the Cleveland, Ohio channel WJW
- Tim Taylor (producer), producer for Channel 4's archaeology series Time Team
- Tim Taylor (politician), member of the Missouri House of Representatives
- Tim Taylor (singer), Canadian country singer-songwriter
- Tim Taylor (1969–1997), guitarist/keyboardist/vocalist for Brainiac (band)
- TJ Taylor (Timothy Lewis Taylor Jr.), American drummer

== See also ==
- Tim Brooke-Taylor (born 1940), British comic actor
