= Fall Down (Tantric song) =

Single by Tantric

from the album The End Begins
- Released: November 8, 2008
- Genre: Post-grunge, hard rock, alternative rock
- Length: 3:35
- Label: Silent Majority Group
- Songwriters: Hugo Ferreira, Erik Leonhardt, Kevin Miller, Joe Pessia, Marcus Ratzenboeck

Tantric singles chronology
"The One" (2008)	"Fall Down" (2008)	"Mind Control" (2009)

"Fall Down" is a song written and recorded by the American rock band Tantric. The song was originally recorded for the shelved Tantric III album, but due to leaving Maverick Records in 2006 the band released the song on their official Myspace page in May 2007 featuring a guest verse by the American country-rap group Nappy Roots, due to the band leaving their label and the original lineup collapsing the song remained unreleased. In November 2008 due to demanding popularity by fans the band re-recorded the song for a deluxe version of their album The End Begins but without the verse from Nappy Roots. The song was officially released as the third and final single from The End Begins on November 8, 2008.

== Charts ==
Chart (2009)	Peak position
US Mainstream Rock (Billboard)	34
