= A Promise to Burn =

Studio album by Framing Hanley
- Released: May 25, 2010
- Recorded: 2009
- Length: 51:27/58:41 (with bonus tracks)
- Label: Silent Majority, Warner

Framing Hanley chronology
The Moment (2007)	A Promise to Burn (2010)	The Sum of Who We Are (2014)

Singles from A Promise to Burn
- 1. "You Stupid Girl" Released: April 6, 2010; 2. "Back to Go Again (UK Single)" Released: April 12, 2010; 3. "WarZone" Released: February 21, 2011

Professional ratings
Review scores
Source	Rating
Allmusic	3/5 stars
Alternative Press	3/5 stars
AbsolutePunk.net	(71%)
idobi	3/5 stars
Rock Sound	7/10 stars

A Promise to Burn is the second studio album by American alternative rock band Framing Hanley, released on May 25, 2010. The album also contains a DVD showing the behind the scenes making of the record. The album debuted at #57 on the Billboard 200 chart.

== Track listing ==
1. "Intro" – 1:07
2. "The Promise" – 3:46
3. "Wake Up" – 3:58
4. "Bittersweet Sundown" – 3:31
5. "WarZone" – 3:47
6. "You Stupid Girl" – 3:34
7. "Weight of the World" – 3:34
8. "Fool with Dreams" – 4:01
9. "Back to Go Again" – 3:19
10. "Livin' So Divine" – 3:37
11. "You" – 3:26
12. "Photographs and Gasoline" – 5:43
13. "The Burn" – 5:04

iTunes deluxe edition

1. "Can Always Quit Tomorrow" – 3:32
2. "Pretty Faces" – 3:42
