= Honey (Brother Sundance EP) =

EP by Brother Sundance
- Released: August 11, 2017
- Recorded: December 2016–June 2017
- Studio: Criteria Studios, Miami, Florida
- Genre: Pop; alternative; indie
- Length: 18:22
- Label: Silent Majority Group
- Producer: Brother Sundance

Honey is the first EP by American pop artist and producer Brother Sundance. The EP was released on August 11, 2017, on Silent Majority Group, and features the singles "Blind" and "The Hurt".

== Track listing ==
All tracks are written by Brother Sundance.

No.	Title	Length
1.	"Monsters"	4:06
2.	"Blind"	3:24
3.	"You & Me (Featuring Summer Wright)"	2:51
4.	"The Hurt"	3:32
5.	"Bad Love"	4:23

== Personnel ==
- Brother Sundance: - programming (tracks 1–5), lead vocals, backing vocals (track 3, 4), guitar (track 5), synth bass (track 5), synths (track 5), gang vocals (track 1, 5)

Additional musicians:

- Max Landis - guitar (track 1,4), bass (track 5)
- Summer Wright - vocals (tracks 1–4)
- Kristina Palacios - vocals (track 1, 3 and 5)
- Ella Talerico - backing vocals (track 1, 5)
- Jamie Peacon - backing vocals (track 1, 4)
- Matthew Schneider - programming (track 2)

Production:

- Brother Sundance — executive production, production
- Paul Kronk — vocal production (tracks 1–3), engineering (tracks 1–3)
- Marc Lee — mixing, engineering (track 5)
- Chris Gehringer — mastering

Additional personnel:

- Rick Schmidt — A&R (tracks 1, 3)
- Brother Sundance — art direction, design
- Sebastian Borberg — photography
- David Herrera — photography
