= Major League Baseball 2K10 =

2010 video game

- North American cover art, featuring Evan Longoria
- Developers: Visual Concepts; Wii: 2K China
- Publisher: 2K
- Series: MLB 2K
- Platforms: Windows, Xbox 360, PlayStation 2, PlayStation 3, PlayStation Portable, Wii, Nintendo DS
- Release: NA: March 2, 2010
- Genre: Sports
- Modes: Single-player, Multiplayer

Major League Baseball 2K10 or, in short, MLB 2K10, is an MLB licensed baseball simulation video game developed by Visual Concepts and published by 2K. MLB 2K10 was available for Microsoft Windows, Xbox 360, PlayStation 2, PlayStation 3, PlayStation Portable, Wii, and Nintendo DS. The game was released on March 2, 2010.

== Updates ==
New to the series is the "My Player" feature, a career mode in which the player shepherds a player's career from the minors to the majors. Other features from the previous game have been improved or tweaked, including hitting and pitching. The game also features "MLB Today", an online ticker that tracks real-life Major League Baseball news and scores. With the MLB Today feature you can also play the same game that is being played in the real MLB. For example, if the New York Yankees are playing the Boston Red Sox and CC Sabathia is pitching, in the game he will be pitching along with the same lineup that is being used.

The commentary has been improved as well, which analyze stats from the current year, the previous year, the previous series, and so forth. The crowd noise has also been reworked and sounds better than any previous version.

The Franchise Mode has been enhanced as well. Players can choose multiple teams and run their franchise, and can make staff personnel decisions. There are now 40 man rosters for Spring Training and September call ups. Players also have a minor league system that run from Single A through Triple A. Players can draft players from the high school, college, and amateur league level. Teams now receive compensatory draft picks from Type A and B free agents as well. Players can invite friends to play against them within the Franchise Mode, as well as online player updates.

Like NBA 2K10, Major League Baseball 2K10 celebrates its 10th anniversary, going back to its Sega Dreamcast origins as World Series Baseball, though the series began in 1994 with the Sega Genesis release of World Series Baseball.

== Commentators ==
The commentary is delivered by Steve Phillips, Gary Thorne, and John Kruk. For the Wii version, Kruk is not in the commentary booth.

== Cover athlete ==
Tampa Bay Rays third baseman and Gold Glove Award winner Evan Longoria was announced as the cover athlete for 2K10, replacing two-time NL Cy Young Award winner Tim Lincecum from MLB 2K9.

== Reception ==
Reception

Aggregate score
Aggregator	Score
Metacritic	76/100 (X360); 74/100 (PS3); 53/100 (WII)

Review scores
Publication	Score
Game Informer	(X360) 7.75/10
GameSpot	(PS3) 7/10 (X360) 7.5/10 (PC) 5.5/10 (WII) 5/10
GamesRadar+	(PS3/X360) 4/5 (PC) 4/5
GameZone	(X360) 7/10
IGN	(PS3/X360) 7.0/10 (PC) 7.3/10 (PS2) 5.5/10 (PSP) 4.5/10 (WII) 5/10 (DS) 2.8/10
Nintendo World Report	(WII) 4.5/10
Official Xbox Magazine (US)	(X360) 8/10

MLB 2K10 received mixed to positive reviews. GameZone's Michael Lafferty gave the game a 7/10, saying "In the past, the 2K series was hampered by a lot of little things. The developers obviously put a lot of time in improving the overall gameplay and it shows. The new modes are fun but need some attention to iron out bugs, and there are some areas where the errors are just downright contrary to the game of baseball. On the surface, baseball seems a simple game, but to the baseball fan, the layers of complexity are what create that overall feeling that is Major League Baseball."

== Promotion ==
In early February, game publisher 2K Sports announced a contest where players had a chance to win $1,000,000 for pitching a perfect game on the Xbox 360 or PS3 versions of the game. The feat was finally achieved by Wade McGilberry of Mobile, Alabama who used the Atlanta Braves pitcher Kenshin Kawakami.

== Soundtrack ==
1. Social Distortion - "Bad Luck"
2. Tantric - "Down and Out"
3. Black Keys - "Your Touch"
4. Black Crowes - "Go Faster"
5. Daughtry - "Every Time You Turn Around"
6. Cage the Elephant - "Judas"
7. Jet - "Start the Show"
8. Iggy Pop - "Lust for Life"
9. Boss Martians - "Hey Hey Yeah Yeah"
10. Hotel St. George - "It's the Blues"
11. LCD Soundsystem - "Time to Get Away"
12. Phoenix - "Lisztomania"
13. The Sugarhill Gang - "Rapper's Delight"
14. Black Sheep - "The Choice Is Yours (Revisited)"
15. Ryan Adams - "Magick"
16. Pearl Jam - "The Fixer" (exclusive to Xbox 360 version)
