= Bruce LaFrance =

Bruce LaFrance (born in Bay City, Michigan) is an American bassist.

== Career ==
In 2005, when Tantric bassist Jesse Vest had left the band, LaFrance was suggested as a replacement. In January 2006, LaFrance traveled with Tantric and hard rock group Drowning Pool to Seoul, South Korea to play several shows for U.S. troops stationed along the Korean Demilitarized Zone. In March 2006, Tantric parted ways with Maverick Records which was collapsing. Maverick had postponed the release of the third record which caused much internal strife in the band already strained by personal and musical frustration. During this time LaFrance was in a side project called "State Of The Art" with Hugo Ferreira (Tantric), Joe Pessia (Dramagods), Marcus Ratzenboeck, Kevin Miller (Fuel). In May 2007 Bruce left Tantric and State Of The Art to form Interchange with original Tantric/Days of the New guitarist Todd Whitener. State Of The Art became the "new" Tantric. LaFrance had also been working with Louisville based band Nova Red since October 2005. Nova Red released their first album "No Regrets" produced by Malcolm Springer in October 2007. In 2008 LaFrance was recording and performing with both Interchange and Nova Red. Interchange has disbanded while Nova Red still remains active playing occasional shows and demoing new material. While he is not credited on any Tantric albums, he does claim to have co-written three songs on The End Begins album and played on some tracks.

As of 2011, Bruce moved back home and has resumed being a working cover/hired gun musician and hosting various benefits. He has played in several bands in Mid Michigan including fill-in spots with recording artists Deepfield and still plays with long running original project Feeding the Machine with guitarist Kevin McCreery (Uncle Kracker), who died in 2017, and drummer Fran MacMillan. He also continued his own sound engineering business in Michigan (called Level 47 Productions) that he began in Louisville, KY in 2007. He was recently voted Best Rock Bass Player for 2013 by the Bay Area Review, an award he also won in 2000.
