= Framing Hanley =

American rock band

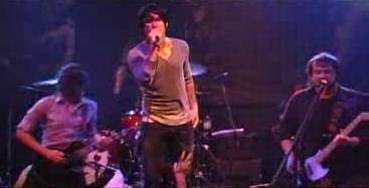
- Framing Hanley performing in 2010

Background information
- Origin: Nashville, Tennessee, U.S.
- Genres: Alternative rock; post-grunge; hard rock; post-hardcore (early); emo (early)
- Years active: 2005–2015; 2018–present
- Labels: Silent Majority Group; Thermal; Imagen; Independent Label Group
- Members: Kenneth Nixon; Jonathan Stoye; Nic Brooks
- Past members: Brandon Wootten; Chris Vest; Tim Huskinson; Luke McDuffee; Ryan Belcher; Shad Teems
- Website: framinghanley.com

Framing Hanley is an American rock band formed in Nashville, Tennessee in 2005. They released their first studio album in August 2007, titled The Moment.

Their sound has been described as "emo-tinged modern rock" by AllMusic.

== History ==
=== Formation and The Moment (2005–2009) ===
Lead singer & songwriter Kenneth Nixon, guitarists Tim Huskinson and Brandon Wooten, bassist Luke McDuffee and drummer Chris Vest came together to form Framing Hanley and quickly gained a large following in Nashville. First formed in 2005 (Under the name Embers Fade), the band posted some demos of their songs on the band's Myspace page. During this time, they played a style that was described as "a blend of post-grunge and stylish hard hard rock" by AllMusic. In November 2006, these demos were discovered by Brett Hestla, former Creed bassist and frontman of Dark New Day. Hestla helped the young Nashville based quintet record a 2-song demo in his Florida studio which he showed to Jeff Hanson (Creed, Sevendust, Paramore) and his record label Silent Majority Group. In an interview with HitQuarters Hanson said he "flipped out" when he heard the song "Hear Me Now" and decided immediately he wanted to sign them. The following day he went to see the band play in Nashville and claims that in his rush to secure the band's signatures he wrote up their deal on a napkin. Hanson became not only their label boss but also their manager, says the band.

In June 2008, Tim left the band due to recurring back problems and to pursue other endeavors in his life. He was replaced by a friend of the band, guitarist Ryan Belcher. This was originally a temporary arrangement but Ryan soon became a permanent member of the band.

=== A Promise to Burn (2009–2011) ===
In early November 2009, Framing Hanley entered the studio to start working on the sophomore record, A Promise to Burn. In an interview with alternativeaddiction.com, lead singer Kenneth Nixon stated that "The album tells a story that a lot of us have been through, where you have to have everything taken away from you before you can be humbled and know how lucky you are, it's sad that it's like that, but it's true in a lot of people's cases." Nixon says the band has a lot to prove with the new album, foremost that the band is more than just 'that rock band that covered Lil Wayne's song "Lollipop". "Three years later when one song that they are remembering you for is a cover song, it kinda leaves a bad taste in your mouth", said Nixon. "That song did a lot of things for our band, but it was really just something that we were doing for fun." Nixon says the band was discouraged when the band re-released their debut single "Hear Me Now" following the success of "Lollipop" and saw very little response. "It leaves us with something to prove on this record. We are not just a band that covers songs, we want to prove we are a band that writes rock songs that we care about, and that is what we did with this record", says the band.

In December 2009, the band won the Best Modern Rock Band at the Top In Rock Awards. Their first single "You Stupid Girl" is available on iTunes and all digital retailers now. According to their Twitter page, "Back to Go Again" is the 1st single to be released in the United Kingdom instead of "You Stupid Girl". A Promise to Burn was released in stores, on iTunes, and all music retailers on May 25. The iTunes deluxe version contains two bonus tracks, "Can Always Quit Tomorrow" and "Pretty Faces". The band also contributed a cover of the Nirvana song "In Bloom" for Kerrang!'s cover album of Nevermind, released in their special edition issue celebrating the 20th anniversary of the grunge act's breakthrough release.

=== The Sum of Who We Are (2011–2015) ===
Through Facebook and Twitter, the band has uploaded a video explaining everything that has happened to them in the past year. Nixon explains the band leaving their record label and the struggle to make another album. They created a Kickstarter campaign to help fund their record, believing that their fans could cover the cost of making the new album by only asking a dollar per fan.

Framing Hanley enter the studio to record their successfully funded album. According to their official Twitter feed, and other fan sites, Framing Hanley has named Robert Venable as the mixing engineer for this album. In August 2012, Framing Hanley revealed the title of their third album would be The Sum of Who We Are. In August 2013, Framing Hanley announced the departure of Luke McDuffee as bassist. The original release date of the album was October 22, however due to legal issues it had been postponed. They had announced a new record deal and that the album's new release date would be April 29, 2014. There will be a single "Criminal". The day before the release of the album Billboard streamed the album. In late May 2014 they released a music video for "Criminal".

=== Hiatus (2015–2018) ===
The band announced that they were going on a hiatus via Facebook in 2015. Lead singer Kenneth Nixon announced a reunion in 2018.

=== Reunion and Envy (2018–present) ===
Exactly after three years of the hiatus, the band announced their reunion via Facebook on April 11, 2018, and announced their comeback. Their album entitled Envy was released on February 21, 2020.

On March 9, 2023, they released a new single called "Start a Fire".

The band performed at the Sonic Temple music festival in Columbus, Ohio in May of 2025. The band are confirmed to be making an appearance at Welcome to Rockville, which will take place in Daytona Beach, Florida in May 2026.

== Members ==
Current members

- Kenneth Nixon – lead vocals, piano, rhythm guitar (2005–present)
- Jonathan Stoye – lead guitar, bass, backing vocals (2013–present)
- Nic Brooks – guitar, piano, programming (2018–present)

Touring members

- Matt Naff – drums (2022–present)

Former members

- Tim Huskinson – lead guitar (2005–2007)
- Luke McDuffee – bass, backing vocals (2005–2013)
- Brandon Wootten – guitars, backing vocals (2005–2015)
- Chris Vest – drums (2005–2015)
- Shad Teems – drums, piano, backing vocals (2018–2021)
- Ryan Belcher – lead guitar, piano, backing vocals (2007–2019)

== Discography ==
=== Albums ===
==== Studio albums ====
List of studio albums, with selected chart positions
Title	Album details	Peak chart positions		
Title	Album details	US	US Alt.	US Rock
The Moment	Released: May 15, 2007 (US); Label: Silent Majority Group; Formats: CD, digital download	169	—	—
A Promise to Burn	Released: May 25, 2010 (US); Label: Silent Majority Group; Formats: CD, digital download	57	9	15
The Sum of Who We Are	Released: April 29, 2014 (US); Label: Imagen Records; Formats: CD, LP, digital download	79	14	24
Envy	Released: February 21, 2020 (US); Label: Thermal Entertainment; Formats: CD, digital download	—	—	—
"—" denotes a recording that did not chart or was not released in that territory.

=== Singles ===
List of singles, with selected chart positions and certifications, showing year released and album name
Title	Year	Peak chart positions					Certifications	Album
Title	Year	US	US Act. Rock	US Alt.	US Main. Rock	US Pop	Certifications	Album
"Lollipop" (Lil Wayne cover)	2008	82	—	22	27	62	RIAA: Gold	The Moment
"Hear Me Now"	2009	—	40	—	—	—		The Moment
"You Stupid Girl"	2010	—	35	—	—	—		A Promise to Burn
"Back to Go Again"	2010	—	—	—	—	—		A Promise to Burn
"WarZone"	2011	—	—	—	—	—		A Promise to Burn
"Criminal"	2014	—	—	—	22	—		The Sum of Who We Are
"Collide"	2015	—	—	—	39	—		The Sum of Who We Are
"Puzzle Pieces"	2018	×	×	×	×	×		Envy
"Throwing Knives"	2019	×	×	×	×	×		Envy
"Forgiveness Is an Art"	2020	×	×	×	×	×		Envy
"Start a Fire"	2023	×	×	×	×	×		Envy (Deluxe Edition)
"Say Less"	2023	×	×	×	×	×		Non-album single
"Hear Me Now Redux" (feat. Jeff Hardy)	2024	×	×	×	×	×		Envy (Deluxe Edition)
"Mean It (Photographs and Gasoline Part 2)"	2025	×	×	×	×	×		Do You Feel Guilty Being Okay?
"Poor Lil Me"	2025	×	×	×	×	×		Do You Feel Guilty Being Okay?
"—" denotes a recording that did not chart or was not released in that territory.

== Music videos ==
Title	Year	Director(s)	Album
"Hear Me Now" (version 1)	2007	Unknown	The Moment
"Lollipop"	2008	Mason Dixon	The Moment
"Hear Me Now" (version 2)	2009	Mason Dixon	The Moment
"You Stupid Girl"	2010	Unknown	A Promise to Burn
"Photograph and Gasoline"	2010	Unknown	A Promise to Burn
"Back to Go Again"	2010	Unknown	A Promise to Burn
"Criminal"	2014	Mason Dixon	The Sum of Who We Are
"Twisted Halos"	2014	Wade Spencer	The Sum of Who We Are
"Mean It (Photographs and Gasoline Part 2)"	2025	David Dutton	Do You Feel Guilty Being Okay?
"Poor Lil Me"	2025	David Dutton	Do You Feel Guilty Being Okay?
"The Reckoning"	2026	Embryo	Do You Feel Guilty Being Okay?
