= Brother Sundance =

American singer-songwriter (born 1998)

Brother Sundance Brother Sundance
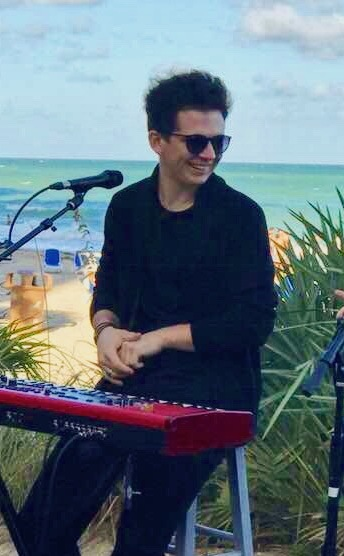
- Brother Sundance performing acoustic in Miami, Florida

Background information
- Also known as: Brother Sundance
- Born: Rylan Talerico; October 2, 1998 (age 27); Fort Lauderdale, Florida, U.S.
- Genres: Pop · Alternative
- Occupation: Record producer · Singer · Songwriter · Musician
- Instrument: Vocals · Piano · Guitar · Drums · Bass · Synthesizer
- Years active: 2015-Present
- Label: Warner Bros. Records · Silent Majority Group
- Website: brothersundance.com

Rylan Talerico, known professionally as Brother Sundance, is an American singer, songwriter, producer, multi-instrumentalist, and Warner Bros. Records recording artist.

He first gained recognition following the release of debut self-produced EP Honey, released on August 11, 2017 through Silent Majority Group.

== Early life ==
Talerico was born on October 2, 1998, in Boca Raton, Florida.

The oldest of two children born into a musical family, Rylan began playing the drums at age 2 under the influence of his father Justin Talerico, a longtime drummer and respected member of the family's local music and arts community.

Throughout his teenage years Talerico was a dedicated student of music, serving as frontman and guitarist for South Florida underground punk band Wallace, as well as teaching guitar, drums and bass at a local music school throughout high school.

Talerico describes this period of his life as something of a turning point for him, telling PR Newswire "In my freshman year, I picked up a guitar and that was it… From that point forward, all I could do was music."

He has since relocated to Nashville, Tennessee, where he currently resides.

== Career ==
=== Brother Sundance ===
At age 17, Talerico disbanded South Florida underground punk band Wallace to focus on developing his rapidly evolving musical interests, exploring a more pop-oriented writing, recording and producing style.

Adapting his childhood family nickname, Brother Sundance , he wrote and produced his debut EP Honey in the bedroom of his family home in Fort Lauderdale, Florida, throughout the spring of 2017.
While mixing the record at Criteria Studios in Miami, Florida, Talerico was introduced to Jeff Hanson—former artist manager of critically acclaimed artists Paramore, Creed, Alter Bridge & Sevendust—and was signed to Hanson's record label Silent Majority Group shortly after.

=== 2017–2018: Honey ===
After roughly a year of writing and recording, Brother Sundance released his debut EP Honey on August 11, 2017, garnering generally favorable reviews from critics and music fans alike.

In the first week of Honey's release, Brother Sundance was featured as Apple Music's New Artist of the Week in August 2017, gaining the album track 'Monsters' a spot on Apple's Alternative A-List playlist shortly after, featured alongside Muse, Imagine Dragons, Bishop Briggs and others.

Following these achievements, tracks from Honey were featured on Elton John's The Rocket Hour on Beats 1 in promotion of a string of festival dates scheduled in support of the album.

Following 'Blind's radio and streaming success, Brother Sundance was asked to perform in support of Biffy Clyro at Radio 104.5's 2017 Endless Summer Show in Philadelphia, Pennsylvania, followed by an appearance in support of Cage the Elephant and Weezer at Riptide Music Festival in Fort Lauderdale, Florida, before closing out 2017 supporting Joywave at KRAB 106.1's Christmas concert at The Fox Theater in Bakersfield, California.

As of March 2018, Honey's lead single 'Blind' has received over 5,000,000 plays across streaming platforms, receiving critical acclaim and accolades from a wide range of publications including Huffington Post, Business Insider, PR Newswire and many more.

=== Appearances in media ===
The Brother Sundance song 'You & Me' was used in an episode of the ABC Family/Freeform drama The Fosters titled "Many Roads", which aired in the show's final season on March 13, 2018. The track was also added to the show's official Spotify playlist shortly after.

== Discography ==
=== Extended plays ===
- Honey

=== Singles ===
- "Blind"
- "The Hurt"

=== As performer ===
- Honey by Brother Sundance
- Strange Open Land by Alex Di Leo
