= Blacklite District =

American musician

- Origin: Spearfish, South Dakota, United States
- Genre: Rock
- Years active: 2011–Present
- Labels: Duetti; AK19 Entertainment; Silent Majority Group
- Members: Kyle Pfeiffer; Justin Sundlin; Clinton Cunanan
- Website: blacklitedistrict.net

Blacklite District is an American rock band formed in Spearfish, South Dakota, and is the "stage name" or "persona" of vocalist and songwriter Kyle Pfeiffer. The band has four songs which have reached Top 40 on the Billboard Mainstream Rock Chart, and has accumulated over a billion streams.

== Career ==
=== Formation and This is Where it Ends (2003–2013) ===
Kyle Pfeiffer formed a "band" with childhood friends as a pre-teen in 2003, and met Roman James in 5th grade, who soon joined the group as well. The two would often switch out members and change the parts they played until settling on James singing and Pfeiffer playing guitar and vocals. In 2011 Blacklite District met with producer Stephen Short, who produced the "This Is Where It Ends" demo EP at the Sonic Ranch in 2011.

=== Worldwide Controversy (2012–2014) ===
In 2012, they were discovered by Creed manager Jeff Hanson who signed them with Silent Majority Group. Hanson referred the band to former Creed bassist Brett Hestla, who produced their debut album. They released the Single "Take Me To The Grave" in 2012, followed by With Me Now on July 10, 2013. They released the EP "With Me Now" on October 13, 2013, which featured the first five songs from their debut album. They went on tour with the bands Saving Abel and Art of Dying. They released their debut album "Worldwide Controversy" the following year. Their first charting single, "With Me Now", peaked at #34 on the Billboard Mainstream Rock Airplay chart in 2013. Pfeiffer considers the release of "With Me Now" and “Take Me to the Grave” a "turning point" for the band.

=== To Whom It May Concern (2015–2016) ===
The band got into some legal trouble with the band causing them to cancel their tour and Pfeiffer to start the side project "Paradise Over". They released their second album, To Whom It May Concern, on October 7, 2016. Pfeiffer shifted to vocals and James switched to guitar and bass. The album leaned more towards hip hop and pop. Both "The Struggle" and "Broken Souls" received significant radio play across America.

On October 10, 2016, Rock Rage Radio interviewed Pfeiffer. In the interview, Pfeiffer discussed the band's newly released album 'To Whom it May Concern' and the song 'The Struggle', saying that the meaning of it is about him losing his mother to a drug overdose when he was a little kid. He also discussed Nightcore versions of the band's songs, crediting them as significantly boosting the band's visibility. He emphasizes the band's commitment to authenticity and their global reach.

=== Instant Gratification (2017) ===
In 2017, Blacklite District released their third album, titled Instant Gratification. Their single "Cold as Ice" reached #35 on Billboard Mainstream Rock Airplay in January 2018. The band collaborated with Minecraft animator Rainimator to produce animated music videos for their songs. The music video for Cold as Ice has over 80 million views on YouTube. They also had a single called “Living in a Nightmare”.

=== Through the Ages (2018) ===
The song "Hard Pill to Swallow" was released by the band on October 10, 2018, as the lead single for their fourth album, Through the Ages, stating that the song ushered in a "new era" for Blacklite District. The 10-song album featured very little guitar work. The band also began working with DZFX Media for their live-action music videos.

=== Souled Out (2019) ===
The band released "Never Came Around" on March 22, 2019, followed by "Me Against the World" on September 6, 2019, as the lead singles for their fifth album, titled Souled Out. The latter was featured on SiriusXM Octane.

=== You're Welcome (2020) ===
In early 2020, Blacklite District announced that Pfeiffer and James would be going their separate ways. On July 17, 2020, the band released You're Welcome. The single "Falling" peaked No. 34 on the Billboard Mainstream Rock charts. It was accompanied by a Minecraft-themed music video which peaked at #3 trending on YouTube.

Blacklite District considers this the darkest spot in his career, "With Me Now" specifically highlighting his heavy substance abuse.

=== 1990 (2021) ===
Pfeiffer checked into drug rehab on January 6, 2021. While in rehab he continued to write songs. On December 31, 2021, Blacklite District released the album 1990, produced by Brett Hestla "Gotta Get Outta Here" was released on October 1 as the lead single. The song spent 16 weeks in the top-40 of the Billboard Mainstream Rock chart and garnered over 10 million combined streams.

=== Blacklite District - XL & You're Welcome - XL (2022–2023) ===
In mid-2022, the band announced that drummer Graham Spillman would be returning to record drums on the five bonus tracks of 1990 - XL. In November of the same year and January of the next, Pfeiffer and Spillman collaborated with long-time producer Brett Hestla and new guitarist Justin Sundlin to record remakes of old tracks, dubbed "XL" tracks. The band released "Blacklite District - XL" on June 9, 2023, and "You're Welcome - XL" on December 8, 2023.

=== You Can Do Better (2024–2025) ===
In late 2023, Blacklite District began recording their eighth album in a studio jointly owned by them and the band Judd Hoos. The album is the first to feature new bassist Clinton Cunanan. The album was released on May 3, 2024.

In January 2025, Blacklite District announced an agreement with Duetti, a music rights management company, getting a $1.2 million deal for their back catalog.

=== Whatever Happens Next (2026-present) ===
In April 2026, Blacklite District released their ninth studio album, Whatever Happens Next. Prior to the full release, the songs "Paper Towels", "Man Down", "Fortune Favors the Bold", and "Chasing Ghosts" were released as singles.

This album notably came out after the lead singer, Kyle Pfeiffer's divorce, the themes of feeling lost and betrayed being very present in the album title and songs.

== Chart history ==
Billboard US charting

- "With Me Now" (2014) - No. 34 Mainstream Rock Songs
- "Cold As Ice" (2018) - No. 35 Mainstream Rock Songs
- "Falling" (2020) - No. 33 Mainstream Rock Songs
- "Gotta Get Outta Here" (2022) - No. 31 Mainstream Rock Songs

== Members ==
Current members

- Kyle Pfeiffer - lead vocals, backing vocals, guitar, production (2011–present)
- Justin Sundlin - backing vocals, guitar (2022–present)
- Clinton Cunanan - bass guitar, backing vocals, live DJ (2023–present)

Former members

- Nick "Roman" James - lead vocals, backing vocals, guitar, bass guitar, (2016-2020)
- Graham Spillman - drums, backing vocals (2012-2013, 2022-2023)

Current touring and session musicians

- Chance Jones - drums (2014, 2023–present)

Former touring and session musicians

- Oniel "Kane" Laffitte - bass, backing vocals (2013-2014)
- Christian Mardini - drums (2013-2014)
- Angel Delgado - drums (2014)
- Robert "Rob Shiner" Rosenau - dj table (2016-2017)
- Myles Clayborne - drums (2023)

== Discography ==
Studio albums

- Worldwide Controversy (2014)
- To Whom It May Concern (2016)
- Instant Gratification (2017)
- Through the Ages (2018)
- Souled Out (2019)
- You're Welcome (2020)
- 1990 (2021)
- 1990 - XL (2022)
- Blacklite District - XL (2023)
- You're Welcome - XL (2023)
- You Can Do Better (2024)
- Whatever Happens Next (2026)
