= Jeff Hanson (music executive) =

American music executive

Jeff Hanson is an American music industry executive. He is the founder and CEO of the Silent Majority Group label.

He got his start as a classic alternative DJ, club owner, and concert promoter. He is the former manager of Creed, Paramore, Alter Bridge and Sevendust, and the company JHMP currently manages Lotus Crush, and Terry McDermott (Runner up on The Voice) and producer Peter Klett(Candlebox)among others. In 2006 he set up the independent Orlando, Florida-based label Silent Majority Group, which has released albums from Framing Hanley, Candlebox, Tantric, Brother Sundance, Blacklite District, and Veio.

== Career ==
Hanson discovered Creed in December 1997 when they played live at Floyd's Music Store in Tallahassee, Florida. At the time the band was unknown and their set-list contained mostly covers and two original songs. Hanson signed Creed to his artist management company, and A&R'd and managed Creed from that point on. Soon after he asked friend John Kurzweg, to produce the band's first record and according to Hanson, in an interview with HitQuarters, the album cost only $6,000 to make and eventually sold around 6 million copies. Creed went on to sell over 35 million records and millions of tickets worldwide. During this time, Hanson served as executive producer of both The Scorpion King and Scream 3 soundtracks. Hanson also served as A&R consultant for Island Def Jam during Lyor Cohen's tenure in the early 2000s. Shortly after forming JHMP Hanson also took on artists: Sevendust, Alterbridge, Virgos Merlot and Full Devil Jacket.

Hanson formed JHMP in 1998 and founded, funded, developed, did the A&R, and managed Creed on Wind Up records, as well as Virgos Merlot on Atlantic records, Mile on Columbia records, Full Devil Jacket on Island records and SR71 on RCA records. He then released his first independent label release in 2002 under his newly formed Silent Majority Group label with artist Storyside B in a partnership with Gotee / EMI and subsequently Big Dismal on in a partnership with Wind-Up records, both artists were faith based and achieved multiple Christian Rock top 10 hits including #1 songs with both artists. As part of his SMG label venture he did A&R for Island / Def Jam and also did A&R for Wind Up records where he signed the bands Breaking Point and Dust For Life. In 2003, Hanson's JHMP management company was asked to manage the, then, 14-year-old Hayley Williams Williams was then taken to Atlantic Records and signed to the label by Jason Flom. Hanson created the first new artist 360 deal together with entertainment lawyers the late Orville Almon and Jim Zumwalt between Paramore and Atlantic Records. Paramore. Paramore went on to sell over 5 million records worldwide. His next signings to the company were Mute Math and Family Force 5, both faith based artists as well. He was joined by radio program director Rick Schmidt and fiancée Rebecca Foulke. In 2007 Silent Majority Group entered into an exclusive promotion and distribution deal with Warner Music Group's Independent Label Group, being distributed by ADA. Hanson negotiated a deal for Silent Majority Group to be distributed by ADA Global, a Warner Music Group company.Silent Majority Group's first signing there was Framing Hanley who received a Platinum certification for their single "Lollipop". All three of Hanson's Silent Majority Group signings under the Warner Music Group deal, Tantric, Candlebox, and Framing Hanley went on to have great commercial success.

In 2012 Hanson and Paramore EP producer Peter Thornton opened "Plush" studios in Orlando, where he recruited, recorded and developed future multi-platinum artist Chris Daughtry. Chris went on to appear on American Idol, where he placed 4th and went on to sign with RCA / 19 Records. Later that year Hanson signed active rock artist Farewell 2 Fear, and rock/pop solo artist Blacklite District to the SMG label and the JHMP management company. Both reached number one status on Sirius / XM's "Octane" Channel, Blacklite District with "Take me to the grave","With me now" and Farewell 2 Fear with "Fire". Farewell 2 Fear gained popularity when their cover version of Rihanna's "Diamonds" was featured on the Howard Stern show. Blacklite District has gone on to stream over a billion streams of different tracks mainly from their multiple associations with Asian Anime YouTube pages. JHMP then signed platinum-selling rock band, Saving Abel, and also helped the act to form their own label Tennessippi Whiskey Records. He next signed the Scranton, PA artist Death Valley Dreams. The first single "Words Like Fire"appeared on 25 major market alternative stations. The album "Lust In The Modern World" was selected to appear in numerous playlists on Apple Music and Spotify platforms and was listed as one of the top Rock / Alternative albums of 2016 by Apple Music.

In March 2016 while appearing at the Florida Music Festival as a panelist, Hanson found out that he had been diagnosed with "Stage 4/B" metastatic tonsil cancer that spread to numerous locations and lymph nodes. He spent the remainder of 2016 having radiation, chemotherapy and multiple surgeries to remove the cancer and lymph nodes and was forced to take an indefinite leave of absence. Shortly after his cancer battle, Hanson, while pondering his future, received from an old friend, Trevor Fletcher, who manages Criteria Studios in Miami, a demo from 17-year-old Nashville alternative/pop artist and producer Brother Sundance. Hanson fell in love with the demos and due to his post cancer limitations recruited industry veteran and former Mc Gathy Promotions EVP and Island Def Jam rock promo head Mark Fisher to assist Rebecca Hanson in the management and promotion of the artist and Brother Sundance released his debut EP 'Honey', on August 11, 2017, through Silent Majority Group. Within two months of the signing of Brother Sundance the artist was named Apple Music's "New Artist of the Week". In June 2018 Silent Majority Group LLC entered into a partnership with Warner Brothers Records to re-release the "Honey" EP and four subsequent records. The first single from the Warner Brother's partnership,"Monsters featuring Ella Boh" was released May 10, 2019. Numerous singles were to follow however Brother Sundance (aka Rylan Talerico) left the recording business to pursue technical opportunities related to the music business.

Silent Majority Group continued to be active, signing YouTube sensation Blacklite District who has accumulated nearly 1,000,000,000 total streams between Apple, Spotify and YouTube and Portland's Veio a hard rock / Prog / New Metal artists. In January 2022 SMG entered into a new promotion and distribution deal for Veio and future releases with OneRPM! In early Summer of 2022 JHMP continued to be active and signed Lotus Crush the new artist founder by Candlebox founder, writer, and guitar player Peter Klett. Lotus Crush also features "The Voice" runner up Terry McDermott from Scotland as their lead singer. 2023 saw JHMP / SMG expand with new services and the re-grouping and re-signing of Big Dismal. Since their re-emergence Big Dismal's "Rise Again" achieved #1 status at Christian Rock Radio and "Stay in the fight" was the number 1 Christian rock song of 2024.

In 2024, SMG refocused on playlisting services through a partnership with Mindful Music Promotion. Hanson's team made history by using AI tools to create a track that bypassed detection software, becoming the first AI-generated song to land on an editorial playlist of a major streaming platform.
