= Down and Out (Tantric song) =

Single by Tantric

from the album The End Begins
- Released: 2008
- Recorded: 2008
- Genre: Post-grunge, hard rock, alternative rock
- Length: 3:39
- Label: Silent Majority Group
- Songwriters: Hugo Ferreira, Erik Leonhardt, Kevin Miller, Joe Pessia & Marcus Ratzenboeck

Tantric singles chronology
"After We Go" (2004)	"Down and Out" (2008)	"The One" (2008)

"Down and Out" is a song written and recorded by the American rock band Tantric. The song was released in the first quarter of 2008 as the lead single from their third studio album titled The End Begins. This song made the first single the band released with their new label Silent Majority Group. The song appears on the soundtrack of the baseball video game Major League Baseball 2K10, and the game's cover star Evan Longoria has used the song as his entrance music during his career.

== Charts ==
Chart (2008)	Peak Position
US Alternative Airplay (Billboard)	34
US Mainstream Rock (Billboard)	8
