= Mercury Retrograde (Tantric album) =

Studio album by Tantric
- Released: October 5, 2018
- Recorded: 2015–2018
- Studio: Blue Room
- Genre: Post-grunge
- Label: Pavement
- Producer: Chuck Alkazian

Tantric chronology
Blue Room Archives (2014)	Mercury Retrograde (2018)	The Sum of All Things (2021)

Singles from Mercury Retrograde
- 1. "Letting Go" Released: July 26, 2018; 2. "Against My Forever" Released: November 6, 2018; 3. "Angry" Released: February 6, 2019

Mercury Retrograde is the seventh studio album by American rock band Tantric, released on October 5, 2018. The lead single, "Letting Go", was released on July 26, 2018.

== Background and recording ==
Starting in the spring of 2015 the group revealed they were already recording new music to follow up 2014's Blue Room Archives.

During the summer of 2015 and throughout 2016 the band released unreleased songs on their Reverbnation page titled "I Can't Feel", "Fool" and "Nowhere" these tracks were later revealed by lead vocalist Hugo Ferreira that they were just experiments to test new sounds and go back to an older style Tantric sound and see how the fans reacted.

After the departure of Derek Issacs in the summer of 2015, Tantric went through numerous lineup changes once again and eventually all the members from the new Tantric era had departed, the lineup consistently changed heavily from summer 2015 to summer 2017.

On May 3, 2016, lead vocalist Hugo Ferreira shared audio clips of new music on his social media accounts. He also announced that the album at that time would be titled "Tether".

On November 5, 2017, the band also released another new song via their social media accounts titled "Against My Forever", the track was said to be the first single off the new album but was never promoted and officially released. It later appears on Mercury Retrograde with the new title "My Forever".

During a May 11, 2018 interview announcing their tour with Puddle of Mudd, vocalist Hugo Ferreira said he was putting finishing touches on the new Tantric album and should hear an announcement in the coming weeks.

== Release ==
In early July 2018 the band's record label Pavement Entertainment started taking out ads in magazines and started promoting the release of the new Tantric album titled Mercury Retrograde.

The album's lead single titled "Letting Go" was released to radio on July 26, 2018, the song is currently airing on Sirus Octane, the lead single has been noticed by longtime fans as an unreleased but re-recorded track from the unreleased Tantric album Tantric III from 2007.

== Track listing ==
No.	Title	Length
1.	"Angry"	2:55
2.	"Tether"	3:30
3.	"Get 'Em All"	2:53
4.	"Before You Could Crawl"	3:49
5.	"Lie Awake"	3:39
6.	"Against My Forever"	4:00
7.	"Wannabe"	3:53
8.	"The Last Stumble"	3:45
9.	"Letting Go"	2:59
10.	"Against My Forever (Acoustic Mix)"	3:56
