= Mind Control (song) =

Single by Tantric

from the album Mind Control
- Released: June 16, 2009
- Recorded: March 2009
- Genre: Alternative rock; post-grunge; alternative metal; hard rock; folk rock
- Length: 3:01
- Label: Silent Majority
- Songwriters: Hugo Ferreira; Erik Leonhardt; Kevin Miller; Joe Pessia; Marcus Ratzenboeck
- Producers: Brett Hestla; Hugo Ferreira

Tantric singles chronology
| "Fall Down" (2008) | "Mind Control" (2009) | "Coming Undone" (2009) |

Music video
- "Mind Control" on YouTube

"Mind Control" is a song written and recorded by the American rock band Tantric. The song was released June 16, 2009, as the lead single from their fourth studio album of the same name (Mind Control).

== Charts ==
| Chart (2001) | Peak position |
|---|---|
| US Mainstream Rock (Billboard) | 22 |
