= 37 Channels =

Studio album by Tantric
- Released: September 17, 2013
- Recorded: 2013
- Genres: Post-grunge; alternative rock
- Length: 49:31
- Label: Pavement
- Producers: Hugo Ferreira; Malcolm Springer

Tantric chronology
Mind Control (2009)	37 Channels (2013)	Blue Room Archives (2014)

Singles from 37 Channels
- 1. "Mosquita" Released: August 13, 2013; 2. "You Got What You Wanted" Released: 2014

37 Channels is the fifth studio album by American rock band Tantric, released on September 17, 2013, via Pavement Entertainment.

== Background and recording ==
On August 8, 2013, via Pavement Entertainment, it was announced that Tantric would be releasing their fifth studio album titled 37 Channels on September 17, 2013.

Lead singer Hugo Ferreira remained the only sole member of the band during the album's recording.

Ferreira commented on the album saying:"I didn't let people jerk off all over this record, I'm very protective of it. I used to let things go, but I literally oversaw every aspect of 37 Channels." Ferreira also explained the songwriting of the album saying:"I can't afford a therapist, so this is what I do. I regurgitate all my angst and pain and confusion and joy. I'm showing more, letting people into my brain and heart."

Soon after the release of the album in the fall of 2013 Hugo recruited drummer TJ Taylor, bassist Scott Wilson and guitarist Derek Isaacs and went on to tour in support of the album.

== Track listing ==
All tracks are written by Hugo Ferreira, except where noted.

No.	Title	Writer(s)	Length
1.	"Again"		3:21
2.	"Blue Room"		2:58
3.	"Mosquita" (featuring Shooter Jennings)	Ferreira; David Mouser	3:51
4.	"Gravity"		4:11
5.	"Loss for Words"		5:19
6.	"Where Do We Go from Here?"		3:12
7.	"Rise"		3:28
8.	"Broken"		5:08
9.	"You Got What You Wanted"		3:45
10.	"Fault" (featuring Austin John Winkler)	Ferreira; Winkler	4:58
11.	"My Turn"		4:02
12.	"Bullet" (featuring Austin John Winkler)	Ferreira; Winkler	3:17
13.	"Girl in White"		4:01
Total length:			49:31

== Personnel ==
Musicians

- Hugo Ferreira – lead vocals, second guitar, bass guitar, piano
- Austin John Winkler – guest vocals
- Shooter Jennings – guest vocals
- Leif Garrett – guest vocals
- David "2B" Mouser – guest vocals
- Kenny Olsen – lead guitar
- Kevin McCreery – lead guitar
- Scott Bartlett – second guitar
- Johnny K – second guitar
- Kevin McCreery – rhythm guitar
- Gary Morse – pedal steel guitar
- Greg Upchurch – drums
- Emanuel Cole – drums
- John Abel – bass guitar

Technical personnel

- Hugo Ferreira – producer (1–12), engineer (1–12), mixing (3, 13), mastering (3)
- James Thomas – engineer (1–12), mixing (1–12), mastering
- Anthony Focx – mixing (3), mastering (3)
- Malcolm Springer – producer (13)
- Matthew Ryan – engineer (13)

== Charts ==
The album debuted at number 24 on the Billboard Hard Rock Albums chart in the US.

Chart (2013)	Peak position
US Hard Rock Albums (Billboard)	24
