= The End Begins =

Studio album by Tantric
- Released: April 22, 2008
- Recorded: September 2007
- Studios: The Blue Room (Kentucky); Soundmine Recording Studios (Pennsylvania); Skip Saylor Recording (California)
- Genres: Post-grunge; alternative rock
- Length: 44:30
- Label: Silent Majority
- Producer: Toby Wright

Tantric chronology
After We Go (2004)	The End Begins (2008)	Mind Control (2009)

Singles from The End Begins
- 1. "Down and Out" Released: February 19, 2008; 2. "The One" Released: April 8, 2008; 3. "Fall Down" Released: November 8, 2008

Professional ratings
Review scores
Source	Rating
Pop Matters	4/10
Under the Gun Review	6.5/10

The End Begins is the third studio album by American rock band Tantric. It is the first one recorded without the band's original members Todd Whitener, Matt Taul, and Jesse Vest. Vocalist Hugo Ferreira, the only remaining original member, was forced to scrap the original line-up's completed third album in favor of The End Begins, an effort established by new members of the band in addition to Ferreira. This is the only studio album to feature former Fuel drummer Kevin Miller.

== Background ==
Left without a band, Hugo Ferreira scrapped the entire record. He began writing new material at his own studio before enlisting members of his side project, State of the Art, to record and tour as Tantric. These include ex-Fuel drummer Kevin Miller, ex-DramaGods bassist Joe Pessia on guitar, Fosterchild bassist Erik Leonhardt, and Marcus Ratzenboeck on electric violin, adding another dimension to the band. Ratzenboeck's brother Derek, a classical concert violinist, would composed the intro violin riff to the song "Down & Out".

With returning producer Toby Wright, the new line-up finished recording within 30 days in September 2007.

The End Begins was released on April 22, 2008, and debuted at number 91 on the Billboard 200. As of July 11, 2008, it has sold over 10,000 copies, with the lead single, "Down & Out" at number 8 on the Billboard Mainstream Rock Chart. The song's popularity led it to become Tampa Bay Rays slugger Evan Longoria's walk-up theme.

In regards to the album title, Hugo Ferreira cited the process up to its inception and stated, "the end of one thing led to the beginning of another." He also noted that the majority of songs revolve around either the band itself or a troubled personal relationship he endured during the writing process. Ferreira described the album's lyrical themes in a November 2008 interview:

"This record is all about the strife and challenges of getting back on my feet after the second Tantric record, After We Go, not only on a professional sense but a personal one as well. It deals with personal and emotional growth, and learning from the blows the industry and life gives you."

The only version of the physical End Begins album is a partially censored edition; the tracks "The One" and "Monopoly" are muted of explicit lyrics and listed as "Clean" when played on a PC. "Love Song", however, frequently uses the word "shit" uncensored during its chorus. It appears that the only way of obtaining the two aforementioned songs uncensored is by purchasing them as MP3s via iTunes or Amazon.com or obtaining them through the band's manager.

On January 13, 2009, The End Begins was re-released as a "Digital Deluxe" edition. This includes the bonus tracks "Down & Out" (Acoustic) and "Fall Down." As of May 2009, the album has sold well over 70,000 copies.

Based on crowd response to the song "Fall Down", which was originally planned for Tantric III, the band rerecorded it without the Nappy Roots feature as their second single for a November 4, 2008 radio and iTunes release. The version of the song featuring Nappy Roots can only be found on YouTube because lead singer Hugo Ferreira leaked the song out to fans for appreciation. With this, they also announced a re-release of The End Begins including the said song as a bonus track. The "Digital Deluxe" edition, available January 13, 2009, also features an acoustic version of "Down & Out" but is evidently only available in download form.

== Track listing ==
All tracks are written by Tantric.

No.	Title	Length
1.	"Regret"	4:13
2.	"Down and Out"	3:39
3.	"The One" (feat. Kevin Martin of Candlebox)	4:08
4.	"Love Song"	4:03
5.	"Wishing"	4:50
6.	"Something Better"	4:01
7.	"Lucky One"	3:28
8.	"The End Begins"	4:11
9.	"Monopoly"	3:51
10.	"Why Don't You"	3:42
11.	"Lay"	4:19

Digital deluxe bonus tracks
No.	Title	Length
12.	"Down & Out" (Acoustic)	3:36
13.	"Fall Down"	3:37

== Personnel ==
Tantric

- Hugo Ferreira – lead vocals
- Kevin Miller – drums, percussion, keyboards, vocals
- Joe Pessia – electric and acoustic guitar, mandolin
- Erik Leonhardt – bass, vocals
- Marcus Ratzenboeck – electric violin

Additional personnel

- Kevin Martin – vocals on "The One"
- Toby Wright – producer, engineer, mixing
- James Musshorn – mix assistant
- Carlos Ferreira/Sketchtank – graphic design, packaging photography
