= TJ Taylor =

American drummer

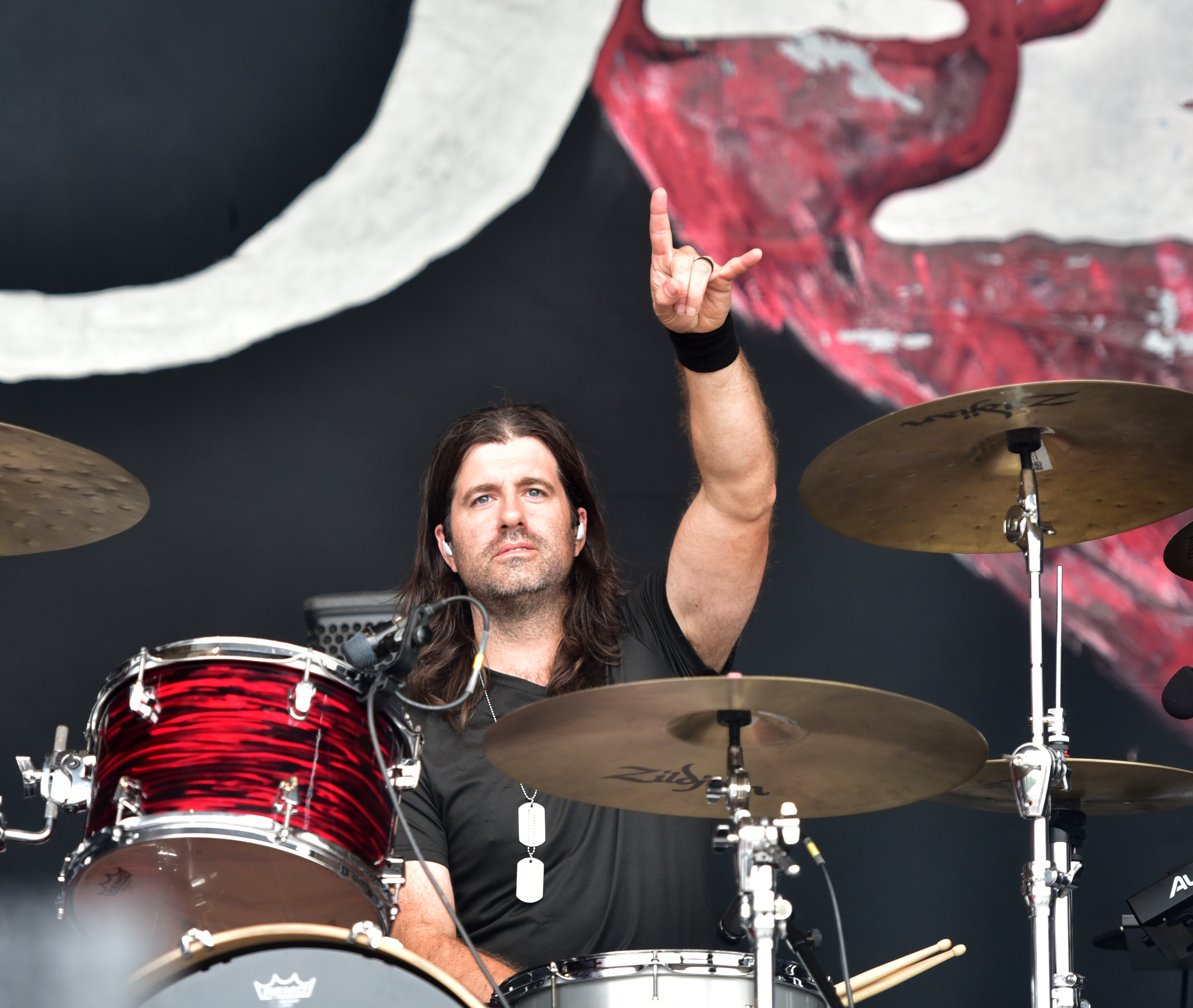

Background information
- Birth name: Timothy Lewis Taylor Jr.
- Born: August 8, 1985 (age 40) Frankfort, Kentucky, U.S.
- Genres: Alternative metal, hard rock, nu metal, country
- Instrument: Drums
- Website: tjtaylordrums.com

Timothy Lewis Taylor Jr. (born August 8, 1985) is an American musician. He is the drummer of the hard rock band SOiL. He is the former drummer of the rock band Tantric.

== Biography ==
Taylor was raised on a 100-acre farm outside of Frankfort, Kentucky. His interest in the drums began at a young age, after being given a drum kit by a neighbor. Taylor spent many time playing records like Led Zeppelin's Coda, Foreigner's 4, Rush's Hemispheres, Van Halen's 5150 or Soundgarden's Superunknown. Taylor, being left-handed, played open handed, on a right-handed positioned drum kit, and reversing his ride and first rack tom. In high school, Taylor (although under age) would sneak through the back door of a local bar to perform in the house band every Thursday night. Performing covers, as well as original material on a band called Blind Addiction. Taylor was a finalist in the Guitar Center drum off competition, as well as settling into touring gigs with former EMI singer songwriter Buffy Lawson (formerly of Bomshel), as well as Atlanta-based nu metal group Dangerous New Machine (featuring Eric Rogers of Stereomud and Billy Grey of Fozzy).

Taylor toured and recorded with Tantric from 2012 to 2015 replacing drummer Ritchie Monica. Taylor was made a full-time member of the band in 2013. He recorded and toured in support of records "37 Channels" (Pavement Records), and "Blue Room Archives" (Pavement Records). He left the band in 2015.

In September 2018 TJ began drumming for the metal band SOiL. TJ recorded drums on the record "Play it forward", released on Cleopatra Records in 2022.
