= Mind Control (Tantric album) =

Studio album by Tantric
- Released: August 4, 2009
- Recorded: March 2009
- Genre: Post-grunge; alternative rock
- Length: 35:32
- Label: Silent Majority
- Producer: Brett Hestla; Hugo Ferreira

Tantric chronology
The End Begins (2008)	Mind Control (2009)	37 Channels (2013)

Singles from Mind Control
- 1. "Mind Control" Released: June 15, 2009; 2. "Coming Undone" Released: October 20, 2009

Mind Control is the fourth album by American rock band Tantric, released on August 4, 2009. It is the band's second album under Silent Majority Group and was produced by Brett Hestla, marking Tantric's departure from mainstay producer Toby Wright. Mind Control retains the band's 2008 lineup with the exception of drummer Kevin Miller who was replaced by Richie Monica.

== Background and recording ==
On March 9, 2009 via MySpace, Tantric announced that they were recording a new album entitled Mind Control. The band's fourth album would be produced by Brett Hestla, former touring bassist for Creed, and initially given a July 21 release date.

Singer Hugo Ferreira noted that Mind Control was more collaborative than previous releases and called it "really, really heavy for Tantric, twice as heavy as the last record at least." However, as all Tantric band members live in different cities across the United States, Mind Control was written piecemeal. The band would send each other compositions via email for others to build on. In an interview with The Flint Journal, Hugo Ferreira discussed the album's production:

"It was all like via e-mail. Basically Joe would send me a guitar riff on the e-mail and I would dump it into my home studio and kind of slice it up and put it together, and maybe add a chorus. It was put together like a puzzle. But with the instrumentation, I think that the guys, in my mind, really stepped up to the plate and gave me a lot of great stuff to work with. I never really wrote a record like this. But, to me, I think it's the best one we've ever done. It was crazy because it was really effortless. It's great."

Ferreira also elaborated on performing for the US military in Korea and the meaning behind Mind Control and its title track:

"This record is a lot darker than anything we have ever done. Basically, I wrote the song about the media kind of controlling people's opinions and thoughts and stuff like that. Just from being on the side of the viewer of me watching television and seeing the news and flying out to Korea and talking with troops out there and getting their take on it and being completely different. That's what the song was about. The song, even musically, and with the video we already shot, it sets up the whole tone of the record. I thought it would be a cool name."

Within a few months of sharing and developing songs separately, the bandmates had written nearly thirty songs. They finally reconvened for one week in a secluded studio in Poconos to perform the songs together and refine them. Bassist Erik Leonhardt explained how the album developed further with the band together:

"We had written the whole record over the computer, so a lot of it changed once we got into the studio. When you have everyone in the same room the ideas start changing. 'What if we do this? What if we do that?' We definitely went heavier on this record, too. I think it has a lot to do with having all new members. This is the new band, full on and writing together. We never said 'let's write a heavier record,' this is just what happened."

With Mind Control having been released merely a year after Tantric's prior album, Ferreira justified the hastiness by explaining "We had the material written. We didn't want to be off the radar. We were off the radar from 2004-2008 and we didn't want people to have to wait for us. It's already not a very loyal business, so if you're not constantly at it you can be easily forgotten."

== Promotion and tour ==
The album's title track served as its lead single, being introduced to radio in August. After two weeks, it entered the Top 40 on the Mediabase Active Rock chart. The music video for "Mind Control" was shot in Nashville with director Mason Dixon, who previously directed "Down and Out". It debuted nationwide via MTV2's Unleashed on August 4.

Tantric's first tour for Mind Control was scheduled from August to September 2009 with guests Aranda and Vayden.

== Critical reception ==
Professional ratings
Review scores
Source	Rating
AllMusic	3.5/5 stars
Guitar Edge	3.5/5 stars
Live-Metal.net	7/10 stars
The Tune	(D+)
Type 3 Media	7/10 stars

Mind Control gained largely positive feedback from critics. Michael Mueller of Guitar Edge gave the album 3.5 out of 5 stars. Praising guitarist Joe Pessia's acoustic performances on "The Past Is the Past" and "What are You Waiting For", he declared that one of the two "is almost certain to be a radio smash." Mueller also considered the song "Let's Start" "Rob Zombie meets Alice in Chains with an E-Bow. However, there is no E-BOW used on the album. Tantric has an actual violin player in the band. "

== Track listing ==
All tracks are written by Tantric.

No.	Title	Length
1.	"Mind Control"	3:01
2.	"Fall to the Ground"	3:20
3.	"Coming Undone"	2:56
4.	"Desert Me"	2:47
5.	"The Past Is the Past"	3:24
6.	"Kick Back"	3:06
7.	"Intermezzo"	1:26
8.	"Run Out"	2:59
9.	"Walk Away"	2:57
10.	"What Are You Waiting For"	3:20
11.	"Let's Start"	3:03
12.	"Guiding Me"	3:06

iTunes bonus tracks
No.	Title	Length
13.	"Kick Back" (Obama Mix)	3:08
14.	"Desert Me" (Acoustic)	2:42

== Personnel ==
Tantric

- Hugo Ferreira – lead vocals
- Joe Pessia – guitar
- Erik Leonhardt – bass, vocals
- Marcus Ratzenboeck – violin
- Richie Monica – drums

Technical personnel

- Brett Hestla – producer
- Tantric – producer
- Dan Malsch – engineer, mixing
- Mike Fuller – mastering
