= Blue Room Archives =

Studio album by Tantric
- Released: September 30, 2014
- Recorded: 2001–2014
- Studio: Blue Room
- Genre: Post-grunge
- Length: 42:45
- Label: Pavement
- Producer: Hugo Ferreira

Tantric chronology
37 Channels (2013)	Blue Room Archives (2014)	Mercury Retrograde (2018)

Singles from Blue Room Archives
- 1. "Cynical" Released: August 28, 2014; 2. "Mourning After" Released: January 22, 2015

Blue Room Archives is the sixth studio album by American rock band Tantric. It was released on September 30, 2014, via Pavement Records.

== Background ==
The band announced on their official Facebook page on August 1, 2014, that they would be releasing a new studio album of previously unreleased material throughout the band's career including newly recorded acoustic versions of their early hits "Breakdown" and "Mourning" along with two new remixes of their later hits "Mind Control" and "Fall to the Ground".

On August 28, 2014, Ferreira revealed in an interview with Music Junkie Press the title of the album originated from the name of his personal home studio that he named the "Blue Room" which was where much of the album's production work and song writing has been done at various different times throughout his career.

Lead singer Hugo Ferreira commented on the album saying: "This isn't so much a premeditated album, but a collection of music I have done that I always loved extremely but never found a place for. It's songs in their purest form, no flashy production or elaborate theme. Imagine it as a mix tape of songs I wrote or co-wrote that stand alone uniquely. A inside view of the other side of a tantric state of mind."

== Promotion ==
To help promote the album, the band offered pre-orders of hand-signed copies of the album by lead vocalist Hugo Ferreira for $20.00.

== Track listing ==
The track list for the album was revealed on August 1, 2014, along with the announcement of the album.

Blue Room Archives
No.	Title	Length
1.	"Cynical (feat. Brett Hestla)"	3:23
2.	"Breakdown (Acoustic)"	3:18
3.	"Abuse Me"	3:48
4.	"Don't Let It Win"	2:57
5.	"Fall to the Ground (remix)"	3:15
6.	"Mind Control (remix)"	3:34
7.	"Mourning (Acoustic)"	5:30
8.	"Nothing at All"	4:09
9.	"Mourning After"	4:40
10.	"Indiscretion"	4:22
11.	"Flip a Coin"	3:45
Total length:		42:45
