= Tantric (band) =

American rock band

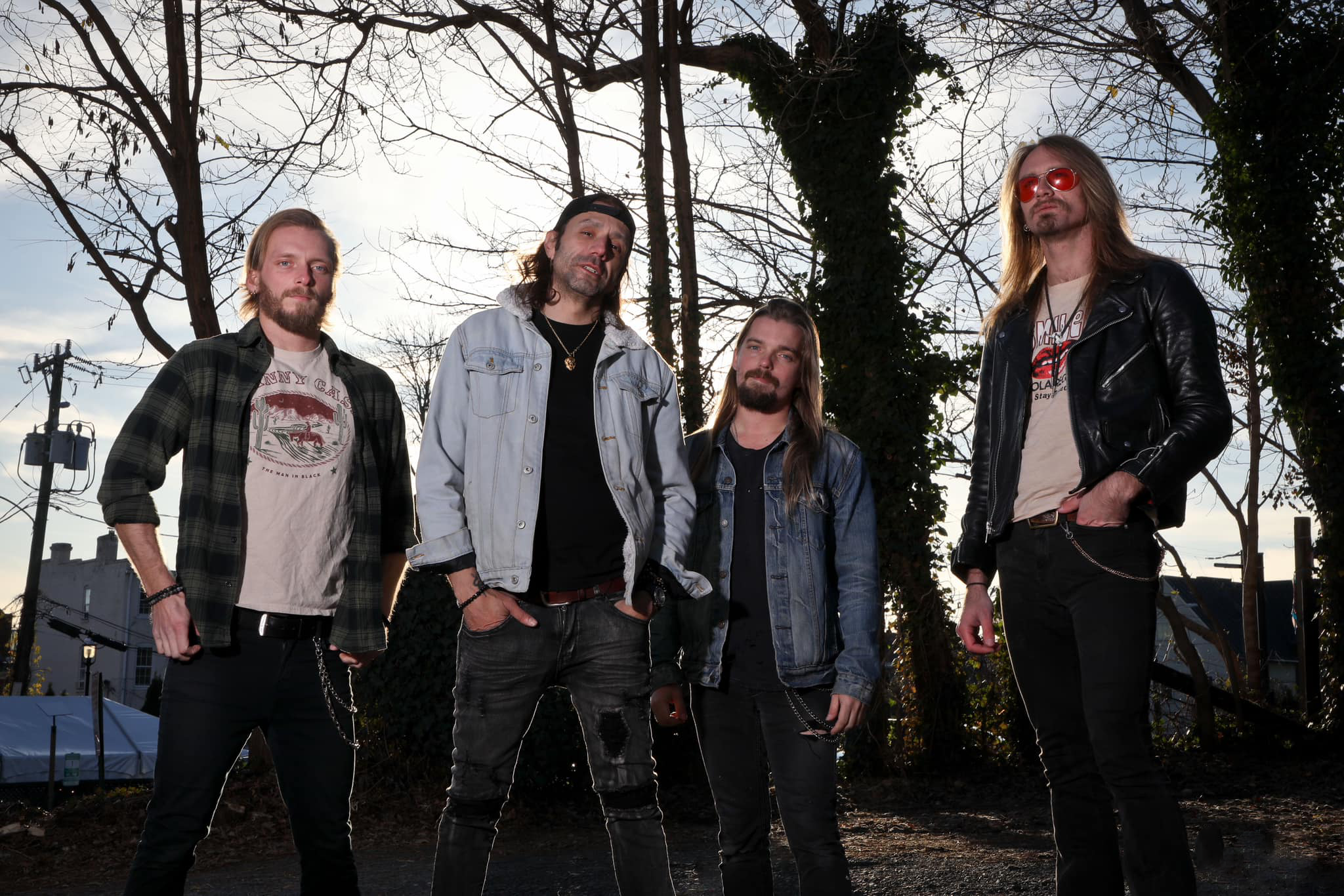
- Tantric in 2025

Background information
- Also known as: C-14
- Origin: Louisville, Kentucky, U.S.
- Genres: Post-grunge; alternative rock
- Years active: 1999–present
- Labels: Maverick; Silent Majority Group; Pavement Entertainment; Cleopatra
- Spinoff of: Days of the New
- Members: Hugo Ferreira; Jarad Carney; Breezy Bree; Wendall Eubanks; Devon Digiacomo
- Past members: See members section
- Website: tantricofficial.com

Tantric is an American rock band from Louisville, Kentucky. The group was founded in 1998 by Todd Whitener, Jesse Vest and Matt Taul after they left Days of the New, and joined forces with vocalist Hugo Ferreira. Ferreira is the only remaining member of the band from the original lineup.

The band's eighth full-length album, The Sum of All Things, was released in 2021 via Cleopatra Records.

== History ==
=== Formation ===
In November 1998, guitarist Todd Whitener, bassist Jesse Vest, and drummer Matt Taul all quit Days of the New after creative and personal disagreements with singer Travis Meeks. They contacted singer Hugo Ferreira (formerly of the band Merge) in early 1999 to see if he would be interested in starting a new project together. The former Days of the New members had previously met Ferreira during a tour and admired his distinct baritone voice. By March that year, the four had their first practice together upon Ferreira's move to Nashville. The band started under the name C-14 but soon changed their name to Tantric. With the help of friends in Louisville radio, the band quickly gained local exposure.

During an interview Ferreira commented on the band's formation, saying: "We were managed by the same company at one point when I was in a band called Merge and they were in Days of the New. We were familiar with each other and had even done some touring together. I needed a change, and they just got kicked out of their gig with Days of the New and needed a new gig as well. I came down and sang with them, and it was real natural. Everybody got along really well, so we were like, 'Hey, we should probably call this something.' We called it C-14, which was the original name of the band. After that we decided to come up with a better name."

=== Tantric (2000–2003) ===
By late 2000, Tantric's demo caught the attention of Maverick Records who signed them that same year. The band quickly began recording their self-titled debut with producer Toby Wright in Nashville. The album was released on February 13, 2001, it spawned three singles "Breakdown", "Astounded" and "Mourning".

The album debuted at No. 193 on the Billboard 200 chart and eventually peaked at No. 71. It was officially certified gold by the RIAA on November 30, 2001. By mid-2002 the album had sold over 600,000 copies. The band went on a headlining tour in early 2001, then went on tour with 3 Doors Down and Lifehouse from April to August of the same year to support the album. The band also toured with Kid Rock and Creed to support the album as well. The album is Tantric's most successful album to date. In February 2002, a track from the album titled 'Revillusion' was featured as the theme song for the WWA Revolution event.

In June 2002, the band contributed the song "Cross the Line" for the NASCAR: Crank It Up compilation album.

=== After We Go (2003–2005) ===
Toby Wright returned as producer as the band faced increasing pressure to satisfy contract obligations to the label, and on December 9, 2003, Tantric released the first single "Hey Now" from their second studio album, After We Go ahead of its February 24, 2004 release. The album debuted at No. 56 on the Billboard 200 chart. Three singles were released from the album including the lead single "Hey Now", followed by "The Chain" and "After We Go". The album sold over 200,000 copies in its first year but failed to reach gold status.

Following settlement of a lawsuit filed by the label against the subsidiary's parent company that same year, After We Go would be Tantric's final release for Maverick Records.

=== Tantric III (2005–2007) ===
In 2005, bassist Jesse Vest left the group, wishing to spend more time with his family. He was replaced by Bruce LaFrance through mutual friend and touring band member Kevin McCreery. With Elliott Blakey in the producer's chair, Tantric worked on the follow-up to After We Go, tentatively titled Tantric III. Scheduled for a May 2006 release, the band created over a dozen songs for the album such as "People", "Worth Waiting For", "Stay with You", "Locked Out", and Whitener's lead singing performance, "July". Less than two months prior to the album's scheduled release, Tantric and Maverick Records parted ways in March 2006 as part of the label's ongoing efforts at financial reorganization since 2004.

On May 8, 2007, the release of three songs from Tantric III on the band's MySpace was largely overshadowed by Todd Whitener's farewell announcement on the band's website, citing feelings of artistic stagnation attributed to the band's struggle to maintain commercial success. Ferreira later said in interviews that Whitener, as well as other members of the band, had expressed frustration with the label, Maverick Records', ongoing legal and financial issues. Bruce LaFrance was working with Whitener on a side project, called Interchange and Ferreira's State of the Art side project which eventually became the new Tantric. LaFrance opted out of State of the Art staying on with Whitener. While the Tantric III album has not been officially released, portions of the album have reportedly been leaked via the YouTube platform.

=== The End Begins (2007–2008) ===
In late 2007 Hugo Ferreira began searching for new bandmates. He enlisted former Fuel drummer Kevin Miller, and DramaGods guitarist Joe Pessia. Erik Leonhardt became Tantric's bassist and electric violinist Marcus Ratzenboeck was recruited. Shortly thereafter, the band announced their deal with the independent label Silent Majority Group and their new management company JHMP.

The newly assembled second lineup of Tantric recorded ten new songs and a revamped version of "The One" featuring Kevin Martin of Candlebox. The End Begins was released as the band's third album on April 22, 2008, continuing the style of post-grunge. The lead single was "Down and Out". On January 13, 2009, the band released a digital deluxe edition with an acoustic version of "Down and Out" and a new version of "Fall Down".

=== Mind Control (2009–2013) ===
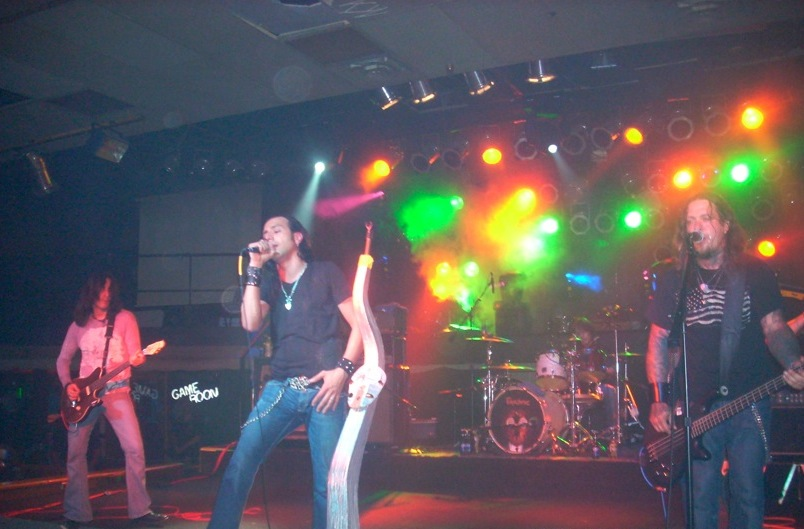
Tantric in 2009

After touring in support of The End Begins, drummer Kevin Miller departed and was replaced by Richie Monica. On March 9, 2009, Tantric announced the recording of their fourth album. Mind Control was released on August 4, 2009, and marked the dismissal of producer Toby Wright in favor of former touring Creed bassist Brett Hestla. Though spawning two singles "Mind Control" and "Coming Undone" the album lacked success and did not fare as well as their previous albums. "Coming Undone" peaked at number 31 on the US Mainstream Rock charts. Mind Control would be Tantric's last album on their label Silent Majority Group.

Tantric embarked on a Fall 2009 tour supporting Shinedown, which lasted September through November.

On November 23, 2010, lead singer Hugo Ferreira released a cover of the Christmas song "Carol of the Bells" digitally in the iTunes Store, making it the first and only time to date that Ferreira released music under his name and not Tantric's.

Tantric remained relatively quiet from the fall of 2010 throughout the first half of 2013, Ferreira announced in late 2010 that he had started gearing to start writing and recording for a new album. The lineup changed consistently throughout that timeframe, but Ferreira did recruit members to play with him to keep Tantric touring.

=== 37 Channels (2013–2014) ===
On July 17, 2013, record label Pavement Entertainment announced it had signed Tantric and would be releasing the band's fifth album, 37 Channels, on September 17. Ferreira, the only original member still in the band at the time of the record's recording and release, played rhythm guitar, bass and piano. The album was recorded with guitarists Kevin McCreery, Scott Bartlett, Johnny K., and Kenny Olson, bassist John Abel, drummer Emanuel Cole, and pedal steel guitarist Gary Morse.

Ferreira did almost all songwriting and production on the album, which took over three years to record. He later said he had to choose the album's 19 songs from 116 he'd written.

37 Channels received moderately positive reviews, debuting at No. 24 on Billboard's Hard Rock Albums chart. Soon after the release of the album, Ferreira recruited drummer TJ Taylor, bassist Scott Wilson, and guitarist Derek Isaacs as touring members; all three later became official members.

=== Blue Room Archives (2014–2015) ===
On August 1, 2014, the band announced on their official Facebook page that they would be releasing a new album called Blue Room Archives on September 30, 2014. The album will contain seven previously unreleased songs that was spanned throughout the band's career and newly recorded acoustic versions of their two biggest hits "Breakdown" and "Mourning" along with two new remixes of their previously released songs "Mind Control" and "Fall To The Ground" totaling 11 tracks all together. The album will be released via Pavement Entertainment. To help promote the album the band is offering pre-orders that are signed by front man Hugo Ferreira for US$20.00. The offer ended on September 1, 2014.

The band revealed the title of the album came from the band's home studio that they named "The Blue Room".

Lead vocalist and front man Hugo Ferreira comments: "This isn't so much a premeditated album, but a collection of music I have done that I always loved extremely but never found a place for. It's songs in their purest form, no flashy production or elaborate theme. Imagine it as a mix tape of songs I wrote or co-wrote that stand alone uniquely. An inside view of the other side of a tantric state of mind."

On August 28, 2014, the band released the first single off the album titled "Cynical" via SoundCloud.

Blue Room Archives was released on September 30, 2014, as planned, making it the release of their sixth studio album.

Tantric announced "The Blue Room Archives" tour shortly after the album's release, the band will be playing many shows headlining and supporting throughout late 2014 and 2015 in support of the album.

=== Studio sessions, lineup changes and Mercury Retrograde (2015–2020) ===
On April 29, 2015, Tantric posted on their official Facebook page that they "hoped" to be releasing a new album later this year in 2015, the album will be the band's seventh studio album and second album under the new Tantric era.

On June 2 and 3, 2015, Tantric posted two new songs on their ReverbNation page. The first song was titled "I Can't Feel" and the second song was titled "Fool".

On June 16, 2015, lead guitarist Derek Isaacs announced his departure from Tantric after a year and a half with the band.

Tantric released another new song titled "Nowhere" via ReverbNation on July 12, 2015. The song is a departure from the new Tantric sound they have had on their previous three studio albums and more of an original Tantric sound.

On July 28, 2015, Tantric announced via Facebook that Arizona-based guitarist Tommy Gibbons has joined the band to fill the lead guitarist role. Gibbons was introduced to Tantric by the band While-She-Waits.

On November 12, 2015, Tantric announced on Facebook that Mike Smith will be joining them on their up-and-coming tour as their drummer to replace TJ Taylor. According to Ferreira, Taylor left the band a few months before like Derek Isaacs. There is so far no confirmation if he will be a permanent member of the band.

Tantric announced their "Views from Above" tour on March 24, 2016. The tour started on May 6 and ran all summer.

Lead vocalist Hugo Ferreira shared a ten-second audio clip of songs from the new album via his Facebook page on May 3, 2016. In the video it was also announced that the new album would be called Teather

On May 17, 2016, the band announced that they will be taking part in the Make America Rock Again tour throughout in mid to late 2016.

On September 9, 2016, the band announced that it had parted ways with guitarist, Tommy Gibbons. The band in the middle of the Make America Rock Again tour decided to ask Ty Fury from the band Trapt to fill in.

On June 3, 2017, Scott Wilson announced on his official Facebook that he left Tantric to join the band Saving Abel. Also appears that Ty Fury is a permanent member of the band now.

On November 5, 2017, the band released a song from their upcoming record via the band's official Facebook page titled "Against My Forever".

During a May 2018 interview, lead vocalist Hugo Ferreira announced that Tantric would be joining Puddle of Mudd on their 2018 Resurrection tour, and also that Tantric was putting finishing touches on the new album now being titled Mercury Retrograde.

The band's record label Pavement Entertainment started taking out ads in Billboard magazine promoting the new Tantric record in July 2018. The album was released on October 5, 2018.

=== The Sum of All Things (2021–present) ===
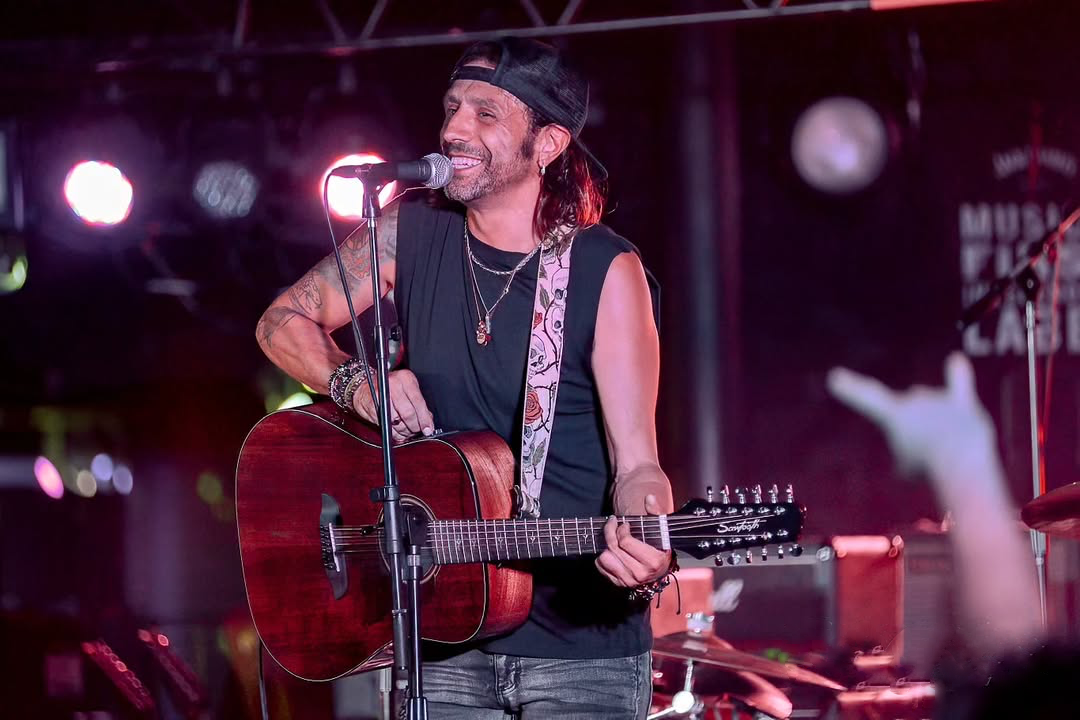
Hugo Ferreira with Tantric in 2024

"Living Here Without You" was released on June 23, 2021, as a single off the band's eighth studio album The Sum of All Things which was released July 23, 2021, via Cleopatra Records.

On January 27, 2024, it was announced Tantric would be featured on the new single "Wicked Game" by the instrumental rock band MDMP with Ferreira providing lead vocals for the track.

== Musical style ==
Tantric is often categorized as post-grunge and is known for its emphasis on acoustic guitar, distorted electric guitar, and multi-layered vocal harmonies. However, due to their heaviness, the band also fit in well during the early 2000s peak of alternative and nu metal. In their early career, Tantric was frequently compared to Days of the New, from which its original guitarist, bassist, and drummer derived. However, the group also gained strong comparison—and in some cases, criticism—to grunge forerunners Alice in Chains. This is by no means coincidence; famed record producer Toby Wright, who handled Tantric's first three albums, also produced two Alice in Chains albums as well as the solo debut of their principal songwriter, Jerry Cantrell. Wright is known for emphasizing multi-tracked quartal and quintal vocal harmonies and other characteristics demonstrated in both bands.

However, since the departure of all but Tantric's vocalist from the original lineup, as well as the inclusion of electric violinist Marcus Ratzenboeck, the band's musical approach has evolved. Songs predating Ratzenboeck's inclusion in Tantric have since been performed live with violin, and the altered backing band has provided a shift in musical direction.

== Band members ==
Current members

- Hugo Ferreira – lead vocals, acoustic guitar, keyboards (1999–present)
- Devon Digiacomo - guitar, backing vocals (2025–present)
- Jarad Carney – guitar, backing vocals (2025–present)
- Breezy Bree – bass (2025–present)
- Wendall Eubanks - drums (2025–present)

Former members

- Jesse Vest – bass (1998–2005)
- Todd Whitener – lead guitar, backing vocals (1998–2007)
- Matt Taul – drums (1998–2007)
- Jeff Bartoszewicz – backing vocals, percussion (2002–2005)
- Bruce LaFrance – bass (2005–2007)
- Kevin Miller – drums (2007–2009)
- Joe Pessia – lead guitar (2007–2012)
- Erik Leonhardt – bass, backing vocals (2007–2012)
- Richie Monica – drums (2009–2012)
- Marcus Ratzenboeck – electric violin (2007–2013)
- Derek Isaac – lead guitar, backing vocals (2014–2015)
- TJ Taylor – drums (2014–2015)
- Tommy Gibbons – lead guitar, backing vocals (2015–2016)
- Scott Wilson – bass, backing vocals (2014–2017); lead guitar (2013)
- Ty Fury – lead guitar, backing vocals (2016–2017)
- Mike Smith – drums (2015–2017)
- Troy Patrick Farrell – drums (2017–2019, guest 2025)
- Ian Corabi – drums (2019–2020)
- Sebastian LaBar – lead guitar, backing vocals (2017–2023, guest 2025)
- Jaron Gulino – bass, backing vocals (2017–2023, guest 2025)
- Michael Newman – acoustic guitar, rhythm guitar (2024–2025)
- Chris Loree – lead guitar, backing vocals (2023–2025)
- Jon Loree – drums (2020–2025)
- Eric Warner – bass, backing vocals (2023–2025)

Former session and touring members

- Kevin McCreery – lead guitar (2013)
- Johnny K. – lead guitar (2013)
- Kenny Olson – lead guitar (2013)
- John Able – bass (2013)
- Emanuel Cole – drums (2013)
- Gary Morse – pedal steel guitar (2013)
- Rick Reynolds – bass, backing vocals (2023)
- Cadence Hinnant – drums (2024–2025)
- Rob Benton – acoustic guitar, backing vocals (2025)

== Discography ==
- Tantric (2001)
- After We Go (2004)
- The End Begins (2008)
- Mind Control (2009)
- 37 Channels (2013)
- Blue Room Archives (2014)
- Mercury Retrograde (2018)
- The Sum of All Things (2021)

== See also ==
- Live in the X Lounge - a charity album to which Tantric contributed live performances.
