= Hugo Ferreira =

American rock musician

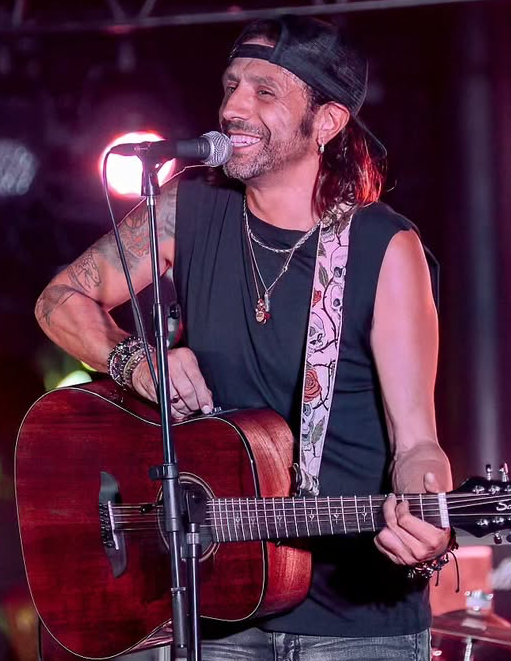
- Ferreira performing with Tantric in 2024

Background information
- Born: Hugo Fernando da Silva Ferreira; March 7, 1974 (age 52); Luanda, Portuguese Angola
- Origin: Hudson, Massachusetts, U.S.
- Genres: Alternative metal; post-grunge; hard rock; nu metal
- Occupations: Singer; musician; songwriter
- Instruments: Vocals; guitar
- Years active: 1994–present
- Member of: Tantric
- Formerly of: Merge

Hugo Fernando da Silva Ferreira (born March 7, 1974) is an American musician, best known as the lead singer of the rock band Tantric.

== Early years, Merge and formation of Tantric ==
Ferreira was born on March 7, 1974, in Luanda, Angola, which at the time was a Portuguese colony, to Portuguese colonial settlers. After the independence of Angola in 1975, his family moved to Hudson, Massachusetts, in the United States. Hugo began playing the piano at around age five. According to his biography, he began thinking about writing and composing music at 14 years of age.

Before becoming a more mainstream artist, Ferreira was a member of wedding bands, dance music groups, "off-tune" rock groups, and Portuguese folklore groups. After graduating from Hudson High School in 1992, he moved to Detroit, Michigan, where he started the band Merge with Paul Hemsworth. In the course of the next four years, the band self-released a record and a six-song tape.

=== Formation of Tantric ===
After being "fired" from Days of the New in November 1998 guitarist Todd Whitener, bassist Jesse Vest and drummer Matt Taul began searching for a vocalist for a new band. Ferreira, being somewhat friends with the former members of Days of the New after touring with them while in his band Merge seemed to make sense for him to audition for the band Whitener, Vest and Taul were forming. Ferreira auditioned and got accepted into the band in March 1999.

Soon after being accepted into the band Ferreira moved to Louisville, Kentucky, to record demos with his new bandmates under the moniker Carbon 14 (C-14). They later realized that bands with numbers in their names were played out and changed the band name to Tantric after Buddhist sexual practices.

Ferreira commented on his change of bands saying his reason for joining was he felt he needed a change. He also said "the bass player was working at Hooters cooking wings, the guitarist was picking up what he could, and you don't want to know what the drummer was doing," Ferreira said with a laugh.

"We were beyond broke," he continued. "All I had was a TV and a VCR, and I sold them to pay for the U-Haul to move to Louisville. I was tending bar at some cheesy beach club and winning karaoke contests singing Frank Sinatra songs competing against toothless drunks with names like Billy Bob Joe."

"I lost weight, I had the Ethiopian thing happening, with the skinny arms and the stomach thing happening." But it was worse for his bandmates, Ferreira said. "These guys really had to swallow a lot of pride."

Eight months later Tantric's demo caught the ear of Maverick Records, the two parties soon came to a deal which allowed the band to have the finances to record a strong and well healthy album. The album was recorded in Nashville with producer Toby Wright producing the album.

=== Tantric (album) ===
Ferreira's debut album with Tantric titled Tantric was recorded and completed by October 2000. The album was released February 13, 2001. The album peaked at number seventy-one on the Billboard 200 charts and produced a number one Mainstream rock hit with the song "Breakdown". The album produced two more singles as well, titled "Astounded" and "Mourning". Both songs charted fairly well. Ferreira went on tour with Tantric in support of the album, touring with the likes of Creed and Kid Rock.

=== After We Go ===
In 2003 Ferreira entered the studio to record Tantric's sophomore studio album titled After We Go with the rest of the band. After a frustrating recording process caused from their label, Tantric finally released the lead single of their new album titled "Hey Now" on December 9, 2003. After We Go was released February 24, 2004, making it Ferreira's second studio effort with Tantric.

=== Tantric III ===
In 2005 Ferreira entered the studio once again to record with Tantric on their third studio album which was set to be titled Tantric III. The album was set to be released in May 2006 but was shelved due to Tantric being released from Maverick Records on Ferreira's birthday on March 7, 2006.

On May 8, 2007, three songs from Tantric III were released on the band's Myspace page but was largely overshadowed by guitarist Todd Whitener's departure from the band the same day. Whiteners departure caused Ferreira to be the only remaining founding member left in the band after Jesse Vest left in 2005, Matt Taul was arrested on drug charges and could no longer tour and then Todd Whitener's frustration with the band's struggle to succeed again caused him to opt-out of Tantric. Because of Ferreira being the only original member Tantric III was shelved indefinitely, however Ferreira expressed his interest of leaking some of the songs out to fans for free as an appreciation for the continued support. Ferreira leaked out three songs to YouTube titled "Letting Go", the original version of "The One" and "Fall Down" featuring hip-hop group Nappy Roots.

In late May 2007, Ferreira formed a side project band called "State of the Art" with former Fuel and Puddle of Mudd members. The group recorded an album but the album was only released through the band's Myspace page, making it scarce and hard to find.

The members in State of the Art would become the new Tantric members.

== 2008–2012 ==
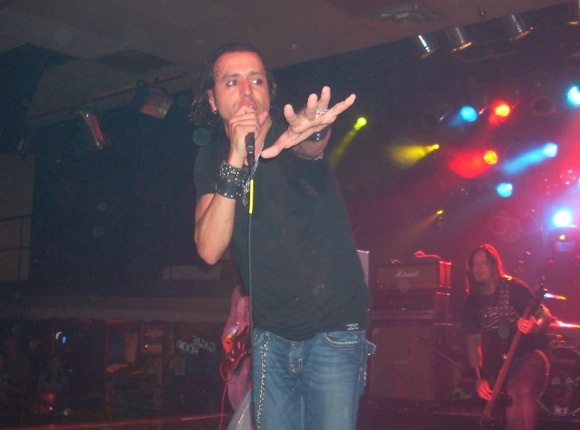
Ferreira performing in 2009

=== The End Begins ===
Disappointed but headstrong Ferreira started searching for new bandmates to keep Tantric alive. He enlisted former Fuel drummer Kevin Miller and, through mutual friend Nuno Bettencourt, Dramagods bassist/ShredKing Joe Pessia. Erik Leonhardt would become bassist and Marcus Ratzenboeck rounded out the new Tantric lineup with the electric violin. Shortly thereafter, the band announced their deal with the independent label Silent Majority Group and their new management company JHMP.

Ferreira released his third studio album with Tantric with a new entirely new band lineup and new label, the album was titled The End Begins and was released April 22, 2008. The album spawned a hit single titled "Down & Out", the album sold well over 70,000 copies the first week.

While touring in support of Tantric's previous album Ferreira started writing and recording songs for a new Tantric album while on tour.

=== Mind Control ===
Ferreira released his fourth album with Tantric titled Mind Control on August 4, 2009. The album produced two singles titled "Coming Undone" and the title track "Mind Control".

Tantric's band lineup changed consistently while touring in supporting of the Mind Control album making Ferreira the only consistent member and the heart and soul of the band.

On November 23, 2010, Ferreira released a cover of the Christmas classic "Carol of the Bells" on iTunes, making it the first time he's ever released music under his name and not Tantric's.

From the fall of 2010 throughout the summer of 2013 Ferreira and Tantric remained relatively quiet with the exception of Ferreira saying he starting writing music for a new Tantric album in November 2010 via Tantric's Facebook, Tantric's lineup changed consistently making Ferreira the only sole member. Ferreira still continued to tour under the Tantric name but no major dates were announced during that timeframe.

== 2013–present ==
=== 37 Channels ===
On July 17, 2013, it was officially announced via Pavement Entertainment that Tantric had signed to their label and would be releasing their fifth album studio album titled 37 Channels on September 17, 2013. Hugo Ferreira remained the only sole member on Tantric at the time of the album's recording and release. Hugo recruited Austin Winkler, Shooter Jennings, Leif Garrett and David '2B' Mouser for guest vocals on the album, Kenny Olson (Kid Rock) and Kevin McCreery was brought in to do the lead guitar on the album, Scott Bartlett, Hugo Ferreira himself and Johnny K. were in charge for secondary guitar on the album, Kevin McCreery was in charge for the rhythm guitar on the album, Gary Morse was in charge for the pedal steel guitar on the album. Greg Upchurch and Emanuel Cole was in charge for drums on the album, John Abel and Hugo Ferreira himself was in charge of bass on the album and Hugo played the piano on the album himself as well.

In an interview with Music Junkie Press posted on the August 27, 2013, Ferreira revealed that he did all the writing and musical production on the new upcoming album titled 37 Channels himself except where noted, he stated it was his ultimate baby and that he was fully in charge and oversaw every aspect of the record, he also stated it took him over three years to completely get the record finished. He also revealed in the same interview that he waited till the album was 100% done before signing to a label because he did not want the record company in control of the record's sound or style.

Ferreira also revealed he wrote 116 songs for the 37 Channels album, and cut the recording process down to 19 songs.

The album faced fairly well reviews debuting at its peak position at #24 on the US Hard Rock albums charts. Soon after the release of the album in the fall of 2013 Hugo recruited drummer TJ Taylor, bassist Scott Wilson and guitarist Derek Isaacs and went on to tour in support of 37 Channels. Since then they have become official members of the band.

=== Blue Room Archives ===
On August 1, 2014, Ferreira announced on Tantric's official Facebook page that they would be releasing a new album called Blue Room Archives on September 30, 2014. The album will contain seven previously unreleased songs that was spanned throughout Tantric's career and newly recorded acoustic versions of their two biggest hits "Breakdown" and "Mourning" along with two new remixes of their previously released songs "Mind Control" and "Fall To The Ground" totaling 11 tracks altogether. The album will be released via Pavement Entertainment. To help promote the album the band is offering pre-orders that are signed by Ferreira for US$20.00. The offer ended on September 1, 2014.

The band revealed the title of the album came from the Ferreira's home studio that they named "The Blue Room".

Ferreira comments: "This isn't so much a premeditated album, but a collection of music I have done that I always loved extremely but never found a place for. It's songs in their purest form, no flashy production or elaborate theme. Imagine it as a mix tape of songs I wrote or co-wrote that stand alone uniquely. A inside view of the other side of a tantric state of mind."

The album spawned a single titled "Cynical" it was released via SoundCloud.

Blue Room Archives was released on September 30, 2014, as planned, making it the release of their sixth studio album.

Ferreira will tour the "Blue Room Archives" tour shortly after the album's release, the band will be playing many shows headlining and supporting throughout late 2014 and 2015 in support of the album.

On April 2, 2015, it was announced that Ferreira had separated his shoulder while playing on tour, Ferreira tried toughing out a few shows but eventually the pain was too much and Tantric had to cancel the rest of their tour dates in April. Ferreira stated via Facebook that he requires surgery but Tantric eventually resumed touring on May 11, 2015.

== Legal issues ==
In August 2017, Ferreira was charged with "forgery of Registry of Motor Vehicle documents, failure to properly document the sale of motor vehicles, and misrepresenting residency to avoid paying excise tax." In August 2017 he had a warrant out for his arrest for failing to appear in Fitchburg District Court on charges that he concealed a vehicle's identification by attaching the wrong plates. All the charges were dismissed upon payment of restitution.

Ferreira was accused of "persuading a woman who was suffering from brain cancer to give them her car and a check for $2,000, according to a police report. Ferreira promised the woman he would use the money to purchase her another vehicle." This was not the case and the woman ultimately pressed charges. The charges were dismissed as part of a plea deal in which Ferreira was ordered to pay restitution, according to court documents.

In March 2018, Ferreira was arrested from the Hyatt Hotel in Marlborough, MA and charged with receiving stolen property over $250.
