= Silent Majority Group =

- Parent company: Warner Music Group
- Founded: 2006
- Founder: Jeff Hanson
- Distributor(s): Warner Music Group/Independent Label Group/ADA
- Genre: Alternative rock
- Country of origin: U.S.
- Official website: silentmajoritygroup.net

Silent Majority Group is a record label founded in 2006 by former Creed, Alter Bridge, and Sevendust artist manager Jeff Hanson that concentrates on finding and developing up-and-coming alternative, rock and pop acts such as Framing Hanley and Brother Sundance, as well as providing a home for established acts such as Candlebox and Tantric. The label also provides artist and producer management. SMG is promoted and distributed by both Kobalt / Awal and ADA/Warner Music Group.

== Roster ==
- Blacklite District
- Brother Sundance

== Former ==
- Candlebox
- Course of Nature
- Framing Hanley
- Sevendust
- Tantric
- One Day Alive
