= MVP Baseball (video game series) =

Video game series

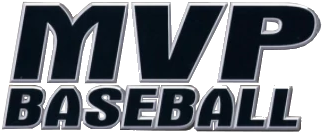
- Genres: Sports (baseball); Simulation
- Publisher: EA Sports
- First release: MVP Baseball 2003; March 10, 2003
- Latest release: MVP 07: NCAA Baseball; February 6, 2007

MVP Baseball is a baseball game series published by EA Sports, running from 2003 to 2007 with five games produced. In 2003, MVP became the official successor to EA's long-running Triple Play Baseball series, and it simulated Major League Baseball from 2003 to 2005. However, an exclusive licensing deal between Major League Baseball and Take-Two Interactive in 2005 prohibited EA Sports from making another MLB game until 2012. In response, EA made NCAA college baseball games in 2006 and 2007, but discontinued the series in 2008 because of poor sales.

The series is well-regarded, and MVP Baseball 2005 in particular.

== History ==
=== MVP Baseball 2003 ===
MVP Baseball 2003 was released in 2003 as the successor to EA's Triple Play games, though it bore little more than a graphical similarity to its predecessors, which had been heavily maligned by critics in the series' final years.

Introducing an innovative pitch meter and zone-based hitting system (see below), MVP 2003 was well received by critics, most of whom considered the game's overhaul to be a major improvement over Triple Play′s last entry. At the review-aggregation site Metacritic, MVP 2003 was given a score of 81/100 for the PlayStation 2 and 82/100 for the Xbox.

Randy Johnson and Miguel Tejada were the cover players.

The 2003 game is the last game that uses a points system for player's salary, starting with the 2004 game an actual dollar amount is used for salaries. The 2003 game does not penalize a user for releasing a player during the season in franchise mode, whereas the 2004 and 2005 games invoke a salary penalty for releasing a player under contract.

=== MVP Baseball 2004 & 2005 ===
Building on MVP 2003's surprisingly successful rookie effort, the 2004 edition made major refinements to both the game's control scheme and its dynasty mode. In a baseball gaming first, MVP 2004 was licensed by both the MLB and Minor League Baseball, featuring real minor-league teams at the Class AA & AAA levels. These improvements netted the PS2 and Xbox versions of MVP 2004 twin scores of 90/100 at Metacritic, far outpacing the competing All-Star Baseball 2005 and ESPN Major League Baseball.

Albert Pujols was the cover player for the 2004 installment of the series.

MVP Baseball 2005 brought subtle changes to the MVP 2004 formula, including a "hitter's eye" system with color codes that helped players identify pitch types out of the pitcher's hand, as well as an owner mode, the addition of Class A minor-league teams to dynasty mode, and spring training minigames. Reviewers continued to rate MVP highly, with Metacritic scores of 86 and 87 for the Xbox and PS2 versions, respectively, though MVP 2005′s marks were slightly lower than those of its predecessor. Even so, the game still edged out 2k Sports' Major League Baseball 2K5 among critics.

Reigning World Series MVP Manny Ramirez was featured on the cover of the 2005 installment of the series.

In 2005, MVP Baseball released for PlayStation Portable.

=== Exclusive licensing deal ===
In 2005, in response to EA Sports' exclusive license with the National Football League and ESPN, Take-Two Interactive signed an exclusive third-party licensing contract with Major League Baseball (MLB), MLBPA and MLBAM to produce MLB games in its 2K Sports series, making MVP Baseball 2005 the last MLB game in the series. The agreement, which ran from Spring 2006 to 2012, allowed only Take-Two Interactive and the console manufacturers Sony, Microsoft, and Nintendo to produce MLB titles for their respective platforms, but barred other third party developers such as EA Sports from continuing or developing their own MLB games.

MVP Baseball 2005 was the last official MLB release from EA Sports, also official support for the game ended. Despite that, a very active modding community exists for the PC version of the game, who kept the game up-to-date the last decade. Modders have added much to the game, including roster updates, uniforms, players, and stadiums, as well as total conversions for foreign and classic teams.

=== MVP: NCAA Baseball ===
Barred from making MLB games, EA Sports made college baseball games for 2006 and 2007. Both editions of MVP: NCAA Baseball were officially licensed by the NCAA and released for the Xbox and PlayStation 2. The games featured actual NCAA teams and stadiums, though there were no real players.

A new "load and fire" batting system was integrated in 2006, to be followed by the addition of a "rock and fire" pitching system in 2007, both features that would later be emulated by MLB 11: The Show and Major League Baseball 2K11 on seventh-generation consoles. The 2007 installment also featured online integration with ESPN, including commentary from Mike Patrick and former Stanford All-American Kyle Peterson. Former University of Texas star David Maroul was featured on the cover of MVP 06, while MVP 07′s cover athlete was former Long Beach State pitcher Jered Weaver.

=== MVP Baseball Online ===
In South Korea, EA has released 3 games called MVP Baseball Online 2012–2014.

=== Possible revival ===
In 2011, EA Sports released an MLB-licensed game for Facebook called World Series Superstars, which simulates team management, leading to speculation that MVP Baseball would return to consoles after the 2K Sports licensing deal expired in 2012.

In 2013, EA Sports executive vice president Andrew Wilson told video game blog Polygon that "there is an inherent passion for baseball inside EA Sports", but that there were three barriers to EA's willingness to develop a new MLB title: the need for a modern game engine to power the game; EA's focus on other sports titles like NBA Live; and that the status of MLB's licensing agreement with 2K Sports was unclear to them. In 2015, an EA Sports spokesman told Grantland that Wilson's comments were "still 'the most accurate reflection' of the company's position on getting back into baseball: Maybe later, but not now." In 2018, EA Sports executive vice president Cam Weber said, "I would love to have a baseball game in our portfolio. ... It's something that once again, every couple years, we take a look and we talk about and theorize about what it might look like to get back into something like baseball." In 2021, a website called Sports Gamers Online published an article stating EA's Vancouver studio was working on a new baseball game but that it was years away from release.

In 2022, EA Sports published MLB Tap Sports Baseball 2022 for smartphones. In 2023, EA Sports published Super Mega Baseball 4, its first console baseball video game since the MVP series. SMB 4 was developed by Metalhead Studios, which had been acquired by EA in 2021.

== Features ==
=== Players ===
Until 2005, the game featured all players in the Major League Baseball Players Association (MLBPA), as well as fictionalized counterparts for players who are not in the union. Barry Bonds, while an MLBPA member, did not sign the common MLBPA licensing agreement and was replaced by the fictional Jon Dowd. Some players who are not members of the MLBPA were omitted completely. For example, Kevin Millar, who is not a member of the MLBPA, was omitted completely from the 2004 edition, with David Ortiz leaving his real-life designated hitter spot and filling in at first base for the Boston Red Sox. In MVP Baseball 2005, he was replaced by the fictional Anthony Friese.

MVP Baseball 2004 featured a unique addition to any baseball game, allowing users to play as the Minor League affiliations of Major League teams, a feature that was expanded in the following year. Various editions of the game have featured Randy Johnson, Miguel Tejada, Albert Pujols, and Manny Ramírez on its cover. Of those four, Tejada and Pujols have won Most Valuable Player (MVP) awards during their careers, and the other two have been named MVPs of the World series. Randy Johnson has also won the Cy Young Award five times.

=== Innovations ===
Upon its release in 2003, one of the game's most inventive aspects was its pitch/throw meter. Until then, most baseball games' pitching schemes required players simply to press the button corresponding to the pitch they wanted to throw, and hold the button down for a certain length of time to determine how hard the pitch was thrown. In MVP Baseball, the player first holds down the pitch button (or throw button) to judge the power; once the desired power level is attained, the player must release the button and attempt to tap the same button within a target area. The closer the player gets to the target area, the more accurate the pitch or throw will be. While innovative within the field of baseball games, EA in fact adapted this feature from golf games, which often feature a moving meter to determine the power and accuracy of shots (golf games largely abandoned shot meters around the time that MVP Baseball introduced it).

The game also incorporated a strike zone divided into nine areas of the plate designed as "hot and cold zones". The feature uses color-coding with the colors red, white, and blue to represent the player's ability to hit pitches in the given area; red, white, and blue indicate whether the player hits well, neutrally, or poorly, respectively, in the given segment of the strike zone.

=== Announcers ===
Duane Kuiper and Mike Krukow, television and radio announcers for the San Francisco Giants, provided narration and commentary for the series. They had been approached in September 2002 and accepted EA's offer. They recorded most of the lines for all three games during the 2002-2003 offseason, with additional lines for the 2004 and 2005 editions recorded as necessary. Some of the sessions were recorded during the MLB regular season, often leaving Krukow and Kuiper hoarse during actual Giants games. They pronounced hundreds of names with multiple inflections. Some calls were recorded while they watched real games on TV. In a 2025 interview about the 20th anniversary of the 2005 game's release, Krukow said, "In our wildest dreams, never did we feel that it was going to be remembered 20 years after with the way the world of video games changes. It's unique in that it's managed to still maintain its life with respect and affection."

=== Soundtracks ===
Like all recent EA Sports games, the soundtrack to each MVP Baseball title contains licensed songs, called EA Trax. The MVP Baseball series typically featured alternative rock, ranging from mainstream artists like Sum 41 to indie acts like stellastarr*. The games featured several minor hits before they became popular such as "C'mon C'mon" by The Von Bondies which is also used as the theme song for the TV show Rescue Me.

2003 soundtrack:

- The All-American Rejects – "Swing, Swing"
- Boy Sets Fire – "Handful of Redemption"
- The Donnas – "Who Invited You"
- The Exies – "Without"
- Hed PE – "Blackout"
- Revis – "Caught in the Rain"
- Burning Brides – "Arctic Snow"
- OK Go – "Don't Ask Me"
- Pacifier – "Bulletproof"
- Shinedown – "Fly From the Inside"
- Socialburn – "Everyone"
- Soundtrack of Our Lives – "Sister Surround"
- Sum 41 – "All Messed Up"
- Taproot – "Poem"

2004 soundtrack:

- Chronic Future – "Time and Time Again"
- Hoodoo Gurus – "Bittersweet"
- Lucky Boys Confusion – "Hey Driver"
- Maxeen – "Please"
- Seven Wiser – "Take Me As I Am"
- Snow Patrol – "Spitting Games"
- Stellastarr – "My Coco"
- Steriogram – "Walkie Talkie Man"
- To My Surprise – "Get It to Go"
- Trust Company – "Surfacing"
- The Von Bondies – "C'mon C'mon"
- Jonny Lives! – "Get Steady"
- Home Town Hero – "Robbers"

2005 soundtrack:

- ...And You Will Know Us by the Trail of Dead (called "...Trail of Dead" in the game) – "Let It Dive"
- The Bravery – "An Honest Mistake"
- Donots – "We Got the Noise"
- Dropkick Murphys – "Tessie"
- The High Speed Scene – "The IROC-Z Song"
- Hot Hot Heat – "You Owe Me an IOU"
- Louis XIV – "Finding Out True Love Is Blind"
- Rock n Roll Soldiers – "Funny Little Feeling"
- The Zutons – "Pressure Point"

2006 soundtrack:

- Action Action – "Paper Cliche"
- Aiden – "Die Romantic"
- Bayside – "Devotion And Desire"
- Hawthorne Heights – "This Is Who We Are"
- Silverstein – "Smile In Your Sleep"
- The Forecast – "These Lights"
- The Audition – "Approach The Bench"
- The Black Maria – "Organs"
- The Junior Varsity – "Get Comfortable"
- Waterdown – "Repeater"

== See also ==
- MVP Baseball 2005
- MVP 06: NCAA Baseball
- MVP 07: NCAA Baseball
