= 2004 MTV Video Music Awards =

Award ceremony

- Date: Sunday, August 29, 2004
- Location: American Airlines Arena, Miami, Florida
- Country: United States
- Hosted by: none
- Most awards: Outkast and Jay-Z (4)
- Most nominations: Jay-Z (6)

Television/radio coverage
- Network: MTV
- Produced by: Michael Dempsey; Salli Frattini; Dave Sirulnick
- Directed by: Louis J. Horvitz

The 2004 MTV Video Music Awards aired live on August 29, 2004, honoring the best music videos from the previous year. The show took place at the American Airlines Arena in Miami, Florida, and, unlike in previous years, had no host.

== Background ==
MTV announced on April 16 that the 2004 Video Music Awards would be held on August 29 at the American Airlines Arena in Miami. The move to Miami was partially caused by a date conflict with the 2004 Republican National Convention, which was held from August 30 to September 2 in the VMAs' traditional location of New York City. Nominees were announced on July 27 at a press conference hosted by Missy Elliott and Usher in Miami. At the same press conference, MTV announced that the ceremony would not have a host, partially due to the scale of the venue. The ceremony broadcast was preceded by the 2004 MTV Video Music Awards Pre-Show by the Shore, marking the first time since 1990 that the Opening Act branding was not used for a VMAs pre-show. Hosted by Kurt Loder and SuChin Pak with reports from John Norris, Sway, and Gideon Yago, the broadcast featured red carpet interviews. The broadcast marked the first time that MTV used a tape delay for the VMAs, which indirectly resulted from the Super Bowl XXXVIII halftime show controversy. Several aspects of the ceremony tied into MTV's Choose or Lose 2004 campaign encouraging youth voter turnout, including Outkast's performance and the appearance of the Bush sisters and Kerry sisters.

== Performances ==
Artist(s)	Song(s)
Pre-show
Jadakiss; Anthony Hamilton	"Why"
Ashlee Simpson	"Pieces of Me"
New Found Glory	"All Downhill from Here"
Main show
Usher	"Confessions Part II" "Yeah!" (featuring Ludacris and Lil Jon)
Jet	"Are You Gonna Be My Girl"
Hoobastank	"The Reason"
Yellowcard	"Ocean Avenue"
Kanye West	"Jesus Walks" "All Falls Down" (featuring Syleena Johnson and John Legend) "Through the Wire" (featuring Chaka Khan)
Lil Jon & The East Side Boyz; Ying Yang Twins; Petey Pablo; Terror Squad; Fat Joe	"Get Low" "Salt Shaker" "Freek-a-Leek" "Lean Back" (Note: Lil Jon & The East Side Boyz, Ying Yang Twins, and Petey Pablo all performed on each other's songs before joining Terror Squad and Fat Joe for "Lean Back.")
Jessica Simpson	"With You" "Angels"
Nelly; Christina Aguilera	"Tilt Ya Head Back"
Alicia Keys	"If I Ain't Got You" "Higher Ground" (featuring Lenny Kravitz and Stevie Wonder)
The Polyphonic Spree	"Hold Me Now"
OutKast	"Prototype" "The Way You Move" "Ghettomusick" "Hey Ya!"

== Presenters ==
=== Pre-show ===
- Kurt Loder and SuChin Pak – announced the winners of the professional categories and Breakthrough Video

=== Main show ===
- Jennifer Lopez – opened the show and introduced Usher
- Will Smith – introduced Shaquille O'Neal and presented Best Pop Video with him
- Hilary Duff and Matthew Lillard – presented Best Rap Video
- Shakira – introduced Jet, Hoobastank and Yellowcard
- Jon Stewart – appeared in several vignettes explaining the Viewer's Choice award voting procedures
- Omarion and Eva Mendes – presented Best Female Video
- Marc Anthony – introduced Kanye West
- Christina Aguilera and Missy Elliott – presented Best Male Video
- Carson Daly – introduced the Kerry and Bush sisters and the next pair of presenters
- The Kerry (Alexandra and Vanessa) and Bush (Barbara and Jenna) sisters – urged viewers to vote on the next elections and reminded them to donate to the Red Cross to help the victims of Hurricane Charley
- Lenny Kravitz and Naomi Campbell – presented Best R&B Video
- Dave Chappelle – performed a short comic monologue and introduced Lil Jon, Petey Pablo, and the Terror Squad; later he also presented Jay-Z with a gift for his retirement
- Gwen Stefani and Owen Wilson – presented Best Rock Video
- Mary-Kate and Ashley Olsen – introduced Jessica Simpson
- D12 and Good Charlotte (Benji and Joel Madden) – presented Best Video Game Soundtrack
- Rev. Al Sharpton – appeared during one of Jon Stewart's vignettes
- Jimmy Fallon, Queen Latifah and Wayne Coyne – presented Best Hip-Hop Video
- Will Forte – played "Gary," the announcer with whom Fallon had a verbal spat while trying to present an award, and introduced Wayne Coyne
- Xzibit and Ludacris – introduced Nelly and Christina Aguilera
- P. Diddy and Mase – presented Best Dance Video
- Christina Milian and LL Cool J – introduced Alicia Keys
- Paris Hilton and Nick Lachey – presented Best Group Video
- Ashlee Simpson and Tony Hawk – presented Best New Artist in a Video
- Alicia Keys – paid tribute to Ray Charles
- Beastie Boys and "Sasquatch" – presented the MTV2 Award
- Mandy Moore and Marilyn Manson – introduced The Polyphonic Spree
- JoJo – introduced American gold medalists Kaitlin Sandeno, Kerri Walsh, Misty May and Carly Patterson, and presented Viewer's Choice with them
- Gwyneth Paltrow – presented Video of the Year
- John Mellencamp and Amy Lee – introduced OutKast
  - Also, MTV VJs Sway, La La, Damien Fahey and Vanessa Minnillo emceed and interviewed celebrities backstage before several commercial breaks

== Winners and nominees ==
Winners are in bold text.

Video of the Year	Best Male Video
**OutKast – "Hey Ya!"**; D12 – "My Band"; Jay-Z – "99 Problems"; Britney Spears – "Toxic"; Usher (featuring Ludacris and Lil Jon) – "Yeah!"	**Usher (featuring Ludacris and Lil Jon) – "Yeah!"**; Jay-Z – "99 Problems"; Prince – "Musicology"; Justin Timberlake – "Señorita"; Kanye West (featuring Syleena Johnson) – "All Falls Down"
Best Female Video	Best Group Video
**Beyoncé – "Naughty Girl"**; Christina Aguilera – "The Voice Within"; Alicia Keys – "If I Ain't Got You"; Jessica Simpson – "With You"; Britney Spears – "Toxic"	**No Doubt – "It's My Life"**; D12 – "My Band"; Good Charlotte – "Hold On"; Hoobastank – "The Reason"; Maroon 5 – "This Love"
Best New Artist in a Video	Best Pop Video
**Maroon 5 – "This Love"**; The Darkness – "I Believe in a Thing Called Love"; Jet – "Are You Gonna Be My Girl"; JoJo – "Leave (Get Out)"; Kanye West (featuring Syleena Johnson) – "All Falls Down"; Yellowcard – "Ocean Avenue"	**No Doubt – "It's My Life"**; Hilary Duff – "Come Clean"; Avril Lavigne – "Don't Tell Me"; Jessica Simpson – "With You"; Britney Spears – "Toxic"
Best Rock Video	Best R&B Video
**Jet – "Are You Gonna Be My Girl"**; The Darkness – "I Believe in a Thing Called Love"; Evanescence – "My Immortal"; Hoobastank – "The Reason"; Linkin Park – "Breaking the Habit"	**Alicia Keys – "If I Ain't Got You"**; Beyoncé – "Me, Myself and I"; Brandy (featuring Kanye West) – "Talk About Our Love"; R. Kelly – "Step in the Name of Love (remix)"; Usher – "Burn"
Best Rap Video	Best Hip-Hop Video
**Jay-Z – "99 Problems"**; 50 Cent (featuring Snoop Dogg and G-Unit) – "P.I.M.P. (remix)"; D12 – "My Band"; Lil Jon and The East Side Boyz (featuring Ying Yang Twins) – "Get Low"; Ludacris (featuring Shawnna) – "Stand Up"	**OutKast – "Hey Ya!"**; The Black Eyed Peas – "Hey Mama"; Chingy (featuring Ludacris and Snoop Dogg) – "Holidae Inn"; Nelly (featuring P. Diddy and Murphy Lee) – "Shake Ya Tailfeather"; Kanye West (featuring Syleena Johnson) – "All Falls Down"
Best Dance Video	Breakthrough Video
**Usher (featuring Ludacris and Lil Jon) – "Yeah!"**; Beyoncé – "Naughty Girl"; The Black Eyed Peas – "Hey Mama"; Missy Elliott – "I'm Really Hot"; Britney Spears – "Toxic"	**Franz Ferdinand – "Take Me Out"**; Modest Mouse – "Float On"; New Found Glory – "All Downhill from Here"; Steriogram – "Walkie Talkie Man"; Kanye West (featuring Syleena Johnson) – "All Falls Down"; The White Stripes – "The Hardest Button to Button"
Best Direction in a Video	Best Choreography in a Video
**Jay-Z – "99 Problems" (Director: Mark Romanek)**; No Doubt – "It's My Life" (Director: David LaChapelle); OutKast – "Hey Ya!" (Director: Bryan Barber); Steriogram – "Walkie Talkie Man" (Director: Michel Gondry); The White Stripes – "The Hardest Button to Button" (Director: Michel Gondry)	**The Black Eyed Peas – "Hey Mama" (Choreographer: Fatima Robinson)**; Beyoncé – "Naughty Girl" (Choreographers: Frank Gatson and LaVelle Smith Jr.); Missy Elliott – "I'm Really Hot" (Choreographer: Hi-Hat); Sean Paul – "Like Glue" (Choreographer: Tanisha Scott); Usher (featuring Ludacris and Lil Jon) – "Yeah!" (Choreographer: Devyne Stephens)
Best Special Effects in a Video	Best Art Direction in a Video
**OutKast – "Hey Ya!" (Special Effects: Elad Offer, Chris Eckardt and Money Shots)**; Incubus – "Megalomaniac" (Special Effects: Jake Banks, Matt Marquis and Stardust Studios); Modest Mouse – "Float On" (Special Effects: Christopher Mills and Revolver Film Company); Steriogram – "Walkie Talkie Man" (Special Effects: Angus Kneale, Jamie Scott and The Mill); The White Stripes – "The Hardest Button to Button" (Special Effects: Richard de Carteret, Angus Kneale and Dirk Greene)	**OutKast – "Hey Ya!" (Art Director: Eric Beauchamp)**; Alicia Keys – "You Don't Know My Name" (Art Director: Rob Buono); No Doubt – "It's My Life" (Art Director: Kristen Vallow); Steriogram – "Walkie Talkie Man" (Art Director: Lauri Faggioni); Yeah Yeah Yeahs – "Maps" (Art Director: Jeff Everett)
Best Editing in a Video	Best Cinematography in a Video
**Jay-Z – "99 Problems" (Editor: Robert Duffy)**; Jet – "Are You Gonna Be My Girl" (Editor: Megan Bee); Simple Plan – "Perfect" (Editor: Declan Whitebloom); The White Stripes – "The Hardest Button to Button" (Editors: Charlie Johnston, Geoff Hounsell and Andy Grieve); Yeah Yeah Yeahs – "Maps" (Editor: Anthony Cerniello)	**Jay-Z – "99 Problems" (Director of Photography: Joaquín Baca-Asay)**; Christina Aguilera – "The Voice Within" (Director of Photography: Jeff Cronenweth); Beyoncé – "Naughty Girl" (Director of Photography: James Hawkinson); No Doubt – "It's My Life" (Director of Photography: Jeff Cronenweth); Yeah Yeah Yeahs – "Maps" (Director of Photography: Shawn Kim)
Best Video Game Soundtrack	MTV2 Award
**Tony Hawk's Underground (Activision)**; Madden NFL 2004 (Electronic Arts); Need for Speed: Underground (Electronic Arts); SSX 3 (Electronic Arts); True Crime: Streets of LA (Activision)	**Yellowcard – "Ocean Avenue"**; Elephant Man – "Pon Di River"; Franz Ferdinand – "Take Me Out"; Modest Mouse – "Float On"; Twista (featuring Kanye West and Jamie Foxx) – "Slow Jamz"; Yeah Yeah Yeahs – "Maps"
Viewer's Choice	
**Linkin Park – "Breaking the Habit"**; Christina Aguilera – "The Voice Within"; Good Charlotte – "Hold On"; Simple Plan – "Perfect"; Yellowcard – "Ocean Avenue"

== Artists with multiple wins and nominations ==
Artists who received multiple awards
Wins	Artist
4	Jay-Z
4	OutKast
2	No Doubt
2	Usher

Artists who received multiple nominations
Nominations	Artist
6	Jay-Z
5	Beyoncé
5	No Doubt
5	OutKast
5	Usher
4	Britney Spears
4	Kanye West
4	Steriogram
4	The White Stripes
4	Yeah Yeah Yeahs
3	Alicia Keys
3	Christina Aguilera
3	D12
3	Electronic Arts
3	Jet
3	Modest Mouse
3	The Black Eyed Peas
3	Yellowcard
2	Activision
2	Franz Ferdinand
2	Good Charlotte
2	Hoobastank
2	Jessica Simpson
2	Linkin Park
2	Maroon 5
2	Missy Elliott
2	Simple Plan
2	The Darkness

== Music Videos with multiple wins and nominations ==
Music Videos that received multiple awards
Wins	Artist	Music Video
4	Jay-Z	"99 Problems"
4	OutKast	"Hey Ya!"
2	No Doubt	"It's My Life"
2	Usher (featuring Ludacris and Lil Jon)	"Yeah!"

Music Videos that received multiple nominations
Nominations	Artist	Music Video
6	Jay-Z	"99 Problems"
5	No Doubt	"It's My Life"
5	OutKast	"Hey Ya!"
4	Beyoncé	"Naughty Girl"
4	Britney Spears	"Toxic"
4	Kanye West (featuring Syleena Johnson)	"All Falls Down"
4	Steriogram	"Walkie Talkie Man"
4	The White Stripes	"The Hardest Button to Button"
4	Usher (featuring Ludacris and Lil Jon)	"Yeah!"
4	Yeah Yeah Yeahs	"Maps"
3	Christina Aguilera	"The Voice Within"
3	D12	"My Band"
3	Jet	"Are You Gonna Be My Girl"
3	Modest Mouse	"Float On"
3	The Black Eyed Peas	"Hey Mama"
3	Yellowcard	"Ocean Avenue"
2	Alicia Keys	"If I Ain't Got You"
2	Franz Ferdinand	"Take Me Out"
2	Good Charlotte	"Hold On"
2	Hoobastank	"The Reason"
2	Jessica Simpson	"With You"
2	Linkin Park	"Breaking the Habit"
2	Maroon 5	"This Love"
2	Missy Elliott	"I'm Really Hot"
2	Simple Plan	"Perfect"
2	The Darkness	"I Believe in a Thing Called Love"

== See also ==
- 2004 MTV Europe Music Awards
