= All Riot =

Studio album by Waterdown
- Released: 24 January 2006
- Recorded: August–October 2005
- Studios: Lauterstudios, Munster
- Genres: Hardcore punk, post-hardcore, metalcore
- Length: 36:40
- Label: Victory
- Producers: Ingo Knollmann, Waterdown

Waterdown chronology
The Files You Have on Me (2003)	All Riot (2006)	Into the Flames (2012)

All Riot is the third full-length studio album by German post-hardcore band Waterdown, released on 24 January 2006, through Victory Records. Unlike their previous albums, The album marked to a more aggressive sound compared to their previous work, combining melodic hardcore with post-hardcore and metalcore elements.

The album was recorded in 2005 and represented Waterdown's continued evolution in sound. It showcased heavier riffs and more politically charged lyrics compared to their earlier releases.

Their song "Repeater" appeared in the video game MVP 06: NCAA Baseball and the comedy romance-drama film The Last Kiss.

== Reception ==
Professional ratings
Review scores
Source	Rating
AllMusic	3.5/5 stars
Alternative Press	4/5
Metal.de	5/10

In a 3.5-star review for AllMusic, Greg Prato stated, "Waterdown's All Riot seems custom-made for those who like their emo with a bit of muscle (or vice versa – metal with melody)."

Rating the album five, David of Metal.de noted the album as "plunging" "into mediocrity, although solid but certainly not up to the mark."

Kevin Stewart-Panko of Alternative Press remarked, "On All Riot, they've raised things even higher, dressing up their muscular screamo with hummable rock choruses, some electronic flourishes," giving it a rating of four.

== Track listing ==
No.	Title	Length
1.	"Sleep Well"	3:35
2.	"Cut the Cord"	3:20
3.	"Disassembled"	3:57
4.	"Chewing on Lies"	3:27
5.	"You Are the One"	3:24
6.	"My Hopelessness and Me"	3:39
7.	"Parasites"	3:01
8.	"Moshpit Etiquette"	3:33
9.	"Repeater"	3:45
10.	"Til the Very End"	2:45
11.	"Recruit"	2:14
Total length:		36:40

- Music videos were released for "My Hopelessness and Me" and "Cut the Cord".

== Personnel ==
- Ingo Rieser – vocals
- Axel Pralat – guitar
- Holger Behrens – guitar
- Christian Kruse – bass
- Philipp Meyer – drums
- Michael Janczak – vocals
