= Man of the House (2005 film) =

2005 American crime comedy film

- Theatrical release poster
- Directed by: Stephen Herek
- Screenplay by: Robert Ramsey; Matthew Stone; John J. McLaughlin
- Story by: John J. McLaughlin; Scott Lobdell
- Produced by: Steven Reuther; Todd Garner; Allyn Stewart
- Starring: Tommy Lee Jones; Anne Archer; Brian Van Holt; Christina Milian; Paula Garcés; Monica Keena; R. Lee Ermey
- Cinematography: Peter Menzies Jr.
- Edited by: Chris Lebenzon; Joel Negron
- Music by: David Newman
- Production companies: Columbia Pictures; Revolution Studios
- Distributed by: Sony Pictures Releasing
- Release date: February 25, 2005
- Running time: 100 minutes
- Country: United States
- Language: English
- Budget: $40 million
- Box office: $21.6 million

Man of the House is a 2005 American crime comedy film directed by Stephen Herek. The film stars Tommy Lee Jones as Roland Sharp, a lonesome Texas Ranger who goes undercover as an assistant coach to protect a group of college cheerleaders who have witnessed a murder. Much of the film was shot in Austin, Texas on the University of Texas campus.

Texas Governor Rick Perry has a cameo appearance in the film as himself. Released on February 25, 2005, the film received negative reviews, and grossed just $21 million against a budget of $40 million, making it a box office disappointment.

== Plot ==
Texas Rangers Roland Sharp and Maggie Swanson question Percy Stevens about the whereabouts of his former prison cellmate Morgan Ball, needed to testify against organized crime boss John Cortland.

Tracking down Ball to a warehouse, Ball tries to bribe Sharp with a safety deposit box key. Instead, he takes it and forces him outside, to waiting FBI Agent Eddie Zane. A sniper wounds Swanson, giving Ball a chance to escape (Swanson is shot in the chest, but survives). A group of cheerleaders from the University of Texas at Austin witness Ball's murder. Agent Zane is found shot in the arm next to Ball's body and claims he didn't see the sniper.

Anne, Teresa, Evie, Heather and Barb are taken to the police station, where they can't identify the shooter. Sharp is to protect the girls at all times, information relayed to him by the Governor of Texas. Sharp is divorced, and has an estranged 17-year-old daughter, Emma.

Without evidence, John Cortland is set free. FBI Agent Zane secretly works for him, so killed Ball and shot himself in the arm. Cortland reprimands him for not tying up loose ends, so Zane kills the hired sniper and searches for Sharp and the cheerleaders. With Swanson in the hospital recovering from her near-fatal wound, Sharp and two other Rangers must now protect the girls and secure their sorority house. Sharp moves in with them, and the other two move into a nearby fraternity house to provide overwatch and immediate backup if necessary.

Sharp's ground rules include no cell phones and to wear less revealing clothes around him. When they ignore him, he installs an industrial air conditioner, forcing them to dress warmly. Supposedly their assistant cheerleading coach specializing in conditioning, at a Longhorns football game Sharp tackles the University of Arkansas Razorback's mascot when it nears them with what turns out to be a water gun. Other mishaps occur, but Sharp's relationship with the girls begins to strengthen.

Sharp becomes attracted to Barb's English professor Molly, who draws his attention to Barb's plagiarism. Inviting her over for dinner, the girls coach him through it using an earpiece and tiny camera. After a bit, he turns them off and woos Molly himself. He tells the girls about his failed marriage and the way he feels about his estranged daughter. This interests Evie, who wants to write a paper on Emma. She calls her with the house's "emergency phone", alerting Zane to Sharp's location, as he had bugged Emma's phone.

At a "spirit rally," Sharp has to give an inspiring speech. He gets more and more impassioned, proving to the girls he finally "gets it." However, afterwards Sharp finds a bomb under their van. He saves Teresa (who had not believed someone was after them) by cutting her out of her stuck seatbelt, so she realizes the threat is real.

When Sharp is told Evie phoned Emma he calls, discovering Zane has her. He instructs Sharp to get the money from the safe deposit box to which Ball had given him the key. Neither of them are aware the cheerleaders are listening in. The next day at the meeting point, Zane reminds Sharp to cooperate or he will shoot Emma. Cuffing himself to the steering wheel after leaving his cell and issue pistol, Sharp's keys and phone in the money bag, Zane then takes off with the money and Emma as a hostage.

They get on a Mexican bus with Barb in the back. As Sharp wonders what is going on, Heather picks his handcuffs open, chasing the bus in a stolen Volkswagen Beetle. On the bus, Teresa pretends to go into labor, so Evie demands the bus stop. She attempts to steal Zane's bag, but he pulls a gun on her, so she runs away from the bus. Zane drives away in the empty bus himself.

The cheerleaders rescue Emma, while Zane attempts to cross into Mexico. Sharp causes the bus to flip by blowing out one of its tires with his personal M1911 pistol. Zane begins walking to the Mexico–United States border but the border officers close the crossing point, drawing their guns. Sharp prevents Zane's attempted suicide by cop by shooting his gun hand and handcuffing him. He and Emma are reunited. Cortland is arrested and taken back to court.

Six months later, Sharp and Molly are married, with Emma and the cheerleaders part of the wedding.

== Cast ==
- Tommy Lee Jones as Ranger Lieutenant Roland Sharp
- Anne Archer as Professor Molly McCarthy
- Brian Van Holt as FBI Agent Eddie Zane
- Christina Milian as Anne
- Paula Garces as Teresa
- Monica Keena as Evie
- Cedric the Entertainer as Percy Stevens
- Vanessa Ferlito as Heather
- Kelli Garner as Barbara "Barb" Thompson
- Paget Brewster as Coach "Binky" Beauregard
- Shea Whigham as Ranger Holt
- Curtis Armstrong as Morgan Ball
- R. Lee Ermey as Captain Nichols
- Terry Parks as Ranger Riggs
- Liz Vassey as Ranger Maggie Swanson
- James Richard Perry as Himself
- Turner Stephen Bruton as John Cortland
- Shannon Marie Woodward as Emma Sharp

== Production ==
The film, initially written by John J. McLaughlin and Scott Lobdell under the title of Cheer Up, was first acquired by Steven Reuther's Bel-Air Entertainment with Warner Bros. set to distribute. At one point in its development at Warner Bros. Jonathan Lynn was attached as director with Robert Zemeckis as producer. By August 2002, it was announced Stephen Herek was in final negotiations to direct the film which would feature Tommy Lee Jones as a hardened FBI agent who is forced to live with and protect a group of cheerleaders who witness a murder. In May 2003, it was reported that Revolution Studios had acquired the project in turnaround from Warner Bros. and Robert Ramsey and Matthew Stone providing rewrites.

== Reception ==
On the review aggregator website Rotten Tomatoes, 9% of 65 critics' reviews are positive, with an average rating of 3.4/10. The website's consensus reads: "A high-concept movie that plays out like a mediocre TV sitcom." Metacritic, which uses a weighted average, assigned the film a score of 35 out of 100, based on 20 critics, indicating "generally unfavorable" reviews. Audiences polled by CinemaScore gave the film an average grade of "B−" on an A+ to F scale.

James Berardinelli of ReelViews panned the film, rating it one star out of four and writing: "The movie is an 'action comedy' in name only – there's nothing in Man of the House that could be considered funny or exciting." He also said the movie "manages to neuter Cedric the Entertainer's capacity for humor" since "not even he is able to deliver a legitimate laugh" and that Tommy Lee Jones "comes across as taciturn and unlikable."

Stephen Hunter of The Washington Post called the film "a one screen multiplex" with "a lot of small movies bouncing around inside it, but there's no big movie on the outside." Hunter felt that by the end the "many personalities" of the film have "grown tiresome". Nonetheless, he complimented Tommy Lee Jones' "deadpan" portrayal, saying "Whenever Herek doesn't know what to do -- and that's frequently -- he cuts to Jones, radiating world-weariness with the aplomb of Fred Astaire, and it's always funny."

Dana Stevens of The New York Times wrote: "Nearly every one of the film's emotional scenes is too predictable to hit its mark, but Mr. Jones's dry delivery has its moments." Stevens found Cedric the Entertainer to be disappointing, stating that he "fails for once to live up to his name".

== Box office ==
In its opening weekend, the film grossed $8,917,251 in 2,422 theaters in the United States and Canada, ranking #5 at the box office and averaging $3,681 per theater. The film closed on April 7, 2005, with a North American domestic gross of $19,699,706 and an international gross of $1,877,918 for a worldwide gross of $21,577,624. The film was released in the United Kingdom on April 8, 2005, and opened on #14.

== Soundtrack ==
- "We Are Family" – The Pointer Sisters
- "Rising Sun" – Rusted Root
- "What U Gon' Do" – Lil Jon & the East Side Boyz
- "U Can't Touch This" – Tree Adams
- "All I Wanna Do" – Sheryl Crow
- "Should I Stay or Should I Go" – The Clash
- "Funny How Time Slips Away" – Willie Nelson
- "Bad Moon Rising" – Creedence Clearwater Revival
- "Walkie Talkie Man" – Steriogram
- "I'm Too Sexy" – Right Said Fred
