= Mike Patrick =

American journalist (1944–2025)

- Born: Michael Patrick; September 9, 1944; Clarksburg, West Virginia, U.S.
- Died: April 20, 2025 (aged 80); Fairfax, Virginia, U.S.
- Education: George Washington University (BA)
- Occupation: TV and radio sportscaster Television personality
- Years active: 1982–2018
- Known for: Sportscaster for ESPN; Sunday Night Football
- Spouse: Janet

Michael Patrick (September 9, 1944 – April 20, 2025) was an American sportscaster, known for his long tenure with ESPN.

== Early career ==
Patrick began his broadcasting career in the fall of 1966 at WVSC-Radio (now WGGI) in Somerset, Pennsylvania. In 1970, he was named Sports Director at WJXT-TV in Jacksonville, Florida, where he provided play-by-play for Jacksonville Sharks' World Football League (WFL) telecasts (1973–74). He also called Jacksonville University basketball games on both radio and television.

From 1975 until 1982, he worked for WJLA-TV.

In the 1980s, Patrick called televised ACC basketball and football games for Raycom Sports and Jefferson-Pilot Sports. He also called the October 19, 1985, Auburn vs Georgia Tech for CBS with color commentator Steve Davis. On December 21, 1985, Patrick called the Division 1-AA National Championship game on ESPN between Georgia Southern and Furman with color commentator Sam Adkins.

== ESPN ==
Patrick joined ESPN in 1982. He was best known for his role as play-by-play announcer on the network's Sunday Night Football telecasts, with Paul Maguire and Joe Theismann from 1987–2005. Patrick was briefly replaced in 2004 by Pat Summerall, while he recovered from heart bypass surgery.

For three seasons, from 1986 to 1988, he called college football on ESPN with color commentators Pat McInally (1986), Lee Corso (1987) and Kiley (1988). In 1989 he called three college games, two with commentators Gene Washington and one with Ben Bennett, while in 1990 he would call three more college games, two with Davis and on September 29 he would call his first game with commentator Mike Gottfried, calling the South Carolina vs Georgia Tech game. From 1991 through 1997, Patrick and Gottfried would call Thursday Night college football games on ESPN. In 2006, Patrick became the lead play-by-play announcer for ESPN on College Football Primetime, along with Todd Blackledge and field reporter Holly Rowe.

During the 2007 season, Patrick famously asked broadcast partner Todd Blackledge "what is Britney [Spears] doing with her life?" during overtime of an Alabama-Georgia game.

In July 2009, ESPN announced that Patrick would begin calling Saturday afternoon ESPN/ABC college football for the 2009 college football season, which he did through 2017.

In addition, Patrick called men's and women's college basketball, including the NCAA Women's Division I Basketball Championship from 1996 through 2009 and the College World Series in Omaha, Nebraska from 2003 until 2014, as well as several NFL playoff games for ABC Sports while the network held the Monday Night Football television package, including the Music City Miracle.

On February 21, 2018, Patrick retired from ESPN after 35 years with the network. His last event was the AutoZone Liberty Bowl on December 30, 2017.

== Non ESPN-related assignments ==
Patrick was the play-by-play man for MVP 06: NCAA Baseball as well as MVP 07: NCAA Baseball.

For 2015, 2016 and 2017, Patrick did play-by-play for the Cleveland Browns preseason football games.

== Personal life and death ==
Patrick was inducted into the Jacksonville University Hall of Fame in 2009.

Patrick resided in northern Virginia with his wife, Janet.

On April 20, 2025, Patrick died while in Fairfax, Virginia, at the age of 80.

Preceded by None	NFL play-by-play broadcaster on Sunday Night Football; 1987–2005	Succeeded by Al Michaels
Preceded by Ron Franklin	ESPN play-by-play broadcaster on Saturday Night College Football Primetime; 2006–2008	Succeeded by Brad Nessler
Preceded by Sean McDonough	play-by-play announcer, NCAA Division I Women's Basketball Championship; 1996–2009	Succeeded by Dave O'Brien
