= MVP Baseball 2005 =

2005 video game

- North American cover art with Manny Ramirez
- Developer: EA Canada
- Publisher: EA Sports
- Series: MVP Baseball
- Platforms: PlayStation 2, Xbox, GameCube, Windows, PlayStation Portable
- Release: NA: February 22, 2005; PlayStation Portable: NA: May 18, 2005
- Genre: Sports
- Modes: Single-player, multiplayer

MVP Baseball 2005 is a 2005 baseball video game developed by EA Canada and published by EA Sports. It features Boston Red Sox left fielder Manny Ramirez on its cover. It is considered by many to be the best baseball video game of all time, and possibly the best sports video game of all time.

The game used full Major League Baseball, Minor League Baseball, and Major League Baseball Players Association licenses. Like the previous installments, the game includes real-life announcers Duane Kuiper and Mike Krukow, who are best known for their roles as the announcers for the San Francisco Giants.

It was published for PlayStation 2, Xbox, GameCube, and Windows, along with a condensed version for the PlayStation Portable. It was the final installment in the MVP Baseball series, which was itself the successor to the Triple Play series. EA Sports lost the rights to produce an MLB video game after Take Two Interactive signed an exclusive deal with MLB for its MLB 2K series. EA Sports pivoted to producing a college baseball series called MVP: NCAA Baseball which had very similar gameplay and graphics but was discontinued after the 2007 edition. Online modding communities have produced versions of the game with updated rosters, stadiums, and graphics.

== Gameplay ==
MVP Baseball 2005 consists of 30 Major League Baseball teams and includes all licensed players within the Major League Baseball Players' Association. Barry Bonds notably does not appear in the game due to his withdrawal from the MLBPA's licensing agreement. His "replacement" is a fictional player named Jon Dowd. Dowd bears no resemblance in appearance to Bonds, but his skills mimic those of Bonds. Similarly, Kevin Millar, who was not a member of the MLBPA due to his crossing the picket line during the 1994–95 Major League Baseball strike, is also absent from the game, replaced by a fictional player named Anthony Friese.

The game features authentic minor league teams and actual minor league players, including double-A and triple-A-level farm teams. Additionally, 2005's instalment includes ball clubs from the High Single-A ranks, providing each MLB team with three levels of minor league farm clubs. Unlockable features include two legends teams, 63 legendary players, 15 classic stadiums, five fantasy parks, and more than 100 retro uniforms. Rosters are current as of January 12, 2005, and the game includes the then-new Washington Nationals, along with their then-temporary home, RFK Stadium. New rosters could be downloaded to the Xbox and PS2 versions via their online play menus.

MVP Baseball 2005 includes an exhibition mode, a manager's mode, two different franchise modes, a scenario editor, and a variety of baseball-themed practice games. In the exhibition mode, players can quickly set up a game against another team, selecting a starting pitcher and adjusting the line-up if needed. The manager mode simulates gameplay based on players' choices before the opening pitch, with outcomes displayed in a running box score rather than visually depicted swings or plays. The scenario editor allows players to adjust 20 different variables, such as the teams involved, inning, count, and base situations.

The most prominent new feature in the game is the "Hitter's Eye" system, which turns the baseball different colors in the pitcher's hand (white for fastballs, red for breaking pitches, green for off-speed pitches, pink for sinkers and orange for knuckleballs) and leaves a trail as the ball flies through the air toward the plate to aid in hitting, which game developers said had been too difficult in previous versions. In addition to the Hitter's Eye, an Owner Mode feature and pitching and hitting Mini-Games were added.

Minor league teams from the California, Carolina, and Florida State Leagues (High A) were added to their respective teams. However, most Minor League rosters are incomplete and feature developer-created replacement players. The game also supported online play, but the servers for the Xbox and PS2 versions were shut down somewhere before August 1, 2006.

== Soundtrack ==
The soundtrack for MVP Baseball 2005 includes nine songs, all by different artists. "We Got the Noise" by Donots is used as the intro music. The game was the first release for four of these songs, from artists ...And You Will Know Us by the Trail of Dead, The Bravery, Hot Hot Heat, and Louis XIV. The soundtrack is widely held as one of the best in-game soundtracks of the 2000s.

== Reception ==
=== Critical response ===
Reception

Aggregate score
Aggregator	Score				
Aggregator	GameCube	PC	PS2	PSP	Xbox
Metacritic	88/100	85/100	87/100	67/100	86/100

Review scores
Publication	Score				
Publication	GameCube	PC	PS2	PSP	Xbox
Computer Gaming World	N/A	4/5	N/A	N/A	N/A
Electronic Gaming Monthly	8.67/10 (Note: Two critics of Electronic Gaming Monthly gave the console versions each a score of 8.5/10, and the other gave them 9/10.)	N/A	8.67/10	N/A	8.67/10
Game Informer	8.5/10	N/A	8.5/10	7/10	8.5/10
GameRevolution	B+	N/A	B+	C−	B+
GameSpot	8.8/10	8.7/10	8.9/10	7.7/10	8.9/10
GameSpy	4/5	N/A	4/5	3/5	4/5
GameTrailers	9/10	9/10	9/10	N/A	9/10
IGN	9.2/10	8.8/10	9.2/10	7.5/10	9.2/10
Nintendo Power	4.5/5	N/A	N/A	N/A	N/A
Nintendo World Report	9/10	N/A	N/A	N/A	N/A
Official U.S. PlayStation Magazine	N/A	N/A	4.5/5	3/5	N/A
Official Xbox Magazine (US)	N/A	N/A	N/A	N/A	9/10
PC Gamer (US)	N/A	85%	N/A	N/A	N/A
X-Play	4/5	N/A	4/5	2/5	4/5

The game received "generally favorable reviews" on all platforms except the PSP version, which received "average" reviews, according to the review aggregation website Metacritic. In Japan, where the PlayStation 2 version was ported for release on July 7, 2005, Famitsu gave it a score of one nine, two eights, and one seven for a total of 32 out of 40. GamePro said that the PlayStation 2 and Xbox versions "[retain] the Gold Glove for controls, but the competition has made up ground." (Note: GamePro gave the PlayStation 2 and Xbox versions each three 4/5 scores for graphics, sound, and fun factor, and 4.5/5 for control.)

GameZone gave the PlayStation 2 and Xbox versions each a score of 9.3 out of 10, with Angelina Sandoval calling the former console version "the most solid and wonderfully addictive ballgame on the PS2. With various improvements and some very neat additions to the game, there's just no denying the fact that this is the closest to baseball gaming heaven we'll come this year"; and Eduardo Zacarias saying of the latter console version, "With great modes, gorgeous graphics and near perfect controls this one will no doubt be the franchise we turn to when we want a baseball game true to the sport itself." Natalie Romano gave the GameCube version 9.2 out of 10, calling it "the deepest, most impressive ballgame that's just too addictive." Michael Lafferty gave the PC version nine out of ten, saying, "You can learn to read pitches, fine-tune the single-player controls to give you more room for error or tighten them up to make each pitch a challenge." Romano later gave the PSP version 8.3 out of 10, saying that it "might not feel like the complete package the console version offers, but it's still one of the most genuinely enjoyable and solid ballgames on the PSP." Computer Games Magazine gave the PC version three-and-a-half stars out of five, saying, "While the AI is good on the field, it's terrible in the front office."

=== Awards ===
The game was given an award for the best sports video game of 2005 from X-Play. It was named by GameSpot as the Best Console Game of February 2005 in Review. The PC version was a finalist for the "Best Sports Game" award at the 12th Annual PC Gamer Awards, which went to Tiger Woods PGA Tour 06. The game held the 98th spot on IGN's reader's choice top 100 games. In May 2013 the game ranked fourth on a "Best sports video games" list by ESPN.

=== Sales ===
By July 2006, the game had sold 1 million units and earned $29 million in the U.S. NextGen ranked it as the 55th highest-selling game launched for the PlayStation 2, Xbox or GameCube between October 2000 and July 2006 in that country. Combined sales of the MVP Baseball games released in the 2000s reached 3.5 million units.

== Legacy ==
After EA lost the license to make MLB video games, EA ended support for the game. Despite this, the game's modding community continues support and releases annually updated rosters and alternative leagues (e.g. MVP Caribe, MVP Mods, etc.). The modding community has remained active even as of the 20th anniversary of the game's release. In addition to the PC modders, eBay users have sold PS2 memory cards containing updated rosters using the game's create-a-player feature which can be loaded into the PS2 version of the game.

== See also ==
- MVP Baseball
- MVP 06: NCAA Baseball
- List of baseball video games
