= SMB3 =

SMB3 may refer to:

- Server Message Block version 3, a network protocol in computing
- Super Mario Bros. 3, a 1988 video game
- Super Mega Baseball 3, an entry in the Super Mega Baseball video game series
