= Taping (disambiguation) =

Taping, or athletic taping, is use of tape in order to maintain a stable position of bones and muscles during athletic activity.

Taping may also refer to:

- Taping River, a river in Yunan province of China and northern Myanmar (Burma)
- Taping, Ramgarh, a census town in Jharhand, India
- Taping the Radio, third studio album by New Zealand punk rock band Steriogram
- Taping knife, a drywall tool with a wide blade
- Taping Coils, a short film collected in Westinghouse Works, 1904
