= Taping the Radio =

Studio album by Steriogram
- Released: September 21, 2010
- Genre: Punk rock, indie rock, alternative rock, indie punk, hardcore punk
- Length: 32:04
- Label: Bedroom Empire
- Producer: Bradley Hanan Carter; Brandon Friesen; Steriogram

Steriogram chronology
This Is Not the Target Market (2007)	Taping the Radio (2010)

Singles from Taping the Radio
- 1. "Ready for Action" Released: 8 May 2010; 2. "Moving On" Released: 20 September 2010; 3. "Skinny Runt Revolution" Released: 10 December 2010; 4. "No Ordinary Man" Released: 10 December 2010

Taping the Radio is the third and final studio album by New Zealand punk rock band Steriogram, released on September 21, 2010, by Bedroom Empire.

== Track listing ==
1. "Shamoe" – 03:38
2. "Skinny Runt Revolution" – 02:32
3. "Taping The Radio" – 03:43
4. "Ready For Action" – 02:31
5. "Kevvo" – 02:12
6. "No Ordinary Man" – 03:29
7. "Moving On" – 02:58
8. "White Trash" – 03:28*
9. "Whiskey" – 02:47
10. "Texas Beauties" – 02:27
11. "Two Day Hangover" – 02:46

*Appears on Schmack!

== Personnel ==
- Tyson Kennedy - lead vocals
- Tim Youngson - rhythm guitar and backing vocals
- Brad Carter - co-lead vocals and lead guitar
- Jared Wrennall - drum kit and backing vocals
- Jake Adams - bass guitar and backing vocals
