= NCAA Division I college baseball team statistics =

List of collegiate baseball team statistics

The following is a list of National Collegiate Athletic Association (NCAA) Division I college baseball team statistics as of the conclusion of the 2024 season, including all-time number of wins, losses, and ties; number of seasons played; and percent of games won.

This list includes record as a senior college only, and only teams with 25 or more seasons in Division I included.

== Winningest Baseball Programs as of Conclusion of 2024 Season ==
Rank (pct.)	Rank (wins)	Team	Seasons	W	L	T	Pct.
1	2	Texas	128	3,701	1,421	31	.721
2	5	Florida State	77	3,073	1,210	11	.717
3	17	Miami (Florida)	74	2,790	1,200	18	.698
4	13	Oklahoma State	113	2,831	1,447	6	.662
5	9	Arizona State	113	3,033	1,571	8	.658
6		East Carolina	76	2,167	1,138	12	.655
7		Oral Roberts	59	2,089	1,117	4	.651
8	1	Fordham	164	4,605	2,485	49	.648
9	10	Arizona	119	3,024	1,653	23	.646
10		Coastal Carolina	49	1,769	967	3	.646
11	50	Wichita State	88	2,340	1,280	9	.646
12	6	North Carolina	135	3,043	1,664	37	.645
13		St. John's (New York)	105	2,269	1,250	12	.644
14	7	Clemson	127	3,039	1,685	30	.642
15	11	Texas A&M	122	2,913	1,620	43	.641
16		Cal State Fullerton	59	2,205	1,286	14	.631
17	12	Mississippi State	135	2,853	1,682	28	.628
18	4	Michigan	151	3,091	1,834	37	.627
19	20	Oklahoma	119	2,770	1,645	12	.627
20		South Alabama	60	2,019	1,204	3	.626
21	8	Southern California	130	3,034	1,824	30	.624
22	32	North Carolina State	119	2,553	1,533	27	.624
23		Florida Atlantic	44	1,556	938	9	.623
24	18	South Carolina	132	2,786	1,686	17	.623
27	41	Arkansas	102	2,436	1,477	6	.622
25	15	LSU	129	2,816	1,713	7	.622
29	31	Oregon State	115	2,597	1,574	18	.622
28	19	Florida	110	2,770	1,697	24	.619
30	23	Fresno State	96	2,751	1,691	9	.619
26		Jacksonville State	74	1,913	1,190	2	.616
31	3	Stanford	131	3,108	1,936	35	.615
33	16	Alabama	131	2,818	1,758	25	.615
32	47	Central Michigan	117	2,363	1,494	18	.612
34		Troy	71	1,902	1,206	3	.612
35	27	Notre Dame	132	2,661	1,697	21	.610
36		Missouri State	61	1,790	1,159	1	.607
37		BYU	93	2,186	1,416	13	.607
38	28	Georgia Tech	126	2,640	1,703	26	.607
39	21	Illinois	145	2,764	1,806	39	.604
40	24	Minnesota	136	2,733	1,785	25	.604
41		Georgia Southern	81	2,337	1,543	5	.602
42		Seton Hall	139	2,256	1,492	25	.601
43	48	Auburn	104	2,362	1,578	12	.599
44		College of Charleston	38	1,118	748	5	.599
45		UCF	52	1,748	1,174	10	.598
46		Navy	129	2,103	1,414	39	.597
47	25	Ohio State	141	2,732	1,834	41	.597
48		Delaware	134	2,233	1,509	27	.596
48		Southern	71	1,525	1,036	4	.595
50	14	Washington State	129	2,822	1,928	9	.594
	22	California	133	2,757	2,098	21	.568
	26	UCLA	105	2,677	2,162	25	.553
	29	San Diego St.	92	2,617	1,813	38	.590
	30	Harvard	156	2,601	1,889	35	.579
	33	Vanderbilt	135	2,547	1,863	36	.577
	34	Virginia	136	2,543	1,861	41	.577
	35	Missouri	128	2,476	1,713	21	.590
	36	Michigan State	140	2,476	2,046	28	.547
	37	Yale	159	2,470	2,258	42	.522
	38	Georgia	121	2,462	1,896	24	.565
	39	Indiana	129	2,456	1,921	25	.561
	40	TCU	127	2,449	1,791	25	.577
	42	Baylor	120	2,436	1,824	12	.572
	43	Santa Clara	133	2,428	2,157	33	.529
	44	Ole Miss	124	2,377	1,705	20	.582
	45	Iowa	134	2,366	1,958	28	.547
	46	Nebraska	118	2,365	1,721	16	.578
	49	West Virginia	130	2,354	1,670	19	.585

== See also ==
- Baseball statistics
- NCAA Division I Baseball Championship
