= Waterdown (band) =

German hardcore band

- Origin: Osnabrück, Lower Saxony, Germany
- Genres: Post-hardcore; hardcore punk; emo; metalcore
- Years active: 1999–2012
- Labels: Victory; Uncle M; Blacktop; Two Friends
- Past members: Axel Pralat; Michael "Zacken" Janczack; Phillip Meyer; Christian Kruse; Holger Behrens; Ingo Rieser; Marcell Bischoff; Claus Wilgenbusch; Jörg Schwoeppe

Waterdown was a German post-hardcore band from Osnabrück, active from 1999 to 2012.

== History ==
Waterdown emerged onto the scene in 1999 under the formation of Axel Pralat (guitar), Marcel Bischoff (vocals), Jörg Schwoeppe (drums), Christian Kruse (bass), Holger Behrens (guitar), and Ingo Rieser (vocals).

The band was signed to Victory Records up until the mid-2000s. The band's first release was Never Kill the Boy on the First Date, which put them on the map in both Europe and America. This was followed by their second release The Files You Have on Me. They then toured until one of their vocalists (Bischoff) left the group in 2004. Eventually they found their current singer, Michael "Zacken" Janczak. After acquiring Janczak, production on their following album All Riot began immediately. The album was released on January 24, 2006. Sometime between the release of All Riot and the EP Powersnake, Ingo Rieser left the ensemble. The band put out the EP Powersnake and a final record Into the Flames, until they called it quits in 2012. Their song "Repeater" off of their 2006 album "All Riot" was featured in the 2006 baseball game MVP 06: NCAA Baseball.

== Members ==
- Axel Pralat – guitar/backing vocals (1999–2002, 2003–2012)
- Michael "Zacken" Janczak – lead vocals (2004–2012)
- Philipp Meyer – drums (2002–2012)
- Christian Kruse – bass/backing vocals (1999–2012)
- Holger Behrens – guitar (1999–2012)
- Ingo Rieser – co-lead vocals (1999–?)
- Marcel Bischoff – lead vocals (1999–2004)
- Claus Wilgenbusch – guitar (2002)
- Jörg Schwoeppe – drums (1999–2002)

== Discography ==
=== Studio albums ===
- Never Kill the Boy on the First Date (2001, Victory)
- The Files You Have on Me (2003, Victory)
- All Riot (2006, Victory)
- Into the Flames (2012, Uncle M)

=== EPs ===
- Draw a Smiling Face (2000, Two Friends Recordings)
- Powersnake (2008, Blacktop)
