= Into the Flames (album) =

Studio album by Waterdown
- Released: March 23, 2012
- Recorded: 2011–2012
- Genres: Post-hardcore, hardcore punk, metalcore, alternative rock
- Length: 33:13; 39:37 (Digital edition)
- Labels: Uncle M, Cargo Records
- Producer: Philipp Meyer

Waterdown chronology
| All Riot (2006) | Into the Flames (2012) |

Into the Flames is the fourth and final studio album by German post-hardcore band Waterdown. It was released on March 23, 2012, through Uncle M and Cargo Records. The album was the band's first full-length release since All Riot (2006) and was released shortly before Waterdown disbanded in 2012.

== Background ==
Following the release of All Riot in 2006 and the Powersnake EP in 2008, Waterdown spent several years without a record label. The band continued writing, recording and performing, although the intervals between releases and shows became longer.

In January 2012, Waterdown announced that they would end the band after thirteen years. The group stated that Into the Flames would be their final album and announced a series of farewell concerts in Germany in April and May 2012.

The band described the album as its final statement under the Waterdown name. In an interview with Ox-Fanzine, members Christian Kruse, Holger Behrens, Axel Pralat, Philipp Meyer and Michael Janczak said that the band felt it had said what it wanted to say with Waterdown and that they intended to continue making music under a different name.

== Recording and production ==
Into the Flames was produced by drummer Philipp Meyer. The album was recorded by the band's final lineup of Michael Janczak, Axel Pralat, Christian Kruse, Holger Behrens and Philipp Meyer.

The album also features former vocalist Ingo Rieser on the song "Saving Private Honesty".

Two songs from the album's recording sessions were initially released as demos in 2007. Waterdown later stated that "Saving Private Honesty" and "From The King's Dead Hands" were recorded during 2006–2007; the latter was subsequently released as a bonus track on Into the Flames.

== Music and style ==
The album continued Waterdown's combination of hardcore, post-hardcore and melodic rock while incorporating a larger amount of slower and more atmospheric material than some of the band's earlier releases.

Contemporary reviews noted the contrast between aggressive shouted vocals, melodic guitar passages and quieter songs. Metal1.info classified the album as hardcore/screamo and highlighted the contrast between its heavier opening tracks and its more melodic material.

Vampster described the album as a deliberately diverse release, noting that its eight main songs differed substantially from one another and that the record moved between harder hardcore material and quieter rock-oriented songs.

== Release ==
Into the Flames was released on March 23, 2012, by Uncle M and distributed by Cargo Records.

The standard vinyl edition contains eight tracks. The vinyl edition was limited to 500 individually numbered copies, with 100 copies included in a box set containing additional material such as a DVD, videos, unreleased demos, photographs, a poster and other items.

The digital edition contains additional material. The digital release listed by Amazon contains ten tracks, including "No Dignity No Doubt" and "From the King's Dead Hands", with the latter identified as a bonus track.

The vinyl and digital editions therefore differ in both track count and running time.

== Critical reception ==
Contemporary reviews gave the album mixed-to-positive assessments while emphasizing its diversity and its position as Waterdown's final release.

Metal1.info gave the album a rating of 8 out of 10, describing it as an emotional and varied post-hardcore record. The review highlighted "We Are Not the Children", "Saving Private Honesty", "Dragged Through the Dirt" and "Homecoming", while noting the album's movement between aggressive and quieter material.

Vampster gave the album a more critical assessment, praising the band's willingness to broaden its sound and singling out "Saving Private Honesty" and "Dragged Through the Dirt", while criticizing the consistency of the songwriting across the album.

Hell-Driver Magazine classified the album as screamo and gave it a rating of 4 out of 7.

== Final release and breakup ==
Into the Flames was Waterdown's final studio album. The band announced its breakup in January 2012 and subsequently played its final concerts in April and May of that year.

The band's farewell announcement stated that after thirteen years and more than 600 shows, the members considered their work under the Waterdown name complete. The members also indicated that they planned to continue making music together under a different band name.

The album therefore represents the final studio recording released under the Waterdown name.

== Track listing ==
=== Standard edition ===
All tracks are written by Waterdown unless otherwise noted.

| No. | Title | Length |
|---|---|---|
| 1. | "Get What You Give" | 3:26 |
| 2. | "We Are Not the Children" | 5:22 |
| 3. | "Into the Flames" | 4:04 |
| 4. | "Saving Private Honesty" | 3:07 |
| 5. | "Anchor Lost" | 3:52 |
| 6. | "Dragged Through the Dirt" | 5:50 |
| 7. | "Kiss It Goodbye, Watch It Die" | 3:54 |
| 8. | "Homecoming" | 3:38 |
| Total length: | | 33:13 |

The standard eight-track sequence is documented by contemporary reviews of the vinyl edition.

"Saving Private Honesty" features former Waterdown vocalist Ingo Rieser.

=== Digital edition ===
| No. | Title | Length |
|---|---|---|
| 1. | "Get What You Give" | 3:26 |
| 2. | "We Are Not the Children" | 5:22 |
| 3. | "Into the Flames" | 4:04 |
| 4. | "Saving Private Honesty" | 3:07 |
| 5. | "Anchor Lost" | 3:52 |
| 6. | "Dragged Through the Dirt" | 5:50 |
| 7. | "Kiss It Goodbye, Watch It Die" | 3:54 |
| 8. | "Homecoming" | 3:38 |
| 9. | "No Dignity No Doubt" | 3:05 |
| 10. | "From the King's Dead Hands" (Bonus track) | 3:19 |
| Total length: | | 39:37 |

The digital edition lists "No Dignity No Doubt" as a ninth track and "From the King's Dead Hands" as a bonus track.

"From the King's Dead Hands" originated from Waterdown's 2006–2007 demo recordings and was later included as a bonus track on Into the Flames.

== Personnel ==
=== Waterdown ===
- Michael "Zacken" Janczak – vocals
- Axel Pralat – guitar, vocals
- Holger Behrens – guitar
- Christian Kruse – bass, vocals
- Philipp Meyer – drums, producer

=== Additional musician ===
- Ingo Rieser – guest vocals on "Saving Private Honesty"
