= Sing the Night Away =

EP by Steriogram
- Released: November 3, 2001
- Genres: Punk rock, rap punk, alternative rock, indie punk
- Length: 24:04 (Standard edition)
- Label: Capitol Records
- Producers: Mike Gibson and Brad Carter

Steriogram chronology
Soccerstar (1999)	Sing the Night Away (2001)	Schmack! (2004)

Singles from Sing the Night Away
- 1. "Sing the Night Away" Released: 2001; 2. "White Trash" Released: 2001

Sing the Night Away is a five track EP (plus the bonus track) by New Zealand punk band Steriogram. It was released at concerts during the 2002 NZ Schools Tour. A music video was made for the song "Sing The Night Away" although none of these tracks made their debut album Schmack!. "Sing the Night Away", "Free", and "Big Lady Loving" featured on singles from the album Schmack!, and "White Trash (DLT remix)" features on the Schmack! 2005 Special Tour Edition. West Side! is the only song not to feature on another album or single.

== Track listing ==
1. "Sing the Night Away"
2. "Free"
3. "Big Lady Loving"
4. "White Trash (DLT remix)"
5. "West Side!"

Bonus Track
No.	Title	Length
6.	"White Trash (Released on Schmack!)"	3:23
Total length:		27:27

== Personnel ==
- Tyson Kennedy – lead vocals
- Brad Carter – co-lead vocals and lead guitar
- Tim Youngson – rhythm guitar and backing vocals
- Jake Adams – bass guitar and backing vocals
- Jared Wrennall – drum kit and backing vocals
