= Soccerstar =

EP by Steriogram
- Released: December 1999
- Recorded: Chapel Studios, Auckland. December 1999
- Genre: Punk rock
- Length: 10:24 (Standard edition)
- Label: Capitol
- Producer: Steriogram

Steriogram chronology
Soccerstar (1999)	Sing the Night Away (2001)

Singles from Soccerstar
- 1. "Soccerstar" Released: November 11, 1999

Soccerstar is the debut EP by the New Zealand punk band Steriogram, released through Capitol Records on November 11, 1999. The EP is considered to be the first mini-album of a series, but this has not been confirmed. Steriogram announced that their next EP would be released in early 2001. The album is not commonly remembered and most of the songs can be bought on unknown websites. A music video was made for the single "Soccerstar".

== Track listing ==
1. "Chiqboom" – 03:51
2. "Soccerstar" – 03:50
3. "Aeroplane" – 03:57

== Personnel ==
- Brad Carter - lead vocals, lead guitar
- Tim Youngson - rhythm guitar, backing vocals
- Jake Adams - bass guitar, backing vocals
- Tyson Kennedy - drums, backing vocals
