= This Is Not the Target Market =

Studio album by Steriogram
- Released: February 12, 2007
- Genres: Punk rock, hardcore punk, alternative rock, alternative metal, nu metal, punk metal
- Length: 26:20
- Label: Toshiba EMI
- Producer: Steriogram

Steriogram chronology
Schmack! (2004)	This Is Not the Target Market (2007)	Taping the Radio (2010)

Singles from This Is Not the Target Market
- 1. "Just Like You" Released: 5 October 2006; 2. "Own Way Home" Released: 9 April 2007; 3. "Built On Lies (Gangster)" Released: 12 May 2009

This Is Not the Target Market is the second album by New Zealand punk band Steriogram, released on February 12, 2007 by Toshiba EMI. It was their first independent release after leaving major label Capitol Records. The song "Get Up" is used in the video game, WWE SmackDown vs. Raw 2009.

== Track listing ==
1. "Get Up" – 2:45
2. "Talk About It" – 2:32
3. "Own Way Home" – 2:42
4. "Sitting Above Me" – 2:36
5. "Wasted" – 2:41
6. "Satan Is a Lady" – 3:03
7. "Just Like You" – 2:22
8. "Muchacha" – 3:01
9. "Built on Lies (Gangster)" – 2:34
10. "Kare Kare" – 3:24

Bonus tracks

11. "Send Me Out – 2:29
12. "Walkie Talkie Man (live)" – 2:50
13. "Satan Is a Lady (live)" – 3:10
14. "Roadtrip (live)" – 7:32

== Personnel ==
- Tyson Kennedy - lead vocals
- Brad Carter - co-lead vocals and lead guitar
- Tim Youngson - rhythm guitar and backing vocals
- Jake Adams - bass guitar and backing vocals
- Jared Wrennall - drum kit and backing vocals

== Release history ==
Year	Type	Label	Catalog #
2007	CD	Toshiba EMI	66651
2007	CD	Short Stack	001
2007	CD	Rock Ridge	61148
