= Super Mega Baseball =

Video game series

Super Mega Baseball is a baseball video game series developed by Metalhead Software in Victoria, BC, Canada. There have been four iterations to date; the first three were self-published while Metalhead was independent, while the fourth was published by EA Sports after their purchase of the studio in May 2021.

== Super Mega Baseball ==
Super Mega Baseball
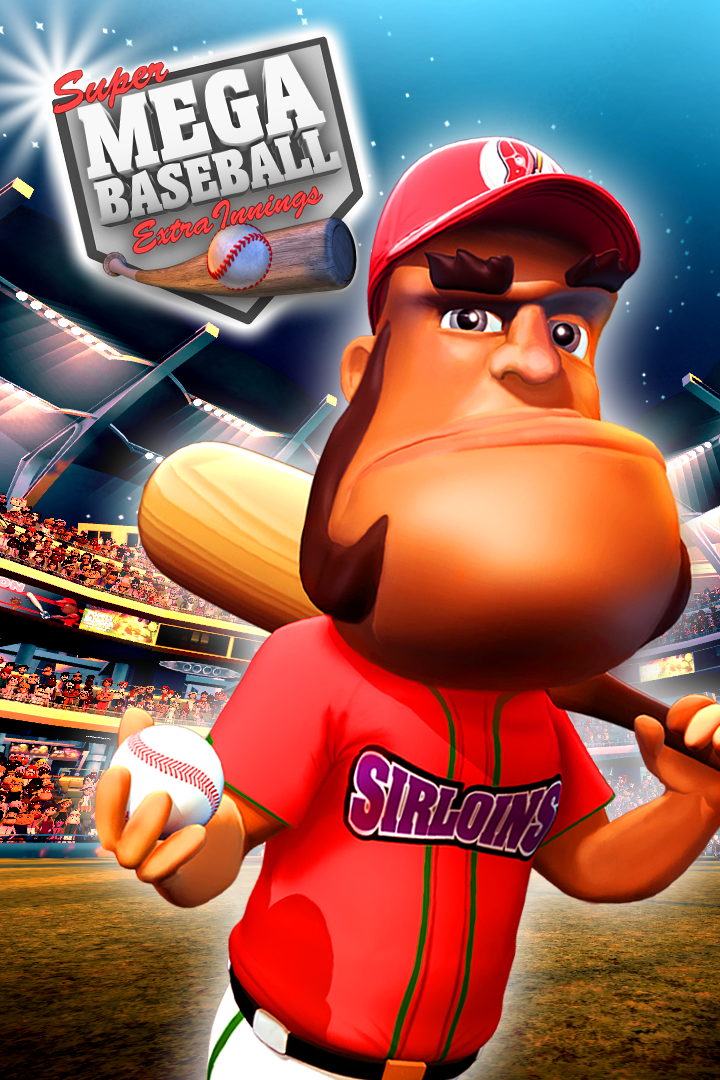
- Developer: Metalhead Software (Note: Nvidia Lightspeed Studios developed the Nvidia Shield version.)
- Publisher: Metalhead Software
- Engine: PhyreEngine
- Platforms: Microsoft Windows; PlayStation 3 PlayStation 4 Xbox One; Shield Android TV
- Release: PlayStation 3, PlayStation 4: NA: December 16, 2014; EU: April 1, 2015; Xbox One: WW: August 14, 2015; Steam: WW: August 21, 2015; Shield Android TV: WW: March 24, 2016
- Genre: Sports
- Modes: Single-player, multiplayer

=== History ===
The first game, Super Mega Baseball, was released on December 16, 2014 as a PlayStation 3 and PlayStation 4 cross-buy title on the U.S. PlayStation Store. It was released on the European PlayStation Store on April 1, 2015.

An updated version called Super Mega Baseball: Extra Innings was released on Xbox One on August 14, 2015 and it was released on Steam for PC on August 21, 2015. The extra features from this version were released as free DLC for the PlayStation 3 and PlayStation 4 in 2016. Super Mega Baseball: Extra Innings was released on Shield Android TV on March 24, 2016.

Super Mega Baseball was a critical success, earning an average score of 85/100 on Metacritic, based on 14 reviews. Gaming-Age gave the game a grade of "A," saying that "Because really, Super Mega Baseball is the sort of fun, easy to pick up diversion that video game baseball was at the very beginning of its lifespan — and if it's as great as it is here, there's every reason to believe it can still fulfill that function." IGN, meanwhile, gave the game an 8.1 "Great" rating, praising the game's sense of humor and easy pick-up-and-play gameplay, but criticising its presentation. It was named "Sports Game of the Year" by Polygon.

=== Features ===
Super Mega Baseball supports 1 – 4 players in local competitive or co-operative play. Primary game modes include Exhibition and Season. The game has 216 customizable players and 24 umpires, as well as four different ballparks (6 in the Super Mega Baseball: Extra Innings version).

== Super Mega Baseball 2 ==
Super Mega Baseball 2
- Developer: Metalhead Software
- Publisher: Metalhead Software
- Platforms: Microsoft Windows; PlayStation 4 Xbox One; Nintendo Switch
- Release: Windows, PlayStation 4, Xbox One; May 1, 2018; Nintendo Switch; July 25, 2019
- Genre: Sports
- Modes: Single-player, multiplayer

=== History ===
Developer Metalhead Software announced the second installment in the series, Super Mega Baseball 2, on September 28, 2016. Super Mega Baseball 2 was released in 2018 as it had been delayed, and includes updated art, online multiplayer, and full customization. On April 20, 2018, Metalhead Software announced that the game would be released on May 1, 2018. It released into Xbox One's Games with Gold for the month of May 2018.

Super Mega Baseball 2: Ultimate Edition was then announced to be released on July 25, 2019 on Nintendo Switch. "Metalhead Software is bringing the critically acclaimed baseball game Super Mega Baseball 2 to the Nintendo Switch for the first time as Super Mega Baseball 2: Ultimate Edition, which includes the complete set of Super Mega Baseball 2 content (game, DLC), fully featured online play, and runs at 60 fps in both docked and handheld modes" - Operation Sports.

Super Mega Baseball 2 earned an 81 Metacritic score for Xbox One based on 21 reviews. Forbes gave it an 8.6/10 saying "While it's not a full-fledged AAA title, SMB 2 blurs the lines with its fantastic gameplay and mode depth." Gaming Age gave it an A−, saying "There's a good argument to be made that it's the best baseball game of 2018."

=== Features ===
Super Mega Baseball 2 supports 1 - 4 players in local co-op or online multiplayer. Primary game modes include Exhibition, Season, Elimination, and Pennant Race. Pennant Race is the 1v1 online matchmaking mode, while the remaining modes can be played locally or online in arranged games. Super Mega Baseball 2 also has three DLC packs containing additional customization content: Wild Team Customization Pack, Wicked Team Customization Pack, Bold Player Customization Pack. In season mode, it has deep, multi-season tracking of stats.

All console versions of the game can be matched with one another in the online multiplayer (Pennant Race) mode.

=== Awards ===
The game won the award for "Game, Franchise Sports" at the National Academy of Video Game Trade Reviewers Awards.

== Super Mega Baseball 3 ==
Super Mega Baseball 3
- Developer: Metalhead Software
- Publisher: Metalhead Software
- Platforms: Microsoft Windows; Nintendo Switch; PlayStation 4 Xbox One; Amazon Luna
- Release: Windows, Switch, PlayStation 4, Xbox One; May 13, 2020; Amazon Luna; January 11, 2021
- Genre: Sports
- Modes: Single-player, multiplayer

=== History ===
Metalhead Software announced the launch of their latest game in the baseball series, Super Mega Baseball 3, on March 11, 2020. The game was set for release in April 2020, but Metalhead announced on April 23, 2020 that due to industry-wide delays from COVID-19, the release date was revised to May 13, 2020. New features include an all-new Franchise mode, and importation of custom teams from Super Mega Baseball 2.

Super Mega Baseball 3 was released on May 13, 2020 on Microsoft Windows, Nintendo Switch, Xbox One, and PlayStation 4, and on January 11, 2021 for Amazon Luna. It earned an 83 Metacritic score for Xbox One based on 12 critic reviews with one critic saying “The SMB series has become one of the most consistent, and well-developed sports gaming franchises available.” Super Mega Baseball 3 also earned an 87 score on Metacritic for Switch based on 8 critic reviews with another critic saying “Super Mega Baseball 3 is our new all-time leader for the title of the greatest baseball video game I have ever played.”

=== Features ===
Super Mega Baseball 3 features Exhibition, Pennant Race, Season and Elimination modes, as well as a brand-new Franchise mode. The Franchise mode includes such features as signing free agents and Player Development. In a post-launch update, Metalhead also released a brand-new cross-platform online mode for Super Mega Baseball 3 called Online Leagues. The mode was released on September 29 and allows users to create and join custom leagues online with friends. Leagues can range from casual to competitive play and each league can have up to 32 players.

== Super Mega Baseball 4 ==
Super Mega Baseball 4 was announced on May 2, 2023 for release on June 2, 2023. Its pre-orders began on May 30, 2023. Super Mega Baseball 4 is the first entry in the series published by EA Sports and the first baseball game since MVP 07: NCAA Baseball.
