= Schmack! =

Studio album by Steriogram
- Released: February 29, 2004
- Studio: Henson Recording Studios (Los Angeles, CA)
- Genre: Punk rock; pop-punk; rapcore; alternative rock
- Length: 38:23
- Label: Capitol
- Producer: David Kahne

Steriogram chronology
Sing the Night Away (2001)	Schmack! (2004)	This Is Not the Target Market (2007)

Singles from Schmack!
- 1. "Walkie Talkie Man" Released: 29 February 2004; 2. "Go" Released: 29 October 2004; 3. "White Trash" Released: 2001 on "Sing the Night Away" re-recorded and re-released on 23 June 2006; 4. "Tsunami" Released: 4 July 2006; 5. "Road Trip" Released: 4 July 2006; 6. "On and On" Released: 4 July 2006; 7. "Be Good to Me" Released: 9 August 2006

Alternative Cover
- 2005 Special Tour Edition

Schmack! is the debut studio album by New Zealand rock band Steriogram, released on 29 February 2004 by Capitol Records. The album was recorded In Henson Recording Studios in Los Angeles, California. The album was re-released as a tour edition in 2005. The song "Walkie Talkie Man" featured on an Apple iPod ad and a number of films and video games, and its video clip was nominated for a Grammy and four MTV music awards.

To date more than 250,000 copies of the album have been sold.

One song, "White Trash", had previously been released as a single in 2000. In addition to "Walkie Talkie Man", four others were released as singles: "Roadtrip", "Go", "Tsunami" and "On and On". "Walkie Talkie Man" debuted at #19 on the UK Singles Chart and reached #14 on the New Zealand chart. "Go" peaked at #28 in the New Zealand RIANZ Chart. The promo release of "Go" had an instrumental of "Go" on the b-side, and the UK release had "Free".

Professional ratings
Review scores
Source	Rating
AllMusic	2.5/5 stars
Classic Rock	4/5 stars
Entertainment Weekly	B+
Evening Standard	3/5 stars
Spin	B

== Critical reception ==
Schmack! received generally mixed-to-positive reviews from contemporary music critics, who highlighted its energetic, trend-conscious fusion of genres while noting an abundance of formulaic track structures.

AllMusic critic Johnny Loftus called the album a "clattering, campy, gloriously in-the-moment scrapheap of riffs and attitude," basically labeling them as New Zealand's version of Sum 41. He pointed out that the band was really good at slapping "outsized metal riffs and impossibly generic white-boy raps onto a punk-pop framework." That said, he warned that it’s best taken in small doses, admitting the record "works in two-minute doses, anyway" and is dragged down by its "fair share of useless filler."

Loftus praised the production work of David Kahne, noting that he effectively tempered the potentially polarizing vocal performance of co-vocalist Tyson Kennedy. According to Loftus, Kahne "cleverly plays [Kennedy's] presence off the more traditional chorus vocals of Brad Carter." Kennedy's rapid-fire delivery on the hit single "Walkie Talkie Man" was described as a "snarky patter" resembling "Scrappy-Doo with Red Bull wings." While Loftus dismissed the track's composition as "paint-by-numbers modern rock" relies entirely on its central guitar hook, he credited Kahne's production for its success.

The album's stylistic shifts were compared to "early, freakout period Red Hot Chili Peppers" updated for an "attention-span-less new millennium," specifically citing the "blathering funk metal" of the title track and the cartoonish nature of "Fat and Proud." Loftus designated "White Trash" as the album's definitive "bomb track," describing it as an ironic, triumphant anthem of low culture suited for the "pre-Joe Dirt era." Concluding his assessment, Loftus wrote that the track encapsulated the "disposable yet lovable dichotomy of Steriogram," providing a boost to their otherwise "suspect staying power."

Michelle Kleinsak of Entertainment Weekly highlighted the album's lighthearted approach to an "often overwrought genre," noting that "there's no danger of this New Zealand rap-rock quintet taking itself too seriously." Kleinsak described the record as a "giddy debut" characterized by a "schizo blend of vintage AC/DC riffs, bratty early-Beasties humor, and Weezerish harmonies," specifically pointing to the tracks "White Trash" and "Fat & Proud" as prime examples of the band's cheeky humor. While she singled out the hyperactive lead single "Walkie Talkie Man" as the album's peak of "garage-rock cool," she ultimately concluded that the project remained "a refreshing schmack upside the head."

== Track listing ==
All songs written by Tyson Kennedy, Tim Youngson, Bradley Carter, Jacob Adams, Jared Wrenell)

=== 2004 release ===
1. "Roadtrip" - 2:59
2. "Walkie Talkie Man" - 2:13
3. "Schmack!" - 2:25
4. "Was the Day" - 2:13
5. "White Trash" - 3:44
6. "In the City" - 2:41
7. "Go" - 2:56
8. "Fat and Proud" - 3:27
9. "Tsunami" - 3:01
10. "Wind It Up" - 3:14
11. "Be Good to Me" - 2:59
12. "On and On" - 3:59

=== Tour edition (2005) bonus tracks ===
13. "Free"
14. "White Trash (DLT Remix)"
15. "Big Lady Lovin"
16. "Back in Black"

== Personnel ==
- Tyson Kennedy - lead vocals
- Brad Carter - co-lead vocals, lead guitar
- Tim Youngson - rhythm guitar, backing vocals
- Jake Adams - bass guitar, backing vocals
- Jared Wrennall - drums, backing vocals

== Charts ==
=== Weekly charts ===
Chart (2004)	Peak position
New Zealand Albums (RMNZ)	3

=== Year-end charts ===
Chart (2004)	Position
New Zealand Albums (RMNZ)	50

== Certifications ==
Region	Certification	Certified units/sales
New Zealand (RMNZ)	Platinum	15,000^{^}
^{^} Shipments figures based on certification alone.
