= Walkie Talkie Man =

2004 single by Steriogram

- New Zealand and Australian CD single artwork

Single by Steriogram

from the album Schmack!
- Released: 2004
- Genre: Pop-punk; rap rock
- Length: 2:13
- Label: Capitol
- Songwriter: Steriogram
- Producer: David Kahne

Steriogram singles chronology
"White Trash" (2001)	"Walkie Talkie Man" (2004)	"Roadtrip" (2004)

Music video
- "Walkie Talkie Man" on YouTube

"Walkie Talkie Man" is a song by New Zealand punk rock band Steriogram, released in 2004 as the official lead single from their debut studio album, Schmack! (although "White Trash" was released in 2001, it was not promoted as a single from the album). "Walkie Talkie Man" is widely recognised as bringing Steriogram the majority of their popularity, especially after it was used as the background music to an advert by Apple for the iPod. The song reached number 14 in New Zealand and peaked at number 19 on the UK Singles Chart.

== Music video ==
The music video for "Walkie Talkie Man" was directed by Michel Gondry, and features scenes of children working as studio staff and knitting instruments and equipment, and the band is terrorized by a giant hand made of wool which grabs singer Tyson Kennedy and tears him in half, showing that his insides are also made of wool. The children save him by unraveling the threads that compose the giant and sewing his lower body back in place — but it is sewn backwards and Kennedy ends the video with his legs turned back to the camera, unlike his upper body. Brad Carter's woollen guitar bears the words "New Zealand". The video is available on the DVD compilation Michel Gondry 2: More Videos (Before and After DVD 1). The music video was nominated for a Grammy Award for Best Short Form Music Video in 2005 and four Video Music Awards.

== Personnel ==
- Tyson Kennedy – lead vocals
- Brad Carter – co-lead vocals and lead guitar
- Tim Youngson – rhythm guitar and backing vocals
- Jake Adams – bass guitar and backing vocals
- Jared Wrennall – drums and backing vocals

== Charts ==
Weekly chart performance for "Walkie Talkie Man"
Chart (2004)	Peak position
Australia (ARIA)	80
New Zealand (Recorded Music NZ)	14
UK Singles (Official Charts)	19

== In popular culture ==
The song was used in the films Robots, Kicking & Screaming, Man of the House and Agent Cody Banks 2: Destination London, as well as the video games MVP Baseball 2004, MLB 2005, Elite Beat Agents and Pump It Up Exceed. It was also used in an Apple promotional video, introducing the AirPort Express and built in iPod integration with BMW automobiles, and the movie trailer Are We There Yet?. It is featured in the Spanish hospital drama series Breathless.
