= MVP Baseball 2004 =

2004 video game

- North American cover art featuring Albert Pujols.
- Developer: EA Canada
- Publisher: EA Sports
- Producer: Brent Nielsen
- Programmer: Dee Jay Randall
- Artists: Ben Brinkman; Terry Coleman; Jon Dowd; Nathan McDonald; Alex Murdoch
- Series: MVP Baseball
- Platforms: Xbox, PlayStation 2, GameCube, Microsoft Windows
- Release: NA: March 9, 2004
- Genre: Sports (baseball)
- Modes: Single-player, multiplayer

MVP Baseball 2004 is a baseball video game developed by EA Canada and published by EA Sports for Xbox, PlayStation 2, GameCube, and Microsoft Windows in 2004. It is the second installment of the MVP Baseball series. Albert Pujols was the cover player for the game.

== Gameplay ==
Building on MVP 2003's first effort, the 2004 edition made major refinements to the game's control and dynasty mode. For the first time in baseball gaming, MVP 2004 was licensed by both the MLB and Minor League Baseball, featuring minor-league teams at the AA & AAA levels.

== Reception ==
The PlayStation 2 and Xbox versions received "universal acclaim", while the GameCube and PC versions received "generally favorable reviews", according to the review aggregation website Metacritic. GamePro said of the game, "It may not be the league-leader in every category, but excellent performances across the board make it the best baseball game of the year." (Note: GamePro gave the console versions each a score of 5/5 for graphics, and two 4.5/5 scores for sound and control. The only difference in the fun factor category is that the PlayStation 2 and Xbox versions each got 5/5, while the GameCube version got 4.5/5.)

The game was named by GameSpot as the Best PlayStation 2 Game of March 2004 in Review, and was nominated for the "Best Traditional Sports Game" award at the website's Best and Worst of 2004 Awards, which went to ESPN NFL 2K5.

Reception

Aggregate score
Aggregator	Score			
Aggregator	GameCube	PC	PS2	Xbox
Metacritic	89/100	82/100	90/100	90/100

Review scores
Publication	Score			
Publication	GameCube	PC	PS2	Xbox
Computer Games Magazine	B+	3/5	B+	B+
Computer Gaming World	N/A	3.5/5	N/A	N/A
Electronic Gaming Monthly	8.33/10 (Note: Two critics of Electronic Gaming Monthly gave the console versions each a score of 8.5/10, and the other gave them 8/10.)	N/A	8.33/10	8.33/10
Game Informer	9.25/10	N/A	9.25/10	9.25/10
GameRevolution	A−	N/A	A−	A−
GameSpot	9/10	8.3/10	9.1/10	9/10
GameSpy	4/5	3/5	4/5	4/5
GameZone	N/A	9/10	9.2/10	N/A
IGN	8.8/10	8.5/10	9/10	9/10
Nintendo Power	4.7/5	N/A	N/A	N/A
Official U.S. PlayStation Magazine	N/A	N/A	4.5/5	N/A
Official Xbox Magazine (US)	N/A	N/A	N/A	9.1/10
PC Gamer (US)	N/A	78%	N/A	N/A
X-Play	4/5	N/A	N/A	N/A
Entertainment Weekly	A−	N/A	A−	A−
The Village Voice	N/A	N/A	N/A	9/10
