= College baseball =

Baseball that is played on the intercollegiate level at institutions of higher education

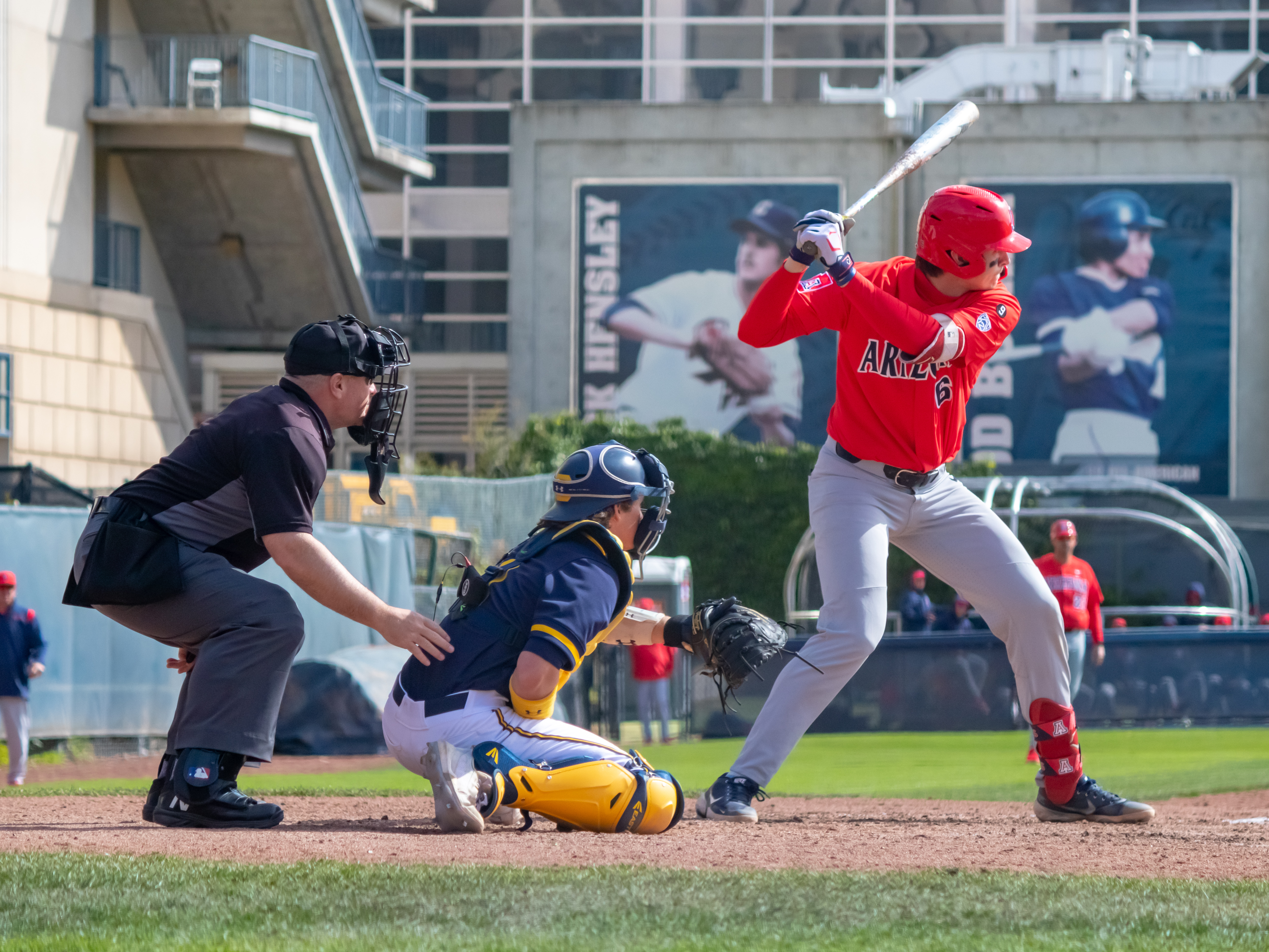
- Daniel Susac (right) batting for the Arizona Wildcats in a game against the California Golden Bears in March 2022
- Governing body: List: United States; CCCAA; NAIA; NCAA; NCCAA; NJCAA; NWAC; USCAA Japan; JUBF
- First played: 1947 (United States); 1952 (Japan)
- Clubs: 301 (in 30 conferences) (NCAA Division I)

Club competitions
- NCAA: Men's College World Series; Division I; Division II; Division III; NAIA: NAIA World Series; JUBF: All Japan University Championship

Audience records
- Single match: 40,106 (San Diego State v Houston) at Petco Park – March 11, 2004

College baseball is baseball played by student-athletes at institutions of higher education. In the United States, college baseball is sanctioned mainly by the National Collegiate Athletic Association (NCAA); in Japan, it is governed by the All Japan University Baseball Federation (JUBF) (全日本大学野球連盟, Zen'nihon daigaku yakyū renmei).

In comparison to American football and basketball, college competition in the United States plays a smaller role in developing professional players, as Minor League Baseball tends to be more extensive, with a greater history of supplying players from the high school level to Major League Baseball (MLB). But many amateur baseball players may choose college, for the sake of physical preparation and a softer transition from the high school level to the minor leagues.

If players opt to enroll at a four-year college, they must complete three years of college to regain professional eligibility, or have turned at least age 21 before starting their third year of college. Players who enroll at junior colleges (i.e., two-year institutions) regain eligibility after one year at that level.

During the most recent NCAA regular season, 301 teams competed at the Division I level in the United States, with top teams progressing through the regular season, various conference tournaments and championship series, and the 2026 NCAA Division I baseball tournament to play for the Division I championship in the 2026 Men's College World Series.

The first College World Series was held in 1947, located in Kalamazoo, Michigan. Today, the MCWS takes place at Charles Schwab Field Omaha, in Omaha, Nebraska. When the Series began, it lasted two or three days and consisted of two or three games. Now the Series stretches to more than a week and can involve as many as 17 games.

== Organization ==
As with most other U.S. intercollegiate sports, competitive college baseball is played under the auspices of the NCAA, the NAIA, the NJCAA, the CCCAA, or the NWAC. The NCAA writes the rules of play, while each sanctioning body supervises season-ending tournaments. The final rounds of the NCAA Division I tournament is known as the Men's College World Series (MCWS); (Note: The event has officially been named "Men's College World Series" since 2008 at the latest, but the NCAA did not start using the word "Men's" in the event branding until 2022.) while each of the three levels of competition sanctioned by the NCAA holds a championship tournament, the "Men's College World Series" branding is reserved strictly for the final round of the Division I tournament. The MCWS takes place in Omaha, Nebraska in June, following the regular season. The playoff bracket for Division I consists of 64 teams, with four teams playing at each of 16 regional sites (in a double-elimination format). The 16 winners advance to the Super Regionals at eight sites, played head-to-head in a best-of-three series. The eight winners then advance to the MCWS, a double-elimination tournament (actually two separate four-team brackets) to determine the two national finalists. The finalists play a best-of-three series to determine the Division I national champion. The most recent Men's College World Series winner is Oklahoma.

== History ==
The first intercollegiate baseball game took place in Pittsfield, Massachusetts, on July 1, 1859, between squads representing Amherst College and Williams College. Amherst won 73–32. This game was one of the last played under an earlier version of the game known as "Massachusetts rules", which prevailed in New England until the "Knickerbocker Rules" (or "New York Rules") developed in the 1840s gradually became accepted. The first ever nine-man team college baseball game under the Knickerbocker Rules still in use today was played in New York on November 3, 1859 between the Fordham Rose Hill Baseball Club of St. John's College (now Fordham University) against The College of St. Francis Xavier, now known as Xavier High School.

The first ever college baseball game televised in the United States took place on May 17, 1939. Princeton University played Columbia University at Columbia's Baker Field in New York City. NBC broadcast the game on its experimental television station, W2XBS, making it the first televised sporting event in American History. Viewers watched Princeton defeat Columbia 2-1 in 10 innings.

June 30, 1945, was an important date in college baseball because it marked the founding of American Baseball Coaches Association (ABCA). The organization was established largely through the efforts of three prominent collegiate baseball coaches: Clint Evans of the University of California, Berkeley, Joe Bedenk of Pennsylvania State University, and Everett "Eppy" Barnes of Colgate University. The idea for the association emerged as early as 1938, when Evans began taking his California baseball teams to compete across the country. During these trips, Evans and other coaches discussed the need for the national organization for college baseball, drawing inspiration from the established coaching associations in college football and basketball. Since its founding, the ABCA has expanded significantly, growing to more than 5,000 members.

Students at many colleges began organizing games between colleges, particularly after the Civil War, first in the northeastern United States but quickly throughout the country. By the late 1870s, several northeastern schools were playing regular home and home series. The team with the best record claimed a "National Championship." Arguments over professional and graduate players led to the creation of the American College Base Ball Association in late 1879, consisting of six northeastern schools which sought to govern such issues and organize games. This organization lasted until 1887, when it dissolved in acrimony and waves of realignment. The Western Conference and Southern Intercollegiate Athletic Association were formed in the 1890s as multi-sport conferences. The first tournament to name a national champion was held at the 1893 World's Fair in Chicago, resulting in Yale being crowned champion. No other such tournament was held until the first College World Series in 1947.

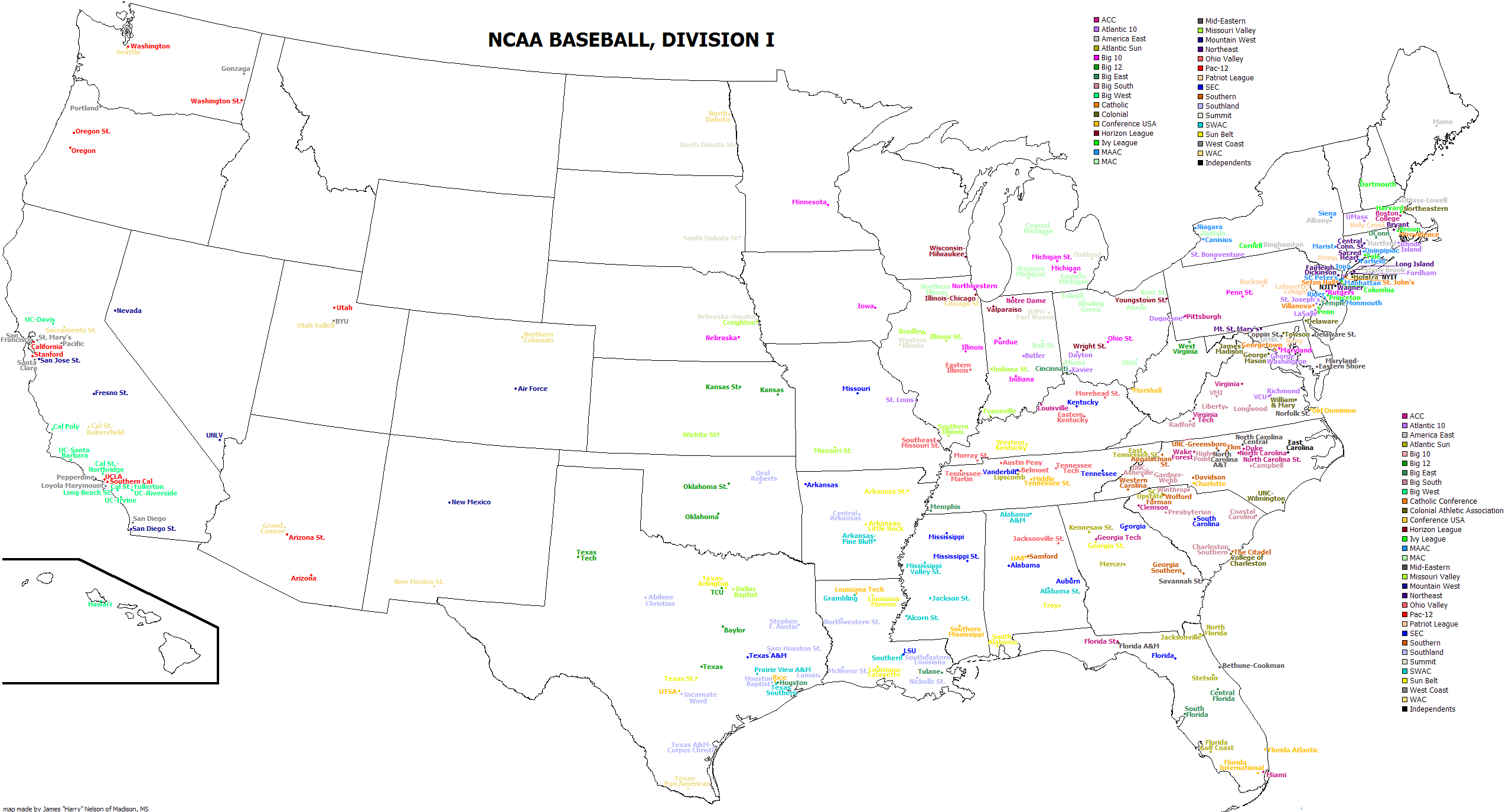
A map of all NCAA Division I baseball teams, using 2014 alignments

Traditionally, college baseball has been played in the early part of the year, with a relatively short schedule and during a time when cold (and/or rainy) weather hinders the ability for games to be played, particularly in the northern and midwestern parts of the U.S. These and other factors have historically led most colleges and universities across the nation to effectively consider baseball a minor sport, both in scholarships as well as money and other points of emphasis.

College baseball's popularity has increased greatly since the 1980s. As increased efforts to popularize the sport resulted in better players and overall programs, more television and print media coverage began to emerge. The ESPN family of networks have greatly increased television coverage of the NCAA playoffs and the Men's College World Series since 2003.

For 2008 and succeeding seasons, the NCAA mandated the first ever start date for Division I baseball, thirteen weeks before the selection of the NCAA tournament field, which takes place on Memorial Day.

== Collegiate rules ==
The rules of college baseball are similar to the Official Baseball Rules. Exceptions include the following:

- The bat may be made of wood, or a composite material that meets NCAA standards. Since the 2011 season, composite bats have been required to pass the "Bat-Ball Coefficient of Restitution" (BBCOR) test.
- The designated hitter rule is used. In addition, a player may serve as both pitcher and DH at the same time and may remain in one position when removed in the other.
- One or both ends of a doubleheader are sometimes seven innings in length. However, the NCAA has recently tightened the interpretation of what constitutes a regulation game, encouraging schools to play as many nine-inning games as possible. Seven-inning games may be played on the final day of a conference series, or if the two teams in a non-conference match will play a doubleheader, often to make up a game that could not be played earlier in the year due to inclement weather.
- A mercy rule may be in use, which terminates play when one team is ahead by 10 or more runs after seven innings (6½ innings if the home team is winning). In games that are scheduled for seven innings the rule takes effect in the fifth. This rule is not used in NCAA tournament games. Several conferences institute this rule only on Sundays or the final day of a conference series so that the visiting team can travel early. In some conferences, the mercy rule may also be used to end such games in order to start the next tournament game sooner.
- There is an automatic ejection for maliciously running into a defender who is trying to tag a runner or execute a force out. An automatic double play may also be called if a player slides into a base in an attempt to take out the defensive player who is trying to throw the ball to complete a double play.
- In televised games and in tournament games, instant replay may be used to determine if a slide was malicious.

== Metal versus wood bat ==
Though a wood bat is legal in NCAA competition, players overwhelmingly prefer and use a metal bat. The metal bat was implemented in college baseball in 1975. Use of a metal bat is somewhat controversial. Supporters of an aluminum or composite bat note that it can increase offensive performance, as the speed of a ball off a metal bat is generally faster than off a wood bat. Those against metal, and for wood, argue that a metal bat is not safe to use, and that a metal bat does not prepare players for the next level, as professional baseball uses a wood bat exclusively. In the 2011 season the NCAA changed the requirements for a metal bat, reducing the maximum allowed exit speed in a way that is said to produce a feeling more like a wood bat. As a result, in 2011 there was a drop-off in overall "long" drives or home runs relative to past years.

== Draft process ==
All players resident in the U.S. and its territories, plus Canada, are eligible to be selected in Major League Baseball's Rule 4 Draft upon graduating from high school. However, once a player enrolls in a four-year college or university, he is not allowed to be drafted (or re-drafted) until completing three years of school or reaching age 21, whichever comes first. By contrast, players who enroll in junior colleges (i.e., two-year institutions) are eligible for selection at any time. The Rule 4 Draft of eligible college and high school players consists of 20 rounds, most recently reduced from 40 after the 2019 edition. Despite MLB's draft being considerably longer than that of the NFL or NBA, only about 9.1% of all NCAA senior baseball players are drafted by an MLB team.

One of the biggest controversies with the draft and these amateur athletes is the use of agents. There have been many cases of college athletes consulting or hiring an agent prematurely in direct violation of NCAA rules. The NCAA came up with the "no agent rule" as a result of this, claiming it was to benefit the amateur athletes. The rule states that "[a]n individual shall be ineligible for participation in an intercollegiate sport if he or she has agreed (orally or in writing) to be represented by an agent for the purpose of marketing his or her athletics ability or reputation in that sport". Representation of an agent is considered to be any direct contact with the professional team during the contract negotiations. This contact can be made many different ways, whether through direct conversation, via mail or through the telephone. This rule is strongly enforced by the NCAA and has harsh consequences if broken. Recent changes to NCAA rules regarding compensation to college athletes for the use of their name, image, and likeness (NIL) have clarified that players can sign with agents to negotiate endorsement deals without loss of eligibility, though not for negotiating with professional teams.

== Recruitment process ==
The recruitment process is similar to that of the Major League Draft in that a high school athlete is taking the next step in his career. The NCAA places restrictions on the coaches that are trying to convince athletes to come play for them and attend their university. College baseball programs are only allowed to offer a limited number of scholarships each year, so the process of earning a scholarship is quite competitive. Baseball is classified by the NCAA as an "equivalency" sport, meaning that limits on athletic financial aid are set to the equivalent of a fixed number of full scholarships. Through the 2025 season, Division I schools were allowed the equivalent of 11.7 full scholarships; Division II schools, only 9.0. In Division I, the NCAA also limited the total number of players receiving baseball-related financial aid to 27, and also requires that each of these players receive athletic aid equal to at least 25% of a full scholarship. The 25% rule did not apply to schools that offer aid based solely on financial need (most notably Ivy League members), and also does not apply to a player in his final year of athletic eligibility who has not previously received athletically related aid in baseball at any college. A long-standing official NCAA rules interpretation also allowed schools to count aid that would otherwise be exempt by NCAA rule (such as purely academic awards) toward the 25% limit, as long as it also is included in the calculations for the team equivalency limit.

Following the settlement of the House v. NCAA legal case, which took full effect after the 2025 season, scholarship limits in Division I were replaced by roster limits. The settlement was binding on the original defendant conferences—the "Power Four" conferences (ACC, Big Ten, Big 12, SEC) and the Pac-12, which had "power" status before its 2024 collapse. A large majority of Division I members opted into the House framework, also making them subject to roster limits. Since the 2026 season, these programs have a hard roster limit of 34. Both before and after the House settlement, schools have generally chosen to award multiple partial scholarships rather than exclusively full scholarships.

Before September 1 of a potential college player's 11th grade year, it is illegal for a college program to give any kind of recruiting materials to the prospect. A phone call is not even permitted to the prospect until July 1 of the student's 11th grade year. Once the player is committed to the school of his choice, he must sign his letter of intent during one of several signing periods. The early signing period for a Division I baseball player is between November 8 and 15; the late signing period dates for these players are April 11 to August 1.

== Substance policies ==
The substance policies for college baseball are very strict and set by the NCAA. There is a set list of substances a college baseball player is forbidden to use, and there is severe punishment for those that defy it, whether it would be intentional or unintentional. There is a very long list of these substances, including anabolic steroids, stimulants, narcotics, and heroin, to name just a few. These substances fit into eight categories which are stimulants, anabolic agents, diuretics, narcotics, peptide hormones, metabolic modulators, and beta-2 agonists. Failure to pass scheduled or random drug tests can result in ineligibility.

== Attendance records ==
=== Top college baseball crowds on campus ===
Rank	Attendance	Teams	Stadium	City	Date	Note
1	16,423	Ole Miss at Mississippi State	Dudy Noble Field	Starkville, Mississippi	April 15, 2023	
2	15,586	Ole Miss at Mississippi State	Dudy Noble Field	Starkville, Mississippi	April 12, 2014	
3	15,289	LSU at Mississippi State	Dudy Noble Field	Starkville, Mississippi	April 25, 2026	
4	15,078	Texas A&M at Mississippi State	Dudy Noble Field	Starkville, Mississippi	April 16, 2016	
5	14,991	Florida at Mississippi State	Dudy Noble Field	Starkville, Mississippi	April 22, 1989	
6	14,834	Vanderbilt at Mississippi State	Dudy Noble Field	Starkville, Mississippi	March 21, 2026	
7	14,739	Ole Miss at Mississippi State	Dudy Noble Field	Starkville, Mississippi	April 14, 2023	
8	14,649	Vanderbilt at Mississippi State	Dudy Noble Field	Starkville, Mississippi	March 20, 2026	
9	14,562	Auburn at Mississippi State	Dudy Noble Field	Starkville, Mississippi	April 20, 2013	
10/11	14,468	Ole Miss at Mississippi State	Dudy Noble Field	Starkville, Mississippi	May 10, 2025	Game 1 of double header
10/11	14,468	Ole Miss at Mississippi State	Dudy Noble Field	Starkville, Mississippi	May 10, 2025	Game 2 of double header
12	14,385	Notre Dame at Mississippi State	Dudy Noble Field	Starkville, Mississippi	June 12, 2021	NCAA Super Regionals
13	14,378	LSU at Mississippi State	Dudy Noble Field	Starkville, Mississippi	April 16, 1988	
14	14,320	Arizona State at Mississippi State	Dudy Noble Field	Starkville, Mississippi	February 25, 2023	
15	14,273	Alabama at Mississippi State	Dudy Noble Field	Starkville, Mississippi	May 4, 2024	
16	14,228	LSU at Mississippi State	Dudy Noble Field	Starkville, Mississippi	April 9, 2022	
17	14,077	Alabama at Mississippi State	Dudy Noble Field	Starkville, Mississippi	March 26, 2022	
18	13,974	LSU at Mississippi State	Dudy Noble Field	Starkville, Mississippi	March 16, 2024	
19/20	13,970	Kentucky at Mississippi State	Dudy Noble Field	Starkville, Mississippi	May 3, 2025	Game 1 of double header
19/20	13,970	Kentucky at Mississippi State	Dudy Noble Field	Starkville, Mississippi	May 3, 2025	Game 2 of double header
21	13,917	Notre Dame at Mississippi State	Dudy Noble Field	Starkville, Mississippi	June 13, 2021	NCAA Super Regionals
22	13,772	Auburn at Mississippi State	Dudy Noble Field	Starkville, Mississippi	May 30, 2026	
23	13,761	Arkansas at Mississippi State	Dudy Noble Field	Starkville, Mississippi	April 25, 1992	
24	13,715	Clemson at Mississippi State	Dudy Noble Field	Starkville, Mississippi	June 9, 2007	NCAA Super Regionals
25	13,691	Kentucky at Mississippi State	Dudy Noble Field	Starkville, Mississippi	April 8, 2017	

== Video gaming ==
After losing its license for Major League Baseball, EA Sports released MVP 06: NCAA Baseball, the first college baseball video game. A second game, MVP 07: NCAA Baseball, was also released before the series was discontinued due to low sales.

== See also ==
- List of NCAA Division I baseball programs
- 2026 NCAA Division I baseball season
- NCAA Division I Baseball Championship
  - Men's College World Series
- NCAA Division II Baseball Championship
- NCAA Division III Baseball Championship
- NAIA Baseball World Series
- JUCO World Series
- NCBA World Series division D1 championship
- NCBA World Series division D2 championship
- USA Baseball
- Amateur baseball in the United States
- NCAA Division I college baseball team statistics
- National College Baseball Hall of Fame
- Baseball awards § U.S. college baseball
- List of college baseball awards
- List of college baseball career home run leaders
- List of collegiate summer baseball leagues
- List of Division I colleges that do not sponsor baseball
- United States national baseball team § Collegiate National Team
- World University Baseball Championship
- Baseball at the Summer Universiade
- College athletics
