= Steriogram =

New Zealand rock band

- Origin: Auckland, New Zealand
- Genres: Punk rock; alternative rock; pop-punk; alternative metal; rapcore (early)
- Years active: 1999–2010
- Labels: Capitol; Toshiba EMI; Bedroom Empire
- Past members: Tyson Kennedy; Tim Youngson; Brad Carter; Jared Wrennall; Jake Adams

Steriogram were a New Zealand punk rock band that formed in Auckland in 1999. The band consisted of frontman Tyson Kennedy (lead vocals and drums), Brad Carter (vocals, lead guitar and lead vocals), Tim Youngson (rhythm guitar and backing vocals), Jake Adams (bass guitar and backing vocals) and Jared Wrennall (drums and backing vocals). The band released three studio albums Schmack! (2004), This Is Not the Target Market (2007) and Taping the Radio (2010). The band's 2004 international hit single "Walkie Talkie Man" was used in an advertisement for the iPod and a number of films and video games.

== History ==
=== Formation, EPs and Schmack! (1999–2005) ===
Steriogram was formed in June 1999 by Brad Carter and Jake Adams, two friends from Whangārei, who joined with Tyson Kennedy and Tim Youngson, two friends from Auckland. They started performing as a melodic rock four-piece band with a manic live show. They released the EP Soccerstar in December that year. It had three tracks, "Chiqboom", "Soccerstar" and "Aeroplane". Only 500 copies were made.

Their second recording, "White Trash", released in August 2001, was more successful. Its b-side was "Soccerstar". They made a video for "White Trash" with drummer Kennedy rapping and it got so much exposure they decided he should stop drumming and move to the front of the stage to rap. They then recruited mutual friend Jared Wrennall from Balclutha, as drummer and became a five-piece. From then they started writing more of their songs with a hip hop influence. Steriogram toured New Zealand in a friend's van without any support crew, doing gigs where they could.

In 2002, still unsigned, they joined several other New Zealand bands in the inaugural Boost Mobile School's Tour, playing for free during high school lunch hours to get exposure, as well as at bars at night. During the tour they released the EP Sing the Night Away, which contained five tracks: "Sing the Night Away", "Free", "Big Lady Loving", "White Trash (DLT remix)" and "West Side!". Videos were made for the songs "Sing The Night Away" and "Free".

While recording at a rented beach house in 2002 they were contacted by a scout for American label Capitol Records, who had come upon their music video for "White Trash" on the website nzmusic.com, and were signed to Capitol Records later that year. 2004 saw the release of their debut album Schmack!. In addition to "White Trash", five more tracks from it were released as singles: "Walkie Talkie Man", "Roadtrip", "Go", "Tsunami" and "On and On". Three songs from Sing the Night Away featured on singles from the album: "Sing the Night Away", "Free" and "Big Lady Loving".

There were two main factors contributing to Steriogram’s immediate success. First, the national school tour helped to generate a wider fan base. The other factor was their Internet site and the use of fans' loyalty. On the site fans were able to join up for the band’s newsletter and then eventually to what was known as a "fan street pack". This was sent to the fan via mail and contained promo CDs that had five of the tracks to be featured on their upcoming CD, and many stickers. This was where Steriogram relied on the support of fans, to hand out the promo CDs and stickers. These points proved to be very successful and rewarding for Steriogram as a new band.

Their big break came with the release of "Walkie Talkie Man", which was used for iPod advertisements, and its music video, in which characters and objects were created by knitting puppets and animating them using stopmotion. The video, directed by Michel Gondry, was nominated for four MTV music awards. The song debuted at No. 19 on the UK Singles Chart. It was used in several films and video games including Elite Beat Agents, MVP Baseball 2004, and MLB 2005.

The band toured New Zealand during New Zealand Music Month in May 2005 with the support of other New Zealand bands 48May and Goodnight Nurse. Also in 2005, their album Schmack! was re-released as a special edition containing three songs from Sing the Night Away and a cover of AC/DC's "Back in Black".

=== This Is Not the Target Market (2006–2009) ===
The band recorded the album This Is Not the Target Market at York Street Studio in Auckland and released it in New Zealand on 16 October 2006. Unlike the first album, it was not released under Capitol Records. In an interview with Juice TV, band members Brad Carter and Tyson Kennedy stated that all the band's connections at Capitol had left since the release of Schmack!, and they decided it would be easier to release the new album themselves. The first single off the album was "Just Like You". Rock Ridge Music released the album in the United States in October 2007. With the release of This Is Not the Target Market the band toured extensively through the year with such bands as Rise Against and German band Die Ärzte. Steriogram then went on the road with Bad Religion in June 2008.

=== Taping the Radio and after (2010–2011) ===
Steriogram's third album, Taping the Radio, was released on 18 September 2010 on iTunes, and subsequently made available in New Zealand stores on 2 November 2010.

Steriogram were working on a movie titled The Life and Death of Steriogram, "a rock-u-mentary which delves into the world of New Zealand's biggest rock band, Steriogram, providing a behind the scenes look at their new tour and the obstacles they face as they try to scrape themselves, once again, to the top of the rock and roll pile". A Kickstarter fundraiser was set up on 9 December 2011, in order to raise funds to help finish the film. However, on 5 January 2012, the fundraiser was cancelled with only $2,570 of the $22,000 goal raised, and the project was scrapped. Since 2011, band members have gone on to perform in other projects and pursue other careers.

== Band members ==
- Tyson Kennedy – lead vocals (2001–2010), drums (1999–2001)
- Brad Carter – vocals (2001–2010), lead guitar (1999–2010), lead vocals (1999–2001)
- Tim Youngson – rhythm guitar, backing vocals (1999–2010)
- Jake Adams – bass guitar, backing vocals (1999–2010)
- Jared Wrennall – drums, backing vocals (2001–2010)

== Discography ==
=== Studio albums ===
List of albums, with selected chart positions and label shown
Year	Album	Peak chart positions	Label
Year	Album	NZ	Label
2004	Schmack!	3	Capitol Records
2007	This Is Not the Target Market	—	Toshiba EMI
2010	Taping the Radio	—	Bedroom Empire

=== EPs ===
Year	Album	Label
1999	Soccerstar	Capitol Records
2001	Sing the Night Away	Capitol Records

=== Singles ===
Year	Title	Peak chart positions			Album
Year	Title	NZ	AUS	UK	Album
1999	"Soccerstar"	—	—	—	Soccerstar EP
2001	"Sing The Night Away"	—	—	—	Sing the Night Away EP
2001	"White Trash"	—	—	—	Schmack!
2004	"Walkie Talkie Man"	14	80	19	Schmack!
2004	"Roadtrip"	—	—	—	Schmack!
2005	"Go"	28	—	81	Schmack!
2005	"Tsunami"	—	—	—	Schmack!
2005	"On and On"	—	—	—	Schmack!
2006	"Just Like You"	—	—	—	This Is Not the Target Market
2007	"Own Way Home"	—	—	—	This Is Not the Target Market
2010	"Ready for Action"	—	—	—	Taping the Radio
2010	"Skinny Runt Revolution"	—	—	—	Taping the Radio
2010	"Moving On"	—	—	—	Taping the Radio
"—" denotes a recording that did not chart or was not released in that territory.

=== Featured appearances ===
The group has appeared on the following compilations and soundtracks.

- 2002: Channel Z: The Best of Vol. 3 (Warner Music) - "Sing the Night Away"
- 2004: MVP Baseball 2004 - "Walkie Talkie Man"
- 2004: State of the Nation: Fresh New Zealand Rock (EMI) - "Roadtrip"
- 2004: Hot Wheels: Hot Hits 4 (Shock Records) - "Walkie Talkie Man"
- 2004: Pump It Up Exceed SE (Andamiro) - "Walkie Talkie Man"
- 2004: Warren Miller's Impact (Warren Miller Films) - "Roadtrip"
- 2004: ATV Offroad Fury 3 - "On and On", "Schmack!"
- 2005: Donkey Konga 2 - "Roadtrip"
- 2005: Robots (Virgin Records) - "Walkie Talkie Man"
- 2005: Top of the Pops 2005 (Universal Music) - "Walkie Talkie Man"
- 2005: Now That's What I Call Music 17 (EMI) - "Go"
- 2005: Kicking & Screaming (soundtrack)
- 2005: Punked (Warner Music) - "Walkie Talkie Man"
- 2006: More Nature (Sony BMG) - "Walkie Talkie Man"
- 2006: Elite Beat Agents (Nintendo) - "Walkie Talkie Man" (covered by Jason Paige)
- 2008: WWE SmackDown vs. Raw 2009 - "Get Up"
