= MVP 07: NCAA Baseball =

- Developer: EA Canada
- Publisher: EA Sports
- Platform: PlayStation 2
- Release: NA: February 6, 2007
- Genre: Sports simulation
- Modes: Single player, Multiplayer

MVP 07: NCAA Baseball is a video game for the PlayStation 2 that was released February 6, 2007. Former Long Beach State pitcher and 2004 Roger Clemens Award winner Jered Weaver is on the cover, wearing his 2004 college uniform. This is also the last game in the series.

== Reception ==
The game was met with positive reception upon release, as GameRankings gave it a score of 76.89%, while Metacritic gave it 76 out of 100.

Reception

Aggregate scores
Aggregator	Score
GameRankings	76.89%
Metacritic	76/100

Review scores
Publication	Score
1Up.com	C+
Electronic Gaming Monthly	6.67/10
Game Informer	7/10
GamePro	4/5
GameSpot	7.7/10
GameSpy	4/5
GameTrailers	8.3/10
GameZone	7.9/10
IGN	7.6/10
PlayStation: The Official Magazine	8.5/10

== See also ==
- MVP Baseball
- MVP 06: NCAA Baseball
