= MVP 06: NCAA Baseball =

2006 video game

- North American cover art for PlayStation 2 Pictured: David Maroul
- Developer: EA Canada
- Publisher: Electronic Arts
- Platforms: PlayStation 2, Xbox
- Release: NA: January 17, 2006
- Genre: Sports
- Modes: Single-player, Multiplayer

MVP 06: NCAA Baseball is the fourth edition of the baseball video game series developed by Electronic Arts. Because of Electronic Arts' loss of the Major League Baseball (MLB) license to Take Two Interactive in 2005, which held the exclusive MLB license until 2014, the publishers decided to transition the MVP series to feature NCAA baseball, joining the publisher's NCAA football and basketball lines. MVP 06 was released on January 17, 2006 for the Xbox and PlayStation 2 consoles. The athlete on the cover is former Texas Longhorn David Maroul.

== Changes to gameplay ==
While MVP 06 offers several large changes to gameplay in batting and fielding to reflect the switch to the collegiate game (aluminum bats, fielding by collegiate players), pitching remained essentially unchanged. Also, MVP 06 offers the player an option to change hitting and fielding to "classic" mode, reverting the controls to those of MVP Baseball 2005.

=== Load and fire batting ===
MVP 06 offers a brand new method for controlling the batter called "load and fire" batting. The player takes control of the batter's body by pressing and holding a button to lift the hitter's leg at the correct time so the hitter can use his hips to rip into the ball.

=== Precision throw control ===
The game also features a new precision throw control. Players use the right analog stick in order to throw the ball to the bases. If a player holds the button too long, he can overthrow the base, and if he does not hold the throw button long enough the ball could fall short, likely causing an error.

=== Create-a-Ballpark mode ===
In addition to the features mentioned above, the game has also improved the "create-a-ballpark" feature. The player can set the distance and height of the walls, as well as the surrounding backdrop, the field surface, and the size of foul territory.

== Reception ==
Reception

Aggregate scores
Aggregator	Score	
Aggregator	PS2	Xbox
GameRankings	77.98%	77.61%
Metacritic	76/100	75/100

Review scores
Publication	Score	
Publication	PS2	Xbox
Electronic Gaming Monthly	6.67/10	6.67/10
Game Informer	7/10	7/10
GamePro	3.5/5	3.5/5
GameRevolution	B	B
GameSpot	8/10	8/10
GameSpy	4/5	4/5
GameZone	8/10	N/A
IGN	8.5/10	8.7/10
Official U.S. PlayStation Magazine	4/5	N/A
Official Xbox Magazine (US)	N/A	7/10
Detroit Free Press	2/4	2/4
USA Today	7/10	7/10

The game was met with positive reception upon release. GameRankings and Metacritic gave it a score of 77.98% and 76 out of 100 for the PlayStation 2 version, and 77.61% and 75 out of 100 for the Xbox version.

The A.V. Club gave it an A−, stating that "the mini-games are awesome, especially the batting challenge, which lets you get used to EA's "load and fire" batting system (which, we hear, was licensed from Club Jenna)". The New York Times gave it a favorable review and said: "The big news is a different online feature, ESPN Integration, which uses your network connection to run a live ESPN news ticker along the bottom of your screen as you play. This is a wonderfully ingenious way to increase the sense that you are experiencing an actual baseball game, and to keep sports aficionados satisfied". Maxim, on the other hand, gave it a score of seven out of ten and stated that "after nine innings, it's basically the same game, including easy to master controls that'll finally allow you to be big man on campus. Or at least big man on LAN party". USA Today similarly gave it seven stars out of ten and said that the game "shows promise for the genre with its innovative take on batting. But a game that is as thrilling as a bunt could have been fun as a grand slam". Detroit Free Press gave it two stars out of four: "The game itself has decent game play, but is hurt because of the lack of attention given to the bells and whistles".

== See also ==
- MVP Baseball
- MVP Baseball 2005
