= Major League Baseball on television in the 2020s =

This article describes Major League Baseball's television coverage in the 2020s.

Major League Baseball renewed its broadcast agreements with Fox Sports, ESPN Major League Baseball and TBS prior to the 2022 season. Because ESPN reduced the number of games it would broadcast in its new deal, MLB reached new streaming agreements to air exclusive games on Apple TV+ and Peacock. In 2024, the games on Peacock would move to The Roku Channel.

Due largely to the bankruptcy of Diamond Sports Group and the shutdown of AT&T SportsNet, several teams experienced changes to their local broadcasts during the 2020s. Major League Baseball, through its MLB Local Media unit, took over local broadcasts for the Diamondbacks, Padres, Rockies, Guardians, and Twins.

ESPN and Major League Baseball, which have had a broadcast relationship since 1990, mutually agreed to exercise an opt-out of their broadcast agreement following the 2025 season. This decision marked a significant shift in sports media, potentially opening the door for new broadcasting partners and digital streaming opportunities.

== Year-by-year breakdown ==
=== 2020 ===
==== National ====
2020 was the seventh year of an eight-year-long deal with Fox, ESPN, and TBS. Due to the COVID-19 pandemic, the 2020 Major League Baseball season was shortened to 60 games. The season's opening day was July 27, and there was no All-Star game or Home Run Derby.

As part of the shortened season, Major League Baseball used an expanded Wild Card Series for the 2020 season. TBS televised one AL Wild Card Series, both American League Division Series match-ups and the American League Championship Series. ESPN televised seven of the eight Wild Card Series with live look-ins and alternate broadcasts on ESPN+. On September 28, it was announced that ABC would broadcast at least four of ESPN's Wild Card Series games, marking the network's first national MLB game broadcast since 1995 (via the ill-fated The Baseball Network arrangement). FS1 and MLB Network would televise both National League Division Series match-ups. Fox and FS1 broadcast the National League Championship Series, and the World Series was on Fox for the 21st straight year.

==== Local ====
The Chicago White Sox and Chicago Cubs signed new broadcast deals that went into effect in the 2020 season. The White Sox moved all their locally controlled games to NBC Sports Chicago, while the Cubs moved all their locally controlled games to Marquee Sports Network.

Long-time Cincinnati Reds television play-by-play announcer Thom Brennaman resigned on September 26 after he was caught using a homophobic slur in a game on August 19 against the Kansas City Royals. Sideline host Jim Day took over Brennaman's duties for the rest of the season, beginning August 20.

=== 2021 ===
==== National ====
2021 was the eighth and final year of the contracts with Fox, ESPN, and TBS before new seven-year deals began in 2022. FS1 televised games on Tuesday nights and Saturdays, both during the afternoon and evening. Fox also aired some Saturday night games, as part of Baseball Night in America. ESPN televised games on its flagship Sunday Night Baseball as well as Monday and Wednesday night games and holiday games on Memorial Day and Labor Day. ESPN Sunday Night Baseball telecasts were exclusive. TBS televised 13 weeks of Sunday afternoon games and the National League postseason. The American League postseason was split between ESPN, Fox/FS1, and MLB Network (AL Wild Card on ESPN, the ALDS split between FS1 and MLB Network, and the ALCS on Fox and FS1). For the 22nd straight year, the 2021 World Series aired exclusively on Fox.

A three-game series between the Philadelphia Phillies and the San Francisco Giants, whose regional television rights were both held by the NBC Sports Regional Networks, aired exclusively and nationally on NBC's streaming service Peacock. This was the first time NBC Sports had produced a nationally televised Major League Baseball game since 2000.

ABC televised a Sunday Night Baseball match-up between the Chicago White Sox and the Chicago Cubs on August 8. The broadcast marked ABC's first broadcast of Sunday Night Baseball and the first regular season game since its involvement in The Baseball Network in 1995. Former ABC broadcaster and 2021 Ford C. Frick Award winner Al Michaels appeared as a special guest.

==== Local ====
On March 31, the eve of Opening Day, the Fox Sports Networks were rebranded as Bally Sports as part of an agreement between majority-owner Sinclair Broadcast Group and casino operator Bally's Corporation.

As part of its co-ownership of YES Network, Amazon Prime Video simulcast 21 of the Yankees games carried on broadcast TV by WPIX for Amazon Prime subscribers in the New York Yankees' home market.

=== 2022 ===
==== National ====
2022 was the first season of new broadcast deals for Fox, ESPN and TBS that were expected to run through 2028. Fox remains the league's main broadcaster, carrying a package of regular season games on the main Fox broadcast network and FS1, and Spanish-language broadcasts on Fox Deportes. Fox aired primetime Baseball Night in America games primarily on Saturday nights, as well as the All-Star Game and MLB at Field of Dreams games. With the move of Joe Buck to ESPN and Monday Night Football over the NFL off-season, Joe Davis became the new lead play-by-play announcer for Fox's MLB coverage. ESPN networks carried 30 exclusive games per season, including 25 Sunday Night Baseball games, as well as an Opening Day primetime game, the Home Run Derby, and Spanish-language broadcasts on ESPN Deportes. ESPN dropped most of its weeknight game packages under its new contract, with only five non-Sunday games scheduled. As part of the new deal, ESPN had the option to carry selected games on ABC and stream all of its games on ESPN+ (which, as before, carries a daily game from MLB.TV at no additional charge). TBS switched from late-season Sunday games to Tuesday-night games throughout the season. MLB Network continued to broadcast various games throughout the season, including original MLB Network Showcase games, and simulcasts from local broadcasters.

For the postseason, ESPN networks held rights to the wild-card round; due to logistical concerns (especially with the fluctuating placements of teams in the standings during the final games of the regular season), the network employed remote production for the Padres/Mets and Mariners/Blue Jays series. The latter series employed a variant of the "enhanced world feed" model used in the 2020 season, with commentators and other selected staff on-site at Rogers Centre, using video feeds from the Sportsnet production.

Fox Sports held rights to the National League Division Series, Championship Series, and the World Series for the 23rd consecutive season; TBS held rights to the American League Division Series and Championship Series. Spanish-language broadcasts of all ALDS and ALCS games aired on MLB Network.

Major League Baseball also reached a deal with Apple Inc. to establish a new exclusive package known as Friday Night Baseball in the United States, Canada, and other international territories, which is produced by MLB Network and streams on Apple TV+ throughout the regular season. NBC Sports re-entered MLB broadcasting with MLB Sunday Leadoff, a new exclusive package of Sunday afternoon games streamed on Peacock. The contract will initially be for two years. The MLB Game of the Week Live on YouTube also returned with fifteen games during the season.

In Canada, Sportsnet—the main Canadian rights-holder of MLB, and regional broadcaster of the co-owned Toronto Blue Jays—gained the rights to produce local broadcasts of postseason games if the Blue Jays participate (as opposed to previous seasons, where it was required to simulcast the U.S. telecasts), featuring its main broadcast team of Buck Martinez and Pat Tabler (Sportsnet's alternate play-by-play announcer, Dan Shulman, had commitments to ESPN Radio's postseason coverage. This became moot for future seasons after Shulman announced that he would step down from ESPN Radio's coverage after the 2022 season to focus more on roles at Sportsnet).

==== Local ====
Amazon Prime Video exclusively streams 21 Yankees games in the Yankees home market (except for the final game in the package, which was simulcast on both Prime Video and YES Network due to Aaron Judge's home run record). These games used to be allocated to WPIX (which retains a sub-licensed 28-game Mets package from SNY).

On June 1, 2022, NESN, the television home of the Boston Red Sox, launched NESN 360, an over-the-top subscription streaming platform that offers live streams of Red Sox games without a cable subscription.

On June 23, 2022, Bally Sports soft-launched Bally Sports+, an over-the-top subscription streaming platform that offers live streams and market-specific video-on-demand content from its regional networks. At that time, Bally managed to negotiate streaming rights for only five of the MLB teams it owns local TV rights to: Detroit, Kansas City, Miami, Milwaukee, and Tampa.

=== 2023 ===
==== National ====
2023 was the second year of the existing planned seven-year deals with ESPN, Fox, TBS, Apple TV+, and MLB Network; and the second year of a two-year contract with NBC Sports/Peacock:

Fox continued to air their Baseball Night in America exclusive Saturday games. However, the slate began in May, with the return of Saturday afternoon games in April, and Thursday evening games in the latter part of the season where Saturday games would conflict with Fox's college football obligations. The network also aired the 2023 MLB All-Star Game. FS1 also broadcast non-exclusive games on Saturdays at times when no game is on the broadcast network, along with some irregularly scheduled weeknight games, mostly on Monday nights. Jason Benetti joined Fox as a play-by-play announcer. Derek Jeter joined Fox Sports as a studio analyst.

During the postseason, the ESPN networks (including ABC) (with Spanish–language simulcasts on ESPN Deportes) aired all four Wild Card Series. TBS (with Spanish-language simulcasts on MLB Network) then broadcast the National League Division Series and the National League Championship Series, and Fox Sports (Fox and FS1, with Spanish-language simulcasts on Fox Deportes) broadcast the American League Division Series, the American League Championship Series and the World Series.

Apple TV+ continues to hold the rights to Friday Night Baseball. Wayne Randazzo and Alex Faust will be the new primary play-by-play commentators, replacing Melanie Newman and Stephen Nelson. Dontrelle Willis and Ryan Spilborghs will be the new primary color commentators, replacing Katie Nolan, Hunter Pence, Hannah Keyser, and Chris Young. Randazzo will partner with Willis, while Faust will partner with Spilborghs. Peacock will continue to air 19 MLB Sunday Leadoff games on Sunday afternoons. Brendan Burke will be the primary play-by-play announcer with Matt Vasgersian and Chris Vosters filling in. One game will be simulcast on NBC.

YouTube did not renew its deal for the MLB Game of the Week Live on YouTube. YouTube TV also dropped MLB Network on February 1 in a carriage fee dispute.

In Canada, TVA Sports became the new national French-language broadcaster of the league under a three-season deal, carrying a package of 78 regular season games, the All-Star Game, and the postseason. TVA has historically also held French-language rights to the Toronto Blue Jays sub-licensed from Sportsnet, from which the network has sub-contracted some of its sports rights.

==== Local ====
In December, St. Louis Cardinals play-by-play announcer Dan McLaughlin was released by Bally Sports after a DWI arrest. The Cardinals later announced that Atlanta Braves play-by-play announcer Chip Caray would take over the same role with the team. In February, Brandon Gaudin was announced as the new play-by-play announcer for the Atlanta Braves on Bally Sports South and Bally Sports Southeast, replacing Caray.

On February 15, 2023, Diamond Sports Group, owners of the Bally Sports regional sports networks, failed to make a $140M interest payment and entered a 30-day grace period. On March 14, Diamond Sports officially filed for Chapter 11 Bankruptcy.

On May 31, Diamond officially missed a second payment to the Padres, and the Padres' television rights were returned to Major League Baseball. Because Bally Sports San Diego, which aired Padres games, is a joint venture between the Padres and Diamond, it was technically not in bankruptcy. Therefore this missed payment did not have the same bankruptcy protections that Diamond's other missed payments had.

On June 22, Diamond Sports Group announced its intention to reject its contract with the Diamondbacks on June 30. Diamond and the Arizona Diamondbacks later released a joint statement pushing back the hearing to July 17 and agreeing to continue Diamond's broadcast of Diamondbacks' games. On July 18, Diamond Sports officially rejected its contract with the Diamondbacks. Like with the Padres, Major League Baseball took over the production of the games, with the Diamondbacks' regular announcing team remaining in place.

On February 24, 2023, the AT&T SportsNet regional sports networks sent a letter to the Rockies, Astros, and Pirates saying they had until March 31, to reach an agreement to take their local television rights back. Warner Bros. Discovery, the owners of the networks, intend to leave the regional sports networks business. If a deal is not reached the networks will file for Chapter 7 bankruptcy. Root Sports Northwest was not affected because the Mariners already owned majority control of that network. The Houston Astros and Houston Rockets negotiated throughout the season to take over AT&T SportsNet Southwest from Warner Bros. Discovery. Ultimately, Warner Bros. Discovery and Major League Baseball negotiated a deal to keep the remaining RSNs operational through the end of the season.

On March 29, YES Network, the television home of the New York Yankees, launched an over-the-top subscription streaming platform that offers live streams of Yankees games without a cable subscription.

On May 22, NBC Sports California fired Oakland Athletics television play-by-play announcer Glen Kuiper. Kuiper's last broadcast was a May 5 game at the Kansas City Royals, during which he unintentionally uttered a racial slur while on the air. Vince Cotroneo and Johnny Doskow have since shared play-by-play duties in the television booth to replace Kuiper.

On July 25, Marquee Sports Network, the television home of the Chicago Cubs, launched an over-the-top subscription streaming platform that offers live streams of Cubs games without a cable subscription for $19.99 a month.

On September 29, the Houston Astros confirmed their acquisition of a 50% stake in Space City Home Network, the rebranded successor to AT&T SportsNet Southwest, securing a place for their games to air in 2024.

On December 13, the Pittsburgh Pirates announced they had acquired a stake in SportsNet Pittsburgh, the rebranded successor to AT&T SportsNet Pittsburgh, securing a place for their games to air in 2024.

On December 31, AT&T SportsNet Rocky Mountain shut down, leaving the Colorado Rockies without a television broadcaster.

=== 2024 ===
==== National ====
2024 was the third year of the planned seven-year deals with ESPN, Fox, TBS, Apple TV+, and MLB Network. 2024 was the first year of a multi-year contract with TelevisaUnivision.

Fox continued to air their Baseball Night in America and Fox Saturday Baseball slate of exclusive games on Saturday and select Thursday nights. The network aired the game at Rickwood Field, and also aired the 2024 MLB All-Star Game; both being exclusive games. FS1 also broadcasts non-exclusive games, including most Saturday afternoon games. Following his retirement, Adam Wainwright joined Fox as a full-time color commentator. He previously had done color commentary for Fox during select playoff games.

TBS continued to broadcast MLB Tuesday. Most games were blacked out in the home markets of the teams playing, however, TBS was allowed to co-exist once with a team's local broadcast. During the final month of the regular season, TBS' sister network TruTV also aired MLB Race to the Pennant on Tuesday nights. The show featured a whip-around format hosted by Alanna Rizzo and Yonder Alonso. For the first time, TruTV announced its intention to air a regular season baseball game, between the Astros and the Padres, on Tuesday, September 17. This marked the first regular season that the streaming service Max simulcasted TNT Sports (TBS and TruTV) games on its Bleacher Report Sports Add-on tier.

ESPN continued to broadcast Sunday Night Baseball, with the option to show alternate broadcasts. ESPN also exclusively aired six other non-Sunday night games, including a primetime game on opening night, two Wednesday Night Baseball games, one game from the MLB Mexico City Series and one game from the MLB London Series. ESPN also aired both games from the MLB Seoul Series which were blacked out in local markets. To end the regular season, ESPN2 aired a doubleheader featuring the Braves and the Mets. The games were scheduled to air on September 25 and 26 but were moved due to Hurricane Helene. The broadcasts were blacked out in New York. The network also had the rights to the 2024 Home Run Derby. ESPN+ continues holding rights to stream one game a day. All games are blacked out in local markets. During the final three weeks of the season, ESPN or ESPN2 aired Baseball Tonight Special: MLB Squeeze Play on Wednesday nights. The studio show featured whip-around coverage focused on the pennant chase.

In August 2024, MLB announced a new Spanish-language television agreement with TelevisaUnivision (whose TUDN Radio network holds the main Spanish-language radio rights to the league), under which UniMás and TUDN would air the weekly whip-around show MLB En Vivo on Tuesday nights through the remainder of the season, the weekly studio show MLB Esta Semana (lit. 'MLB This Week') on Saturday nights, and postseason coverage. Coverage is also streamed on Vix. Univision talent includes Antonio de Valdés and Enrique Burak as hosts, Daniel Nohra and Luis Quiñones as play-by-play commentators and Luis Alberto Martínez and Daniel Schvarztman as reporters and guest analysts.

MLB Network continued to broadcast games daily. While most games were simulcasts of the home teams' regional sports network broadcasts, select games were produced by the network under its MLB Network Showcase banner. All games were blacked out in the home markets of the teams playing.

Apple TV+ continues to hold the rights to Friday Night Baseball. Apple had the option to opt out of the Friday Night Baseball deal before the season, however on March 7 it announced that it would not opt out therefore it would not be able to exit the agreement until it expires in the 2028 season. This would also be the second year of DirecTV's sub-licensing agreement to show these games to commercial establishments.

The Roku Channel replaced Peacock as the home for MLB Sunday Leadoff. Games are also available to MLB.tv customers blackout-free.

During the postseason, the ESPN networks and ABC aired all four Wild Card Series. TNT Sports (TNT, TBS and TruTV) then carried the American League Division Series and the American League Championship Series. Fox Sports (Fox and FS1) broadcast the National League Division Series, the National League Championship Series, and the World Series.

ESPN Deportes and Fox Deportes hold rights to Spanish-language broadcasts of the postseason games aired by ESPN and Fox respectively, as part of MLB's agreement with TelevisaUnivision, Spanish-language coverage of the ALDS and ALCS aired on TUDN, UniMás, and Univision, and streamed on Vix. Spanish language coverage of Game 1 of the 2024 World Series will also air on Univision, marking the first time a Spanish language network aired the World Series on broadcast television.

==== Local ====
Warner Bros. Discovery (WBD) wound down its AT&T SportsNet regional sports network (RSN) business before the start of the 2024 season. The move affected the Colorado Rockies on AT&T SportsNet Rocky Mountain, the Houston Astros on AT&T SportsNet Southwest, and the Pittsburgh Pirates on AT&T SportsNet Pittsburgh.

The Astros and the NBA's Houston Rockets took over AT&T SportsNet Southwest and rebranded it to the Space City Home Network after the end of the Astros' regular season on October 3, 2023. Fenway Sports Group, owners of the NHL's Pittsburgh Penguins and Boston Red Sox, took over AT&T SportsNet Pittsburgh, rebranding it to just SportsNet Pittsburgh on October 2, 2023. On December 13, 2023, the Pirates announced they would jointly own SportsNet Pittsburgh beginning on January 1, 2024. NESN, through Fenway Sports Group, will operate the network. In February, MLB Local Media took over the production of Rockies games.

WBD had owned a 29% share of Root Sports Northwest, the Mariners' RSN, through the end of the 2023 season, and had produced Mariners telecasts. The Mariners took complete control of the network on January 1, 2024.

On October 31, 2023, the Minnesota Twins announced that television play-by-play announcer Dick Bremer would leave the booth to join the team's front office as its special assistant. On December 1, the Twins replaced Bremer with Cory Provus, and Kris Atteberry took Provus' place as the radio play-by-play announcer.

On November 9, 2023, Jason Benetti left the Chicago White Sox to join the Detroit Tigers as its lead television play-by-play announcer. Benetti replaced Matt Shepard whose contract was not renewed by Bally Sports Detroit. Dan Dickerson, the team's lead radio play-by-play announcer, will call games when Benetti has assignments with Fox Sports.

On December 18, C. J. Nitkowski left the Texas Rangers to join the Atlanta Braves as its primary television analyst. Jeff Francoeur, who served as the Braves' primary analyst the previous season, will continue to make occasional appearances.

On January 25, 2024, the Chicago White Sox announced John Schriffen as their lead television play-by-play announcer, replacing Jason Benetti who departed to join the Detroit Tigers as their lead play-by-play television announcer.

This would be the second season affected by the February 2023 bankruptcy of Diamond Sports Group, owners of the Bally Sports regional sports networks. On February 2, 2024, Diamond Sports announced agreements with the Rangers, Guardians and Twins that will result in a decreased rights fee and will end their contracts with Diamond after the 2024 season.

On February 13, 2024, the Oakland Athletics announced Jenny Cavnar as their lead television play-by-play announcer. She will be the first woman to be the primary play-by-play voice of an MLB team. On February 20, the Athletics hired Chris Caray, son of St. Louis Cardinals announcer Chip Caray, as Cavnar's backup.

Also on February 13, the Texas Rangers' broadcast team for 2024 was announced with Mike Bacsik, Dave Valle and David Murphy splitting analyst duties and Jared Sandler taking over as the backup TV play-by-play announcer behind Dave Raymond. The trio of Bacsik, Valle and Murphy replaced C. J. Nitkowski who joined the Braves broadcast team.

On September 30, 2024, NBC Sports Chicago, the television home of the White Sox, ended its operations after 20 years. The White Sox, the NHL's Chicago Blackhawks and the NBA's Chicago Bulls will move to the new Chicago Sports Network (CHSN) in the autumn as a joint venture with Standard Media Group.

=== 2025 ===
==== National ====
This is the fourth year of the existing seven-year deals with Fox, TBS, and Apple TV+. This is also the fourth year of a deal with ESPN. However, ESPN and Major League Baseball announced prior to the season that both parties had exercised a mutual opt-out to end the agreement following the 2025 season. This is the second year of a multi-year deal with TelevisaUnivision.

Fox will continue to air their Fox Saturday Baseball and Baseball Night in America slate of games on most Saturdays during the season and select Thursday nights (these games will be in regional windows with at least two games per night). Fox will exclusively air the MLB Speedway Classic as part of their package. Fox and FS1 will split coverage of the MLB Tokyo Series, with Fox airing the first game and FS1 airing the second; although Fox aired the first game, MLB allowed the Cubs' Marquee Sports Network and the Dodgers' Spectrum SportsNet LA to produce their own broadcasts in the Chicago and Los Angeles metropolitan areas. Fox will air the 2025 MLB All-Star Game. FS1 will also broadcast games, mainly on Saturday afternoons, which will be both non-exclusive, and co-exist with regional broadcasts. Fox One will simulcast in market and national Fox games, along with all FS1 games when the service launches this fall.

TBS will continue to broadcast MLB Tuesday. Most games are blacked out in the home markets of the teams playing, however, TBS is allowed to co-exist once with a teams' local broadcast. Max will continue to simulcast TBS' games, however beginning this season it will only stream games on its ad free tier.

ESPN will continue to broadcast Sunday Night Baseball, with the option to show alternate broadcasts, along with at-least five other exclusive regular season games. For the first time since 2021, ESPN will air a doubleheader on Opening Day. ESPN will also air a doubleheader on Sunday, July 6, as part of July 4 weekend. The network also has the rights to the Home Run Derby. Select games may air on ABC or ESPN2. Joe Buck, who was the lead MLB on Fox play-by-play commentator until he moved to ESPN for Monday Night Football in 2022, will call his first nationally televised baseball game for ESPN on Opening Day in 2025. For the first time, ESPN+ and Disney+ will simulcast coverage of ESPN's Opening Day games and the network has the option to simulcast additional ESPN produced games. However, unlike previous seasons, ESPN+ will not stream a daily MLB game produced by RSN’s.

Apple TV+ continues to hold the rights to Friday Night Baseball which features two exclusive games each Friday during the season.

This will be the second season that MLB Sunday Leadoff will be streamed on The Roku Channel under a multi-year deal which features one game each week from May to August. The network has the option in airing games in the early or late windows.

MLB Network will continue to broadcast a regular slate of games. While most games will be simulcasts of the teams' local broadcast, select games will be produced by the network under its MLB Network Showcase banner. All games are blacked out in the home markets of the teams playing.

UniMás and TUDN will air the weekly whiparound show MLB En Vivo (lit. 'MLB Live') on Tuesday nights throughout the season, the weekly studio show MLB Esta Semana (lit. 'MLB This Week') on Saturday nights, and postseason coverage.

MLB.tv will continue to stream out-of-market games (including out-of-market Fox games) and all Roku and MLB Network games.

During the postseason, the ESPN networks (including ABC, with Spanish–language simulcasts on ESPN Deportes) will air all four Wild Card Series. TNT Sports (TBS, truTV, and Max) will then broadcast the National League Division Series and the National League Championship Series, and Fox Sports (Fox and FS1, with Spanish-language simulcasts on Fox Deportes) will broadcast the American League Division Series, the American League Championship Series and the World Series.

==== Local ====
- The Chicago White Sox, the NBA's Chicago Bulls, the NHL's Chicago Blackhawks, and Standard Media launched the Chicago Sports Network in October 2024, replacing NBC Sports Chicago as their regional broadcaster. The new network is carried via both broadcast and subscription television. In June, Chicago Sports Network ended its broadcast television carriage in Illinois after reaching a carriage agreement with the subscription television service Comcast. This did not affect the network's broadcast carriage in Iowa, Indiana, Kentucky, and Michigan. However, in July, Chicago Sports Network announced an agreement with WCIU-TV in Chicago to simulcast seven White Sox games on broadcast television.
- MLB Advanced Media reached agreements with the Athletics, Dodgers, Giants, Mets, and Phillies to launch in-market direct-to-consumer (DTC) streaming packages via MLB.tv. For all teams except the Dodgers, subscribers will have the ability to bundle the service with MLB.tv's out-of-market package.
- Sportico reported that NBC Sports California had renegotiated its agreement with the Athletics to account for its transitional relocation to Sacramento. The network's broadcast territory has historically included the Sacramento market, where it serves as the regional broadcaster of the NBA's Sacramento Kings.
- Amid the now-resolved bankruptcy of Main Street Sports Group (formerly Diamond Sports Group)—owners of the FanDuel Sports Network (FDSN, formerly Bally Sports) regional sports networks, its contracts with the Cleveland Guardians, Milwaukee Brewers, Minnesota Twins, and Texas Rangers expired at the end of the 2024 season, while the Reds announced an agreement to opt out of its existing contract with Diamond.
  - MLB Local Media will assume the rights to the Guardians and Twins beginning in the 2025 season.
  - The Brewers and Reds were originally announced as also moving to MLB Local Media, but Diamond later re-entered into negotiations with both teams, and reached new agreements for them to remain on FanDuel Sports Network Wisconsin and Ohio respectively. The new contracts also include additional options to carry the teams' games on DTC platforms.
  - The Rangers launched the in-house Rangers Sports Network (RSN); it operates similarly to MLB Local Media, distributing games via agreements with television providers within the team's market, and offering a DTC service hosted by Victory+ (which is available via a paid subscription, or at no additional charge to authenticated subscribers of television providers who carry Rangers games). The Rangers also announced agreements with Gray Media and Nexstar Media Group to syndicate a package of 15 games—primarily Friday home games—to a statewide network of broadcast television stations, with KDAF in Dallas as flagship station.
  - Diamond renegotiated its contracts with most of the remaining teams it televises.
- MLB Local Media will also oversee production of Mariners telecasts with Root Sports Northwest's 2024 separation from Warner Bros. Discovery/TNT Sports, but the network will still handle distribution as before. Root Sports Northwest announced an in-house DTC service on March 21, 2025. On September 27, 2025, the Mariners decided to shut down Root Sports Northwest and move to MLB Local Media starting in 2026.
- On November 22, 2024, the Miami Marlins parted ways with television play-by-play announcer Paul Severino after seven seasons. On January 17, 2025, the Marlins announced that they have moved announcer Kyle Sielaff from radio to television play-by-play.
- Teams with local media agreements with FanDuel Sports Network and MLB Local Media began simulcasting a limited number of games on over-the-air stations. These deals resemble arrangements made under some of FDSN's NBA and NHL contracts, which similarly enable teams to simulcast a limited package of games on broadcast television.
  - In addition to airing on FanDuel Sports Network, the Braves, Cardinals, Royals, and Reds announced agreements to simulcast packages of games on networks of Gray Media broadcast stations. The Braves will air a package of 15 regular-season games in simulcast with FanDuel Sports Network South, with WPCH-TV in Atlanta as the flagship station. In addition, Gray exclusively produced and aired 10 spring training games. The Cardinals will air a package of at-least 10 regular season games in simulcast with FanDuel Sports Network Midwest, with Matrix Midwest as the flagship station. The Royals will air a package of 10 regular-season games in simulcast with FanDuel Sports Network Kansas City, with KSMO-TV as the flagship station. The Reds will air a package of 10 regular season games in simulcast with FanDuel Sports Network Ohio, with WXIX-TV and Rock Entertainment Sports Network as the flagship stations.
  - In March 2025, the Brewers and Tigers reached agreements with Fox Television Stations (a former sister to FDSN) to serve as flagships for similar arrangements, with Detroit's WJBK to simulcast 10 Tigers games with FanDuel Sports Network Detroit, and WITI in Milwaukee to simulcast 10 regular season Brewers games and 3 spring training games with FanDuel Sports Network Wisconsin. The Brewers' radio rightsholder Good Karma Brands is handling syndication agreements for the Brewers' package, which includes affiliates in other Wisconsin markets. In May, the Angels reached an agreement with KCOP-TV to simulcast 12 games.
  - Later in March, the Diamondbacks, Padres, and Rockies, whose television rights are controlled by MLB Local Media, reached similar agreements with Tegna Inc. to simulcast 10 games. The flagship stations will be KFMB-DT2 (The CW San Diego) for the Padres, KTVD for the Rockies, and KPNX for the Diamondbacks. The Guardians reached a similar agreement with Tegna in April, with WKYC serving as the Guardians' flagship. In April, the Twins also announced a 10-game simulcast agreement with Fox Television Stations. KMSP-TV will serve as the flagship station for these games; Gray Media will distribute games in other markets.
  - In April, the Marlins and Rays reached agreements with CBS News and Stations to simulcast 15 games. The Marlins' flagship will be WBFS-TV, while the Rays' flagship will be WTOG.
- On February 21, 2025, the Seattle Mariners promoted announcer Aaron Goldsmith to lead television play-by-play following the departure of Dave Sims to the New York Yankees' radio booth. The Mariners also parted ways with long-time television analyst Mike Blowers after a 17-year tenure. As a result, analyst duties will be split between Jay Buhner, Dave Valle, Angie Mentink, and Ryan Rowland-Smith.
- On March 3, the Orioles and Nationals reached a settlement to end the teams' dispute over television rights fee payments. Mid-Atlantic Sports Network (MASN), which is owned and operated by the Orioles but airs both teams' games, pays rights fees to the Nationals. Through the settlement, the Nationals' agreement with the Orioles and MASN will end following the 2025 season.
- On March 12, the Braves announced that they would introduce Spanish-language commentary on SAP for regional games on FanDuel Sports Network, with Francisco X. Rivera on play-by-play.
- On March 18, the NBC Sports Regional Networks—the broadcast home of the Athletics, Giants and Phillies—launched in-market DTC services as paid add-ons for NBCUniversal's streaming service Peacock, which include all programming broadcast by the networks. Access to these services require an active Peacock subscription. The next day, MLB announced separate agreements with the teams to also offer DTC packages via MLB.tv; these packages do not require a Peacock subscription, but does not include other programming from the teams' networks.
- On March 24, Nationals TV play-by-play announcer Bob Carpenter announced that he will retire following the conclusion of the 2025 season. Carpenter has called Nationals games since the 2006 season, and previously called games for the Texas Rangers and St. Louis Cardinals, as well as occasional national assignments with ESPN.
- On April 21, Mid-Atlantic Sports Network, the home of the Nationals and Orioles, announced the launch of a direct-to-consumer streaming service. The Astros are now the only MLB team without a DTC option.
- In May, the Athletics announced an agreement with Gray Media to simulcast 15 games in Las Vegas, in preparation for the teams' move to the city, on KVVU and Silver State Sports & Entertainment Network.

=== 2026 ===
==== National ====
In November 2025, Major League Baseball reached new, three-year agreements with NBC Sports, ESPN, and Netflix to replace the previous ESPN agreement.

This will also be the fifth year of the existing seven-year deals with Fox, TBS, and Apple TV.

- Fox will continue to air Fox Saturday Baseball, Baseball Night in America, and the 2026 MLB All-Star Game. FS1 will also broadcast games, mainly on Saturday afternoons, which will be both non-exclusive and co-exist with regional broadcasts.
- NBC will air Sunday Night Baseball games from April to August, along with primetime games on Opening Day and Labor Day, and MLB Sunday Leadoff on July 5. NBC will also air the 2026 MLB Draft and the 2026 All Star Futures Game. NBCSN will carry the remainder of Sunday Night Baseball and MLB Sunday Leadoff games.
- ESPN will exclusively broadcast 30 games, primarily on summer weeknights. As part of this package, ESPN will continue to air the MLB Little League Classic, along with games on Memorial Day and the second-half opener.
- TBS will continue to broadcast MLB Tuesday. Most games are blacked out in the home markets of the teams playing; however, TBS is allowed to co-exist once with a team's local broadcast.
- During the postseason, NBC Sports (NBC and NBCSN, with Spanish–language simulcasts on Universo) will air all four Wild Card Series. TNT Sports (TBS and truTV) will then broadcast the American League Division Series and the American League Championship Series, and Fox Sports (Fox and FS1, with Spanish-language simulcasts on Fox Deportes) will broadcast the National League Division Series, the National League Championship Series and the World Series.
- HBO Max will continue to simulcast TBS' games on its ad-free tier.
- Apple TV will continue to stream Friday Night Baseball.
- Netflix will air a game on Opening Night, the MLB at Field of Dreams game, and the Home Run Derby.
- ESPN Unlimited will continue to stream games airing on ESPN. Additionally, the service will stream daily games that are blacked out in home markets. MLB.tv will also be integrated into the ESPN App.
- Peacock will exclusively air the remainder of Sunday Night Baseball and Sunday Leadoff games, along with all games on July 5. Peacock will also stream daily games that are blacked out in home markets and a whiparound show every Sunday following Sunday Leadoff and simulcast all NBC games.
- Fox One will simulcast in-market and national Fox games along with all FS1 games.

==== Local ====
On March 3, 2025, the Orioles and Nationals reached a settlement to end the teams' dispute over television rights fee payments. MASN, which is owned and operated by the Orioles but airs both teams' games, pays rights fees to the Nationals. Through the settlement, the Nationals' agreement with the Orioles and MASN will end following the 2025 season. The Nationals have not yet announced a new local television agreement.

On September 8, 2025, the Mets and Nexstar Media Group announced a new agreement to air games over-the-air through the 2028 season. Nexstar stations will exclusively air 30 Mets games locally, including five spring training games. Long time flagship WPIX will continue to air these games, alongside Nexstar stations in Albany, Binghamton, Syracuse, Utica, and Hartford.

Root Sports, the television home of the Mariners since 1993, announced it would shut down following the 2025 season. MLB Local Media, which produced Mariners games for Root Sports in 2025, will replace Root as the Mariners local broadcaster.
