= Major League Baseball on television =

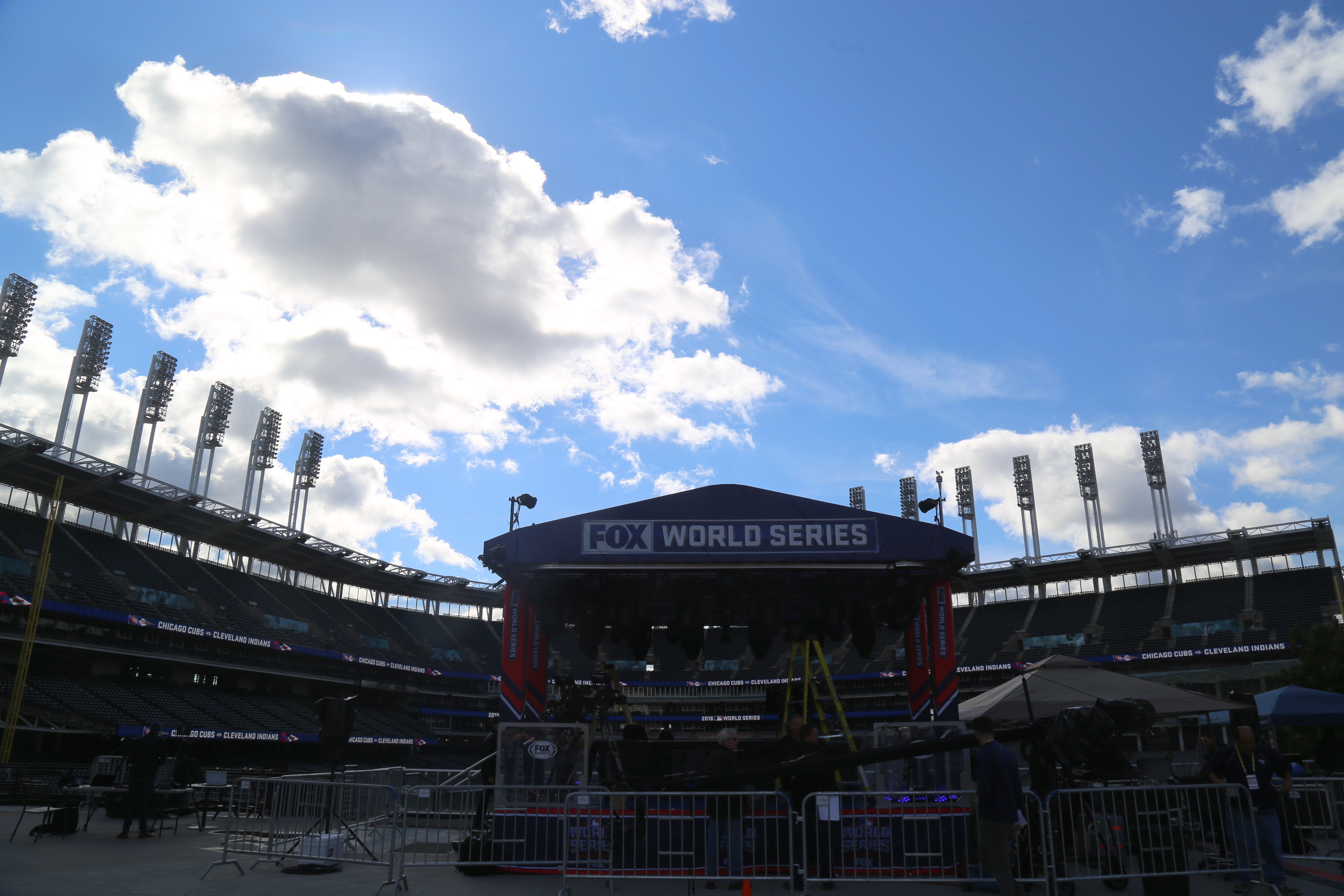
The MLB on Fox pre and post-game broadcast set at Progressive Field in Cleveland, Ohio during its coverage of the 2016 World Series

Major League Baseball (MLB) has been broadcast on American television since the 1950s, with initial broadcasts on the experimental station W2XBS, the predecessor of the modern WNBC in New York City. The World Series was televised on a networked basis since 1947, with regular season games broadcast nationally since 1953. Over the following years, MLB games became major attractions for American television networks, and each of the Big Three networks (ABC, CBS and NBC) would air packages of baseball games at various times. Fox would rise to major network status, partially on its acquisition of MLB rights in 1996; Fox has been MLB's primary broadcast television partner ever since.

MLB broadcasts would later shape the emerging medium of cable television. In particular, out-of-market baseball would attract customers to superstations in the late 20th century, such as WGN and WTBS airing Chicago Cubs and Atlanta Braves games, respectively. MLB also played a big role in the growth of ESPN since it began airing games in 1990. TBS, the national feed spun off from WTBS, has also aired nationally televised games since 2007. MLB itself launched its own cable network in 2009, MLB Network, which would also air several live games a week. And MLB broadcasts have been shown on Fox's various sister cable networks, with Fox Sports 1 airing games since 2014.

MLB began streaming games via the Internet in 2017, with Twitter and Facebook initially acquiring the rights to some games. YouTube and The Roku Channel have since streamed games, and beginning in 2026, Apple TV, Peacock, and Netflix will hold packages of MLB games.

Games not picked up by one of the national outlets are instead broadcast by local broadcast stations and regional sports networks, televising their respective local team within their respective region. A number of nationally televised games are also non-exclusive, meaning that the national telecasts may also air in tandem with those of the game by local broadcasters.

As the only team in Canada, the television rights to the Toronto Blue Jays are a special case: Blue Jays games are aired nationally in that country with Sportsnet holding the rights since 1999. Sportsnet also carries other MLB games simulcast from a U.S. feed.

== National television broadcasters ==
=== United States ===
==== Terrestrial television ====
- ABC: 1948–1950; 1953–1954; 1959–1961; 1965; 1976–1989; 2020–2025 (Wild Card Series only except for one game in 2021); 2026–present (select regular season games only)
- The Baseball Network (a joint venture between Major League Baseball, ABC and NBC): 1994–1995
- CBS: 1947–1951; 1955–1965; 1990–1993
- DuMont 1947–1949
- Fox: 1996–present
  - Baseball Night in America: 2012–present
- NBC: 1947–1989; 1996–2000 (postseason games only; All-Star Games in 1996, 1998, and 2000); 2022–2023 (one game only per season); 2026–present
- UniMás: 2024–present

==== Cable television ====
- ABC Family Channel: 2002
- ESPN: 1990–present
- Fox Family Channel: 2001
- Fox Sports Net: 1997–2001
- Fox Sports 1: 2014–present
- FX: 1997–2001
- MLB Network: 2009–present
- NBCSN: 2026–present
- TBS: 2007–present
- TUDN: 2024–present
- USA Network: 1979–1983

==== Internet television ====
- Apple TV+: 2022–present
- Facebook: 2017–2019
- HBO Max (simulcast of games on TBS): 2023–present
- Peacock: 2021 (Phillies vs Giants series); 2022–2023, 2026–present
- Twitter: 2017–2018
- YouTube: 2019–2022
- The Roku Channel: 2024–2025
- Fox One: (simulcast of games on Fox and FS1) 2025–present
- ESPN: (simulcast of games on ESPN networks) 2025–present
- Netflix: 2026–present

==== Timeline ====
| Timeslot | Network(s) | Years |
|---|---|---|
| Sunday morning | NBC, Peacock | 2022–2023 |
| Sunday morning | The Roku Channel | 2024–2025 |
| Sunday morning | NBC, NBCSN, Telemundo, TeleXitos, Universo, Peacock | 2026–present |
| Sunday afternoon | CBS | 1958–1965 |
| Sunday afternoon | NBC | 1959–1964 |
| Sunday afternoon | ABC | 1979–1987 |
| Sunday afternoon | NBC | 1987 |
| Sunday afternoon | CBS | 1990–1991 |
| Sunday afternoon | TBS | 2008–2021 |
| Sunday afternoon | ABC, ESPN, ESPN Deportes, ESPN DTC | 2026–present |
| Sunday night | ESPN | 1990–2025 |
| Sunday night | ABC | 2021 (one game only) |
| Sunday night | ESPN2 | 2022–2025 |
| Sunday night | NBC, NBCSN, Telemundo, TeleXitos, Universo, Peacock | 2026–present |
| Monday night | NBC | 1966–1975 |
| Monday night | ABC | 1976–1988 |
| Monday night | ESPN | 1992–2022, 2024 |
| Monday night | The Baseball Network (ABC) | 1994–1995 |
| Monday night | FX | 1997 |
| Monday night | MLB Network | 2009, 2014, 2016–2017, 2019–present |
| Monday night | Fox Sports 1 | 2016, 2020–present |
| Monday night | ESPN, ESPN Deportes, ESPN DTC | 2026–present |
| Tuesday night | ESPN | 1990–1997 |
| Tuesday night | FX | 1997–1998 |
| Tuesday night | Fox Sports 1 | 2014–2021 |
| Tuesday night | TBS, HBO Max | 2022–2023 |
| Tuesday night | TBS, TruTV, UniMás, TUDN, HBO Max | 2024–present |
| Wednesday night | ESPN | 1990–present |
| Wednesday night | Fox Sports 1 | 2020–present |
| Wednesday night | MLB Network | 2022–present |
| Thursday night | USA | 1979–1983 |
| Thursday night | ABC | 1989 |
| Thursday night | Fox Sports Net | 1997–1999 |
| Thursday night | Fox Family Channel | 2000–2001 |
| Thursday night | ESPN | 2003–2006 |
| Thursday night | MLB Network | 2009–present |
| Thursday night | ESPN | 2017–present |
| Thursday night | Fox | 2019–present |
| Friday night | ESPN | 1990–1993 |
| Friday night | The Baseball Network (NBC) | 1994–1995 |
| Friday night | Apple TV | 2022–present |
| Saturday morning | NBC | 1957–1964 |
| Saturday morning | ABC | 1960 |
| Saturday morning | ABC | 1965 |
| Saturday afternoon | ABC | 1953–1954 |
| Saturday afternoon | CBS | 1955–1965 |
| Saturday afternoon | NBC | 1966–1989 |
| Saturday afternoon | CBS | 1990–1993 |
| Saturday afternoon | Fox, Fox Deportes | 1996–2013 |
| Saturday afternoon | Fox, Fox Sports 1, Fox Deportes | 2014–2024 |
| Saturday afternoon | Fox, Fox Sports 1, Fox Deportes, Fox One | 2025–present |
| Saturday afternoon | ABC, ESPN, ESPN Deportes, ESPN DTC | 2026–present |
| Saturday night | The Baseball Network (ABC) | 1994–1995 |
| Saturday night | FX | 2000–2001 |
| Saturday night | Fox, Fox Deportes | 2012–2024 |
| Saturday night | Fox, Fox Deportes, Fox One | 2025–present |

=== Canada ===
Sportsnet and Réseau des sports (RDS) are the current national rightsholders in English and French respectively to Major League Baseball and both air a variety of regular-season games (which do not always correspond to those carried nationally in the U.S.) as well as the All-Star Game and the postseason. In the past these rights were held by The Score (2001–2002), TSN (1990–2000) and CTV (1981–1996). In 2010, Sportsnet began subleasing its rights to Sunday Night Baseball to rival TSN2 in return for TSN yielding its remaining rights to Toronto Blue Jays games to Sportsnet.

As presently the only MLB team in Canada, all Blue Jays games are also aired nationally in that country. These rights are negotiated by the team itself, not MLB, with all games currently airing on the co-owned Sportsnet and Sportsnet One in English, while TVA Sports has French-language rights to selected Blue Jays games. Games that are designated as exclusive to digital platforms (in Canada, this involves games airing on Apple TV+) are the only Blue Jays games that do not air on the Sportsnet channels. Other Canadian broadcasters have carried these games in the past, with TSN being the team's main carrier from 1984 to 1998 (and in a lesser role until 2009), and CBC and CTV also providing national coverage of some games at various points over the course of the team's history.

Up until 2022, the Blue Jays' television rightsholders were not allowed to produce their own broadcasts during postseason play, as they were considered a regional broadcaster at the time. For example, during the Blue Jays' runs to the 1992 and 1993 World Series, their television partners carried the CBS feed. This remained true even after Sportsnet became the team's broadcaster, as their 2015 and 2016 postseason runs were simulcasts of Fox and TBS' feeds respectively. This is in contrast to the NBA's Toronto Raptors (via TSN and Sportsnet), as well as the NHL and MLS's Canadian-based teams (via Hockey Night in Canada on CBC and Sportsnet, and TSN respectively) who were allowed to produce their own broadcasts during postseason games. In 2022, however, MLB allowed Sportsnet to carry its own production of Blue Jays postseason games as it is now considered a national broadcaster.

=== United Kingdom ===
Major League Baseball has been broadcast on a regular basis in the UK since the 1980s. Initially shown on Channel 4, it was also aired on satellite channel Screensport and following Screensport's closure in March 1993, Sky Sports took over as the UK's broadcaster.

In 1997, newly launched terrestrial broadcaster Channel 5 took over as the rights holder, showing two games a week, including Sunday Night Baseball, under the title of MLB on Five. After the 2008 season, Channel 5 decided to end its coverage of Major League Baseball due to the Great Recession.

In 2006, NASN bought the rights to show ten live Major League Baseball games a week. and in 2009 NASN is renamed ESPN America following the sale in late 2006 of the channel to ESPN.

In 2013 BT Sport launched and picked up the rights held by ESPN UK, which included Major League Baseball. BT Sport showed MLB throughout its decade on air, broadcasting many games each week. This was supplemented by ESPN-produced baseball magazine shows, including Baseball Tonight.

In 2023, TNT Sports replaced BT Sport and it continues to air Major League Baseball, but without the ESPN-produced programming.

Since 2019, a small number of games have been broadcast by the BBC. This began when the Corporation aired coverage of the inaugural MLB London Series. In 2022, the BBC signed a new deal for the London Series, and this also gave the BBC rights to show games played in America for the first time.

== History ==
=== First broadcast ===
After the 1939 World's Fair showed the new technology called television, experimental station W2XBS aired the first televised major league baseball games, a double header between the Cincinnati Reds and the Brooklyn Dodgers on August 26, 1939.

=== 1953–1959 ===
In 1953, ABC executive Edgar J. Scherick (who would later go on to create Wide World of Sports) approached MLB with a Saturday Game of the Week. With fewer outlets than CBS or NBC, ABC needed paid programming (or "anything for bills" as Scherick put it). At first, ABC hesitated at the idea of a nationally televised regular season baseball program, but gave Scherick the green light to sign up teams; unfortunately, only three (the Philadelphia Athletics, Cleveland Indians, and Chicago White Sox were interested. To make matters worse, Major League Baseball barred the Game of the Week from airing within fifty miles of any big-league city. According to Scherick, Major League Baseball insisted on protecting local coverage and didn't care about national appeal. ABC though, did care about the national appeal and claimed that "most of America was still up for grabs."

CBS took over the Saturday Game in 1955 (the rights were actually set up through the Falstaff Brewing Corporation,) retaining Dizzy Dean and Buddy Blattner as the announcers and adding Sunday coverage in 1957.

In 1959, ABC broadcast the best-of-three playoff series (to decide the National League pennant) between Milwaukee Braves and Los Angeles Dodgers. The cigarette company L&M was in charge of all of the telecasts.

=== 1960–1965 ===
In 1960, ABC returned to baseball broadcasting with a series of late-afternoon Saturday games. Jack Buck and Carl Erskine were the lead announcing crew for this series, which lasted one season.

ABC typically did three games a week. Two of the games were always from the Eastern or Central Time Zone. The late games (no doubleheaders) were usually San Francisco Giants or Los Angeles Dodgers' home games. However, the Milwaukee Braves used to start many of their Saturday home games late in the afternoon. So if the Giants and Dodgers were both the road at the same time, ABC still would be able to show a late game.

By 1964, CBS' Dizzy Dean and Pee Wee Reese worked Yankee Stadium, Wrigley Field, St. Louis, Philadelphia, and Baltimore. New York got $550,000 of CBS' $895,000. Six clubs that exclusively played nationally televised games on NBC got $1.2 million.

On July 17, 1964, a game out of Los Angeles between the Chicago Cubs and Los Angeles Dodgers contest became the first Pay TV baseball game. Subscription television offered the cablecast to subscribers for money. (The Dodgers beat the Cubs by the score of 3–2, with Don Drysdale collecting 10 strikeouts.)

ABC paid $5.7 million for the rights to the 28 Saturday/holiday Games of the Week. ABC's deal covered all of the teams except the New York Yankees and Philadelphia Phillies (who had their own television deals) and called for two regionalized games on Saturdays, Independence Day, and Labor Day. ABC blacked out the games in the home cities of the clubs playing those games.

=== 1966–1975 ===
On October 19, 1965, NBC signed a three-year contract with Major League Baseball. The year before, NBC lost the rights to the Saturday–Sunday Game of the Week. In addition, the previous deal limited CBS to covering only 12 weekends when its new subsidiary, the New York Yankees, played at home. The new package under NBC called for 28 games compared to 1960's three-network 123.

Under the new deal, NBC paid roughly $6 million per year for the 25 Games of the Week, $6.1 million for the 1967 World Series and 1967 All-Star Game, and $6.5 million for the 1968 World Series and 1968 All-Star Game. This brought the total value of the contract (which included three Monday night telecasts) up to $30.6 million.

By 1969, Major League Baseball had grown to 24 teams and the net local television revenues had leaped to $20.7 million. This is in sharp contrast to 1950 when local television brought the then 16 Major League clubs a total net income of $2.3 million. Changes baseball underwent during this time, such as expansion franchises and increasing the schedule from 154 games to 162, led to a wider audience for network and local television.

From 1972–1975 NBC televised Monday games under a contract worth $72 million. In 1973, NBC extended the Monday night telecasts (with a local blackout) to 15 straight. On September 1, 1975, NBC's last Monday Night Baseball game, in which the Montreal Expos beat the host Philadelphia Phillies 6–5.

In the aftermath of the 1975 World Series, attendance figures, television contracts (this time including two networks, NBC and now ABC), and player salaries all soared. In the eyes of some, that particular World Series restored baseball as America's national pastime (ahead of football).

=== 1976–1989: ABC and NBC alternate coverage ===
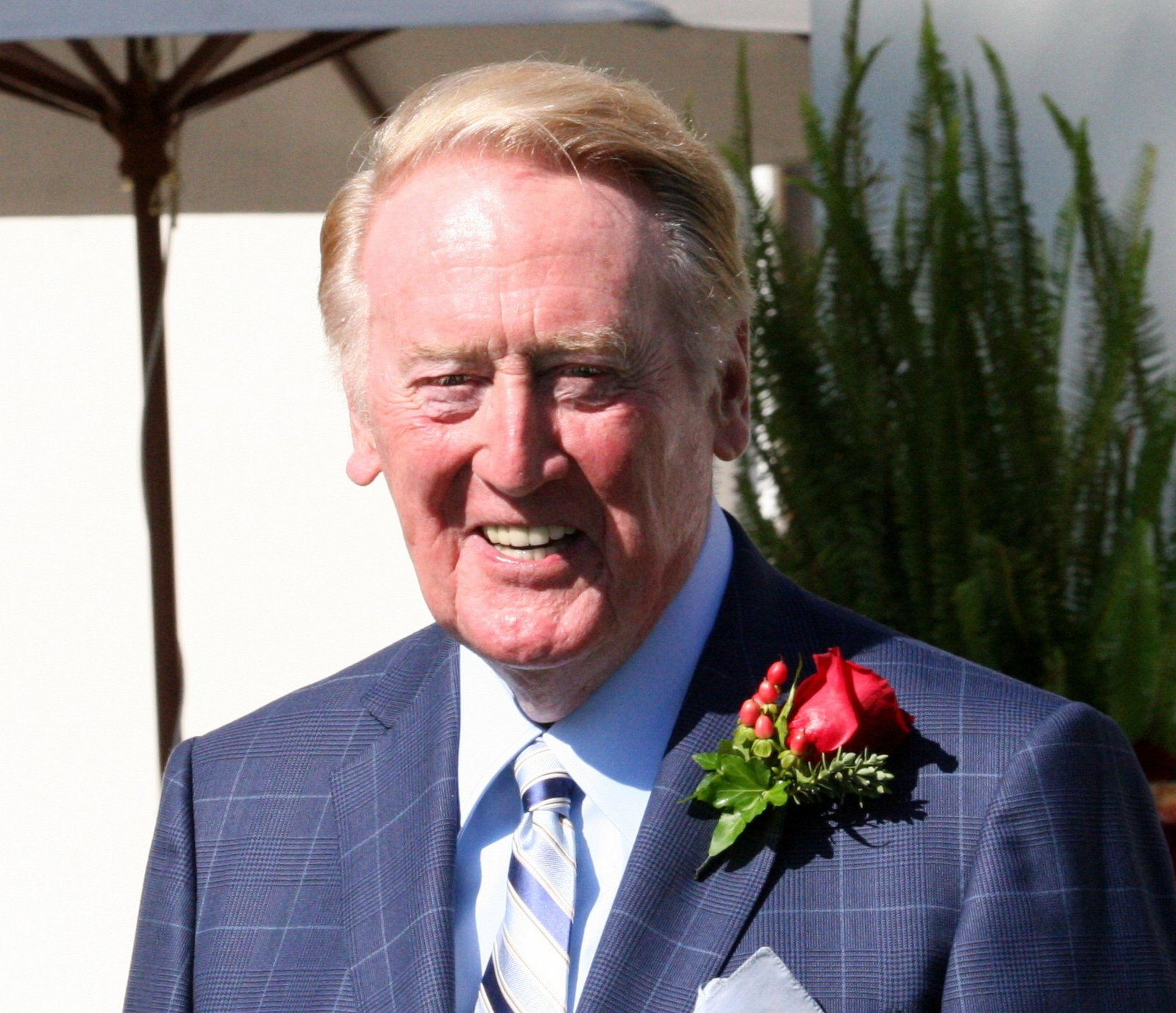
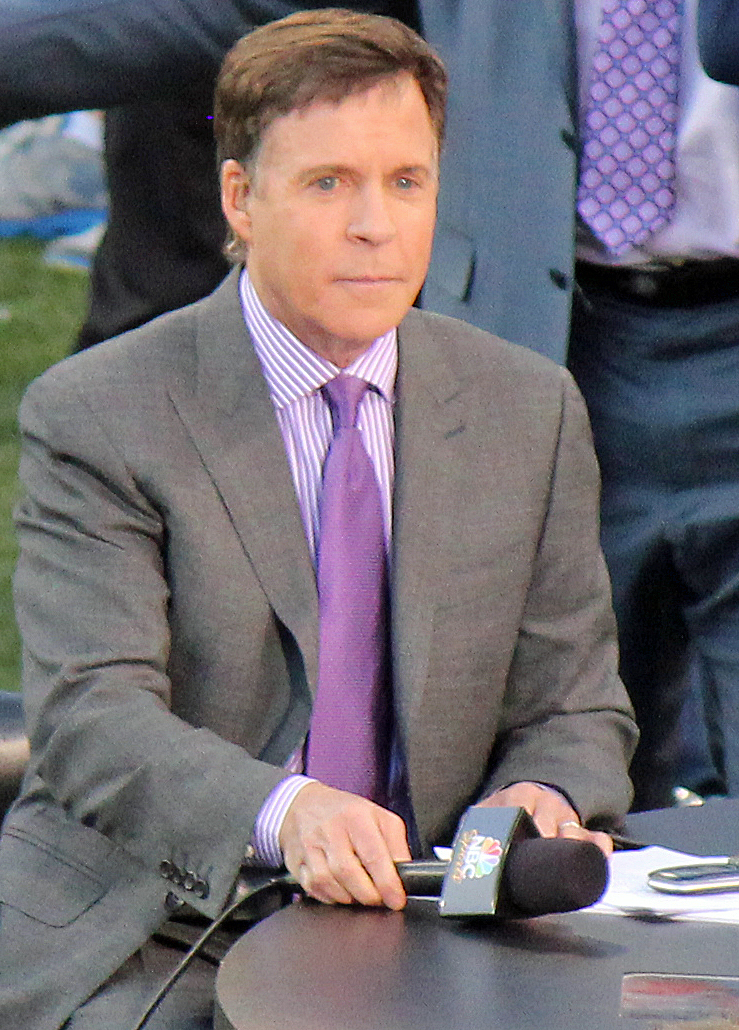
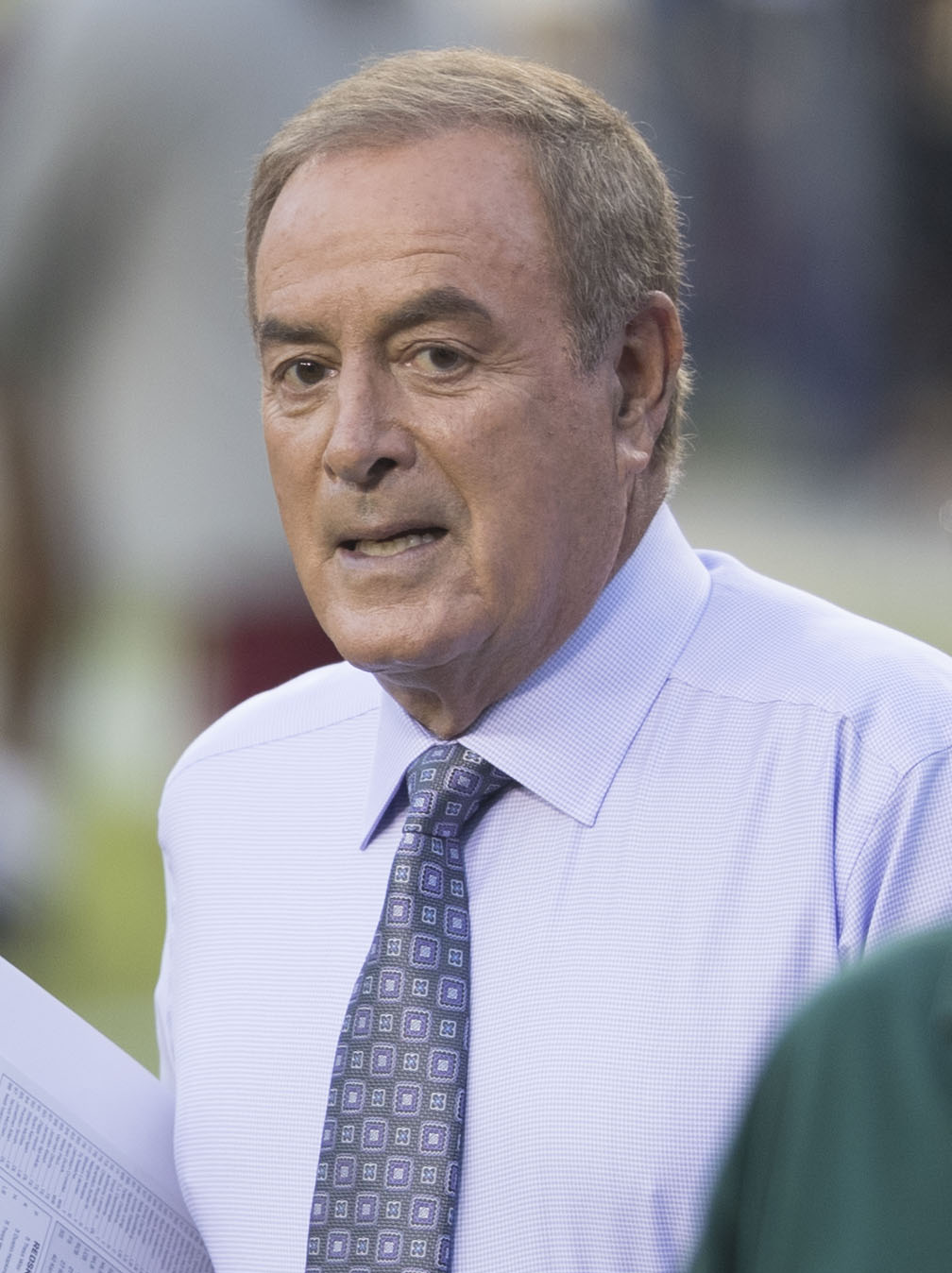
Vin Scully (left) and Bob Costas (center) called NBC's Game of the Week while Al Michaels (right) called ABC's Monday Night Baseball for much of the 1980s.

Under the initial agreement with ABC, NBC, and Major League Baseball (1976–1979), the two networks paid a combined $92.8 million. ABC paid $12.5 million per year to show 16 Monday night games in 1976, 18 in the next three years, plus half the postseason (the League Championship Series in even numbered years and World Series in odd numbered years). NBC paid $10.7 million per year to show 25 Saturday Games of the Week and the other half of the postseason (the League Championship Series in odd numbered years and World Series in even numbered years).

Major League Baseball media director John Lazarus said of the new arrangement between NBC and ABC "Ratings couldn't get more from one network so we approached another." NBC's Joe Garagiola wasn't very fond of new broadcasting arrangement at first saying "I wished they hadn't got half the package. Still, Game, half of the postseason – we got lots left." By 1980, income from television accounted for a record 30% of the game's $500 million in revenues.

In the 1970s the cable revolution began. The Atlanta Braves became a power contender with greater revenues generated by WTBS. Ted Turner's Atlanta-based station obtained first local rights to the Braves in the early 1970s. Turner would buy the team a few years later and then greatly expand the reach of WTBS by up-linking it to satellite. WTBS became the first Superstation, and starting with the 1977 season "America's Team" was broadcast to cable households nationwide.

In 1980, 22 teams (all but the Atlanta Braves, Houston Astros, New York Mets, and St. Louis Cardinals) took part in a one-year cable deal with UA-Columbia. The deal involved the airing of a Thursday night Game of the Week in markets at least 50 miles (80 km) from a major league park. The deal earned Major League Baseball less than $500,000, but led to a new two-year contract for 40–45 games per season.

On April 7, 1983, Major League Baseball, ABC, and NBC agreed to terms of a six-year television package worth $1.2 billion. The two networks would continue to alternate coverage of the playoffs (ABC in even numbered years and NBC in odd numbered years), World Series (ABC would televise the World Series in odd numbered years and NBC in even numbered years), and All-Star Game (ABC would televise the All-Star Game in even numbered years and NBC in odd numbered years) through the 1989 season, with each of the 26 clubs receiving $7 million per year in return (even if no fans showed up). The last package gave each club $1.9 million per year. ABC contributed $575 million for regular season prime time and Sunday afternoons and NBC paid $550 million for thirty Saturday afternoon games.

By 1986, ABC only televised 13 Monday Night Baseball games. This was a fairly sharp contrast to the 18 games that were scheduled in 1978. The Sporting News believed that ABC paid Major League Baseball to not make them televise the regular season. TSN added that the network only wanted the sport for October anyway.

==== Breakdown ====
- 1983 – $20 million in advance from the two networks.
- 1984 – NBC $70 million, ABC $56 million, total $126 million.
- 1985 – NBC $61 million, ABC $75 million, total $136 million.

Note: The networks got $9 million when Major League Baseball expanded the League Championship Series from a best-of-five to a best-of-seven in 1985.

- 1986 – NBC $75 million, ABC $66 million, total $141 million.
- 1987 – NBC $81 million, ABC $90 million, total $171 million.
- 1988 – NBC $90 million, ABC $96 million, total $186 million.
- 1989 – NBC $106 million, ABC $125 million, total $231 million.

=== Major League Baseball on CBS and ESPN: 1990–1993 ===
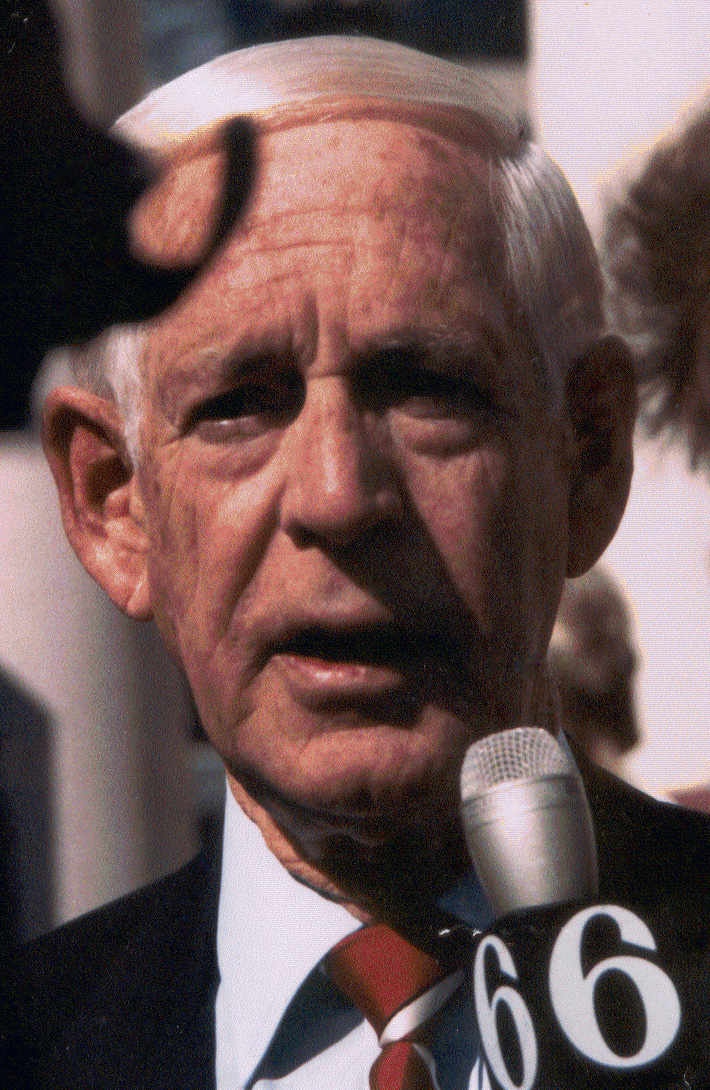
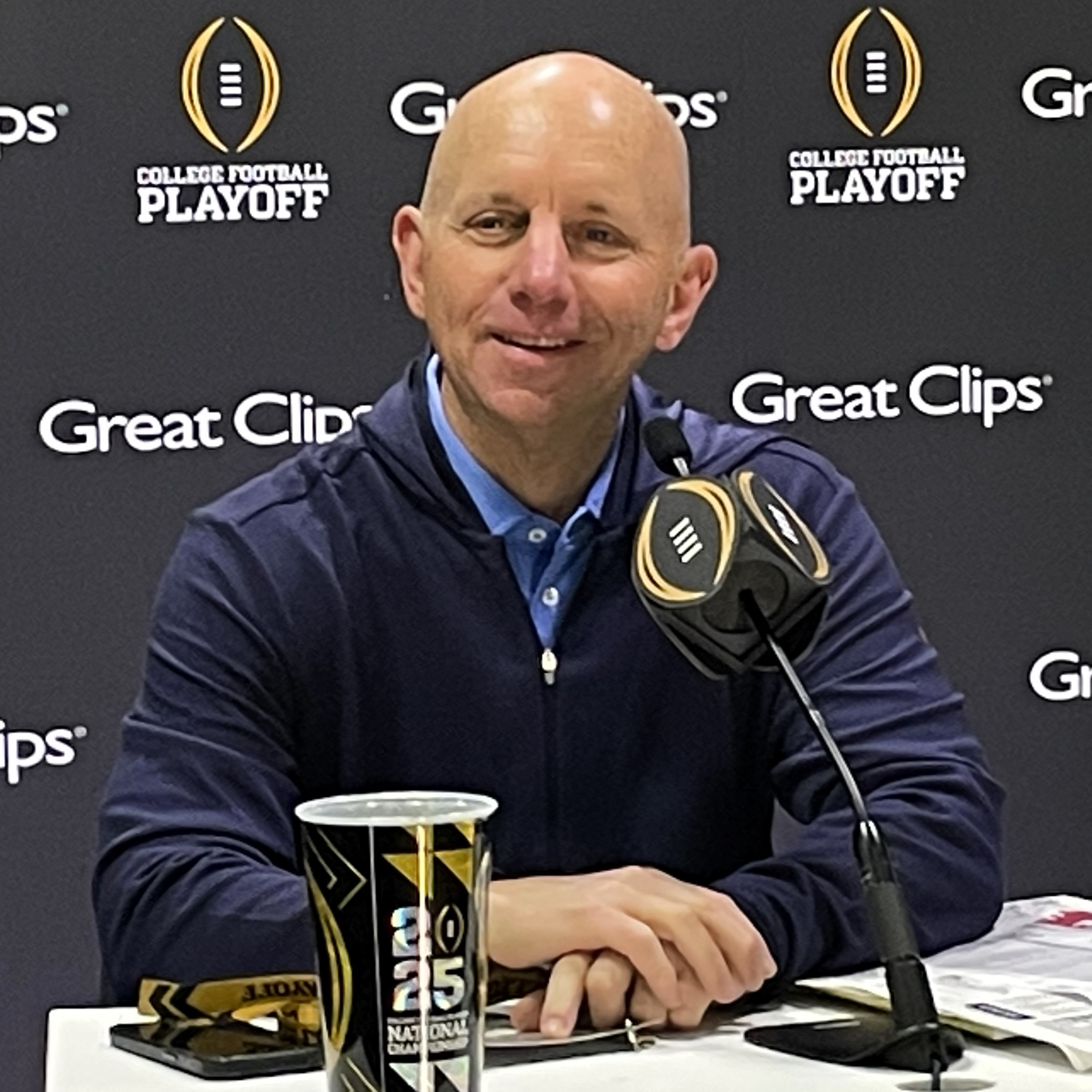
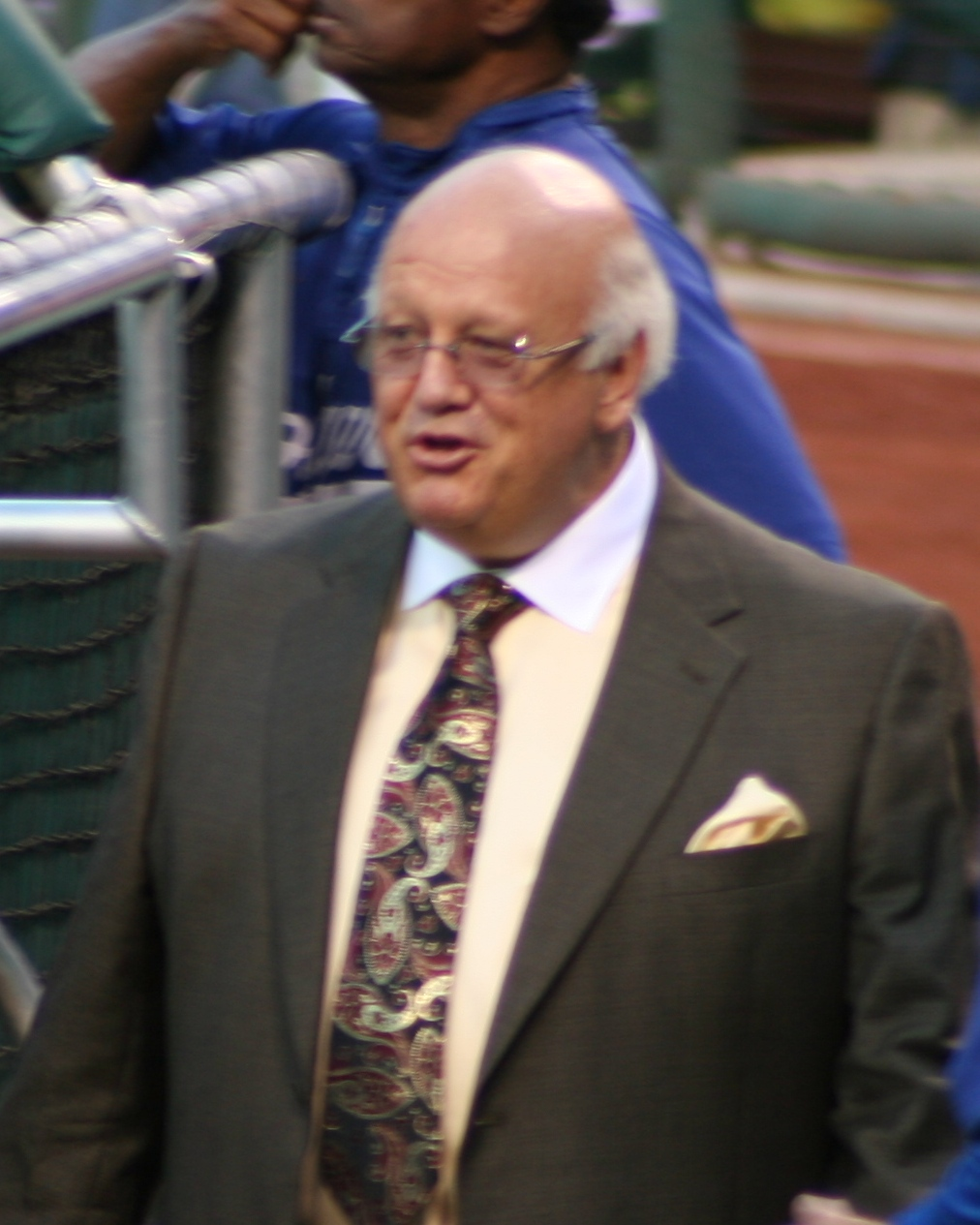
Jack Buck (left) and Sean McDonough (center) called the World Series for CBS in the early 1990s. Jon Miller (right) called ESPN's Sunday Night Baseball from 1990 to 2010.

On December 14, 1988, CBS (under the guidance of Commissioner Peter Ueberroth) paid approximately $1.8 billion for exclusive television rights for over four years (beginning in 1990). CBS paid about $265 million each year for the World Series, League Championship Series, All-Star Game, and the Saturday Game of the Week. It was one of the largest agreements (to date) between the sport of baseball and the business of broadcasting.

The deal with CBS was also supposed to pay each team $10 million a year. A separate deal with cable television would bring each team an additional $4 million. Each team could also cut its own deal with local television. For example, the New York Yankees signed with a cable network (MSG) that would pay the team $41 million annually for 12 years. Radio broadcast rights can bring in additional money. Reportedly, after the huge television contracts with CBS and ESPN were signed, franchises spent their excess millions on free agents. In the end, CBS wound up losing approximately half a billion dollars from their television contract with Major League Baseball. CBS repeatedly asked Major League Baseball for a rebate, but MLB wasn't willing to do this.

On January 5, 1989, Major League Baseball signed a $400 million deal with ESPN, who would show over 175 games beginning in 1990. For the next four years, ESPN would televise six games a week (Sunday, Wednesday Night Baseball, doubleheaders on Tuesdays and Fridays, plus holidays).

The roll out of ESPN, followed by Fox Sports, changed sports news and particularly affected baseball. With games condensed to the thirty-second highlight reel, and the added microscope of news organizations that needed to fill 24 hours of time, the amount of attention paid to major league players magnified to staggering levels compared to where it had been just 20 years prior. It brought with it increased attention for individual players, who reached superstar status nationwide on careers that often were not as compelling as those who had come before them in a less media intense time. This coincided with the rise of television revenues on both a local and national level: by 1993, local television revenue alone surpassed $618 million, which was 15 times greater than it had been in the early 1970s. Accordingly, in the same time period – coupled with free agency and arbitration rights – the average player salary rose roughly tenfold to over $1.3 million.

On April 15, 1990, ESPN's Sunday Night Baseball with the experienced Jon Miller and Joe Morgan debuted. In its first year, Sunday Night Baseball averaged a 3.0 rating. That was double the number that ESPN as a whole was averaging at the time (1.5). By 1998, ESPN enjoyed its largest baseball audience ever (a 9.5 Nielsen rating) as Mark McGwire hit his 61st home run of the season.

=== The Baseball Network: 1994–1995 ===
After the fall-out from CBS' financial problems from their four-year-long television contract with Major League Baseball, MLB decided to go into the business of producing the telecasts themselves. After a four-year hiatus, ABC and NBC returned to Major League Baseball under the umbrella of a revenue-sharing venture called The Baseball Network.

Under a six-year plan, Major League Baseball was intended to receive 85% of the first $140 million in advertising revenue (or 87.5% of advertising revenues and corporate sponsorship from the games until sales top a specified level), 50% of the next $30 million, and 80% of any additional money. Prior to this, Major League Baseball was projected to take a projected 55% cut in rights fees and receive a typical rights fee from the networks. When compared to the previous television deal with CBS, The Baseball Network was supposed to bring in 50% less of the broadcasting revenue. The advertisers were reportedly excited about the arrangement with The Baseball Network because the new package included several changes intended to boost ratings, especially among younger viewers.

Arranging broadcasts through The Baseball Network seemed, on the surface, to benefit NBC and ABC since it gave them a monopoly on broadcasting Major League Baseball. It also stood to benefit the networks because they reduced the risk associated with purchasing the broadcast rights outright. NBC and ABC attempted to create a loss-free environment for each other.

After NBC's coverage of the 1994 All-Star Game was complete, NBC was scheduled to televise six regular season games on Fridays or Saturdays in prime time. The networks had exclusive rights for the 12 regular season dates, in that no regional or national cable service or over-the-air broadcaster may telecast an MLB game on those dates. Baseball Night in America usually aired up to 14 games based on the viewers' region (affiliates chose games of local interest to carry) as opposed to a traditional coast-to-coast format. ABC would then pick up where NBC left off by televising six more regular season games. The regular season games fell under the Baseball Night in America umbrella which premiered on July 16, 1994.

In even numbered years, NBC would have the rights to the All-Star Game and both League Championship Series while ABC would have the World Series and newly created Division Series. In odd numbered years the postseason and All-Star Game television rights were supposed to alternate.

The long-term plans for The Baseball Network crumbled when the players went on strike on August 12, 1994 (thus forcing the cancellation of the World Series). In July 1995, ABC and NBC, who wound up having to share the duties of televising the 1995 World Series as a way to recoup (with ABC broadcasting Games 1, 4, 5 (and 7 had there been one), and NBC broadcasting Games 2, 3, and 6), announced that they were opting out of their agreement with Major League Baseball. Both networks figured that as the delayed 1995 baseball season opened without a labor agreement, there was no guarantee against another strike. Others would argue that a primary reason for its failure was its abandoning of localized markets in favor of more lucrative and stable advertising contracts afforded by turning to a national model of broadcasting. Both networks soon publicly vowed to cut all ties with Major League Baseball for the remainder of the 20th century.

In the end, the venture would lose $95 million in advertising and nearly $500 million in national and local spending.

Also in 1994, ESPN renewed its baseball contract for six years (through the 1999 season). The new deal was worth $42.5 million per year and $255 million overall. The deal was ultimately voided after the 1995 season and ESPN was pretty much forced to restructure their contract.

=== Baseball comes to Fox and stays with NBC: 1996–2000 ===
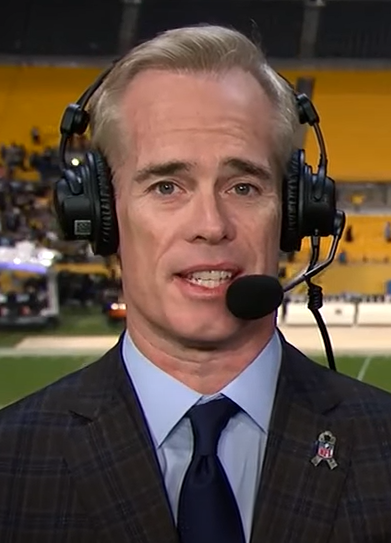
Joe Buck called the World Series on Fox from 1996 to 2021.

Soon after the Baseball Network fiasco, Major League Baseball made a deal with Fox and NBC on November 7, 1995. Fox paid a fraction less of the amount of money that CBS paid for the Major League Baseball television rights. Unlike The Baseball Network, Fox went back to the tried and true format of televising regular season games (approximately 16 weekly telecasts that normally began on Memorial Day weekend) on Saturday afternoons. Fox did however, continue a format that The Baseball Network started by offering games based purely on a viewer's region. Fox's approach has usually been to offer four regionalized telecasts, with exclusivity from 1–4 p.m. in each time zone. When Fox first got into baseball, it used the motto "Same game, new attitude."

Under the five-year deal (from 1996–2000) for a total of approximately $400 million, NBC didn't televise any regular season games. Instead, NBC only handled the All-Star Game and the American League Championship Series in even numbered years and the World Series and National League Championship Series in odd numbered years, in addition to three Division Series games in each of these five years.

Also in 1996, ESPN began a five-year contract with Major League Baseball worth $440 million and about $80 million per year. ESPN paid for the rights to a Wednesday doubleheader and the Sunday night Game of the Week, as well as all postseason games not aired on Fox or NBC. Major League Baseball staggered the times of first-round games to provide a full-day feast for viewers: ESPN could air games at 1 p.m., 4 p.m., and 11 p.m. EDT, with the broadcast networks telecasting the prime time game.

1996 also marked the launch of MLB's out-of-market sports package, MLB Extra Innings. Debuted exclusively on DirecTV, the service allowed fans to watch regionally televised broadcasts of out-of-market baseball games.

Beginning in 1997, Fox entered a four-year joint venture with Liberty Media Cable (which resulted in the placement of a Thursday night baseball game on Fox Sports Net alongside an FX Saturday night game, Fox Family would later replace Fox Sports Net) worth $172 million. The deal called for two games a week that aired games on its choice of two weeknights other than Wednesday, with no exclusivity.

=== 2001–2006: Fox and ESPN ===
In September 2000, Major League Baseball signed a six-year, $2.5 billion contract with Fox to show Saturday baseball, the All-Star Game, selected Division Series games and exclusive coverage of both League Championship Series and the World Series. Fox's sister network FX also aired numerous Major League Baseball contests on Saturday nights in 2001.

Under the previous five-year deal with NBC (1996–2000), Fox paid $115 million while NBC only paid $80 million per year. Fox paid about $575 million overall while NBC paid about $400 million overall. The difference between the Fox and the NBC contracts implicitly values Fox's Saturday Game of the Week at less than $90 million for five years. Before NBC officially decided to part ways with Major League Baseball (for the second time in about 12 years) on September 26, 2000, Fox's payment would've been $345 million while NBC would've paid $240 million. Before 1990, NBC had carried Major League Baseball since 1947.

We have notified Major League Baseball that we have passed on their offer and we wish them well going forward.

— NBC Sports president Ken Schanzer

NBC Sports chairman Dick Ebersol added that it wasn't cost-effective for NBC to be putting out the kind of money that Major League Baseball wanted.

ESPN and ESPN2 also had contracts (which were signed in 2000 and ran through 2005) to show selected weeknight and Sunday night games, along with selected Division Series playoff games. The contracts with ESPN were worth $141.8 million per year and $851 million overall. After Disney bought Fox Family (who from 2000–2001 aired Thursday night games) in 2002 to become ABC Family, the Division Series games aired on ABC Family (with ESPN's announcers, graphics, and music) for one year. ESPN then added the extra playoff games and Thursday night package to its lineup.

In 2002, Major League Baseball launched Mlb.tv, its digital out-of-market sports package, with a game between the Texas Rangers and the New York Yankees on August 26.

=== Fox, Fox Sports 1, TBS and ESPN era: 2007–2016 ===
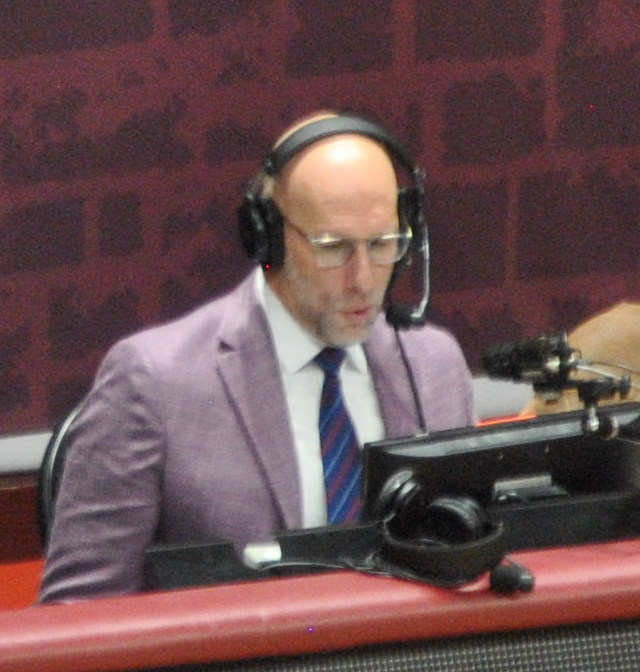
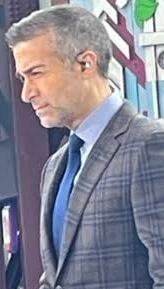
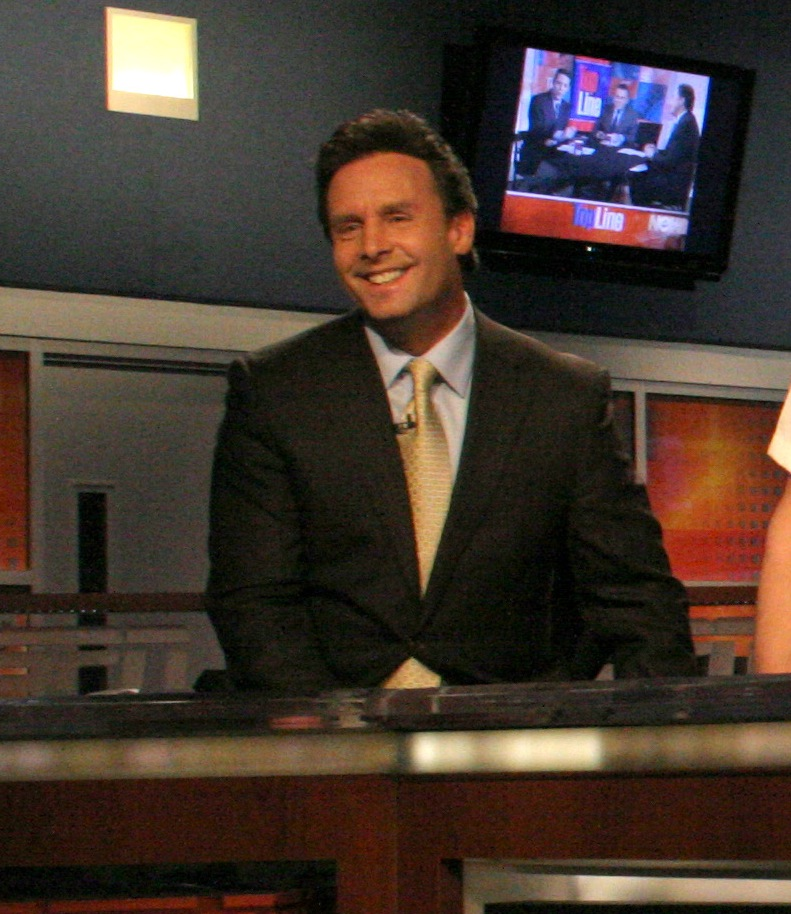
Dan Shulman (left, 2011–2017), Matt Vasgersian (center, 2018–2021) and Karl Ravech (right, 2022–2025) served as announcers of ESPN's Sunday Night Baseball after the departure of Jon Miller in 2010.

OLN (later NBC Sports Network) was briefly considering picking up the rights to Sunday and Wednesday regular season games, which expired after the 2005 season. In September 2005, however, ESPN, then the current rights holder, signed an eight-year contract with Major League Baseball, highlighted by the continuation of ESPN's Sunday Night Baseball series with additional, exclusive team appearances. The key details of the agreement were:

- Up to 80 regular-season telecasts per year;
- No blackout restrictions on exclusive Sunday Night Baseball; Monday Night Baseball, with ESPN mostly coexisting with local carriers
- Up to five appearances per team per year on the exclusive Sunday Night Baseball series, up from 11 over three years;
- Daily Baseball Tonight programs – one of ESPN's most popular series—including the continued right to show in-progress highlights and live cut-ins;
- MLB Home Run Derby, ESPN's highest-rated program of the summer and one of cable's best, and additional All-Star programming;
- Continuation of season-long Wednesday baseball on ESPN and ESPN2
- A new afternoon batting practice program, generally from the site of ESPN's Monday night telecast;
- For the first time, the 11 pm. ET SportsCenter presents a nightly Baseball Tonight update featuring in-progress highlights;
- Select games and MLB All-Star events on ESPN2 throughout the season;
- 10 spring training games and MLB Opening Day coverage;
- Telecast rights for ESPN, ESPN2, ESPN Deportes and ESPN International;
- Ability to include MLB programming as part of the delivery of the ESPN networks via cable, satellite and other new or developing technologies, such as cell phones and wireless devices;
- Archival footage and game programming and Instant Classic rights for ESPN Classic.

ESPN's Monday and Wednesday telecasts were mostly nonexclusive, meaning the games also can be televised by each club's local broadcasters. Wednesday games were blacked out in the teams' local markets (and anywhere their broadcasters reach), except if they would otherwise go untelevised. Monday games were usually saw ESPN co-exist with local broadcasters. The Sunday games remain on ESPN only.

The sport averages $296 million under the new agreement, a television and a baseball official said, speaking on condition of anonymity because of a confidentiality agreement in the deal. ESPN paid baseball $273.5 million in 2006, increasing to $293.5 million in each of the following four years, $308.5 million in 2011 and $306 million in each of the final two seasons.

After weeks of speculation and rumors, at the 2006 All-Star Game, Major League Baseball and the Fox Broadcasting Company announced a renewal of their contract through 2013. The contract would continue to give Fox exclusive rights to televise the World Series and the All-Star Game for the duration of the contract. The World Series would begin the Wednesday after the League Championship Series are completed. Fox would also get exclusive rights to televise the American League Championship Series in odd years beginning in 2007, and exclusive rights to televise the National League Championship Series in even years beginning in 2008. Additionally, Fox would have the right to broadcast its regional Saturday Game of the Week package for all 26 weeks (up from 18 under the previous contract).

Time Warner's TBS secured exclusive rights to televise the National League Championship Series in odd years beginning in 2007, and exclusive rights to televise the American League Championship Series in even years beginning in 2008. Turner's contract ran through 2013. As part of the contract, TBS relinquished its rights to air Atlanta Braves games nationally after the 2007 season, by separating WTBS (now WPCH) channel 17 from the TBS network, rebranding as Peachtree TV on October 1, 2007. The new station still aired Atlanta Braves games. Those games were made available to local cable and satellite operators in the Southeast for the 2008 season. Additionally, TBS gained rights to a Sunday afternoon Game of the Week, beginning in the 2008 season. TBS was allowed to choose the games that it will carry and select a single team up to 13 times. TBS also gained exclusive broadcast rights to the Division Series in both leagues, as well as any tiebreaking games. TBS also gained the rights to the All-Star Game Selection Show, meaning that ESPN (which previously carried it) can only broadcast the information after it airs on TBS.

In 2009, MLB launched its own cable network, MLB Network, which picked up its own game packages. MLB Network games typically air during nights on Tuesdays, Thursdays, Fridays, and Saturdays, as well as selected weekday afternoon games; these games are blacked out in areas where a local broadcaster is carrying the MLB Network game, with alternate games or programming provided in these markets.

In August 2012, it was announced that ESPN and Major League Baseball had agreed on a new eight-year deal that greatly increased the network's studio and game content across all of its platforms. The deal also increased ESPN's average yearly payment from about $360 million to approximately $700 million. ESPN returned to broadcasting postseason baseball beginning in 2014 with one of two wild-card games each season. The network alternated airing the American League and National League wild-card games each year. It also secured the rights to all potential regular-season tiebreaker games starting in 2014.

In September 2012, Sports Business Daily reported that Major League Baseball would agree to separate eight-year television deals with Fox Sports and Turner Sports through the 2021 season. Fox would reportedly pay around $4 billion over eight years (close to $500 million per year) while Turner would pay around $2.8 billion over eight years (more than $300 million per year). Under the new deals, Fox and TBS's coverage would essentially be the same as in the 2007–2013 contract with the exception of Fox and TBS splitting coverage of the Division Series, which TBS had broadcast exclusively dating back to 2007. More importantly, Fox would carry some of the games (such as the Saturday afternoon Game of the Week) on its all-sports channel, Fox Sports 1. Sources also said that was possible that Fox would sell some Division Series games to MLB Network, which did end up occurring.

On October 2, 2012, the new deal between Major League Baseball and Fox was officially confirmed.

- 12 Saturday afternoon games on Fox (down from 26).
- 40 games on cable outlets (Fox Sports 1; Fox Sports 2; FX or FXX for overflow).

MLB began streaming games via the internet (outside the MLB.tv platform) during the 2017 season. Twitter announced that it would stream weekly MLB games out-of-market on Fridays, with the first game on April 7 between the Chicago Cubs and Milwaukee Brewers. On May 18, Facebook followed with their own announcement of MLB games, streaming a Colorado Rockies-Cincinnati Reds game that evening. Twenty games, simulcasted from one of the local rightsholders, would be streamed on the platform during the 2017 season. Facebook opted to stream its games on Fridays, moving Twitter's live game presentations to Tuesdays. MLB later followed with a weekly exclusive game on Facebook for 2018, in addition to continuing its partnership with Twitter for the same season.

For the 2019 season, MLB scaled back its partnership with Facebook, limiting it to 6 non-exclusive games for the season. It later announced that YouTube would exclusively stream 13 weekly games in the second half of the season. YouTube would later air four games during the truncated 2020 season, before expanding to 21 games in 2021.

The expanded playoffs during the truncated 2020 season required a temporary deal for rights to the eight Wild Card Series. Under the deal, TBS aired one Wild Card Series (Toronto Blue Jays-Tampa Bay Rays), while the ESPN networks aired the remaining seven series. As part of the ESPN deals, ABC aired MLB games for the first time since 1995.

During the 2021 season, a three-game series played between June 18 and 20 between the Philadelphia Phillies and the San Francisco Giants, whose regional television rights are both held by the NBC Sports Regional Networks, aired nationally on NBC's streaming service Peacock. Later that season, ABC aired its first regular season MLB game since the 1990s, a presentation of ESPN's Sunday Night Baseball between the Chicago White Sox and the Chicago Cubs, on August 8.

=== 2022–2025: Fox Sports, TBS, ESPN, Apple TV+ and Peacock/Roku ===
On November 15, 2018, Fox renewed its rights, which were set to expire in 2022, through 2028. The contract maintains Fox's current coverage structure, but with expanded digital rights, and the commitment to air more games on the Fox broadcast network when the new deal takes effect. Fox also committed to airing at least two of its League Championship Series games, as well as any Game 7, on the broadcast network beginning in 2020; it had been criticized for airing only Game 1 of the 2019 American League Championship Series, while placing the rest on Fox Sports 1.

Turner Sports agreed to a seven-year deal to renew its MLB rights from 2022 through 2028; the deal was finalized in September 2020. As part of the new deals, Turner Sports moves its current Sunday afternoon broadcasts to Tuesday nights. Marchand later reported that ESPN would also renew its rights to Major League Baseball in December 2020; the renewal was confirmed on May 13, 2021. The deal removed ESPN's non-exclusive weeknight games from the schedule, but retains Sunday Night Baseball and ESPN's involvement in the Wild Card playoffs.

In March 2022, Apple Inc. announced that it had acquired the exclusive rights to a weekly doubleheader to be branded Friday Night Baseball for its Apple TV+ service. On March 9, Mike Ozanian, staff sports business writer for Forbes, reported that MLB had also reached a deal with NBC to stream the Monday and Wednesday night games on Peacock, however this would later be revised to Sunday afternoon games. The Wall Street Journal would later report that MLB and Peacock were finalizing a deal to air games on Sunday afternoons; as part of the reported agreement, the first game on the service would be simulcast on NBC, which would be its first MLB game broadcast since 2000. On April 6, NBC Sports confirmed that they had acquired a package of Sunday afternoon games to begin May 8, the initial game of which would be also simulcast on the NBC network. The deal would give Peacock an exclusive window of games on Sundays, starting before 1:30 pm Eastern time. MLB later reached a deal with YouTube, reducing its game inventory to 15 games for 2022. This would be the last year MLB games would appear on YouTube, as the website did not broadcast any MLB games in 2023. MLB Sunday Leadoff on Peacock continued into 2023, but the deal expired at the end of the season and was not renewed before the start of the 2024 season. The Roku Channel took over the MLB Sunday Leadoff package starting in May 2024.

=== 2026–2028: Fox Sports, TBS, ESPN, Apple TV+, NBC Sports and Netflix ===
On February 20, 2025, Major League Baseball and ESPN exercised a mutual opt-out on their seven-year deal that would have ended in 2028. In November of that year, MLB announced a restructured deal with ESPN, in addition to deals with NBC and Netflix. Under the deals, ESPN would retain a package of midweek games on its linear television services, including Thursday night games following the All-Star Break, would assume responsibility for the MLB.tv package, and add local streaming rights to teams under the MLB Local Media umbrella. NBC would assume Sunday Night Baseball, Sunday morning broadcasts that formerly aired on Roku, and the Wild Card games that had formerly aired on ESPN, while Netflix gained rights to the Home Run Derby and the opening night of the MLB season.

The full details of the new agreements included

- Fox Sports, TBS and Apple TV+ retaining the same rights
- 30 exclusive regular season games on ESPN, including the MLB Little League Classic, Memorial Day games and second-half opener games. Some games will also air on ABC
- 25 Sunday Night Baseball games per season on NBC Sports. When available, games will air on NBC, otherwise, games will air on NBCSN and Peacock.
- 18 MLB Sunday Leadoff games per season on NBC Sports. Games will primarily air on NBCSN and Peacock, with select games airing on NBC
- Opening Night, Home Run Derby, and one additional special event game on Netflix
- All games from the MLB Wild Card round on NBC, NBCSN and Peacock
- All MLB games played on Sunday, July 5, 2026, will air on NBC or Peacock.
- Yearly primetime Labor Day and Opening Day games on NBC and Peacock
- MLB.TV integrated into the ESPN app
- Both ESPN Unlimited and Peacock will each have a daily "game of the day" that is blacked out in home markets
- Coverage of the MLB draft and the All-Star Futures Game on NBC and Peacock
- A Sunday afternoon whiparound show on Peacock following MLB Sunday Leadoff
- Beginning in 2027, the most important game on the final day of the regular season on NBC or Peacock
- Beginning in 2027, a yearly special event game on NBC and Peacock

== Regional broadcasters ==
Major League Baseball games not broadcast exclusively by its national media partners are televised by local broadcast stations and regional sports networks. Beginning in 2023, MLB has been directly responsible for the production and distribution of several teams' regional broadcasts via its MLB Local Media division. Regionally broadcast MLB games are subject to blackouts. Premium services like MLB.tv and MLB Extra Innings make regionally broadcast games available to out-of-market fans for an extra cost. Of MLB's 30 clubs, 14 have their games primarily produced by MLB Local Media for distribution in their local markets by Internet streaming and television broadcast; including these, 22 teams have local broadcasts that are streamed by MLB to local viewers using a direct-to-consumer subscription model.

Certain national regular season telecasts on ESPN, FS1, and TBS, as well as all MLB Network regular season telecasts, are non-exclusive, and may also air in tandem with telecasts of the game by local broadcasters. However, national telecasts of these games may be blacked out in the participating teams' markets, to protect the local broadcaster.

In previous years, postseason coverage was shared between the national and local broadcasters, but starting with the 1984 postseason, all games became exclusive to MLB's national TV partners.

== See also ==
- MLB Network
- MLB Extra Innings
- MLB.tv
- List of current Major League Baseball broadcasters
- Historical Major League Baseball television broadcasters
- Major League Baseball on regional sports networks
  - Braves TBS Baseball
- The USA Thursday Game of the Week
- ESPN Major League Baseball
- Major League Baseball on ABC
- Major League Baseball on CBS
- Major League Baseball on NBC
- MLB on Fox
- MLB on TBS

== Sources ==
- Summer 1997: 75 Years of National Baseball Broadcasts
- Museum TV – SPORTS AND TELEVISION
- Baseball History 1930 to 1939
- Baseball History 1940 to 1949
- Baseball History 1950 to 1959
- Baseball History 1960 to 1969
- Baseball History 1970 to 1979
- Baseball History 1980 to 1989
- Baseball History 1990 to 1999
- Voices of The Game – MLBlog home of baseball author/historian and former presidential speechwriter Curt Smith
- Economic Values of Professional Sport Franchises in the United States
- All-Star Game – TV Analysis & Ratings
- World Series – TV Analysis & Ratings
- MLB TV/Radio History to Year 2000
- Going Inside MLB’s latest $3 billion TV agreements
- SEARCHABLE NETWORK TV BROADCASTS
