= Major League Baseball on Fox Sports Networks =

- Also known as: MLB on FSN; MLB on FX; Major League Baseball on Fox Sports Net; Major League Baseball on FSN; Major League Baseball on FX
- Genre: Baseball telecasts
- Starring: Kenny Albert; Bob Brenly; Thom Brennaman; Chip Caray; Josh Lewin; Kevin Kennedy; Steve Lyons; Steve Physioc; Jeff Torborg; Regional broadcasters
- Theme music composer: NJJ Music (1997–2010); Jochen Flach (2011–2020)
- Country of origin: United States
- Original language: English
- No. of seasons: 23

Production
- Production locations: Various MLB stadiums (game telecasts)
- Camera setup: Multi-camera
- Running time: 3 hours (or until game ends)
- Production company: Fox Sports

Original release
- Network: Fox Sports Net; FX
- Release: 1997 – 2020

Related
- Major League Baseball on SportsChannel; Major League Baseball on Bally Sports; Major League Baseball on Fox; Thursday Night Baseball

Major League Baseball on Fox Sports Networks refers to Major League Baseball television coverage on the former chain of Fox Sports regional networks.

== Background ==
Beginning in 1997, as part of the contract with Major League Baseball it had signed the year before. Fox entered a four-year joint venture with Liberty Media Cable worth $172 million. Its recently launched the cable sports network, Fox Sports Net and was given rights to two Thursday night games per week, one for the Eastern and Central time zones and one for the Mountain and Pacific time zones with no exclusivity.

For the 2000 and 2001 seasons, the Fox network's then-sister cable channel, Fox Family (later ABC Family, now Freeform) carried a weekly Major League Baseball game on Thursday nights (a game that had previously aired nationwide on Fox Sports Net from 1997 to 1999), as well as select postseason games from the Division Series.

After The Walt Disney Company's $2.9 billion acquisition of Fox Family in October 2001, the Thursday night cable television rights went to ESPN. Fox Sports Net's affiliates would however, continue to broadcast Major League Baseball games on a local basis until 2020. Come the start of the 2021 season, Fox Sports Networks were rebranded to Bally Sports following the Sinclair Broadcast Group's purchase of the Fox Corporation's regional sports channels.

From 2006 to 2006, Fox Sports Net also aired The FSN Baseball Report, which was a daily baseball analysis program aired during the Major League Baseball season.

=== League Championship Series coverage ===
For the first year of its exclusive six-year contract (2001), Fox did a split telecast (which had not been attempted since the ill-fated "Baseball Network" arrangement existed) for the League Championship Series. This meant that two games were played simultaneously on the same night, with one game airing on the Fox network and the other on the regional Fox Sports Net cable channel (depending on market, as some markets did not have a regional sports network with a relationship to FSN). The rationale behind the split-telecast was that because of the September 11 attacks, the entire post-season schedule was delayed by a week. Because of this, two Sunday LCS games came in conflict with a Fox NFL doubleheader. Fans and sports journalists were unimpressed with the situation and MLB commissioner Bud Selig vowed that it was a one-time deal necessitated by circumstance. However, in later years, Fox used split telecasts on a few occasions to keep the playoffs "on schedule" and maximize its prime time advertising revenue, and aired the second game on FX, which has virtually nationwide distribution on cable and satellite. This ensured that Fox did not have to air an LCS game on a weekday afternoon, when many viewers are unable to watch.

In 2001, Game 5 of the NLCS and Game 4 of the ALCS were split between Fox and Fox Sports Net. This came off the heels of Fox airing an NFL doubleheader that particular day (October 21). In 2002, Game 1 of the NLCS and Game 2 of the ALCS were split between Fox and Fox Sports Net. The regional split was done in order for Fox to avoid televising a weekday afternoon game. In 2004, Game 1 of the NLCS and Game 2 of the ALCS were split between Fox and Fox Sports Net.

=== Theme music ===
NJJ Music composed the original MLB on Fox theme music in 1996. This theme music was used exclusively from June 1996 until early May 2007. In mid-May 2007, an updated version was unveiled, featuring a more jazzy feel and implementing a full orchestra instead of the synth elements used by the 1996 theme. For the 2007 postseason, a Jochen Flach-composed slow orchestral theme was unveiled, and was used alongside the updated regular theme for the All-Star Game and postseason from the 2007 ALCS until the 2010 All-Star Game. Fox Saturday Baseball, including the prime time games starting in 2010, still used the 2007 version of the regular theme song exclusively.

During the 2009 season, some Fox Sports regional affiliates switched to the 2007 theme while others continued using the original 1996 theme. However, all regional affiliates began using the 2007 theme starting with the 2011 season.

Beginning with the 2010 postseason, both the 2007 theme and the Flach theme were replaced by the longtime NFL on Fox theme music, which began to be used for all Fox sporting events. However, starting in 2011 and continuing to today, various songs from the album Heroes: The Olympic Collection were used when going into commercial breaks during the All-Star Game, postseason, and other marquee games such as Red Sox-Yankees games.

In 2014, the 2007–2010 jazz theme was brought back for regular season MLB on FS1. The NFL theme was retained for MLB on Fox, including Fox Saturday Baseball, Baseball Night in America, the All-Star Game and all coverage of the postseason. However, occasionally one of the two themes was heard on telecasts that were designated for the other, implying that the designations are slightly fluid.

In 2020, MLB on Fox reverted to the original 1996-2007 theme; Fox Sports regional affiliates continued to use the 2007-2010 theme until the network was rebranded to Bally Sports in 2021. As of the 2021 season, the original theme is now used for coverage of all games across both Fox and FS1.

== Commentators ==
Play-by-play announcers for the FSN/Fox Family coverage included Kenny Albert, Thom Brennaman, Chip Caray, Josh Lewin, and Steve Physioc. Color analysts included Bob Brenly, Kevin Kennedy, Steve Lyons, and Jeff Torborg. Occasionally, FSN would simulcast a local-team feed of a game from one of its affiliated regional sports networks in lieu of a dedicated national production.

== Former Fox Sports Networks owned-and-operated affiliates ==
After 21st Century Fox became acquired by the Walt Disney Company, the Fox Sports Networks were divested and were sold to Diamond Sports Group, a joint-venture between Sinclair Broadcasting Group and Entertainment Studios. All of the Fox Sports Networks are now rebranded as Bally Sports as of March 31, 2021.

| Network | Region served | MLB team rights | Notes |
|---|---|---|---|
| Fox Sports Arizona (Note: Formerly known as Prime Sports Arizona until 1996.) | Arizona; New Mexico; Utah southern Nevada | Arizona Diamondbacks | The network was later renamed as Bally Sports Arizona on March 31, 2021. |
| Fox Sports Detroit | Michigan (statewide) northwestern Ohio northeastern Indiana northeast Wisconsin | Detroit Tigers | FSN Detroit produces a pre-game/post-game show titled Tigers Live. Fox Sports Net Detroit acquired the local television rights to Tigers games (as well as those from the Detroit Pistons and Detroit Red Wings) from PASS Sports, which subsequently ceased operations in 1997. The network was later named Bally Sports Detroit on March 31, 2021. |
| Fox Sports Florida (Note: Formerly known as SportsChannel Florida until 2000, and was the last FSN-acquired network acquired through the SportsChannel purchase to retire the name.) | Florida (statewide) southern Alabama southern Georgia | Tampa Bay Rays; Miami Marlins; Atlanta Braves | Shares broadcast rights to the Rays and Marlins with co-owned Fox Sports Sun. The network was later renamed as Bally Sports Florida on March 31, 2021. |
| Fox Sports Kansas City (Note: Formerly part of FSN Midwest prior to 2008; formerly known as Prime Sports Network until 1997. Fox Sports Kansas City was created as a spin-off of FSN Midwest, after it acquired the Royals rights from the defunct Royals Sports Television Network. Fox Sports Midwest produces some of the channel's programming.) | Kansas City metropolitan area | Kansas City Royals | Telecasts of St. Louis Cardinals games are available in the Kansas City market via Fox Sports Midwest on some local pay television providers, with Cardinals games airing on Fox Sports Kansas City when the channel is not scheduled to air a Royals game telecast concurring/overlapping with Fox Sports Midwest. The networks were later renamed as Bally Sports Kansas City and Bally Sports Midwest on March 31, 2021. |
| Fox Sports Midwest (Note: Formerly known as Prime Sports Midwest until 1996.) | Missouri southern Illinois southern Indiana eastern Nebraska eastern Kansas western Kentucky northern Arkansas | St. Louis Cardinals | Fox Sports Midwest's telecasts of Cardinals games are also broadcast in West Tennessee and northern Mississippi. The networks were later renamed as Bally Sports Kansas City and Bally Sports Midwest on March 31, 2021. |
| Fox Sports North (Note: Originated as WCCO II in 1986, later known as Midwest Sports Channel from 1989 to 1996. Regional subfeeds exist for the Minnesota/Dakotas region, and portions of Wisconsin not part of the Minneapolis–St. Paul market. The Wisconsin feed became the separate Fox Sports Wisconsin in April 2007.) | Minnesota; Wisconsin; Iowa; North Dakota; South Dakota | Minnesota Twins | Fox Sports North does a show titled "Twins Live." It serves at a pregame and postgame show and airs from Target Field whenever the Twins are at home and at a studio for road games. The networks were later renamed as Bally Sports North and Bally Sports Wisconsin on March 31, 2021. |
| Fox Sports Ohio (Note: Formerly known as SportsChannel Ohio until 1998. Separate subfeeds also exist for the Cincinnati and Cleveland markets.) | Ohio eastern Indiana; Kentucky northwestern Pennsylvania, southwestern New York | Cincinnati Reds | Fox Sports Ohio's telecasts of Reds games are also broadcast in Nashville, Tennessee and its surrounding areas, and western North Carolina. |
| Fox Sports San Diego (Note: Created in 2012, as a result of acquiring the Padres television rights from 4SD. The Padres hold a 20% ownership stake in Fox Sports San Diego.) | San Diego | San Diego Padres | The network was later renamed as Bally Sports West and Bally Sports SoCal on March 31, 2021. |
| Fox Sports South (Note: Formerly known as SportSouth (which was subsequently adopted by the former Turner South following Fox's 2006 purchase of that channel) until 1996.) | Georgia; Mississippi; Alabama; Kentucky; South Carolina; North Carolina; Tennessee; Florida | Atlanta Braves; Tampa Bay Rays; Miami Marlins | The network was later renamed as Bally Sports South and Bally Sports Southeast on March 31, 2021. |
| Fox Sports Southeast (Note: Formerly known as Turner South from 1996 to October 13, 2006, when it adopted the old SportSouth name of sister station Fox Sports South following its sale by Time Warner's Turner Broadcasting System subsidiary to then Fox Sports Networks parent News Corporation (now 21st Century Fox). Renamed Fox Sports Southeast on October 5, 2015 to avoid confusion with Fox Sports South.) | Georgia; Alabama; Mississippi; Tennessee; Kentucky; Florida; South Carolina; North Carolina | Atlanta Braves; Tampa Bay Rays; Miami Marlins | The network was later renamed as Bally Sports South and Bally Sports Southeast on March 31, 2021. |
| Fox Sports Southwest (Note: Formerly known as Home Sports Entertainment from 1984 to 1994, and as Prime Sports Southwest until 1996.) | Texas northern Louisiana; New Mexico; Arkansas | Texas Rangers | Rangers telecasts are sometimes broadcast on Fox Sports Oklahoma, a sub-feed of Fox Sports Southwest, whenever an Oklahoma City Thunder, Oklahoma Sooners or Oklahoma State Cowboys game telecast is not scheduled. The network was later renamed as Bally Sports Southwest on March 31, 2021. |
| Fox Sports Sun (Note: Formerly known as Sunshine Network (originally serving as a Prime Network affiliate) until 2005, renamed Sun Sports until 2015; was acquired by Fox Sports Networks in 1996.) | Florida | Miami Marlins; Tampa Bay Rays; Atlanta Braves | Shares broadcast rights to the Rays and Marlins with co-owned Fox Sports Florida. The network was later renamed as Bally Sports Florida on March 31, 2021. |
| Fox Sports West/Fox Sports Prime Ticket (Note: Fox Sports West was formerly known as (the original) Prime Ticket from 1987 to 1993 and Prime Sports West until 1996; Fox Sports Prime Ticket was formerly known as FSN West 2 until 2007.) | Southern and Central California, southern Nevada, and Hawaii | Los Angeles Angels of Anaheim | Fox Sports West previously held the regional television rights to the Los Angeles Dodgers until 2013; SportsNet LA assumed the rights the following season as part of a 25-year broadcast agreement with that network's parent Time Warner Cable. The network was later renamed as Bally Sports West and Bally Sports SoCal on March 31, 2021. |
| Fox Sports Wisconsin (Note: Formerly known as Wisconsin Sports Network from 1996 to 1998, when it became a subfeed of Midwest Sports Channel. Formerly part of Fox Sports North (the former MSC) until 2007; it became a separate channel after Fox Sports Networks acquired the rights to the Milwaukee Brewers. Fox Sports Wisconsin remains a subfeed of Fox Sports North in some markets.) | Wisconsin western Upper Peninsula of Michigan eastern Minnesota northwestern Illinois; Iowa | Milwaukee Brewers | The networks were later renamed as Bally Sports North and Bally Sports Wisconsin on March 31, 2021. |
| SportsTime Ohio (Note: Originally established by the Indians in 2006, purchased by Fox in December 2012.) | Ohio | Cleveland Indians | The network was later renamed as Bally Sports Great Lakes on March 31, 2021. |
| YES Network (Note: Originally established by the Yankees in 2002, Fox purchased 49% stake in December 2012; acquired 80% control in January 2014. Fox no longer owns the YES Network and now operates as an affiliate to Bally Sports.) | New York northern New Jersey northeast Pennsylvania southern Connecticut | New York Yankees | |

=== Former regional rights holders ===
| Network | Region served | MLB team rights | Notes |
|---|---|---|---|
| NBC Sports Bay Area (Note: Formerly known as Pacific Sports Network (PSN) until 1990, SportsChannel Bay Area until 1993 and SportsChannel Pacific until 1998.) | Northern and central California, northwestern Nevada and parts of southern Oregon | San Francisco Giants; Oakland Athletics | Cablevision sold its 60% interest in FSN Bay Area in April 2007 to Comcast, which relaunched the network as NBC Sports Bay Area on March 31, 2008 (the channel continued to carry select FSN programming until August 2012); |
| FSN Chicago (Note: Originally known as Sportsvision Chicago from 1979 to 1984, Hawkvision/ONTV until 1987 and SportsChannel Chicago until 1998.) | Northern Illinois, northern Indiana, and eastern Iowa | Chicago Cubs; Chicago White Sox | FSN Chicago lost the regional cable rights to the Cubs and White Sox to NBC Sports Chicago; FSN Chicago ceased operations on June 23, 2006. |
| Fox Sports Houston (Note: Formerly served by FSN Southwest, before becoming an alternate feed of the channel; Fox Sports Houston became a separate subfeed on January 12, 2009. Christine Hall (January 7, 2009). "Fox Sports Houston set for new identity". Houston Business Journal.) | Southern Texas southern Louisiana | Houston Astros | Fox Sports Houston held rights to the Houston Astros until 2012, when the newly launched Root Sports Southwest acquired the rights to the Astros and Houston Rockets; Fox Sports Houston subsequently ceased operations as a result. |
