= MLB Sunday Leadoff =

Live streaming of Sunday Major League Baseball (MLB) games

- Also known as: Sunday Afternoon Baseball
- Genre: American baseball game telecasts
- Presented by: Various commentators
- Country of origin: United States
- Original language: English
- No. of seasons: 5 (through 2026 season)

Production
- Production locations: Various MLB stadiums (game telecasts)
- Camera setup: Multi-camera
- Running time: 210 minutes or until game ends (inc. adverts)
- Production companies: Major League Baseball; MLB Local Media (2024–2025); NBC Sports (2022–2023 and 2026–present)

Original release
- Network: NBC; Peacock
- Release: May 8, 2022 – September 3, 2023
- Network: The Roku Channel
- Release: May 19, 2024 – September 7, 2025
- Network: NBC (simulcasts, alternate broadcasts, and overflow); NBCSN; Peacock; Telemundo, TeleXitos and Universo (Spanish audio/broadcast)
- Release: March 29, 2026 – present

Related
- Major League Baseball on NBC; Sunday Night Baseball

MLB Sunday Leadoff is the branding used for broadcasts of Major League Baseball (MLB) games that primarily are held on Sunday afternoon. In 2026, NBC Sports produces these broadcasts for air on Peacock, NBCSN, and NBC. NBC Sports previously produced games for Peacock from 2022 to 2023, with one game each season simulcast on NBC. In 2024 and 2025, MLB Sunday Leadoff was produced by MLB Local Media for The Roku Channel and was also available nationwide on MLB.tv.

== History ==
MLB Sunday Leadoff on Peacock logo (2022–2023)

MLB Sunday Leadoff on Roku logo (2024–2025)

In March 2022, it was reported by The Wall Street Journal that NBC Sports was finalizing an agreement to establish a new package of Sunday afternoon games beginning in the 2022 MLB season. The package would be a successor to TBS's previous Sunday afternoon package during the later half of the season; as part of a contract renewal, TBS replaced these games with a new Tuesday night package across the entire regular season.

As a prelude to the deal, Peacock had exclusively aired a June 2021 series between the Philadelphia Phillies and San Francisco Giants. It was co-produced by NBC Sports Bay Area and NBC Sports Philadelphia, and featured a broadcast team led by the Giants' lead play-by-play announcer Jon Miller and his partner Mike Krukow, joined by the Phillies' analysts John Kruk and Jimmy Rollins.

NBC formally announced the deal on April 6, with a reported value of $30 million per-season. As part of the agreement, Peacock would also carry the All-Star Futures Game, as well as an MLB content hub featuring classic games and other video content.

On April 13, 2022, NBC Sports announced that the games would be branded as MLB Sunday Leadoff.

The inaugural broadcast was a game featuring the Chicago White Sox at the Boston Red Sox on May 8. The game was also simulcast on the NBC broadcast network, marking its first MLB broadcast since Game 6 of the 2000 American League Championship Series on October 17, 2000, and its first regular season MLB broadcast since September 29, 1995. All other games were exclusive to Peacock Premium subscribers.

Outside of the United States, the games were carried on MLB's out-of-market packages (including MLB.tv). In Canada, the Toronto Blue Jays' appearances were televised as normal by MLB's Canadian broadcast partner Sportsnet, as part of its regional rights to the team.

For the 2023 season, the number of games increased to 19. Six games started at 11:30 a.m., ten started at 12:00 p.m., and three started at 1:00 p.m. ET. For the second consecutive year, one game was simulcast on NBC.

On May 13, 2024, Major League Baseball announced the package would move to The Roku Channel for the 2024 season. The games are also simulcast on MLB.tv. Roku pays around $10 million a year for the rights package.

On November 19, 2025, the package returned to NBC Sports on a three-year deal. Games will still be streamed on Peacock, but will also air on NBCSN, with one game slated on NBC.

== Production ==
The broadcasts were described as being "hyperlocal" with a "national flair", being built upon the on-air presentation for NBC Sports' regional MLB coverage. Former Los Angeles Dodgers broadcaster Vin Scully (who served as NBC's lead play-by-play commentator for its MLB coverage from 1983 to 1989) narrated a special introduction for the first broadcast, emphasizing NBC's history as an MLB broadcaster (including its historic Game of the Week broadcasts).

Upon moving to The Roku Channel in 2024, MLB Local Media assumed production of the broadcasts.

== Personnel ==
Jason Benetti (who at the time called Chicago White Sox games for NBC Sports Chicago, and also worked NBC's telecasts of baseball during the 2020 Summer Olympics) served as the lead by-play announcer for the 2022 season, joined by rotating analysts from each participating team. Jon Miller filled in for the San Francisco Giants vs. Cincinnati Reds game. Ahmed Fareed would serve as the studio host.

Benetti joined Fox Sports in August 2022. Brendan Burke replaced Benetti as the lead play-by-play announcer for MLB Sunday Leadoff in 2023. Due to Burke's Stanley Cup Playoff commitments for TNT, Matt Vasgersian of MLB Network and Chris Vosters of NBC Sports Chicago filled in for Burke during the first four games of Peacock's 2023 schedule. Dave Sims filled in for Brendan Burke on Sunday, August 20.

For the move to The Roku Channel in 2024, MLB Sunday Leadoff utilized a mix of local TV announcers from both teams, typically with the home or away team's play-by-play announcer and sideline reporter joined by the home or road team's color analyst.

With the return to NBC Sports and Peacock, Sunday Leadoff returned to having a consistent play-by-play announcer, with Matt Vasgersian serving as the lead announcer for most games, and Dave Flemming filling in for select games when Vasgersian is not available.

== Schedule ==
Since the beginning of MLB Sunday Leadoff, teams have been prohibited from starting Sunday games prior to 1:30 p.m. ET in order to give MLB Sunday Leadoff an exclusive window. As of the 2026 season, Sunday Leadoff games primarily start at 12 p.m., but, despite the name, MLB Sunday Leadoff games can be scheduled to start as late as 4 p.m. ET.

== See also ==
- Friday Night Baseball
- MLB Game of the Week Live on YouTube
