= MLB Tuesday =

Branding for televised live game telecasts

- Also known as: MLB on TBS/TNT/TruTV; MLB en TBS/TNT/TruTV (Latin America only)
- Genre: American baseball game telecasts
- Presented by: Brian Anderson; Alex Faust; Don Orsillo; Brandon Gaudin; Ron Darling; Jeff Francoeur; Lauren Jbara; Lauren Shehadi; Pedro Martinez; Curtis Granderson; Jimmy Rollins
- Country of origin: United States
- Original language: English
- No. of seasons: 5 (through 2026 season)

Production
- Production locations: Various MLB stadiums (game telecasts); Techwood Studios, Atlanta, Georgia (pre-game, halftime and post-game shows)
- Camera setup: Multi-camera
- Running time: 210 minutes or until game ends (inc. adverts)
- Production companies: Major League Baseball; TNT Sports; TUDN

Original release
- Network: TBS; TNT; TruTV; HBO Max; UniMás; TUDN
- Release: April 12, 2022 – present

Related
- Major League Baseball on CBS

MLB Tuesday is an American television presentation of Major League Baseball (MLB) games produced by TNT Sports primarily for TBS. The broadcasts debuted on April 12, 2022, and features a 30-minute studio show before and after each game.

Prior to 2022, ESPN, FX and FS1 occasionally aired games on Tuesday nights.

== History ==
=== ESPN (1990–1993) ===
On January 5, 1989, Major League Baseball signed a $400 million deal with ESPN, who would show over 175 games beginning in 1990. For the next four years, ESPN would televise six games a week (Sunday Night Baseball, Wednesday Night Baseball and doubleheaders on Tuesdays and Fridays), as well as multiple games on Opening Day, Memorial Day, Independence Day and Labor Day.

Since the end of that contract ESPN has not aired a full slate of Tuesday night games but has consistently aired several games per year since 1997. With Turner Sports gaining the exclusive rights to MLB games on Tuesday nights, Tuesday night ESPN games were discontinued.

=== Fox Sports ===
==== FX (1997–1998) ====
In 1997, FX obtained the partial pay-television rights to MLB games; while most game telecasts aired on Monday nights or Saturday nights, 11 games in 1997 and 1 game in 1998 aired on Tuesdays.

==== FS1 (2014–2021) ====
FS1 occasionally aired baseball on Tuesday nights between 2014 and 2021 as part of their irregularly scheduled non-exclusive broadcast package. With the TBS television package having moved to Tuesday nights in 2021, FS1's schedule no longer includes Tuesday night games.

=== MLB Tuesday on TBS (2022–present) ===
Prior to 2022, during the regular season, TBS broadcast a weekly game nationally on Sunday afternoons, under the title Sunday MLB on TBS. These games were not exclusive to TBS and were blacked out in local markets, to protect the stations that hold the local broadcast rights to the games. In the affected areas, simulcasts of programming from sister network HLN aired in place of the games.

On September 24, 2020, it was announced that Turner Sports had renewed its baseball rights through 2028 (aligned with the conclusion of Fox's most recent extension). However instead of a package of Sunday afternoon games the contract includes primetime games on Tuesday nights throughout the regular season (The Sunday afternoon games was instead sold as a separate package now known as MLB Sunday Leadoff).

The program includes a 30-minute studio show before and after each game.

During the final month of the 2024 Major League Baseball season, TBS' sister network TruTV aired MLB Race to the Pennant on Tuesday nights. The show featured a whip-around format hosted by Alanna Rizzo and Yonder Alonso. TNT Sports also added additional games in order to air MLB Tuesday doubleheaders the final three weeks of the season. One of the doubleheaders featured one game instead on TruTV, marking the first time the network has exclusively aired a regular season MLB game in full.

TruTV began simulcasting select MLB Tuesday games with TBS beginning with the 2025 season.
