= Major League Baseball on NBC Sports Regional Networks =

Major League Baseball on NBC Sports Regional Networks refers to Major League Baseball television coverage on the chain of NBC Sports regional networks.

== NBC Sports Bay Area (San Francisco Giants) ==
Giants' telecasts are split between KNTV (over-the-air) and NBC Sports Bay Area (cable). Jon Miller regularly calls the action on KNTV (on September 4, 2010, Miller made his first appearance with then Comcast SportsNet Bay Area), while the announcing team for NBC Sports Bay Area telecasts is Mike Krukow and Duane Kuiper, affectionately known as "Kruk and Kuip" (pronounced "Kruke" and "Kype"). KNTV's broadcast contract with the Giants began in 2008, one year after the team and KTVU mostly ended a relationship that dated to 1958, the team's first year in the Bay Area. (As a FOX affiliate, KTVU continues to air Giants games that are part of the Major League Baseball on Fox package; Several Giants games a year are also part of the ESPN and TBS packages.).

=== See also ===
- List of San Francisco Giants broadcasters

== NBC Sports Chicago (Chicago White Sox) ==
NBC Sports Chicago was created in 2004. It is jointly owned by Comcast subsidiary NBCUniversal (20%), the family of J. Joseph Ricketts (owner of the Cubs, 20%), Jerry Reinsdorf (owner of both the Bulls and the White Sox, giving him a 40% stake), and Rocky Wirtz (owner of the Chicago Blackhawks, 20%). The channel airs a majority of games for those four teams. It also carries games for the AFL Chicago Rush, Chicago Fire S.C., and NIU Huskies football. Although WCIU-TV and WGN-TV carry many Cubs, White Sox, Blackhawks and Bulls games, NBC Sports Chicago was created so the teams mentioned could have editorial control over their broadcasts. Previously, these teams' cable games were produced by FSN Chicago. However, with the creation of the then Comcast SportsNet Chicago, all of Chicago's major professional teams dropped their agreements with FSN Chicago, though that channel limped along for another two years until going defunct in 2006. All games of the major Chicago sports teams on NBC SportsNet Chicago are broadcast in high definition.

=== Cubs (until 2019) ===
Cubs telecasts are locally aired on three different outlets: Over broadcast television via the WGN television outlets (both the local station on Channel 9 and the superstation nationally, produced through the station's WGN Sports department), Weigel Broadcasting's WCIU-TV (Channel 26.1) and on cable television over NBC Sports Chicago (of which the Ricketts family owns a 20% interest), with some games, mainly on Wednesday evenings, airing over the supplemental NBC Sports+ channel. WCIU came into the fold in the early 2000s due to demands by The WB Television Network for WGN to devote more time to the network's programming, and later on the same has been expected by The CW, though WGN still does push back CW primetime programming to accommodate game broadcasts.

Len Kasper is the play-by-play announcer, and Bob Brenly, a former major league catcher and Arizona Diamondbacks manager, is the color commentator for the games. WGN also produces the games shown on WCIU; for those games, the score bug changes the "WGN" logo to "WGN Sports on The U" (previously "CubsNet"). WCIU games additionally air over MyNetworkTV affiliate WMYS-LD (Channel 69) in the South Bend, Indiana market. WGN and CSN Chicago generally show an even number of Cubs games, while WCIU averages about 8 games per season.

In 2009, the Chicago Cubs expressed interest in creating their own regional cable network. Crane Kenney, the Cubs' president, said that a regional network owned by the Cubs would create additional revenue streams. The hope was that this would be similar to other successful regional sports networks such as the YES Network and NESN. The only difference would be that the Cubs could not immediately broadcast Cubs games due to the existing contracts and/or ownership stakes in the then CSN Chicago, WGN-TV and WCIU-TV. According to Kenney, the new Cubs network would be like the MLB Network, but showing Cubs-only programming. Classic Cubs games from the past could be scheduled as well as in-depth specials. Live telecasts of the minor league affiliate Iowa Cubs games were also being considered (when there are no Cubs games scheduled or available due to contract agreements).

The 2019 Major League Baseball season was the teams final on NBC Sports Chicago. Since the 2020 season the Cubs have partnered with their own regional sports network for games, Marquee Sports Network.

==== See also ====
- List of Chicago Cubs broadcasters

=== White Sox ===
Television broadcasts were formally split three ways: WGN (both the local feed and WGN America), WCIU-TV (a local independent station) and NBC Sports Chicago. The announcers are the same wherever the game is televised: Ken "The Hawk" Harrelson on play-by-play and Steve Stone on color. Occasionally, well-known former White Sox players such as "Black Jack" McDowell fill in as substitutes in the broadcast booth. However, since the 2019 season NBC Sports Chicago is the exclusive home for non nationally televised White Sox games. Since the 2019 season Jason Benetti has been the play-by-play announcer.

==== See also ====
- List of Chicago White Sox broadcasters

== American League West ==
=== NBC Sports California (Oakland Athletics) ===
As of 2012, television coverage is exclusively on NBC Sports California. Some A's games air on an alternate feed of NBC Sports, called NBC Sports Plus, if the main channel shows a Sacramento Kings game at the same time. Although the network was originally aimed at the Northern California region, the network began to expand as a complement to their Bay Area station, beginning with a re-branding to Comcast SportsNet California in September 2008, and becoming the official broadcaster of the Oakland Athletics (who were originally served by CSN Bay Area in addition to the San Francisco Giants) for the 2009 MLB season, broadcasting an increased regular season of 145 regular season games (an increase of 37 from in 2008)

On TV, Glen Kuiper covers play-by-play, and Ray Fosse provides color commentary. Fosse also does color commentary on the radio when the A's are not on TV, or the game is on Fox or ESPN. Fosse also does play by play on the radio during Spring training games.

==== See also ====
- List of Oakland Athletics broadcasters

== National League East ==
=== NBC Sports Philadelphia (Philadelphia Phillies) ===
As of 2014, the Phillies' television stations are NBC Sports Philadelphia and WCAU-TV (channel 10) with some early season games shown on NBC Sports Philadelphia+ (formerly known as TCN) when there are conflicts on NBC Sports Philadelphia with 76ers and Flyers games. NBC Sports Philadelphia produces the games shown on the above-mentioned stations. Scott Franzke and Jim Jackson provide play-by-play on the radio, with Larry Andersen as the color commentator. Tom McCarthy calls play-by-play for the television broadcasts, with Ben Davis, John Kruk, and Mike Schmidt providing color commentary.

Phillies games used to be unavailable on the satellite version of MLB Extra Innings. Beginning in 2007, both the cable and satellite version of MLB Extra Innings began to use the then CSN Philadelphia feed for some games and in 2008, when MLB Extra Innings began showing both feeds of most games, all Phillies games shown on the then CSN Philadelphia became available to all subscribers. In 2010, Phillies games on WPHL (which are produced by NBC Sports Philadelphia) were also shown on Extra Innings. Residents in the Philadelphia area cannot view these games due to blackout restrictions.

==== See also ====
- List of Philadelphia Phillies broadcasters
- Phillies Pre Game Live
- Phillies Post Game Live

=== SportsNet New York (New York Mets) ===
SNY was created in an effort for the New York Mets to better leverage their broadcasting rights, which were previously held by Cablevision on their MSG Network and FSN New York networks. From 1998 to 2002, Cablevision had a monopoly on all local professional sports franchises in the New York City market, participating in many unfair business practices like moving games to their MSG Metro Channels with limited distribution. In 2002, the New York Yankees and New Jersey Nets broke the monopoly by starting the YES Network for their games, leaving the Mets in the Cablevision fold until their contract expired in 2005.

As of the 2011 season the Mets received $68 million in rights from the SportsNet New York channel, which they own two-thirds of.

SNY carries at least 120 Mets games per season (with the remainder airing on WPIX, FOX, TBS, or ESPN). Gregg Picker produces the games and Bill Webb, who directs the World Series and the All-Star Game for FOX, is the director for Mets broadcasts on both SNY and WPIX.

Notes:

- Mets games on SNY and post-games delay other programming, such as the 10:00 SportsNite, and preempt all or parts of shows at midnight when a 7:00 game runs long.
- There is no 10:00 SportsNite when the Mets play a game on SNY starting at 8:00 or later.
- Mets games on WPIX (and simulcast on other stations) are produced by SNY.
- All times given in Eastern Time Zone, as SportsNet New York is based in New York City.
- As of the start of the 2007 Mets season, SNY debuted a new set of graphics for both their Mets telecasts and SportsNite telecasts. These graphics include a new scoreboard which goes along the entire top portion of the screen as well as a new sports ticker on the bottom portion of the screen. The ticker now provides more stats including wins, losses, and saves, much like the ESPN BottomLine ticker. SNY features a "SNY HD" logo in the scoreboard for games that are available in high-definition on both the HD and SD feeds. Games shown on WPIX replace the SNY logo with the PIX11 logo. The scoreboard was updated in the 2009 Mets season.
- None of the programming on SNY was closed-captioned for the hearing impaired until May 1, 2009. On that date the game between the Mets and Phillies was closed-captioned. The FCC gives new stations four years before they are required to begin captioning. As of February, 2010, SNY became fully closed-captioned.

==== See also ====
- List of New York Mets broadcasters
- Mets Pre-Game Live: half-hour-long program which previews the upcoming Mets games/series.
- Mets Post-Game Live: half-hour-long program which recaps and reviews recent Mets Games and take a look at ahead of upcoming series.
- Mets Fast Forward: hour-long condensed version of the previous Mets game at 6:00 a.m. & 9:00 a.m. following a Mets game on SNY or PIX11.
- Mets Weekly: weekly half-hour Mets coverage, interviews, and stories; premieres Sundays at 6:00 p.m.
- Kids Clubhouse: weekly half-hour kids' baseball education and coverage; premieres Saturdays at 12:00 p.m. Hosted by Neha Joy.
- Mets Classics: classic Mets games from past seasons and the current season (UltiMet Classics).
- Mets Hot Stove: offseason hot stove discussion about the Mets hosted by Kevin Burkhardt with various local writers.
- Mets Yearbook: half-hour program of past Mets year in reviews from 1962 to 1988.
- Mets Year in Review: a program recapping the mets season since 2009 hosted by Kevin Burkhardt.

== Former ==
=== Comcast SportsNet Houston (Houston Astros) ===
It was the exclusive home of the NBA's Houston Rockets beginning with the 2012–13 NBA season and the MLB's Houston Astros beginning in the 2013 MLB season and will be majority owned by the teams (Astros at 46.384% and Rockets at 30.923%, with NBCUniversal owning the other 22.693%).

The initial idea of a team-owned regional sports network was first proposed in 1999. It was former Rockets president George Postolos, who floated the idea with Fox, who passed on the offer. The Rockets then teamed up with the Astros in 2003 to jointly launch an RSN. The first order of business was to sever ties with Fox Sports Houston, which led to a 20-month court battle. The settlement with Fox led to a new deal with the network valued at $600 million over 10–15 years. However, this contract contained a clause allowing the teams to bail on the contract and negotiate with other networks starting in late 2009. The Astros/Rockets group held talks with Comcast, DirecTV, and AT&T; but no carriage contracts for any of those providers have been officially announced. Continuation of the Astros and Rockets broadcasts on Fox Sports Houston was on the table as the network offered $1.2 billion over 10 years. However, it was ownership in a regional sports network that the two teams wanted. This led to the teams agreeing to a $1 billion contract with Comcast, which included a 77.307% ownership in the network. The channel later went into bankruptcy and was purchased by AT&T who turned it into AT&T SportsNet Southwest.

==== See also ====
- List of Houston Astros broadcasters
