= MLB Game of the Week Live on YouTube =

Baseball games on YouTube

- MLB Game of the Week Live on YouTube logo
- Also known as: MLB on YouTube
- Genre: Baseball telecasts
- Presented by: Scott Braun; Yonder Alonso
- Country of origin: United States
- Original language: English
- No. of seasons: 3

Production
- Production locations: Various MLB stadiums (game telecasts); One MLB Network Plaza Secaucus, New Jersey (studio segments, pregame and postgame shows)
- Camera setup: Multi-camera
- Running time: 180 minutes (varies depending on game length)
- Production companies: MLB Network; YouTube

Original release
- Network: YouTube
- Release: July 18, 2019 – September 8, 2022

MLB Game of the Week Live on YouTube was the presentation of Major League Baseball (MLB) games live on the video sharing and social media platform YouTube. Games were produced by the league-owned MLB Network. Games generally streamed in the afternoon on weekdays.

== History ==
On April 30, 2019, Major League Baseball and YouTube agreed to a partnership for 13 exclusive baseball games. The agreement was essentially a replacement to an earlier deal with Facebook Watch, which was criticized for requiring a Facebook account to access and for having too clunky of an interface. The YouTube games would feature a pre and post game show, alongside the game, all produced by MLB Network. There was no requirement for a YouTube account to access the game. The first game streamed was between the Phillies and the Dodgers on July 18, 2019. After the season, MLB said they averaged 130,000 viewers per telecast. The August 7, Dodgers-Cardinals telecast saw the highest peak of 320,000 live viewers.

Because of the COVID-19 pandemic, and the resulting reduction of the 2020 MLB season to 60 games, MLB on YouTube only showed 4 games, all in September, during the 2020 season. Two of these games were exclusive to the platform, while two others were shown in tandem with local regional sports networks.

For the 2021 MLB season, MLB on YouTube returned with 21 exclusive games. During the season YouTube produced two special broadcasts. On June 30, YouTube featured a special stat focused statcast broadcast between the Mariners and Blue Jays. YouTube's game between the Orioles and Rays on July 20 featured the first all-female announcing crew on an MLB broadcast. Melanie Newman (play-by-play), Sarah Langs (color commentator), Heidi Watney and Lauren Gardner (pre- and postgame show co-hosts) were back at MLB Network studios while Alanna Rizzo was the reporter at Tropicana Field.

On April 14, 2022, Major League Baseball announced that YouTube would have 15 exclusive games for the 2022 MLB season. Unlike previous years which featured a rotating broadcasting crew, Scott Braun handled all play–by–play duties and Yonder Alonso handled all color commentating. For the August 17, 2022 broadcast between the Los Angeles Angels and Seattle Mariners, an alternate broadcast hosted by Lauren Gardner and Cameron Maybin was also produced. The broadcast featured celebrity guests such as Bill Nye, Joel McHale and Kenny Mayne, among others.

The series did not return in 2023. Though not directly related, YouTube TV dropped MLB Network due to a carriage dispute prior to the season.

== Commentators ==
=== Play-by-play ===
- Scott Braun (2019–2022)
- Brian Kenny (2021)
- Stephen Nelson (2019–2021)
- Melanie Newman (2021)
- Matt Vasgersian (2021)
- Rich Waltz (2019)

=== Color commentators ===
- Jeremy Affeldt (2019, 2021)
- Yonder Alonso (2021–2022)
- Geoff Blum (2021)
- Eric Byrnes (2019)
- Sean Casey (2019–2021)
- Ben Davis (2019)
- Rajai Davis (2021)
- Mark DeRosa (2021)
- Matt Diaz (2019)
- Tim Dillard (2021)
- Shawn Estes (2019, 2021)
- Cliff Floyd (2019)
- John Franco (2021)
- Nomar Garciaparra (2019)
- Danny Graves (2021)
- Mark Gubicza (2021)
- Jeremy Guthrie (2021)
- Jerry Hairston (2021)
- Orel Hershiser (2019)
- LaTroy Hawkins (2021)
- Mark Langston (2019)
- Al Leiter (2019)
- Kyle Lohse (2019)
- Justin Maxwell (2019)
- Jason Marquis (2019)
- Buck Martinez (2019)
- Kevin Millar (2020)
- Sarah Langs (2021)
- Mark Langston (2019)
- Justin Morneau (2019)
- Carlos Peña (2019, 2022)
- Dan Plesac (2019–2021)
- Ryan Rowland-Smith (2021)
- F. P. Santangelo (2019)
- Buck Showalter (2021)
- John Smoltz (2020)
- Jim Thome (2019)
- B.J. Upton (2019)
- Tom Verducci (2019, 2021)
- Chris Young (2021)

== Broadcasts ==
The pre- and postgame shows were each 30 minutes in duration. The former was broadcast from MLB Network studios while the latter was handled by the broadcasters who also present the Player of the Game trophy which is based on viewer voting.

=== 2021 ===
Date	Away team	Home team	Time (ET)	Score	Player of the Game
Wednesday, April 7, 2021	Tampa Bay Rays	Boston Red Sox	1:00 p.m.	Rays 2, Red Sox 9	Nathan Eovaldi
Thursday, April 22, 2021	Los Angeles Angels	Houston Astros	8:00 p.m.	Angels 2, Astros 8	Cristian Javier
Wednesday, April 28, 2021	Minnesota Twins	Cleveland Indians	1:00 p.m.	Twins 10, Indians 2	Byron Buxton
Thursday, May 6, 2021	Atlanta Braves	Washington Nationals	4:00 p.m.	Braves 3, Nationals 2	Drew Smyly
Thursday, May 13, 2021	St. Louis Cardinals	Milwaukee Brewers	1:30 p.m.	Cardinals 2, Brewers 0	Jack Flaherty
Thursday, May 20, 2021	San Francisco Giants	Cincinnati Reds	12:30 p.m.	Giants 19, Reds 4	Brandon Crawford
Thursday, May 27, 2021	Philadelphia Phillies	Miami Marlins	12:00 p.m.	Phillies 3, Marlins 2	Rhys Hoskins
Wednesday, June 2, 2021	New York Mets	Arizona Diamondbacks	3:30 p.m.	Mets 7, Diamondbacks 6	James McCann
Thursday, June 10, 2021	Los Angeles Dodgers	Pittsburgh Pirates	12:30 p.m.	Dodgers 6, Pirates 3 (8 innings)	Mookie Betts
Thursday, June 17, 2021	Detroit Tigers	Los Angeles Angels	9:30 p.m.	Tigers 5, Angels 7	Shohei Ohtani
Tuesday, June 22, 2021	Oakland Athletics	Texas Rangers	8:00 p.m.	Athletics 13, Rangers 6	Matt Chapman
Wednesday, June 30, 2021	Seattle Mariners	Toronto Blue Jays	7:00 p.m.	Mariners 9, Blue Jays 7 (10 innings)	Dylan Moore
Friday, July 9, 2021	Cincinnati Reds	Milwaukee Brewers	8:00 p.m.	Reds 2, Brewers 0	Wade Miley
Tuesday, July 20, 2021	Baltimore Orioles	Tampa Bay Rays	7:00 p.m.	Orioles 3, Rays 9	Francisco Mejía
Wednesday, August 11, 2021	Chicago White Sox	Minnesota Twins	1:00 p.m.	White Sox 0, Twins 1	Jorge Polanco
Tuesday, August 17, 2021	Toronto Blue Jays	Washington Nationals	7:00 p.m.	Blue Jays 6, Nationals 12	Riley Adams
Wednesday, August 25, 2021	Kansas City Royals	Houston Astros	2:00 p.m.	Royals 5, Astros 6 (10 innings)	Jake Meyers
Thursday, September 2, 2021	Milwaukee Brewers	San Francisco Giants	3:30 p.m.	Brewers 1, Giants 5	Logan Webb
Wednesday, September 8, 2021	Seattle Mariners	Houston Astros	2:00 p.m.	Mariners 8, Astros 5	José Marmolejos
Friday, September 17, 2021	Oakland Athletics	Los Angeles Angels	9:30 p.m.	Athletics 5, Angels 4	Matt Olson
Thursday, September 23, 2021	St. Louis Cardinals	Milwaukee Brewers	2:00 p.m.	Cardinals 8, Brewers 5	Paul Goldschmidt

=== 2022 ===
Date	Away team	Home team	Time (ET)	Score	Player of the Game
Thursday, May 5, 2022	Washington Nationals	Colorado Rockies	3:00 p.m.	Nationals 7, Rockies 9	Brendan Rodgers
Wednesday, May 11, 2022	Milwaukee Brewers	Cincinnati Reds	12:30 p.m.	Brewers 11, Reds 14	Tyler Stephenson
Wednesday, May 18, 2022	Pittsburgh Pirates	Chicago Cubs	7:30 p.m.	Pirates 3, Cubs 2	Jack Suwinski
Wednesday, May 25, 2022	Detroit Tigers	Minnesota Twins	1:00 p.m.	Tigers 4, Twins 2	Harold Castro
Wednesday, June 1, 2022	Kansas City Royals	Cleveland Guardians	1:00 p.m.	Royals 0, Guardians 4	Konnor Pilkington
Wednesday, June 8, 2022	Toronto Blue Jays	Kansas City Royals	2:00 p.m.	Blue Jays 4, Royals 8	Carlos Santana
Wednesday, June 15, 2022	Minnesota Twins	Seattle Mariners	4:00 p.m.	Twins 5, Mariners 0	Luis Arráez
Thursday, June 30, 2022	Tampa Bay Rays	Toronto Blue Jays	7:00 p.m.	Rays 1, Blue Jays 4	Teoscar Hernández
Wednesday, July 13, 2022	Milwaukee Brewers	Minnesota Twins	1:00 p.m.	Brewers 1, Twins 4	José Miranda
Wednesday, July 27, 2022	Minnesota Twins	Milwaukee Brewers	2:00 p.m.	Twins 4, Brewers 10	Rowdy Tellez
Thursday, August 11, 2022	Texas Rangers	Houston Astros	2:00 p.m.	Rangers 3, Astros 7	Framber Valdez
Wednesday, August 17, 2022	Seattle Mariners	Los Angeles Angels	4:00 p.m.	Mariners 11, Angels 7	Cal Raleigh
Thursday, August 25, 2022	Cleveland Guardians	Seattle Mariners	4:00 p.m.	Guardians 1, Mariners 3	Mitch Haniger
Thursday, September 1, 2022	Kansas City Royals	Chicago White Sox	2:00 p.m.	Royals 1, White Sox 7	Johnny Cueto
Thursday, September 8, 2022	Cincinnati Reds	Chicago Cubs	2:00 p.m.	Reds 4, Cubs 3	Jonathan India

== Viewership ==
The following is a list of the 10 most viewed MLB Game of the Week Live on YouTube games. Viewership is based on the publicly available viewership counter on YouTube.com.

Date	Away team	Home team	Viewership	Link
August 8, 2019	Philadelphia Phillies	San Francisco Giants	3.9M	
June 10, 2021	Los Angeles Dodgers	Pittsburgh Pirates	2.7M	
June 18, 2019	Los Angeles Dodgers	Philadelphia Phillies	2.2M	
June 17, 2021	Detroit Tigers	Los Angeles Angels	2M	
August 7, 2019	St. Louis Cardinals	Los Angeles Dodgers	1.7M	
June 30, 2021	Seattle Mariners	Toronto Blue Jays	1.5M	
July 23, 2019	Cleveland Indians	Toronto Blue Jays	1.3M	
April 22, 2021	Los Angeles Angels	Houston Astros	1.3M	
September 17, 2019	Tampa Bay Rays	Los Angeles Dodgers	1.2M	
May 13, 2021	St. Louis Cardinals	Milwaukee Brewers	1.1M	
