= Rob Manfred =

10th commissioner of Major League Baseball

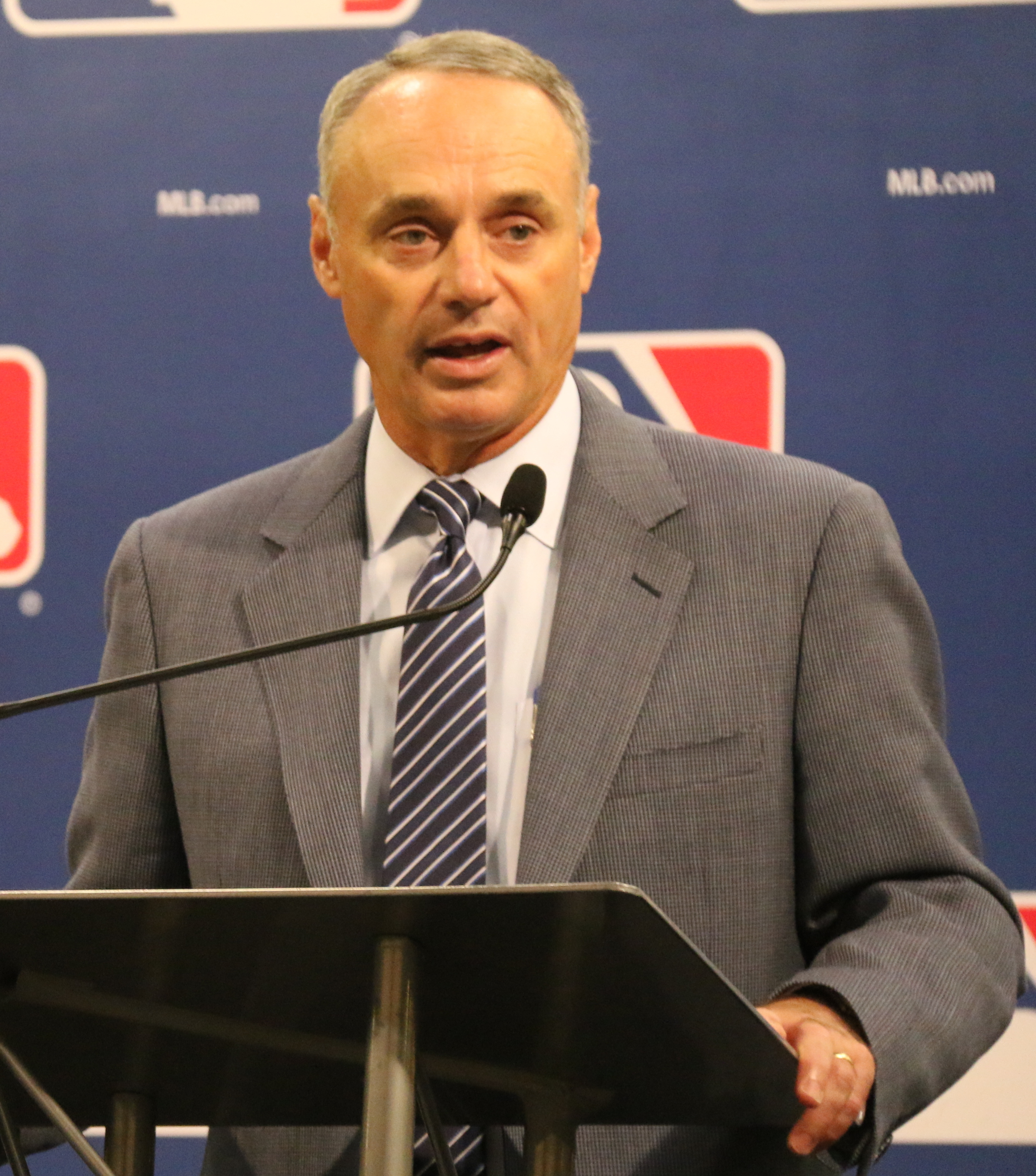
- Manfred in 2014

10th Commissioner of Baseball
- Incumbent
- Assumed office January 25, 2015
- Preceded by: Bud Selig

Chief Operating Officer of Major League Baseball
- In office September 28, 2013 – January 25, 2015
- Preceded by: Bob DuPuy
- Succeeded by: Tony Petitti

Personal details
- Born: September 28, 1958 (age 68) Rome, New York, U.S.
- Spouse: Colleen Manfred
- Children: 4
- Education: Le Moyne College; Cornell University (BS); Harvard University (JD)
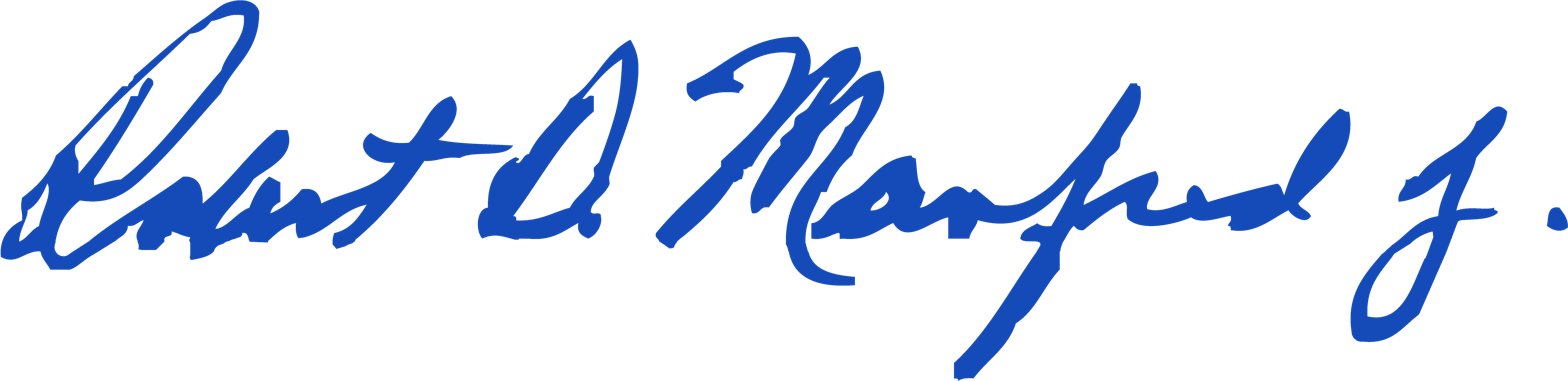
- Signature

Robert Dean Manfred Jr. (born September 28, 1958) is an American lawyer and business executive who is serving as the tenth commissioner of Major League Baseball (MLB). He previously served as MLB's chief operating officer. Manfred succeeded Bud Selig as commissioner on January 25, 2015. Manfred's tenure has seen a number of rule changes to the sport, including the introduction of the pitch clock and ghost runner rule. He has also overseen the expansion of the World Baseball Classic, MLB's reaction to the COVID-19 pandemic, and the Houston Astros sign stealing scandal.

== Early life and career ==
Manfred was born on September 28, 1958, in Rome, New York. As a child, he played tennis, golf and baseball, opting to focus on tennis by his eighth grade year, which he continued to play through college at Le Moyne. He attended Rome Free Academy and graduated in 1976. Manfred enrolled at Le Moyne College where he played tennis for the Dolphins for two seasons. In 1978, he transferred to Cornell University. He earned his Bachelor of Science from Cornell's School of Industrial and Labor Relations in 1980 and his Juris Doctor from Harvard Law School in 1983, where he was an editor of the Harvard Law Review.

After law school, Manfred clerked for Judge Joseph L. Tauro of the U.S. District Court for the District of Massachusetts from 1983 to 1984. He then joined the law firm Morgan, Lewis & Bockius, where he worked on labor and employment law.

== Major League Baseball ==
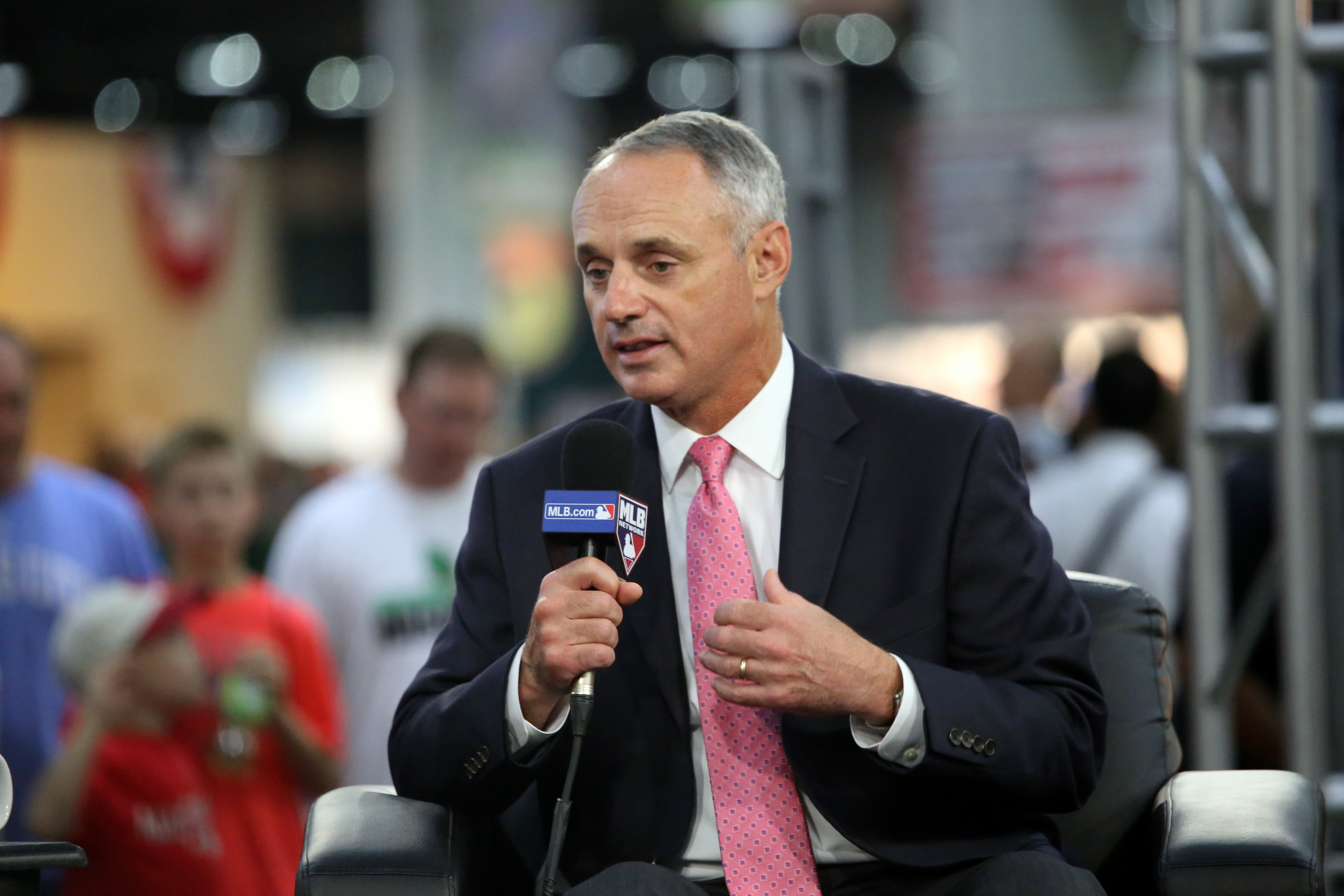
Manfred at the 2015 Major League Baseball All-Star Game

In 1987, Manfred began working with Major League Baseball (MLB) during collective bargaining. Following the 1994–95 MLB strike, he worked for the owners as a labor lawyer on their negotiating committee, eventually taking a lead position. He joined MLB on a full-time basis in 1998, serving as the Executive Vice President of Economics and League Affairs. Manfred negotiated MLB's first drug testing agreement with the Major League Baseball Players Association (MLBPA) in 2002, and represented MLB in negotiations with the MLBPA when forming new collective bargaining agreements in 2002, 2006 and 2011. In 2013, Manfred led MLB's investigation of the Biogenesis scandal.

At the end of the 2013 season, Commissioner of Baseball Bud Selig promoted Manfred to chief operating officer of MLB. The position had been vacant since Bob DuPuy resigned in 2010. Following the announcement of Selig's retirement, effective after the 2014 season, Manfred became a finalist to succeed him as Commissioner.

On August 14, 2014, MLB owners elected Manfred to succeed Selig, beating Boston Red Sox chairman Tom Werner and MLB executive vice president of business Tim Brosnan. Manfred assumed office on January 25, 2015. He stated that his primary goals as commissioner were youth outreach, embracing technology, quickening the pace of play, strengthening player relations, and creating a more unified business operation.

As commissioner, Manfred instituted rules before the start of the 2015 season to address the pace of play, including having batters remain in the batter's box and the installation of time clocks to limit the time spent around commercial breaks. For the 2017 season, no-pitch intentional walks were approved in MLB for the first time. The first Little League Classic was also played in August 2017, which received widespread praise. Before the 2018 season, Manfred introduced more rule changes to affect the pace of play, including reducing the time in commercial breaks and limiting player visits to the pitcher's mound. He has also advocated for expansion franchises, listing Portland, Las Vegas, Charlotte, Nashville, Montreal, and Vancouver as possible locations for new teams.

On November 15, 2018, the owners extended Manfred's contract through the 2024 season.

On July 26, 2023, his contract was extended through the 2028 season. In February 2024, Manfred said that he would step down when his contract expires in January 2029.

=== Broadcasting changes ===
In 2021, Manfred oversaw the beginning of the league's push toward streaming by placing games exclusively on Amazon Prime; while MLB-TV had offered a chance to stream live games since 2002, in 2021 the New York Yankees became the first team to offer certain broadcasts exclusively on Prime.

In May 2022, Peacock began airing a slate of games on Sunday mornings. Dubbed "MLB Sunday Leadoff", the games air starting at 11:30 or Noon Eastern Time and due to television rights, the Sunday morning game is offered in an exclusive window. As a result, all afternoon games were pushed back from 1:00 starts to 1:30.

In February 2025, the MLB opted out of its longstanding broadcast deal with ESPN to televise Sunday Night Baseball, ending a 35-year partnership with the network due to what league claimed was "a scaling back of coverage" by ESPN and demand for a reduction in rights fees. This includes the Home Run Derby and the Wild Card Series. The Sunday Night games moved to NBC, the first games on NBC in 25 years, while the Home Run Derby moved to Netflix.

=== All-Star Game changes ===
Starting in 2022, Manfred revived the practice of having "legend(s) picks" to the All-Star Game, recognizing players who were not voted into the game by fans or selected by managers, but who the league feels are deserving of special recognition.

In 2025, Manfred returned to the practice of having the All Star players wearing their teams' jerseys instead of custom "American League" or "National League" jerseys, which had been the case since 2021.

=== Houston Astros sign stealing scandal ===
In 2020, Manfred led an investigation that found that the Houston Astros had used illegal methods to steal signs during the 2017 season, in which they won the World Series, as well as part of the 2018 season. Manfred fined the team $5 million, the maximum allowed by the MLB constitution, and revoked their first- and second-round draft picks in 2020 and 2021. Astros manager A. J. Hinch and general manager Jeff Luhnow were each suspended for the entire 2020 season, including the playoffs. No Astros players were punished because they received immunity in exchange for their cooperation in the investigation.

Manfred was widely criticized for his handling of the situation. In an interview with ESPN, he defended his decision not to discipline players involved with the scandal, arguing that the MLBPA would not accept it. He also refused to strip the Astros of their 2017 World Series title because "It has never happened in baseball" and that he believed "that precedent happens and when you deviate from that, you have to have a very good reason." During this Manfred used the phrase "hunk of metal" to describe the Commissioner's Trophy. After many fans and players pushed back to the description, Manfred issued an apology, stating his intent was to make "a rhetorical point".

In June 2023, Manfred reflected on his decision to grant Astros players immunity and referred to it as "maybe not my best decision ever."

=== Impact of COVID-19 pandemic ===
On March 12, 2020, one day after the COVID-19 pandemic was declared by the World Health Organization, Major League Baseball cancelled spring training and delayed the start of the 2020 season by at least two weeks. Four days later, it was announced that the start of the season would be pushed back indefinitely due to the recommendation made by the CDC to restrict events of more than 50 people for eight weeks. On May 26, Manfred made the league's first proposal for the 2020 season, which included a reduction of the richest salaries by over 75 percent. This proposal was immediately rejected by the Players Association. The MLBPA later voted 33–5 to reject a proposal from Manfred and the owners for a 60-game season that would include an expanded postseason format and no provisions for salary guarantees in the event of a cancelled season, then rejected a third proposal for a 72-game season with 80% pro-rated pay. Manfred and the owners had also rejected the players' proposal for a 70-game season. On June 22, Manfred imposed a 60-game regular season that was unanimously approved by franchise owners. The season imposed by Manfred included the implementation of a sixteen-team postseason format (proposed by the players' union and later approved by the owners), a universal designated hitter and extra innings beginning with a runner on second base. (This latter rule change has been referred to by fans and media alike as the "Manfred Man", a play on the name of the musician.)

=== Inclusion of Negro leagues ===
In December 2020, Manfred announced that MLB would classify seven Negro leagues as additional major leagues, adding them to the six historical "major league" designations it made in 1969, thus recognizing statistics and approximately 3,400 players who played from 1920 to 1948. On May 28, 2024, MLB announced that it had integrated Negro league statistics into its records, which among other changes gives Josh Gibson the highest single-season major league batting average at .466 (1943) and the highest career batting average at .372.

=== 2021 All-Star Game relocation ===
On April 2, 2021, Manfred announced that the 2021 All-Star Game would be moved from Atlanta in protest of a voting reform law passed by Georgia's legislature. The move was supported by President Joe Biden and the MLBPA, the latter of whom claimed that the law "disproportionately disenfranchises the Black community." The decision was opposed both by Republican state officials including governor Brian Kemp and by several prominent Georgia Democrats including activist and former gubernatorial candidate Stacey Abrams and senator Raphael Warnock. The Atlanta Braves also opposed the move remarking that they were "deeply disappointed" by Manfred's decision and "businesses, employees and fans in Georgia are the victims of this decision." On April 5, Manfred announced that Coors Field in Denver, Colorado, would host the All-Star Game. On November 16, 2023, following an owners' meeting, Commissioner Rob Manfred announced that Major League Baseball would return to Atlanta for its 2025 All-Star Game.

=== 2021–22 lockout ===
Following the expiration of the league's collective bargaining agreement in December 2021, team owners unanimously voted to enact a lockout at 12:01 a.m. EST on December 2, indefinitely lasting until a new CBA was signed. Manfred formally announced the lockout in a press release titled "A letter to baseball fans," an action that received criticism from various baseball media members. After several rounds of meetings between MLB and the Major League Baseball Players Association that were described as "unproductive," the league set February 28 as a deadline to complete negotiations at Roger Dean Stadium in Jupiter, Florida, or else regular season games would begin to be cancelled. MLB and the MLBPA worked late into the night on contract negotiations on February 28, ignoring the deadline and working into the early morning hours of March 1. Around 2:30 a.m. EST on March 1, the league decided that there was enough progress on negotiations to push the deadline to 5:00 p.m. on the same day. As negotiations began to resume on March 1, a players' union representative stated that the two sides were further apart on key issues than what was being reported and claimed that Manfred and MLB were pushing an overly-optimistic storyline for their own gain. Just before the 5:00 p.m. deadline, the league contingent made a final offer that was ultimately turned down by the players' union. As a result, Manfred announced in a press conference outside Roger Dean Stadium that a chunk of the season's first games (later revealed to be the first two series) would be cancelled. Manfred received online criticism for smiling and laughing before and during the press conference.

As negotiations continued, Manfred announced that March 8 was the new deadline for an agreement to be in place or else more games would be cancelled. After another marathon of negotiations beginning on March 8 and stretching into the early hours of March 9, the deadline was extended as it had been in the previous week's deadline meeting. The league and the players' union once again failed to come to an agreement by the extended deadline because of the last-second inclusion of an international player draft in the owners' proposal. As a result, Manfred cancelled another two series, tentatively pushing the 2022 season's opening day to April 14. On March 10, Manfred and the league put the possibility of a 162-game season on the table if a deal could be met soon thereafter. That evening, the players' union accepted an MLB proposal that allowed the two sides to explore the international draft idea and come to decision on it by July 2022. The owners voted unanimously to ratify the agreement, ending the lockout. Manfred announced that opening day was being reverted back to April 7 and that the original first two series of the season would be played at later dates so that a full 162-game season could be conducted. In a subsequent press conference, Manfred said that he was relieved to see the lockout end and that he desired to improve his relationship with the players.

=== 2023 World Baseball Classic ===
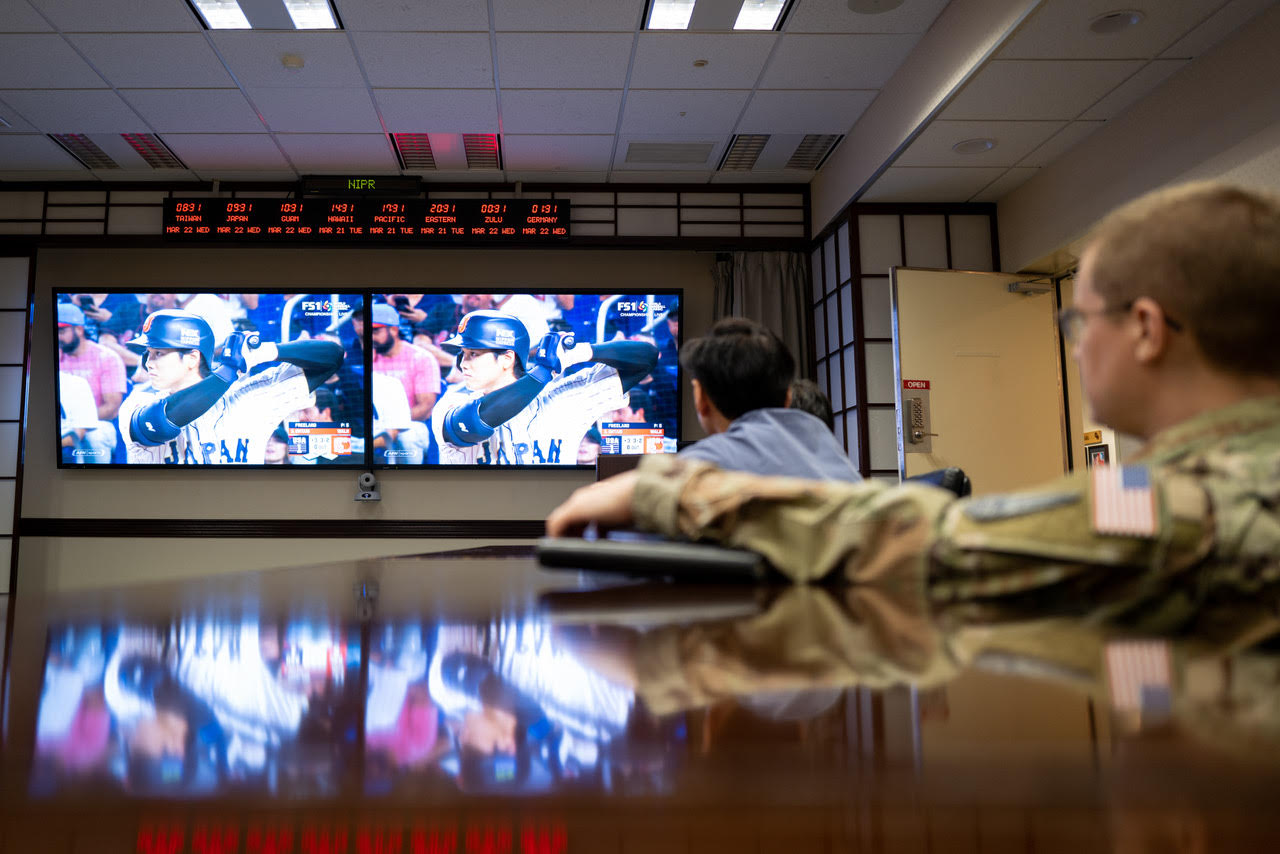
United States Forces Japan people watching 2023 World Baseball Classic championship

Manfred valued the World Baseball Classic from the beginning of his tenure, and the 2017 tourney drew 3.5 million viewers in the United States. After a six-year hiatus (longer than planned due to COVID-19 pandemic), Major League Baseball superstars such as Mike Trout and Mookie Betts joined Team USA for the 5th iteration of the tournament in 2023. The 2023 World Baseball Classic was broadcast in 163 territories through 63 media partners and received US$100 million in benefits.

The 2023 tournament was extremely popular in the United States and was broadcast nationwide on FOX. The finals between Japan and Team USA had an average combined viewership of 5.2 million Americans across FOX, FS1, and FOX Deportes and peaked at approximately 6.5 million Americans watching as Shohei Ohtani struck out Mike Trout for the game's final out to clinch the title for Japan.

The 2023 World Baseball Classic game between Japan and Korea recorded nearly 63 million viewers, higher than the 1980 World Series, making it one of the most viewed baseball games in history. In the Japanese archipelago, 100 million people watched the WBC, and over 55 million people within the Japanese archipelago watched the final game.

The 2023 tournament was broadcast in China on China's largest websites, including Weibo, Douyin, and Bilibili, Kuaishou. The match between China and Japan was watched by up to 422,000 people.

=== Oakland Athletics relocation to Las Vegas ===
On April 19, 2023, the Oakland Athletics, at the guidance of team owner John Fisher, announced a "binding deal" purchase of land in Las Vegas, Nevada for a new ballpark. The announcement indicated the team's intent to relocate out of their longtime home of Oakland, California after 57 seasons and four World Series championships. The proposed relocation of Oakland and the East Bay region's sole remaining major professional sports franchise comes on the heels of the city losing the NBA's Golden State Warriors to San Francisco in 2019 and the NFL's Oakland Raiders to Las Vegas in 2020, and has been described by national and international media as "catastrophic" for the community and "incalculable loss" for the community and larger East Bay region. The A's proposed relocation would make Oakland the first and only major city in history to be fully abandoned by North American major professional sports after hosting multiple teams across different sports.

The announcement was followed immediately by widespread condemnation, including public accusations of bad faith negotiating and intentionally-deceptive business practices on the part of the A's and Major League Baseball in negotiations with Oakland city officials. In 2023, Fisher, A's President Dave Kaval and Commissioner Manfred have repeatedly been caught or accused of knowingly giving false public statements and outright lying about the proposed Oakland Ballpark project, which began in 2018 and stalled sometime following the onset of the COVID-19 pandemic in 2020.

Public response to the proposed relocation of Oakland's only remaining major professional sports franchise has been widespread. Golden State Warriors owner Joe Lacob publicly stated he has a standing offer to buy the A's from Fisher and would privately fund a new ballpark for the team, though Fisher has repeatedly stated he will not willingly sell the team. Actor Tom Hanks, who worked as an Oakland A's hot dog vendor at the Oakland Coliseum as a teenager, on the topic of the A's proposed move to Las Vegas just after the departures of the Warriors and Raiders from town, stated "Damn them all to Hell." Other celebrities such as Green Day front man Billie Joe Armstrong have publicly joined the "SELL" movement, with the goal of convincing John Fisher to sell the team and allow it to remain in Oakland.

In July 2016, Manfred stated "I am committed to Oakland as a major league site. If we were to leave Oakland, I think 10 years from now, we would be more likely than not looking backward, saying we made a mistake."

In May 2021, Manfred's office announced that Major League Baseball had given the Athletics permission to explore relocation, citing slow progress on the proposed bayfront Oakland Ballpark.

In late October 2022, Manfred announced that he would instruct the league to waive the standard assessed relocation fee (estimated at $300 million) for Athletics ownership should the team choose to relocate specifically to Las Vegas. Manfred reiterated this in late July 2023, exacerbating the ire of other MLB owners frustrated with the "preferential treatment" Fisher and Las Vegas were receiving from Manfred.

In response to questions about the Tuesday June 13, 2023 "Reverse Boycott Game I", which drew the A's highest attendance of the season to date, more than triple the team's season attendance average to that point, Manfred condescendingly stated "It's great to see what is this year almost an average Major League Baseball crowd in the facility for one night. That's a great thing." He continued, erroneously stating, "There is no Oakland offer. They never got to the point where they had a plan to build a stadium at any site." In response to a question about several academic studies on the economic benefits to communities that contribute public funds for professional sports facilities, Manfred responded "I love academics; they're great . . . Academics can say whatever they want. I think the reality tells you something else." All three comments were met with widespread condemnation of the commissioner, with the comment of Oakland having "no plan to build a stadium at any site" being immediately disproven the same day by Oakland Mayor Sheng Thao and city officials, who in response publicly shared the plans for the proposed bay-front Howard Terminal ballpark at the edge of Downtown Oakland, opposite and in complement to the cross-bay San Francisco Giants' Oracle Park. Oakland city officials had been in negotiations with A's and MLB officials over the project since 2018 and into 2023, though Oakland city officials indicated the A's had seemingly stalled the project and begun to shy away from following through with it, starting sometime in 2020 following the onset of the COVID-19 pandemic. This claim was substantiated by the fact that the A's missed project deadlines without explanation, including a key city-mandated deadline for finalizing the stadium development plan in September 2022. Reports have indicated Fisher no longer has the financial capability to follow through with the Oakland ballpark project that he and his team proposed due to pandemic-related revenue losses and losses incurred by the declining stock prices of Gap Inc., which much of his net worth is tied to.

=== Reinstatements ===
On May 13, 2025, Manfred announced that the permanent bans on Pete Rose, Shoeless Joe Jackson, and seven other deceased players were lifted, making them eligible for the Baseball Hall of Fame. He also announced that anyone on the permanently ineligible list would automatically have their bans lifted after death. The decision was made in response to a petition filed by Rose's family.

== Personal life ==
Growing up in Central New York, Manfred is a fan of the New York Yankees. His father Rob Sr. led the Rome, New York, division of Revere Copper and Brass, while his mother Phyllis was a school teacher. He has an older sister and a younger brother.

Manfred and his wife, Colleen, have four children; Megan, Michael, Jane and Mary Clare. Megan married Timothy Petrella of Minnetonka, Minnesota, son of the president of UnitedHealthcare Group, at Immaculate Conception Catholic Church in Sleepy Hollow, New York.
