= Pace of play =

Baseball game speed

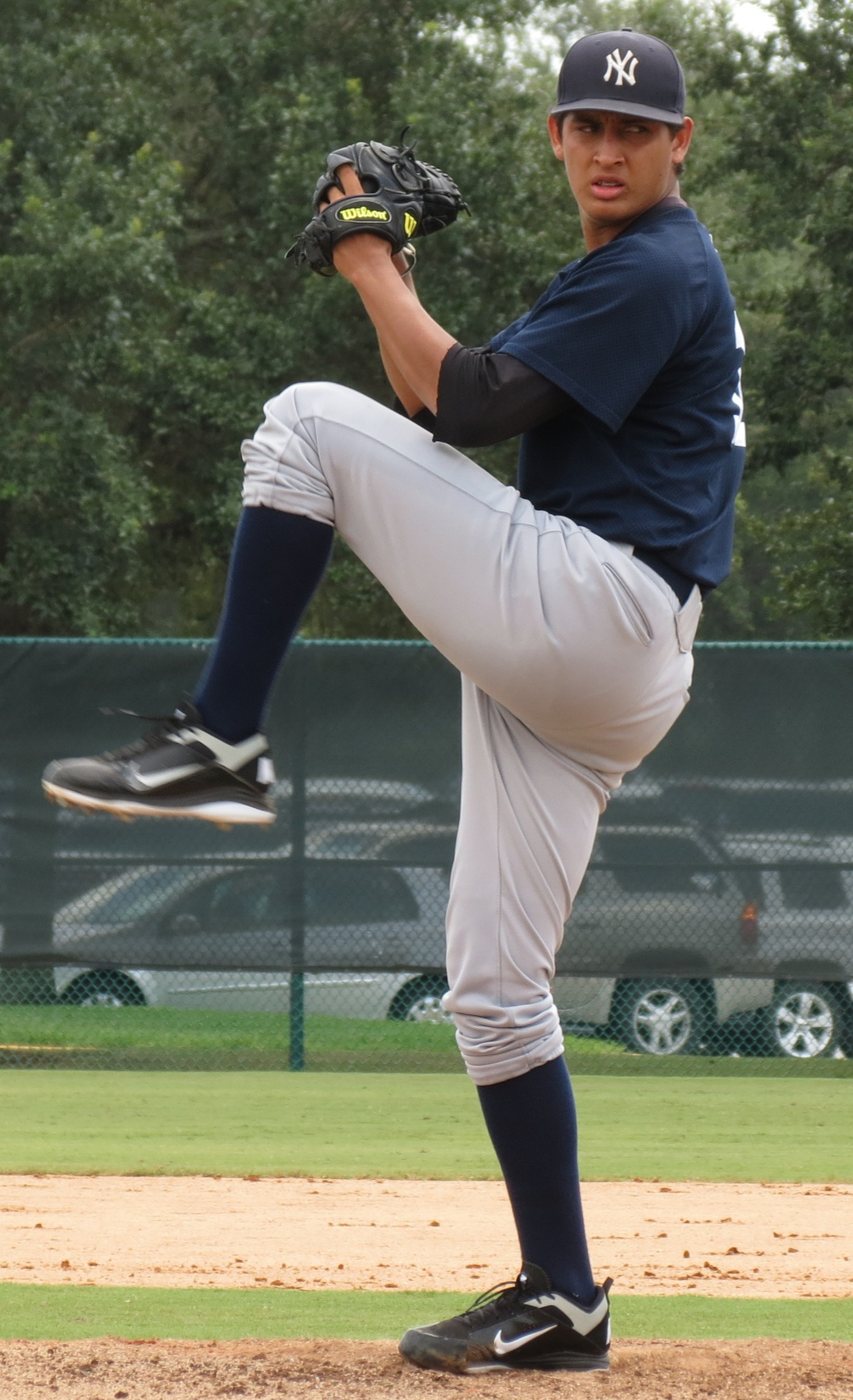
Giovanny Gallegos was one of the slowest pitchers during the 2022 MLB season

In baseball, pace of play refers to the length of time between in-game action, specifically the length of time a pitcher takes between their pitches. A slow pace of play can extend the length of games, which is regarded as an issue in college baseball and professional baseball. To accelerate the pace of play, leagues have instituted rule changes, such as the implementation of a pitch clock in Major League Baseball.

== Background ==
Game length in Major League Baseball (MLB) has increased over time, with the 1988 New York Yankees being the first team to average over three hours per game. From 2004 through 2014, MLB games increased from an average of 2.85 hours to 3.13 hours. This was in spite of decreases in scoring, with MLB teams scoring 4.1 runs per game in 2014, down from 5.14 in 2000.

The amount of time a pitcher takes between pitches directly affects pace of play, and varies widely. In the 2022 MLB season, the last season before the league implemented a pitch clock, the slowest working pitcher was Giovanny Gallegos of the St. Louis Cardinals, who averaged 25.8 seconds between pitches with the bases empty, while the quickest working pitcher was Wade Miley of the Chicago Cubs, who averaged 11.4 seconds.

== Rules changes ==
In college baseball, the Southeastern Conference experimented with a 20-second pitch clock during the 2010 season, and the National Collegiate Athletic Association instituted the pitch clock before the 2011 season for when no runners are on base. During the 2014 season, the Atlantic League of Professional Baseball instituted its own changes. These included using a 12-second pitch clock, reducing timeouts and warm-up pitches, and making intentional walks automatic by signalling the umpire, rather than throwing four intentional balls. The Arizona Fall League began using a pitch clock in 2014 and the Double-A and Triple-A levels of Minor League Baseball followed suit in 2015. Those levels saw a 12-minute reduction in game times.

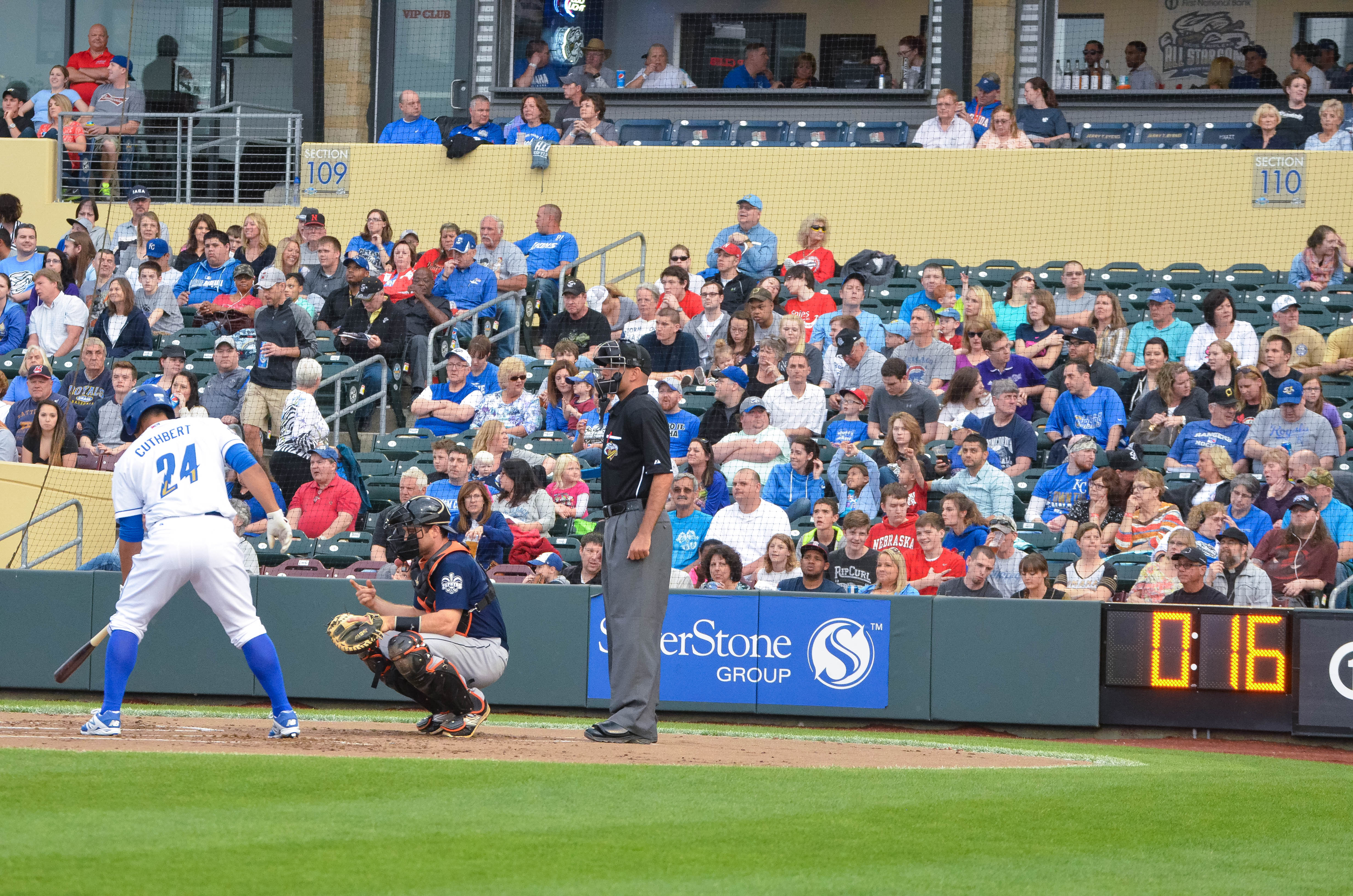
A pitch clock displayed at Werner Park in 2015

Towards the end of the 2014 season, Commissioner of Baseball Bud Selig announced the formation of a committee to examine the issue. John Schuerholz chaired the committee, which also included Sandy Alderson, Tony Clark, Rob Manfred, Joe Torre, and Tom Werner. Manfred, having succeeded Selig as the Commissioner in 2015, instituted rule changes to MLB before the start of the 2015 MLB season to address pace of play, including having batters remain in the batters box and the installation of time clocks to limit the time spent around commercial breaks. In 2015, MLB had a committee discuss bringing back the bullpen car.

Prior to the 2017 MLB season, the rules were amended to allow a manager to order an automatic intentional walk. MLB and the MLB Players Association (MLBPA) discussed the possibility of introducing the pitch clock at the major league level for the 2018 season. MLB opted against imposing it unilaterally, over the opposition of the MLBPA. Before the 2018 season, MiLB took major actions, including adding pitch clocks at all levels, beginning each extra inning with a runner on second base, and restricting the number of mound visits for full-season Class A through Triple-A teams. Also, the Arizona Diamondbacks of MLB announced they would introduce their first bullpen car in 2018. Minor League Baseball expanded its pace of play initiatives in 2019 by requiring Double-A and Triple-A pitchers to face a minimum of three consecutive batters unless the side is retired or the pitcher becomes injured and is unable to continue playing. Also, the number of allowed mound visits was reduced: Class A (9 visits), Double-A (7 visits), and Triple-A (5 visits).

As an experimental step to accelerate pace of play, MLB implemented 20-second pitch clocks during spring training games in 2019.

After a successful trial in Low-A West in 2021, MLB allowed teams to use PitchCom, a Wireless communications system that allows catchers to electronically signal to the pitcher which pitch they want thrown, starting in the 2022 season. During that season, New York Yankees manager Aaron Boone praised the system; nearly half 47% (25) of their first 54 games finished in three hours or less, compared to about 25% over the 2021 season. In the following season, pitchers were also allowed to use the system to signal their pitch to catchers.

On September 8, 2022, MLB announced a set of rules changes that would take effect in 2023, including the use of a pitch clock. These rules were implemented from the start of spring training prior to the 2023 season (though they were not in place for the World Baseball Classic, played during 2023 spring training) to allow players, managers and umpires to adjust to the rules. Player representatives to the competition committee, the body responsible for the rule changes, voted against implementing the pitch clock and infield positioning restrictions. The changes had been trialed in the minor leagues starting in the 2021 season, with larger bases tested in Triple-A games, defensive positioning limits in Double-A and limited step-offs in Single-A. The pitch clock was introduced at all minor league levels in 2022.

Among the 2023 rules changes designed to improve pace of play by leaving less dead time between pitches and balls in play were the following:

- Implementation of a pitch clock (or pitch timer): Upon receiving the ball from catcher or umpire, a pitcher will have 15 seconds to make their next pitch. If there is a runner on base this was extended to 20 seconds. (In 2024, the latter was reduced to eighteen seconds.) Exceeding this window will result in a ball being assessed. Batters must be in the batter's box, alert to the pitcher and ready to receive a pitch with no less than eight seconds left on the pitch clock. Batters not ready for a pitch with eight seconds remaining on the pitch clock are assessed a strike. Additionally, a thirty second clock will run between batters.
- Limited batter time-outs: Batters may only ask the umpire for a time-out once per at-bat. After a requested time-out the pitch clock will be restarted at fifteen (bases empty) or twenty (one or more runners on base) seconds.
- Limited pick-off attempts (or disengagements): Pitchers are allowed only two disengagements in any at-bat. These include both an actual throw to a base and a step-off from the pitching rubber. A third attempt that does not result in an out will be called a balk with baserunners advancing one base. First and second disengagements reset the pitch clock and a runner advancing via stolen base or balk resets the disengagement allowance.
- As in the last four seasons teams are limited to five mound visits per nine-inning game. Rectification of PitchCom malfunctions were excepted.
- To initiate a replay challenge, managers must now immediately signal that they are considering a challenge—rather than having ten seconds after a play to do so—and then must decide whether to formally challenge the call on the field within fifteen seconds instead of twenty seconds as before 2023.

Near the end of the 2023 spring training, MLB sent a memo to clubs clarifying some of these rules, among others, and noted that umpires had discretion to extend between-innings timing, delay the start of the pitch clock or make other allowances when the course of play required it, provided players were not viewed as attempting to game the system. In particular, this was meant to address situations when catchers required time to put on protective equipment between innings, when pitchers ended a play well away from the mound and to reduce the opportunities for pitchers to game the pitch clock with quick pitches. Further clarifications discouraged batters from trying to draw a quick pitch violation through deceptive actions or delay in coming "alert" to the pitcher.

Additional rule changes, including restrictions on defensive positioning in the infield and an increase in the size of bases, were also designed to result in more balls in play and more baserunning activity, though not explicitly to increase the pace of play. These are in part a reaction to stolen base totals reaching a fifty-year low in 2021 and the league-wide batting average reaching .243 in 2022, its lowest since 1968. Major League Baseball promoted these changes with an advertising campaign using the slogan, "Three New Rules. More Great Action."

2023 Spring training games played prior to March 22, 2023 averaged two hours, 36 minutes, about 25 minutes faster than the average time from 2022. Timing violations by pitchers and batters fell from 2.03 per game during the first week of spring training to 1.03 per game during the fourth week.

For games played in the first week of the 2023 season, average game time was more than a half-hour shorter that in the 2021 season. Only four of the 2023 season's first 97 games were longer than the average game time from the 2022 season. Pitch clock violations numbered 125 in the first 141 games of the 2023 season, or .89 per game, with about two thirds of these violations called on the pitcher.
