= Catcher =

Defensive position in baseball and softball played behind home plate, facing the field

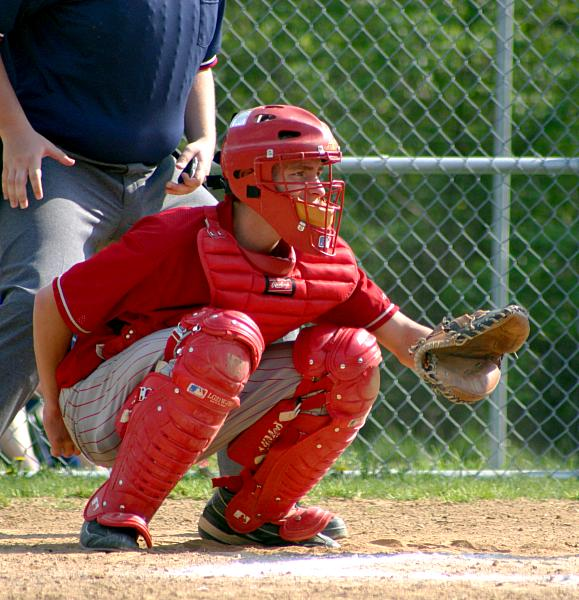
A high school baseball catcher, 2004.

Catcher is a position in baseball and softball. When a batter takes their turn to hit, the catcher crouches behind home plate, in front of the (home) umpire and receives the ball from the pitcher. In addition to this primary duty, the catcher is also called upon to master many other skills in order to field the position well. The role of the catcher is similar to that of the wicket-keeper in cricket.

Positioned behind home plate and facing toward the outfield, the catcher can see the whole field and is therefore in the best position to direct and lead the other players in a defensive play. The catcher typically calls for pitches using PitchCom, or hand signals. The calls are based on the pitcher's mechanics and strengths, as well as the batter's tendencies and weaknesses. Essentially, the catcher controls what happens during the game when the ball is not "in play". Foul tips, bouncing balls in the dirt and contact with runners during plays at the plate are all events to be handled by the catcher, necessitating the use of protective equipment. This includes a mask, chest and throat protectors, shin guards, and a heavily padded catcher's mitt. Though rare, some chest protectors may extend lower to provide some shield to the genitalia; wearing a pelvic protector or cup, depending on the case, is preferred and more common.

Because the position requires a comprehensive understanding of the game's strategies, the pool of former catchers yields a disproportionate number of managers in both Major League Baseball and Minor League Baseball, including such prominent examples as Yogi Berra, Connie Mack, Steve O'Neill, Al López, Mike Scioscia, Joe Girardi, Stephen Vogt, and Joe Torre. The physical and mental demands of being involved in every defensive play can wear catchers down over a long season, and can have a negative effect on their offensive output. As a result, catcher is the only position (other than pitcher) to not have a member of the 3,000 hit club (not counting Craig Biggio, who only played four seasons as a catcher and was a second baseman when he reached the milestone); the current hit leader for the position is Iván Rodríguez, with 2,844.

Because of the strategic defensive importance of catching, if a catcher has exceptional defensive skills, teams are often willing to overlook their relative offensive weaknesses. A knowledgeable catcher's ability to work with the pitcher, via pitch selection and location, can diminish the effectiveness of the opposing team's offense. Many great defensive catchers toiled in relative anonymity, because they did not produce large offensive numbers. Notable examples of light-hitting, defensive specialists were Jerry Grote, Jeff Mathis, Martín Maldonado, Ray Schalk, Jim Hegan, Jim Sundberg and Brad Ausmus. Schalk's career batting average of .253 is the lowest of any position player in the Baseball Hall of Fame. His selection for enshrinement in 1955 was largely a tribute to his outstanding defensive skills.

In the numbering system used to record baseball plays, the catcher is assigned the number '2'. (See Baseball scorekeeping.)

== History and evolution of the position ==
(C) Catcher's position behind home plate

In the middle of the nineteenth century, the game of baseball began to evolve from a sport played by amateurs for recreation into a more serious game played by professionals. One of the most dramatic changes was the transition of the pitcher's delivery from an underhand motion to an overhanded throw. Before the American Civil War, the pitcher's role was to initiate the action by offering an underhanded throw to the batter, in much the same way that a basketball referee offers up a jump ball to begin play. Since this type of pitching often caused the batter to hit lazy, foul pop-ups, catchers played their position approximately twenty to twenty-five feet behind the batter, and wore no protective equipment.

As the game progressed towards professionals and became more serious, pitchers began to attempt to prevent the batter from hitting the ball by throwing faster pitches. With the introduction of the called strike in 1858, catchers began inching closer to home plate due to the rules requirement that a strikeout could only be completed by a catch. The rules governing the delivery of pitches proved to be hard to enforce, and pitchers continued to stretch the boundaries of the rules until the 1870s when the release point of pitches had reached the pitcher's waist level. Pitchers had begun throwing overhand by 1884, when the National League made a rule change removing all restrictions on the pitcher's delivery.

These developments meant that catchers began to take on a crucial defensive role, as a pitcher's deceptive deliveries could only be effective if the catcher was capable of fielding them. The progression of the catcher positioning themselves closer to the plate would lead to changes in pitching deliveries that would revolutionize the sport. In the 1870s, pitcher Candy Cummings was able to introduce the curveball because his catcher, Nat Hicks, fielded his position in close proximity to home plate and was able to catch the deceptive pitch. Other specialized pitches such as the spitball and the knuckleball followed, which further emphasized the defensive importance of the catcher's position.

At about the same time that catchers began fielding their position closer to home plate, baseball teams began using a less rubbery ball which led to a decline in the number of runs scored. In the 1860s it was common for teams to score fifty or sixty runs in a game. The combination of the new, harder ball and the continuation of the rise in pitcher's release points helped usher in what became known as the Dead-ball era. The decrease in run production placed greater significance on stolen bases and bunts, which in turn emphasized the crucial defensive role played by catchers. In 1901, the National League introduced a new rule specifying that the catcher must stand within 10 feet of home plate. The American League adopted the rule the following year.

The rising velocity of pitches in conjunction with catchers gradually moving closer to home plate significantly increased the risk of injuries for catchers, especially face and hand injuries. By the late 1870s, catchers began to use padded, fingerless gloves to protect their hands, and in 1877 the first protective catcher's mask was used. The first catchers to use protective masks sometimes had their courage called into question, but the effectiveness of the masks in preventing injuries meant that they became widely accepted. In the 1880s, the first padded chest protectors came into use, and in 1888 specialized catcher's mitts used on the non-throwing hand began to be used. William S. Schenck of Princeton University was the first to use chest protectors when he stuffed copies of The Daily Princetonian under his shirt during a game against Harvard University. A Boston sporting goods company noticed his innovation and began producing the wearable chest pads.

The final pieces of protective gear were shin guards which were first worn by catcher Roger Bresnahan in 1907. Together, the rules changes and the new protective equipment transformed the catcher's defensive role to the way that it is presently played.

A catcher (for the Hiroshima Toyo Carp) in Japan catching a strike, 2024

== Catching pitches ==
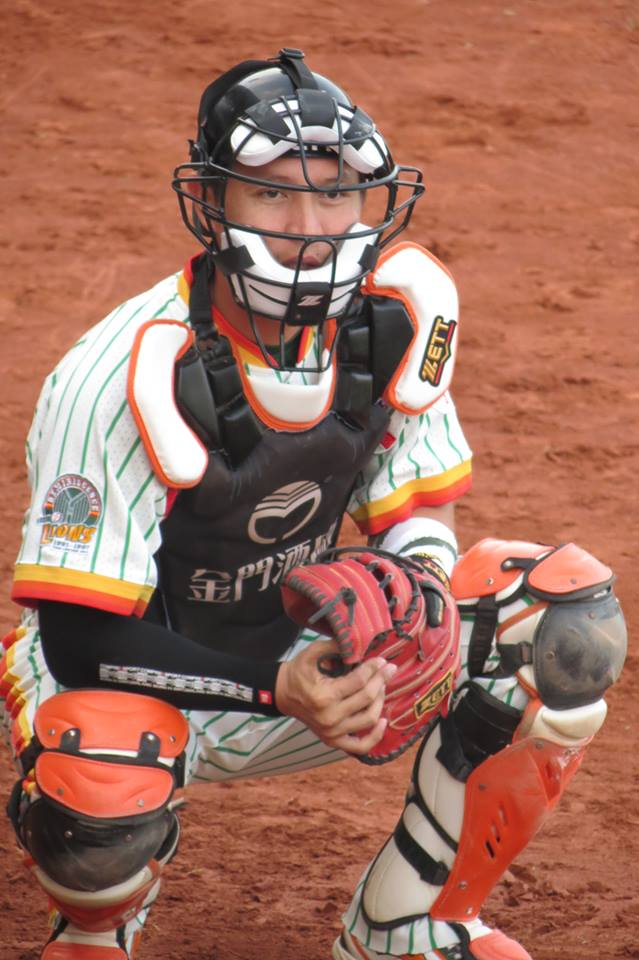
Uni-President Lions catcher Kao Chih-kang preparing for a game

The catcher is usually the first to notice the tendencies, quirks, and peculiarities of each home-plate umpire. Some umpires favor high strikes, pitched balls that are technically above the strike zone but appear, to the umpire, to be good. Conversely, some umpires will call low pitches strikes even when they are slightly below the knees. Other umpires have an inside bias or an outside bias; some umpires have more than one bias; some are uniformly lenient; some have very restricted notions of the strike zone, and the pitcher will constantly feel that their pitches are unfairly judged. The catcher can exploit an umpire's tendencies by taking them into account in when receiving the ball.

The catcher can help their pitcher get more strike calls from the umpire by using a technique called "framing". This practice is a matter of a catcher keeping the mitt inside the strike zone, or making the pitch appear as close to the strike zone, when receiving the pitch, thereby giving the plate umpire the impression that the pitch is in the strike zone, even if it is not. When framing, a catcher will also hold their mitt still for a second or two so that the umpire has an opportunity to thoroughly consider their call (and, hopefully, let their innate biases influence their decision in a direction favorable to the catcher's team).

The catcher, when receiving a borderline pitch, usually has several options in how they make the catch. They can catch the pitch in the webbing of their mitt or in the heel; they can catch the pitch on their forehand or backhand, as necessary; they can catch a low pitch with the mitt pointed upward or downward. These choices help the catcher to create a favorable presentation (or frame) for the umpire.

A variation on "framing" is called "pulling pitches". The general approach is to catch the half of the ball that is outside the strike zone and show the umpire only the half of the ball, lodged in the mitt, that is closer to the zone. The illusion is often enhanced with a slight 'tug' of the mitt (of an inch or two) toward the strike zone.

By rule, the catcher must station directly back of the plate (generally in the catcher's box) the moment a pitch is thrown but may leave at any time to catch a pitch or make a play. The moment an intentional ball leaves a pitcher's hand, the catcher must have both feet in the catcher's box. The catcher is the only defensive player who is allowed to be in foul territory when a pitch is thrown.

=== Catcher's balk ===
A catcher's balk occurs when the catcher is not properly set in the designated box. Once the pitcher releases the ball and the catcher is caught outside of this zone, the play is thrown out. The term "catcher's balk" is not official, but it is common to hear among catchers and umpires alike.

=== Catcher's interference ===
If a pitch is thrown and the catcher has extended their arm resulting in the catcher's glove being contacted by the batter's swinging bat, a catcher's interference is called, and the batter is awarded first base. This is recorded as an error. If the bases were loaded, it results in a run being scored, but since it is an error, the batter is not credited with a run batted in. The catcher's interference call is uncommon. Also, an interference penalty may be declined by the batting team, such as when a better result ensues.

== Blocking balls in the dirt ==
To block balls that a pitcher throws on a bounce toward home plate (pitches that are said to be "in the dirt"), the catcher will slide their body to the left or right, as necessary, to place themselves directly in the path of the ball. Once in position, they push towards the ball while dropping to their knees, place their mitt between their legs to prevent the ball from passing through, and lean forward to deaden the rebound when, and if, the ball bounces off their thigh or torso. Although inexperienced catchers may try to catch the errant pitch with the mitt, coaches often prioritize the catcher's ability to "keep the ball in front of the body" than to make a catch with their mitt. Ideally, the catcher will be able to knock the ball to the ground where it will stop within arm's reach. To perform this properly, without the ball being deflected in an undesirable direction, the catcher must angle their body so that their chest is always leaning forward, toward home plate. Tucking your chin or looking the ball in will help with deadening the ball like this. This maneuver is often difficult, and its difficulty depends largely on how fast the ball is traveling, the angle at which the ball is thrown into the ground, where it first hits the ground, the firmness of the ground it hits, and the manner in which it is spinning.

== Calling the game ==
As of April 2011, 15 of 30 Major League Baseball managers were former catchers. Because catchers are considered a captain on the field (and some, such as Thurman Munson and Jason Varitek were in fact team captains), they are often in charge of planning defensive plays; thus, the catcher will give signs to the pitcher for what pitch is to be thrown.

Calling the game refers to the act of catchers deciding the type of pitch delivered to home plate. The responsibility for selecting the type of pitch was traditionally made by the catcher. It is not unusual for a catcher to briefly look at the posture and position of the batter-in-turn prior to calling the next pitch; even the way a batter holds the bat may shed some indication of what the strategy may be. The selection of which pitch to use can depend on a wide variety of situations such as the type of hitter that is being faced, whether there are any base runners, how many outs have been made in the inning, or the current score, among others.

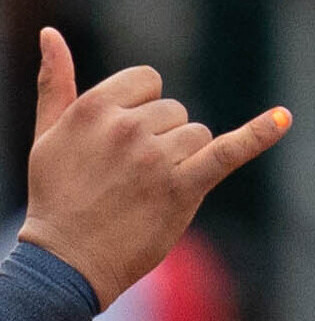
Ali Sánchez's orange-painted fingernail during a 2022 game for the Toledo Mud Hens

Since a catcher uses their fingers to signal and communicate with the pitcher, they may wear colorful stickers on their nails to accentuate the motion of the fingers and thus help with the visibility of the signal. As an alternative, the catcher may wear painted nails, such as with fluorescent polish.

Starting in 2022, Major League catchers began wearing a PitchCom device on their wrist. This was done in an attempt to curb the prevalence of sign stealing, which reached its peak after the Houston Astros were caught stealing signs during their World Series-winning 2017 season.

== Throwing ==
A catcher nearly always throws with their right hand since most hitters are right-handed and stand to the left side of the plate when batting, so a catcher who throws left-handed is forced to take some time to sidestep (or otherwise avoid) the right-handed hitter when they throw from behind the plate. In addition, a lefty's throw would tend to come in on the shortstop side of the bag, while a righty's throw would be on the second base side of the bag, which is where the runner is coming in. Consequently, players who are left-handed rarely play catcher. Left-handed catchers have only caught eleven big-league games since 1902, and Jack Clements, who played for 17 years at the end of the nineteenth century, is the only man in the history of baseball to play more than three hundred games as a left-handed catcher. However, some observers, including the famed statistician Bill James and ESPN writer Rob Neyer, have suggested that the real reason that there are no left-handed catchers is because left-handed players with strong throwing arms are almost always encouraged, at an early age, to become pitchers. Benny Distefano, the last lefty thrower to catch a big-league game (in 1989), noted that lefty catchers have difficulty on bunts up the third base line and on fielding throws home for plays at the plate. Others suggest that fielding bunts up the 3rd base line would give the catcher a better throw to 1st base or 2nd base.

== Defensive plays ==
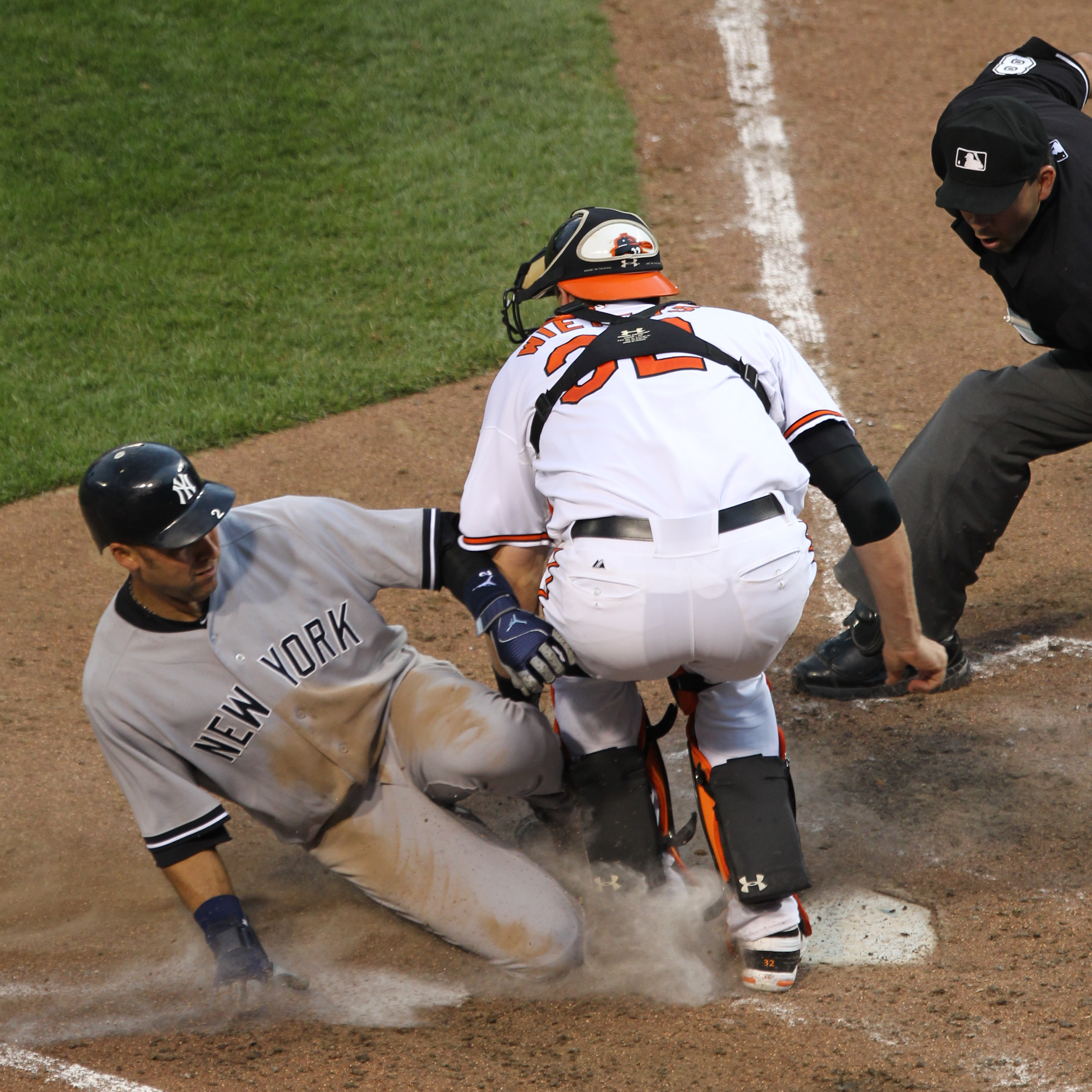
Catcher Matt Wieters blocks runner Derek Jeter from tagging home plate.

Unlike the other fielders, the catcher and pitcher must start every play in a designated area. The catcher must be behind home plate in the catcher's box, while the pitcher must be on the pitcher's mound, with one foot in contact with the pitcher's rubber. Once the ball is in play, however, the catcher and pitcher, like the other fielders, can respond to any part of the field necessary to make or assist in a defensive play. The defensive plays expected of catchers, aside from managing the pitcher by calling for pitches and catching them, include:

Preventing wild pitches and avoiding passed balls. Although the pitcher has a responsibility to throw with reasonable accuracy, catchers must be mobile enough to catch (or block) errant pitches. By doing so, a catcher prevents baserunners from advancing while the loose ball is retrieved. An errant pitch that eludes the catcher and allows a baserunner to take one or more additional bases is called a wild pitch. (Techniques for blocking wild pitches are described in the previous section.) A pitched ball which would require only ordinary effort to be caught or blocked by the catcher—but is nonetheless misplayed, allowing a base runner to advance—is called a "passed ball".

Fielding high pop flies, often hit at unusual angles. In this case, the catcher must turn their back to the field in order to properly account for the spin of the ball, which often follows unpredictable paths.

Fielding catchable foul balls, in foul territory near the home plate.

Fielding weakly hit fair ground balls (including bunts) in front of home plate in order to throw to a base to complete a groundout or a fielder's choice play. The catcher must avoid hitting the batter-runner with the thrown ball, implying that they must move to a position in which they have a clear throw to the infielder at first base.

Guarding home plate on plays in which a baserunner attempts to score a run. The catcher is often obliged to catch a ball thrown from a fielder and to tag out a runner arriving from third base. Naturally, the runner's objective, in this situation, is to elude the catcher's tag and touch the plate. Prior to 2014, the catcher's best strategy was to block the runner's path so as to prevent the runner from reaching the plate at all. Collisions between runners and catchers were common. Since the start of the 2014 season, a catcher may only obstruct a runner's path to home plate when he, the catcher, is in possession of the ball. Without the ball in hand, the catcher must allow the runner to score uncontested. If the catcher drops the ball while tagging the runner, the runner is safe. Although contact between a runner and a catcher was generally allowed in the major leagues until the beginning of the 2014 season, little league, high school, and college runners are encouraged or mandated to avoid significant contact.

Preventing stolen bases by throwing to second base or third base to allow an infielder to tag a baserunner attempting to reach the base. A catcher who is very good at preventing stolen bases is said to have a low stolen-base percentage. (A pitcher who is slow to deliver is often more at fault for stolen bases than the catcher is.) Ideally, a catcher should be able to get the ball from their glove to that of the player covering second base in under two seconds. This is referred to as a catcher's "pop time", the time elapsing between the popping sound of the pitch striking the catcher's mitt and the similar pop when the ball arrives at the glove of the fielder covering second base.

Rarely, a catcher can make a successful pick-off throw to a base to surprise an inattentive or incautious baserunner. Especially at the higher levels of baseball (where this play almost never results in an out), the catcher's snap throws are mainly for psychological effect. If the runner knows that the catcher often attempts snap throws, the runner is likely to take a smaller lead from their base before each pitch, which will allow the infielders an extra fraction of a second to throw the runner out at the next base if they attempt to advance (as, for example, when a ground ball is hit). Yadier Molina of the St. Louis Cardinals and former MLB catcher Iván Rodríguez are known for using pickoffs with success, particularly at first base. Teams may sometimes call a deliberate play, the pitchout, wherein the pitcher intentionally throws the ball wide and high to the catcher, who comes out of their crouch to receive it and relays the ball quickly to a base to put a runner out.

Rarely, a catcher will run to first base or third base to participate in rundown plays at those bases.

In certain game situations, typically a ball batted to the shortstop or third baseman with no runners on base, the catcher may be expected to back-up first base in case the first baseman misses or mishandles a throw.

In certain game situations, when a runner is on first and the batter bunts the ball or hits the ball softly, which causes the third baseman to rush in to get the ball and throw to first base, the catcher must cover third base so that the runner from first base does not advance to third base on the play and this then forces the third baseman to cover home plate.

Any failure by the catcher can have dire consequences for their team. Passed balls are possible whenever one or more runners are on base. A failure to catch a ball thrown from the outfield on a play at home plate, or a failure to tag a runner, means that the defensive team fails to record an all-important out and, instead, it allows a run. On an attempt to prevent a stolen base, a catcher's bad throw might careen past the infielder and skip into the outfield, allowing an additional advance by the baserunner.

Though not exactly a play, "psyching the batter" refers to a casual attempt by the catcher to distract the batter prior to the pitcher throwing the ball. As long as it does not fall in a lack of sportsmanship, such as offensiveness, and as long as the umpire permits it, the catcher may mention a specific throw or say something funny to try to distract the opponent to cause them to err.

== Personal catcher ==
Because of the close mental relationship and trust that a successful pitcher must have with his catcher, a number of catchers throughout history have become preferred by pitchers, to the point that the catcher will almost always (especially during the regular season) start along with the pitcher. The catcher is then informally referred to as that pitcher's personal catcher.

Naturally, the potential problem with this arrangement is that if the pitcher prefers to work with the team's backup catcher, then the regular catcher—presumably the better player—must be benched. However, because of the physically grueling nature of the position, many "regular" catchers are asked to either rest relatively frequently or play a different position such as first base or designated hitter.

Personal catchers are often used for pitchers who specialize in throwing knuckleballs because of the difficulty of catching such an inconsistent and erratic pitch.

Some personal catchers have included:

- Paul Bako, Henry Blanco, Charlie O'Brien, and Eddie Pérez for Greg Maddux (Note: This one does not really belong, as the others on the list were specifically linked to a pitcher as the one catcher they were most comfortable throwing to, while Greg Maddux's "personal catcher" was whoever was the backup to Javiér Lopez, who Maddux adamantly did not want catching his games.)
- Austin Barnes and A.J. Ellis for Clayton Kershaw
- Kevin Cash, George Kottaras, and Doug Mirabelli for knuckleballer Tim Wakefield
- Tony Cruz for Lance Lynn
- Joe Girardi for David Cone and Andy Pettitte
- Carlos Hernández for Ramón Martínez
- Bruce Kimm for Mark Fidrych
- Tim McCarver for Steve Carlton
- José Molina for A.J. Burnett
- David Ross for Jon Lester
- Héctor Sánchez for Tim Lincecum
- Josh Thole for knuckleballer R. A. Dickey
- Bob Uecker for knuckleballer Phil Niekro
- Connor Wong for Brayan Bello

== Injury ==
The catcher is the most physically demanding position in baseball, more so than the pitcher. Despite being heavily padded, catchers routinely suffer some of the worst physical abuse in baseball. The catcher has the physically risky job of blocking the plate to prevent base runners from reaching home and scoring runs. Catchers also constantly get bruised and battered by pitches, foul balls, and occasionally the bat in an undisciplined follow-through of the batter's swing.

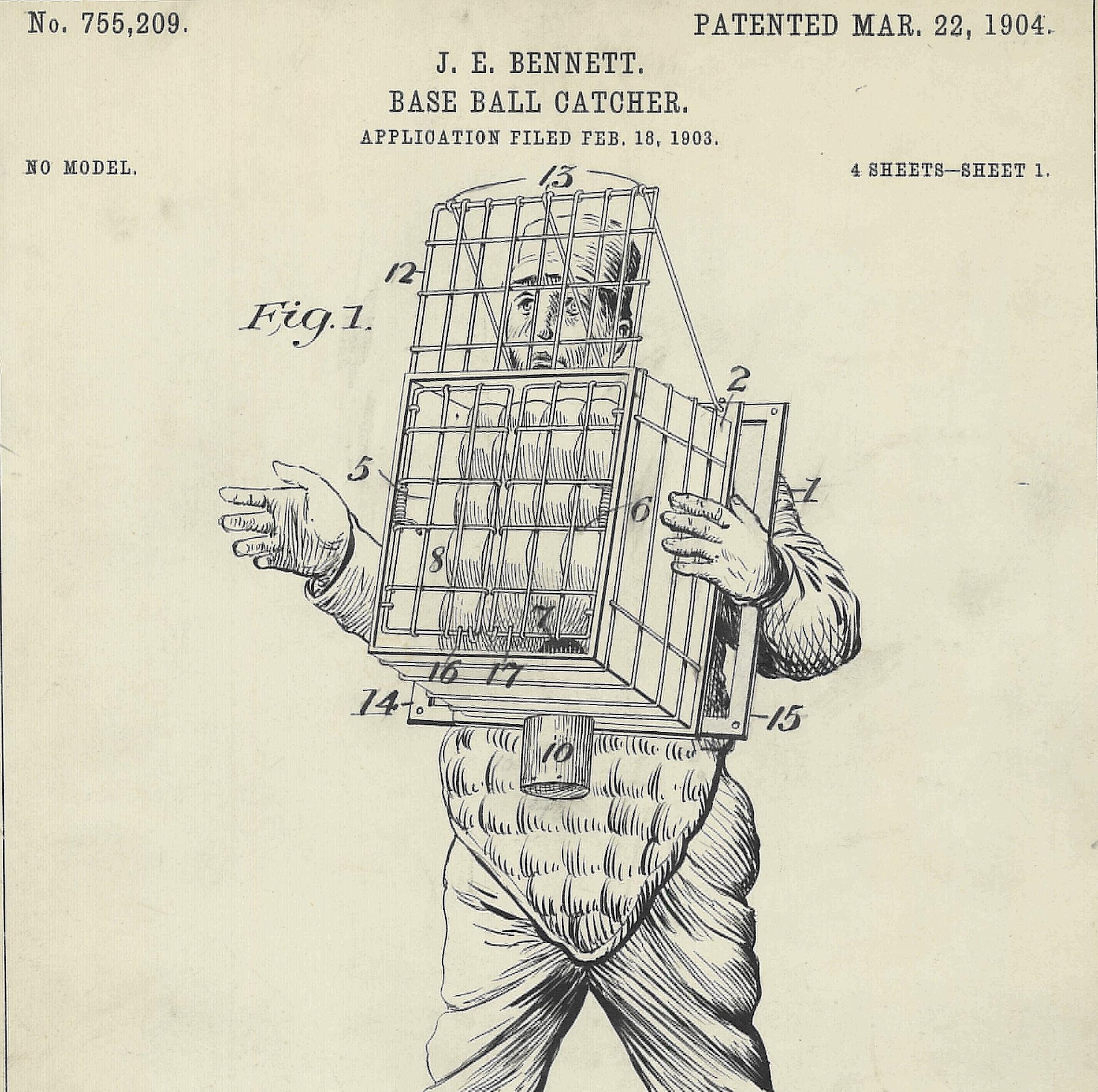
1904 US Patent for Catcher Protective Equipment

Catchers also are prone to knee ailments stemming from the awkward crouching stance they assume. Because of this, catchers have a reputation for being slow baserunners (perhaps the most notable of whom is Ernie Lombardi); even if they have speed at the beginning of their careers, the eventual toll taken on their knees slows them down, although there are some exceptions, such as Manny Sanguillén and Jason Kendall. Some players who begin their career as catchers are moved to other positions in order to preserve their running speed, increase their availability for games (mainly catchers with either poor defensive skills, recurring injuries, or were blocked by the presence of a more talented catcher), and take advantage of their prowess with the bat. Prominent examples of catchers switching position (mainly first base) in mid-career include Mike Napoli, Craig Biggio, B. J. Surhoff, Joe Torre, Víctor Martínez, Joe Mauer, Carlos Santana, Brandon Inge, and Dale Murphy (although Murphy was also known as a poor thrower to the pitcher and to second base, nearly hitting pitchers in the process).

As a result, catchers often have shorter careers than players at other positions; consequently, few catchers hold batting records that require many seasons of play to compile. Mike Piazza is the only catcher in history with more than 400 career home runs, and no catcher has amassed 3,000 career hits (Iván Rodríguez leads all Major League catchers with 2,844 hits). Although 3,000 hit club member Craig Biggio played his first three full seasons as a catcher, he played his remaining sixteen seasons at second base and in the outfield.

The larger or heavier the catcher, the greater the health risks associated with repeatedly assuming a crouching or squatting position; knees and backs are especially vulnerable to "wear-and-tear" injuries. Catchers also have an increased risk of circulatory abnormalities in the catching hand. A study of minor-league ballplayers showed that, of 36 players in various positions, all nine of the catchers had hand pain during a game, and several had chronic pain in the catching hand. Catching high-speed pitches can, in some cases, cause the index finger on the gloved hand to swell to twice the size of the other fingers. Ultrasound and blood-pressure tests showed altered blood flow in the gloved hand of five of the catchers, a far higher incidence than in the hands of players at other baseball positions.

== Equipment ==
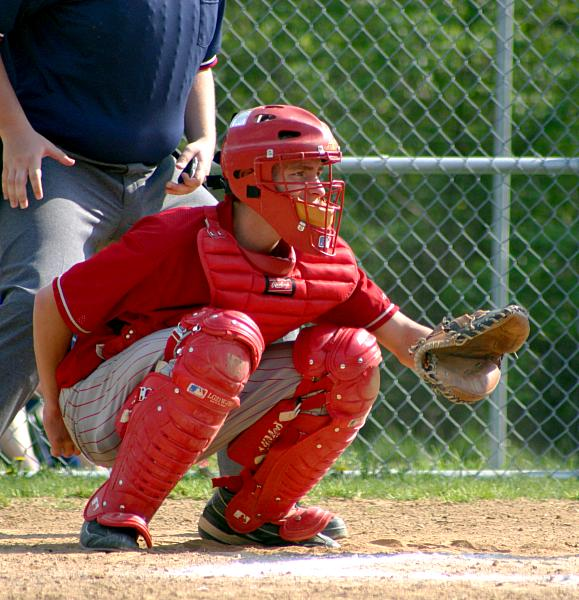
A catcher in customary squatting position (wearing a "hockey-style" mask) prepares to receive a pitch.

Catchers in baseball use the following equipment to help prevent injury while behind the plate:

- Catcher's mask: To protect the face, much of the side of the head, and, often, part of the throat. In recent years, catchers have begun wearing masks similar to those worn by ice-hockey goaltenders. The hockey-style mask typically includes a section which protects the top of the head; older-style masks are usually worn over a flap-less helmet (worn backwards and often with a trimmed bill) to provide similar protection to the skull. The older style masks are now banned by the National Federation of State High School Associations.
- Catcher's mitt: Catchers use mitts with extra padding to lower the impact of the ball on their hand. The catcher is the only player on the field who is allowed to use this type of mitt. (The first baseman also wears a mitt instead of a glove, but it is longer and not as heavily padded as a catcher's mitt.) See Catcher's mitt.
- Leg guards: To protect the knees and legs from the impact of a ball that the catcher is unable to play cleanly. Less commonly called 'spike protectors', they are used to prevent injury caused by base-runners advancing home with 'spikes up', that is, with the intention of injuring or intimidating the catcher with their metal cleats. Most modern styles of shin guard also incorporate a flap that covers the top of the foot.
- Chest protector: A piece of equipment, padded with rubber, plastic foam, or gel, that protects the catcher's body while blocking as well as from the impact of a pitch if they fail to catch it. Many modern chest protectors also have an extension to cover the shoulder of the non-throwing or "glove" hand.
- Cup: Worn by a catcher under their uniform to mitigate the risk of serious injury when a batted or thrown ball strikes the groin area.

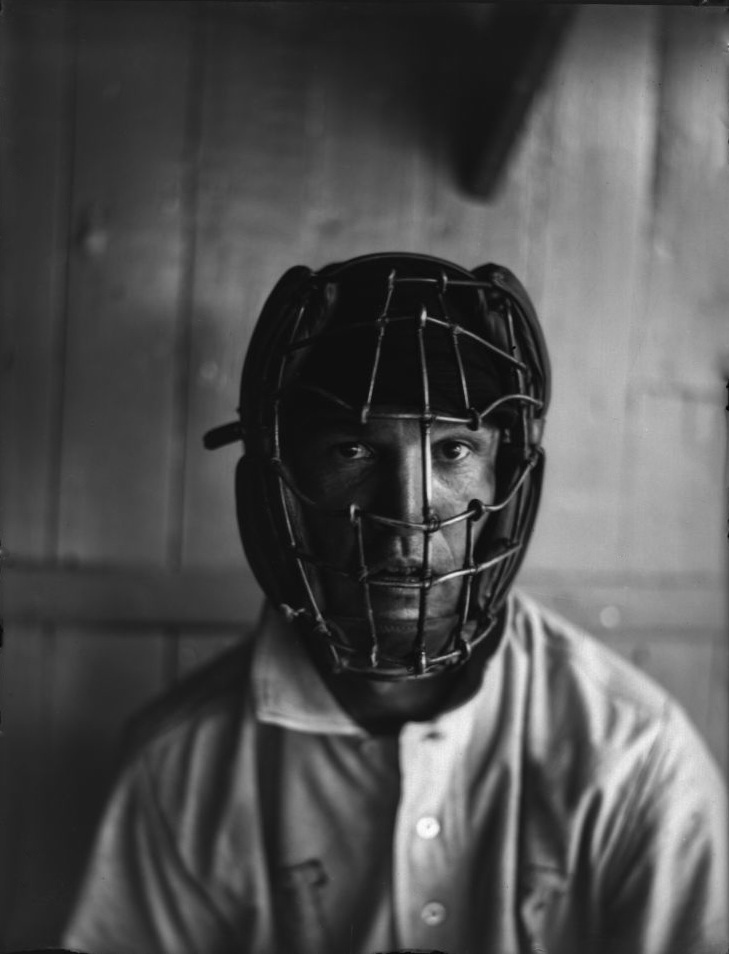
Vic Willis wearing an old-fashioned catcher's mask.

Additionally, some catchers choose to use the following optional equipment:

- Knee savers: Special pads filled with air or foam that attach to the straps of the shin guards, allowing cushion for the catcher when they are in the squatting position; they provide support for the knee ligaments which can, over time, stretch and tear.
- Inner protective glove: A glove, normally a batting glove, that is worn inside of the mitt to help absorb the shock of the pitched ball striking the hand.
- Throat protector: A hard-plastic plate which hangs from the bottom of the catcher's mask to protect the throat. Because a ball striking the throat may cave in the windpipe, throat protectors are required in almost all youth-baseball games, even at the high school level.
- Thumb guard: A hard plastic guard that forms around the thumb to prevent it from being broken from a pitch from the pitcher. The thumb guard is located on the inside of the glove (if worn) and is usually very helpful in protection.

In addition to their protective equipment, a catcher usually also adopts practices that minimize the risk of injury. For instance, unlike fielders elsewhere on the field, a catcher tries, to the extent possible, to catch the ball with their gloved hand alone. An outfielder may catch a fly ball by covering the ball, once it strikes the pocket of their glove, with their bare hand in order to secure it. The catcher, however, tries to keep their bare hand, which is highly vulnerable to injury, out of harm's way by presenting the pitcher with a target (the large round glove) while hiding their unprotected throwing hand behind their back or ankle. By doing so, the bare hand cannot be struck by a foul tip. Many broken fingers, split fingernails, and grotesque dislocations are avoided by adherence to this simple expedient.

Given the physical punishment suffered by catchers, the pieces of equipment associated with the position are often referred to as "the tools of ignorance". This is an ironic expression; the catcher typically has the most thorough understanding of baseball tactics and strategies of any player on a team.

Catchers often experience knee tendinitis because of the constant squatting and bending of the knees while catching.

== Hall of Fame catchers ==
As of 2024, twenty men who played primarily as catchers have been inducted into the National Baseball Hall of Fame, in Cooperstown, New York. They are:

- Johnny Bench
- Yogi Berra
- Roger Bresnahan
- Roy Campanella
- Gary Carter
- Mickey Cochrane
- Bill Dickey
- Buck Ewing
- Rick Ferrell
- Carlton Fisk
- Josh Gibson
- Gabby Hartnett
- Ernie Lombardi
- Biz Mackey
- Joe Mauer
- Mike Piazza
- Iván Rodríguez
- Louis Santop
- Ray Schalk
- Ted Simmons

Catchers are also represented in a number of other Baseball Halls of Fame around the world, such as in the Canadian Baseball Hall of Fame or the Japanese Baseball Hall of Fame.

== See also ==
- List of Gold Glove Award winners at catcher
- List of Silver Slugger Award winners at catcher

Other sports

- Wicketkeeper
