= Sign stealing =

Strategy in baseball

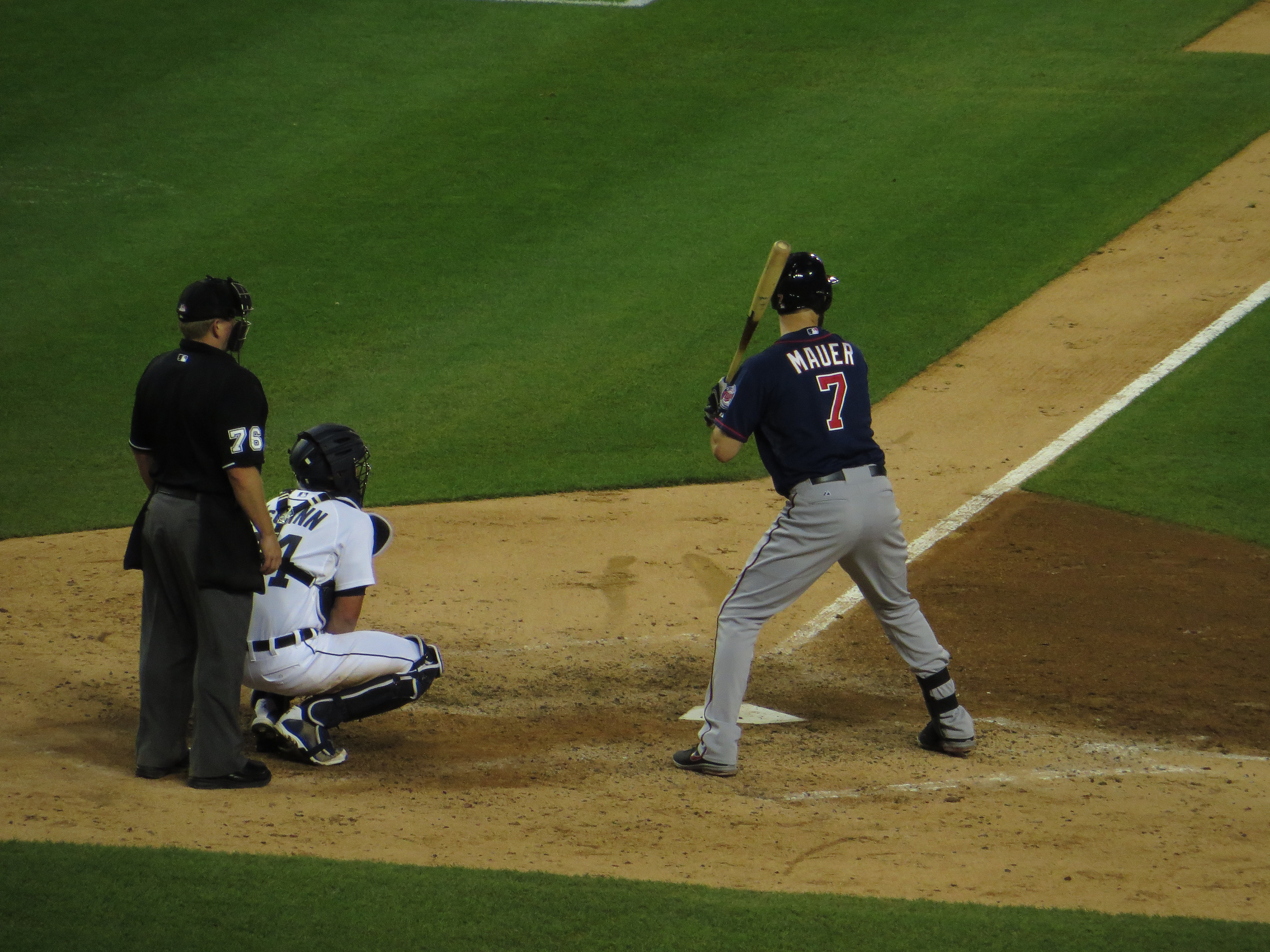
Catcher James McCann (in white uniform) of the Detroit Tigers using his right hand (obscured) to give signs to his pitcher, in a September 25, 2015 game against the Minnesota Twins; Joe Mauer is at bat.

In baseball, sign-stealing is the act of observing the signs being signaled by the opposing catcher to the pitcher or a coach, and the subsequent relaying of those signals to members of one's own team. Signs are stolen with the intent of gaining advance knowledge of the upcoming pitch and communicating it to the batter, thereby giving them an advantage. Legal sign stealing typically involves the signs being observed by a runner on second base and then relayed to the batter through some sort of gesture. Illegal sign-stealing involves mechanical or electronic technology; the rules regarding this have become more stringent over time and continue to evolve.

Sign-stealing has been in practice almost since the game's origin in the 19th century, and has continued to be used in recent times.

== Legality ==
According to the unwritten rules of baseball, stealing the signs that are given by the third base coach, or those of the catcher by a baserunner on second base, is acceptable, and it is up to the team giving the signs to protect them so they are not stolen. Even so, pitchers may retaliate when they believe their signs are being stolen with a brushback pitch. On the other hand, a batter peeking in to see the catcher's signs is not tolerated. Signs from catcher to pitcher are considered more "sacred" than signs from a third base coach to a batter.

Stealing signs is not necessarily a violation of Major League Baseball's (MLB) rulebook; it depends how the signs are stolen. At the December 1961 Winter Meetings, the National League banned the use of a "mechanical device" to steal signs. The use of electronic equipment is not specifically forbidden by MLB rules, but in 2001, Sandy Alderson, while serving as executive vice president for baseball operations of MLB, issued a memorandum stating that teams cannot use electronic equipment to communicate with each other during games, especially for the purpose of stealing signs. Before the 2019 season, in an effort to reduce illegal sign stealing, MLB commissioner Rob Manfred instituted specific prohibitions on where teams could position cameras and how instant replay officials can communicate with managers.

== Notable incidents ==
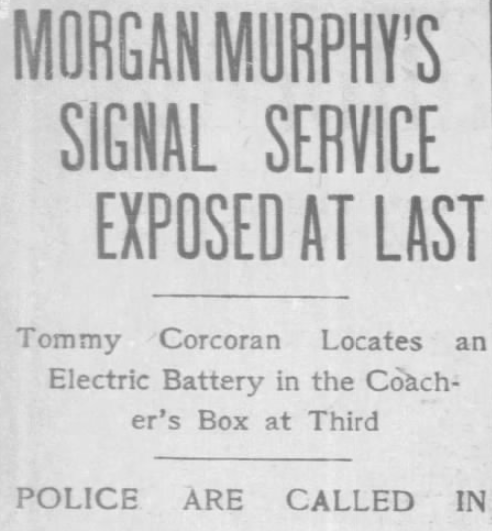
Newspaper headline from September 1900 about sign stealing by the Philadelphia Phillies

=== 19th century ===
The oldest recorded instance of a team attempting to steal signs dates back to 1876, when the Hartford Dark Blues hid a person in a shack to tip off their hitters when the pitcher would throw a curveball. In 1897, George Stallings, the manager of the Philadelphia Phillies, instructed backup catcher Morgan Murphy to hide in a clubhouse beyond center field with binoculars and a telegraph to alert Stallings to what pitch the opposing catcher was calling. In 1900, Murphy was again used to steal signs, relaying them to Phillies base coach Pearce Chiles, who stood on a buried box containing a wired buzzer. Murphy relayed coded messages to Chiles in the form of electrical buzzes about what pitch was coming, which Chiles communicated to batters by stomping on the ground. Murphy sent one buzz for a fastball, two buzzes for a curveball, and three buzzes for a changeup. During a game on September 17, 1900, the Cincinnati Reds discovered the buried electrical box used by Chiles. No action was taken against anyone involved in these early sign stealing incidents.

=== 20th century ===
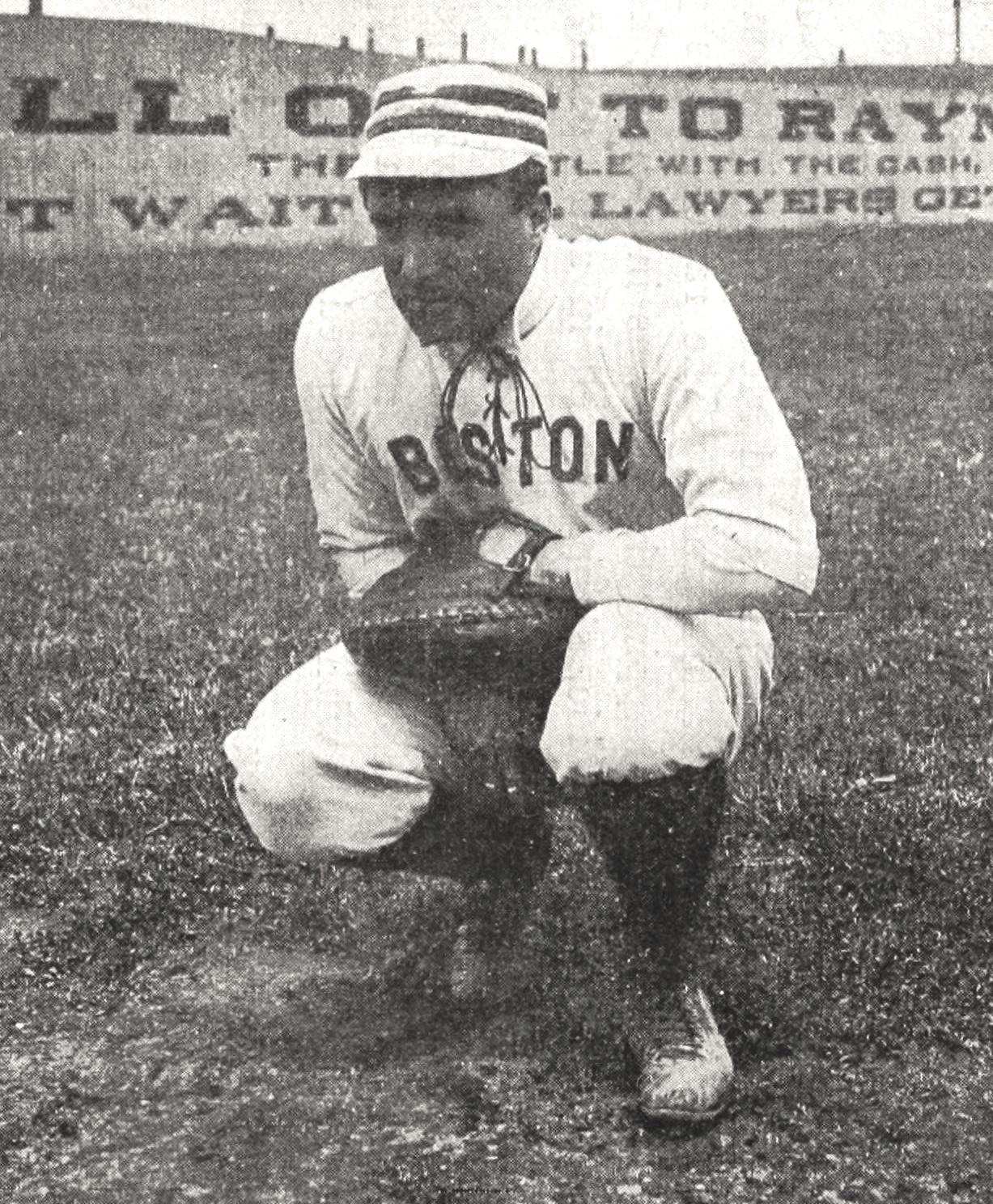
Catcher Malachi Kittridge of the Boston Beaneaters demonstrating how he gives signs, circa 1903.

In the 1903 baseball anthology How to Play Base Ball, compiled by Boston sportswriter Tim Murnane, catcher Malachi Kittridge of the Boston Beaneaters wrote: "I give my signs to the pitcher while in a squatting position to prevent the other side from calling the turn."

Three members of the 1951 New York Giants admitted to stealing signs by using a telescope to win the National League pennant that season—the admission came 50 years later, in 2001. The Giants rallied from 13 1/2 games behind in the final 10 weeks of the season to win the pennant over the Brooklyn Dodgers using this technique. Bobby Thomson, who hit the "Shot Heard 'Round the World", denied being tipped off to that pitch.

On May 26, 1959, despite the Milwaukee Braves' bullpen stealing catcher Smokey Burgess's signs, Pittsburgh Pirates pitcher Harvey Haddix threw 12 perfect innings before losing the game in the 13th. The only Braves player not to accept the signs was Hank Aaron.

In March 1962, newly acquired New York Mets pitcher Jay Hook accused his previous team, the 1961 National League champion Cincinnati Reds, of stealing signs throughout the season with help from former Reds pitcher Brooks Lawrence, stationed inside Crosley Field's scoreboard. Lawrence denied the charge, and Reds manager Fred Hutchinson, when asked if he would either confirm or deny the allegation, replied simply, "No. No comment." Forty years later, Hook's story was indirectly corroborated by another member of the 1961 Reds, pitcher-author Jim Brosnan, who discussed the disappointing home-field performance by Reds hitters during the 1961 World Series, despite having Lawrence "up in the left-centerfield scoreboard, stealing every sign the Yankee catchers gave."

=== 21st century ===
Technology has been a component in most recent sign stealing incidents.

==== 2017 Houston Astros scandal ====
After the 2019 season, Mike Fiers alleged that the 2017 Houston Astros used technology to steal their opponents' signs illegally and relay them to their hitters. MLB and the Astros opened an investigation into the allegation, and it was expanded to encompass the 2018 and 2019 seasons. On January 13, 2020, Rob Manfred announced that MLB's investigation confirmed that the Astros illegally used a video camera system to steal signs during their 2017 and 2018 seasons. The organization was penalized with a $5 million fine, forfeiture of first- and second-round draft picks in 2020 and 2021, and the suspension of general manager Jeff Luhnow and field manager A. J. Hinch for one year; later that day, the team fired Luhnow and Hinch. Three days after the Astros penalties were announced, the New York Mets and Carlos Beltrán (an Astros player at the time of the scandal) mutually parted ways. Beltrán had been hired as the team's new manager on November 1, 2019, so at the time of the announcement he had never managed a game for the team. Beltrán was the only player specifically named in MLB's report on the Astros scandal. While he was not directly linked to any prohibited activity, he was one of several Astros players who met during that season to discuss improvements in their sign stealing.

==== 2017 Boston Red Sox: Apple Watch ====
During the 2017 season, the Boston Red Sox were fined by MLB for using an Apple Watch to relay stolen signs to hitters in games against the New York Yankees. On September 15, 2017, commissioner Rob Manfred had said in regards to the investigation into Boston's illicit use of an Apple Watch: "I have received absolute assurances from the Red Sox that there will be no future violations of this type."

On February 4, 2020, MLB Network journalist Peter Gammons reported that former Red Sox player Chris Young told him that he was the mastermind of the Red Sox' Apple Watch scheme. Young told Gammons, "I started the whole Apple Watch thing. I got it from when I was with the Yankees." Young later denied this, and Gammons retracted his comments via Twitter. SportsNet New York (SNY) revealed that Young had been interviewed by MLB officials as part of the 2017 investigation against the Red Sox, and that multiple sources told the sports news agency that Young was in fact a leader of the team's 2017 Apple Watch scheme.

MLB fined the Yankees after their pitching coach, Larry Rothschild, made a phone call to replay room officials to ask whether a particular pitch was a ball or a strike. A 2017 letter from commissioner Manfred to Yankees general manager Brian Cashman, made public in 2022, indicated the Yankees were fined $100,000 for sign stealing.

==== 2018 Boston Red Sox: video replay ====
On January 7, 2020, the Red Sox were implicated in another sign stealing scandal after three unnamed team members told The Athletic that the Red Sox had used their replay room to steal signs of opposing teams during the 2018 season. On January 13, 2020, Manfred stated that he would determine the appropriate punishment for Red Sox manager Alex Cora, who was also implicated in the Astros scandal, when the investigation was completed. The next day, Cora and the Red Sox mutually agreed to part ways; Dave Dombrowski, the general manager who hired Cora, was dismissed from the Red Sox before the 2018 sign stealing scandal was made public.

On April 22, 2020, Commissioner Manfred issued his report from the investigation, determining that the Red Sox replay operator had "utilized the game feeds in the replay room" to decode sign sequences but those actions were "limited in scope and impact", as the decoding only happened during some occurrences of the opposing team having a runner on second base and were not known to "then-Manager Alex Cora, the Red Sox coaching staff, the Red Sox front office, or most of the players". The video replay operator was suspended for the 2020 season and the team forfeited their second-round selection in the 2020 MLB draft. Cora was separately suspended for a year for his actions in the Houston Astros sign stealing scandal.

==== Reactions to sign stealing ====
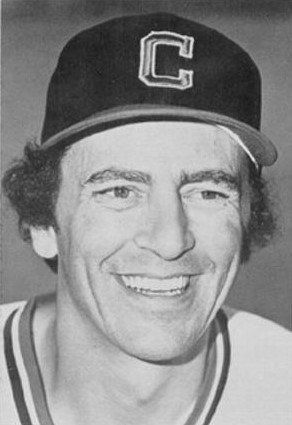
Joe Nossek, who served as an MLB coach for 28 seasons, was considered a "sign-stealing guru".

Former MLB executive David Samson and Fox Sports Radio's Jonas Knox have said they believe this type of cheating is widespread throughout the sport. Some pitchers intentionally balked when runners were on second base to try and negate the risk of sign-stealing.

Prior to the 2022 MLB season, the league announced that teams could use PitchCom, a wireless communication system that allows the catcher to request pitches without using visible signals.

== Notable sign stealers ==
Many players and coaches throughout baseball history have been considered adept at sign stealing. These include Del Baker, Joey Amalfitano, and Joe Nossek.

Pitcher Al Worthington had a religious objection to sign stealing, and quit both the 1959 Giants and the 1960 White Sox because of the teams' sign stealing.

Manager Whitey Herzog was known to complain about other teams stealing signs. After a game where the Brewers were found to be sign stealing using their mascot Bernie Brewer, he reportedly said, "Maybe we should put a Texas Ranger or somebody out there and shoot a gun or something when a curveball is coming," referring to the incident.

== See also ==
- Cheating in baseball
- Gamesmanship
- University of Michigan football sign-stealing scandal
