= PitchCom =

Wireless communication system

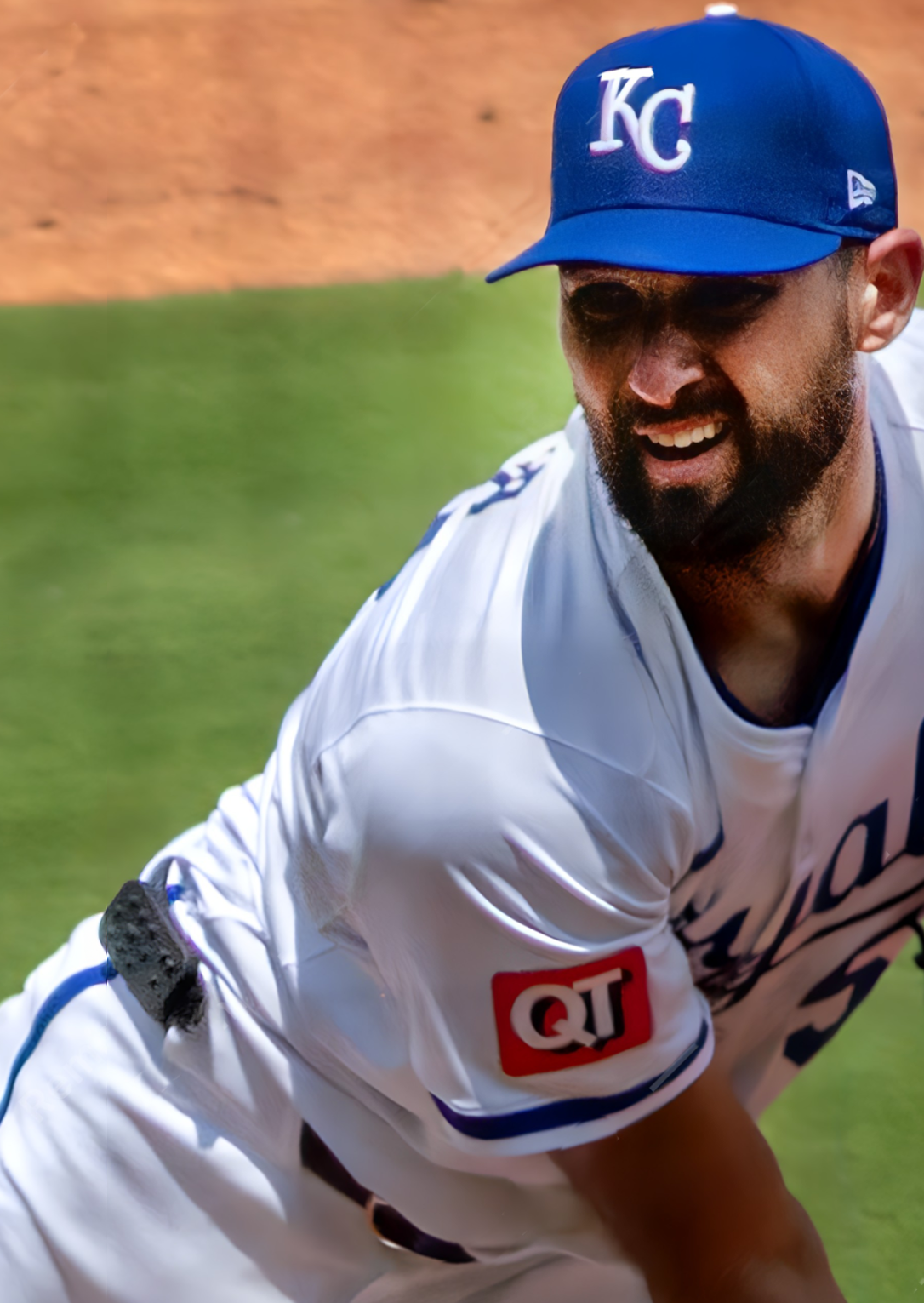
Michael Wacha of the Kansas City Royals wearing a PitchCom keypad on his waist

PitchCom is a wireless communication system used in baseball that lets a player request pitches without using visible signals. Major League Baseball (MLB) approved the use of PitchCom before the start of the 2022 season with the intentions of deterring sign stealing and quickening the pace of play.

== History ==
Catchers traditionally request pitches with finger signs, but these can be stolen by a runner on second base and relayed to the batter. When a runner reaches second base, the catcher commonly visits the pitcher to change signs, delaying the game.

The technology used in PitchCom was invented by John Hankins and Craig Filcetti to silently cue magic tricks for performing illusionists and their assistants. Their company asked MLB to consider adopting the technology in 2020. During the 2021 Low-A West season, teams were permitted to try PitchCom. The technology was optional but strongly encouraged, according to a memo sent by the league. After generally positive results in the minor league, and in spring training before the 2022 MLB season, the MLB Players Association approved use of PitchCom for the 2022 season.

During spring training before the 2023 MLB season, MLB allowed pitchers to wear PitchCom wristbands so they could call their own pitches. As spring training ended, MLB allowed pitchers to request pitches on PitchCom during the 2023 regular season. MLB also clarified its rules, stating that in the event of a PitchCom malfunction, a pitcher or catcher must immediately notify an umpire, who would grant a timeout if the player is not attempting to circumvent pace of play rules.

The KBO League began using PitchCom in July 2024.

== Operation ==
PitchCom has two functional components: a nine-button keypad that the catcher wears and small wireless receivers, with speakers, that the catcher, the pitcher, and up to three other fielders may wear inside their baseball caps. Each receiver can be programmed to a particular spoken language. When the catcher presses buttons to indicate the type of pitch and the desired location, all receivers speak the instructions in the selected language. All communications are encrypted, and teams may opt to replace pitch names such as "fastball" with code words.

During its first season of use in MLB, some players had problems using PitchCom. Early in the 2022 season, New York Yankees pitcher Aroldis Chapman had difficulty hearing PitchCom over the crowd during an appearance at Oriole Park at Camden Yards. "We just might have to turn up our volume a little bit," said Jose Trevino, the Yankees' catcher. Gerrit Cole, another Yankees pitcher, had trouble hearing pitch instructions in his first two starts, including an incident where the instructions were drowned out by a siren sound effect that the Yankee Stadium audio crew plays to energize the crowd. During a game on June 30 against the Houston Astros, Yankees pitcher Luis Severino was trying to fix his malfunctioning PitchCom device when Kyle Tucker, on third base, tried to steal home. Severino, despite the distraction, threw out Tucker at home. On Opening Day, Milwaukee Brewers pitcher Corbin Burnes had problems hearing his PitchCom speaker over the crowd noise at American Family Field.

During the 2022 season, in response to complaints, PitchCom was modified to have a higher volume limit and to have an extension tube that put sound closer to the player's ear. Even at the higher maximum volume, during the 2022 MLB postseason, Philadelphia Phillies shortstop Bryson Stott struggled to hear the audio over the crowd noise. During a spring training exhibition at Tropicana Field before the 2023 season, umpires informed Minnesota Twins manager Rocco Baldelli that umpires and Tampa Bay Rays batters could clearly hear PitchCom signals because Twins catcher Tony Wolters had his speaker volume turned up to an excessively high level, which was not helped by the indoor stadium's low attendance of 2,531, which without steady crowd noise, effectively allowed those signals to be amplified.

== Reception ==
Despite early problems, all 30 MLB clubs started to use PitchCom in some way during the 2022 season. Detroit Tigers catcher Tucker Barnhart said that the technology would make the Tigers ready for the pitch clock when MLB starts to use it. Cleveland Guardians manager Terry Francona and catcher Austin Hedges said that the system sped up games noticeably. Yankees manager Aaron Boone credited PitchCom with significantly shortening Yankees games in 2022. Through their first 54 games in 2022, the Yankees played 25 games (almost half) in less than three hours each. In 2021, only about one quarter of the Yankees' games finished in three hours or less. Across the majors, the average time of a nine-inning game in 2022 decreased by six minutes from the prior season, which ESPN credited in part to PitchCom.

New York Mets pitcher Max Scherzer used PitchCom for the first time on July 27, 2022. He praised PitchCom's functionality, but he told reporters that "it should be illegal", saying that it removes incentives for pitchers to create complex visual sign systems that runners are challenged to decode. "It works," he said, "but it's taking away a part of the game." Scherzer's comments drew rebuttals from Seattle Mariners relief pitcher Paul Sewald, who called them "a little naïve" and "a bit hypocritical", and from Minnesota Twins starter Sonny Gray, who said that teams were able to break down sign sequences during a game.

== Photos ==
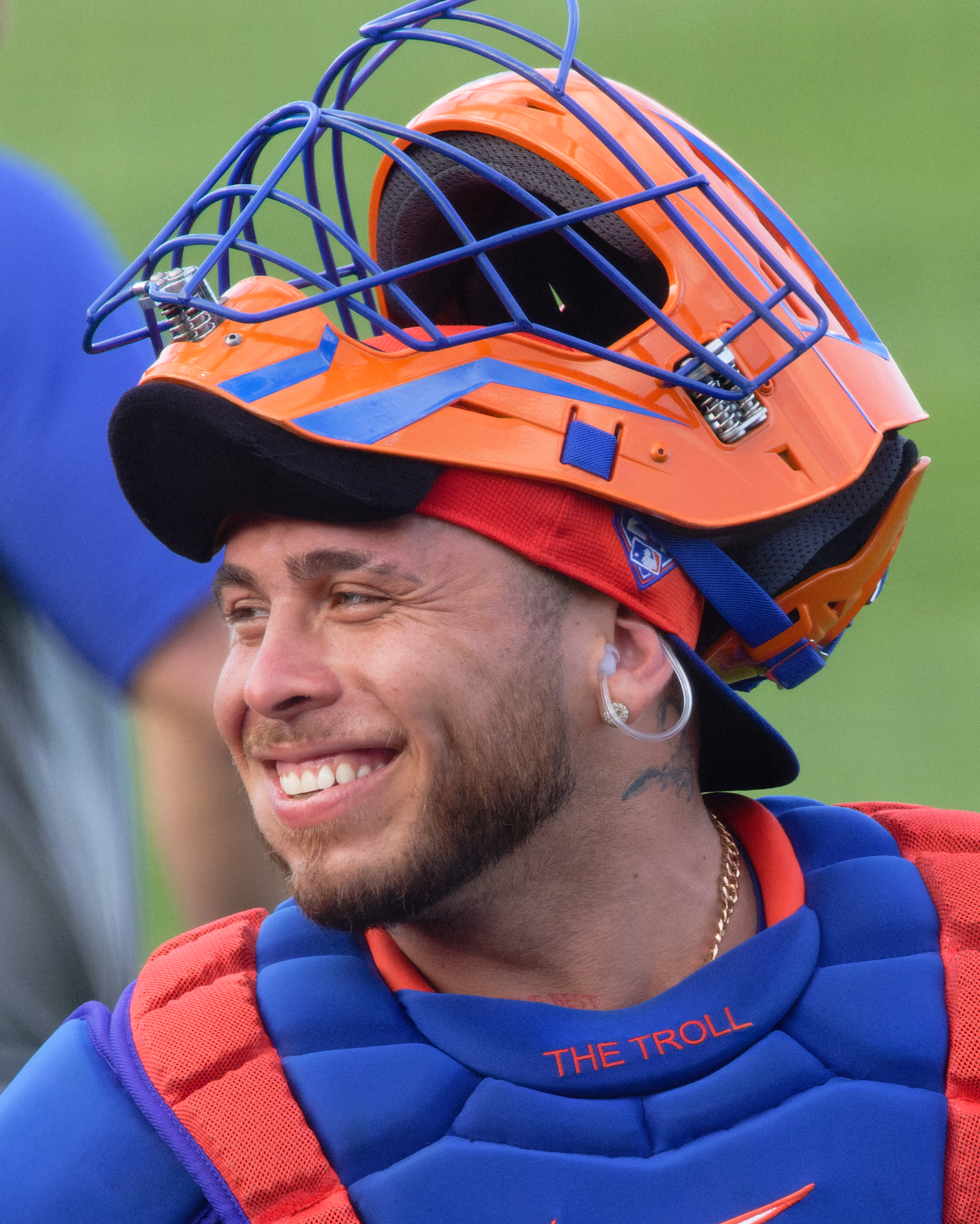
Francisco Álvarez of the New York Mets with a PitchCom extension tube/earpiece in his ear

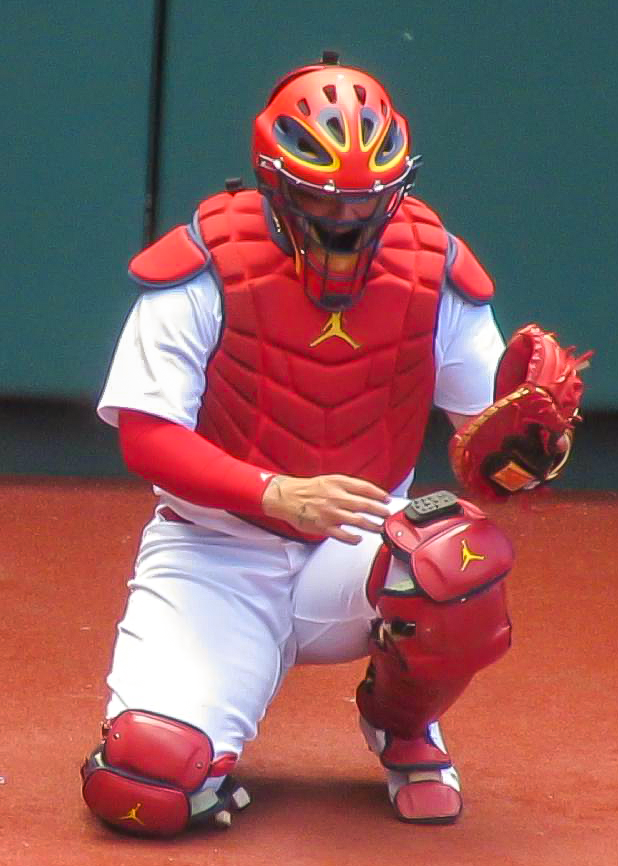
Yadier Molina using a PitchCom keypad on his knee
