= Bullpen car =

Car used in professional baseball

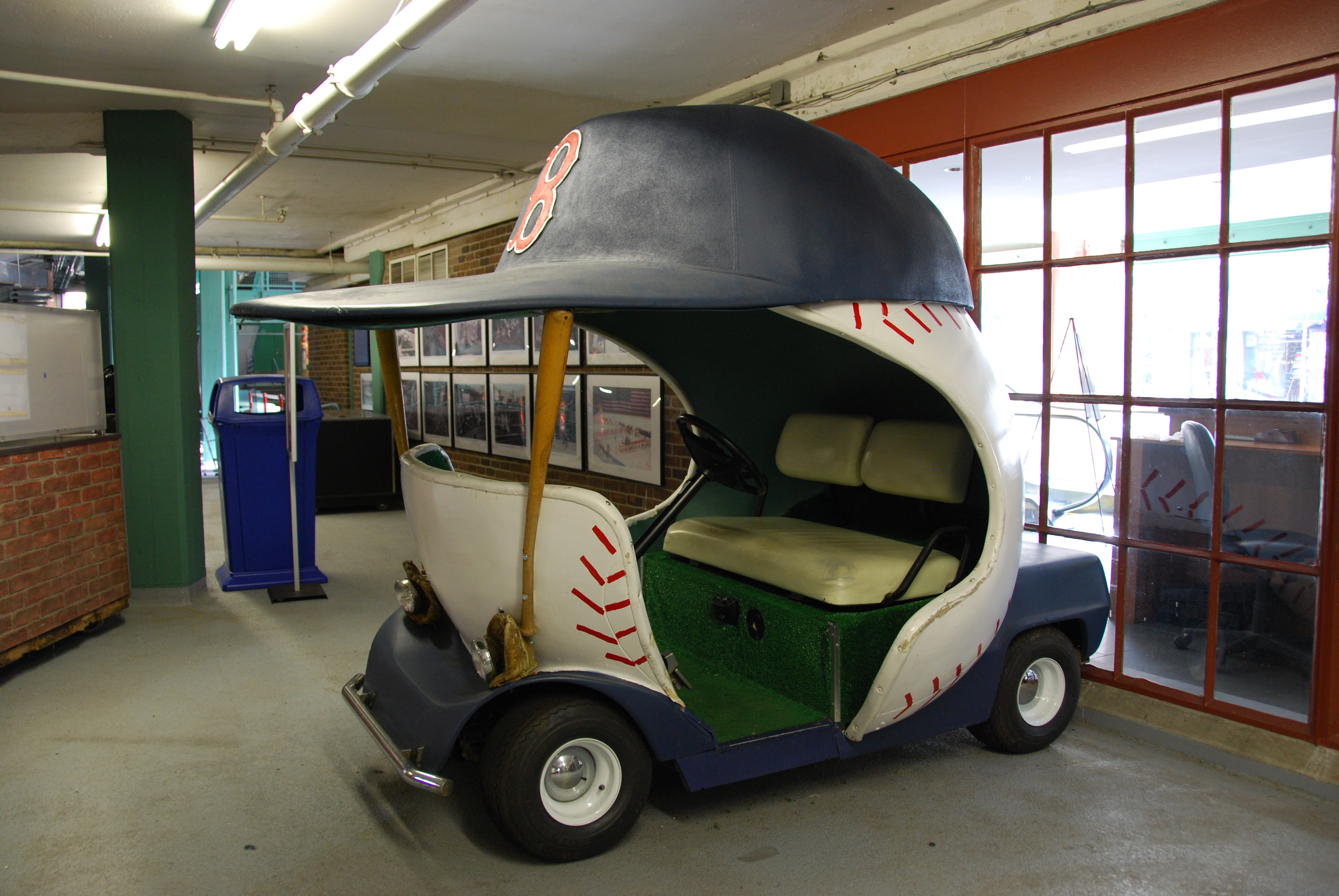
The bullpen car of the Boston Red Sox

The bullpen car, also known as a bullpen cart, is a motor vehicle used in professional baseball to bring relief pitchers into the game from the bullpen to the pitcher's mound during a pitching change. Bullpen cars were used in Major League Baseball from 1950 through 1995, and returned to use in 2018. They have also been used in Nippon Professional Baseball since the 1980s.

== History ==
The first bullpen car introduced in Major League Baseball (MLB) was "a little red auto" used by the Cleveland Indians in 1950 at the large Cleveland Municipal Stadium. The Chicago White Sox followed suit in 1951, becoming the first team to transport the pitcher from the bullpen all the way to the pitcher's mound. The White Sox discontinued the practice in 1955 after fans continued throwing garbage at the car. In 1959, the Milwaukee Braves began to use a (locally-produced) Harley-Davidson Topper with a sidecar as a bullpen car.

In 1963, the Los Angeles Angels became the first team to use a golf cart as their bullpen car. The New York Mets introduced a bullpen car based on a golf cart with an oversized team hat in 1967. The New York Yankees began using a Datsun 1200 painted with pinstripes in 1972. Rats chewed through the Datsun's cables, and the team switched to a Toyota Celica in 1982. The White Sox introduced a bullpen car built off of a Chrysler LeBaron in 1981, but it was also unpopular with pitchers, who refused to ride in it, and fans, who threw garbage at it.

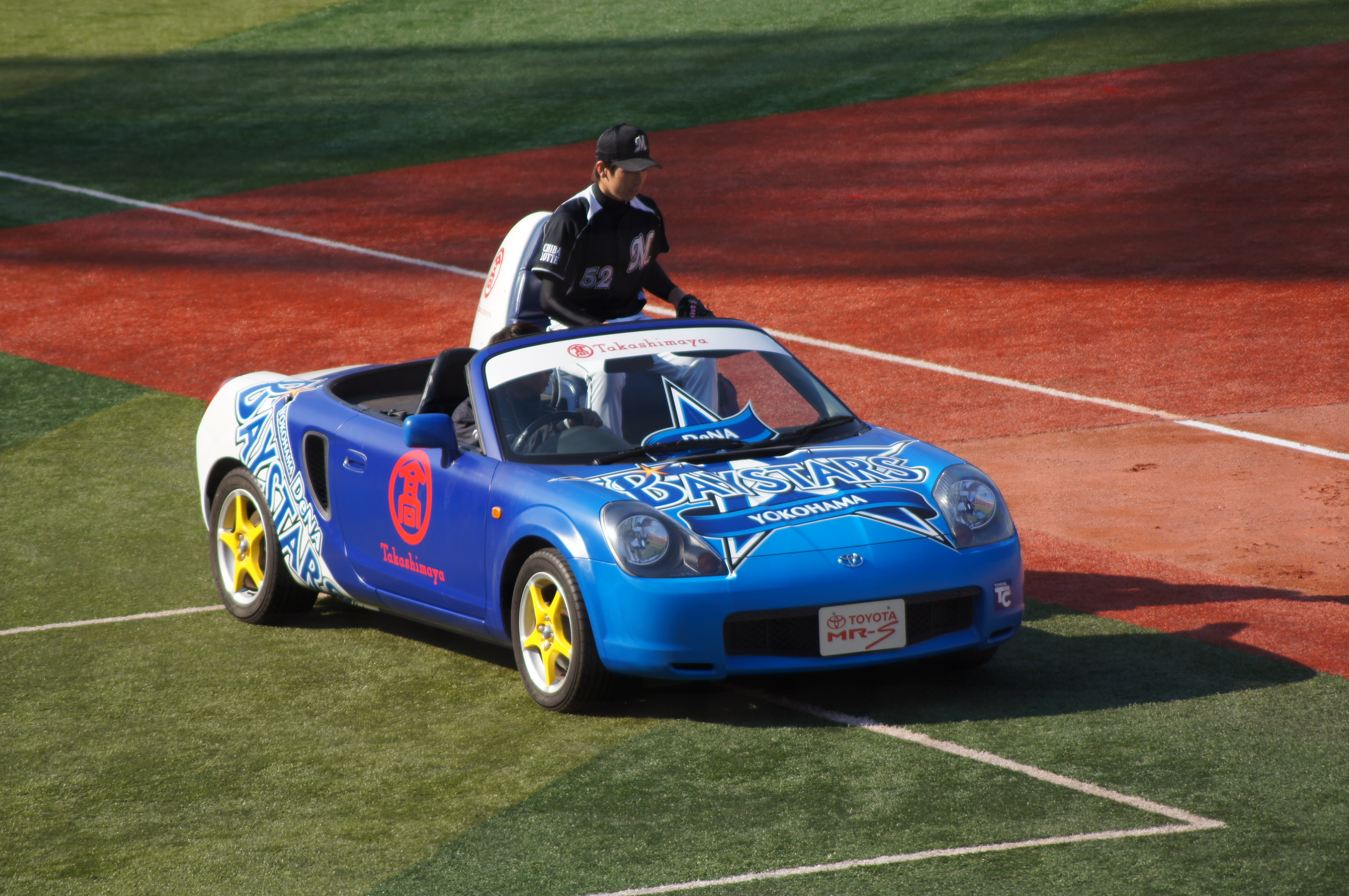
Naoya Masuda riding in a Toyota MR-S bullpen car

The Seattle Mariners began using a version designed to look like a tugboat in 1982, called the M.S. Relief. On Opening Day of the 1982 season, the Mariners' Bill Caudill hid the keys to the bullpen car, causing a delay in the start of the game. Caudill organized a boycott of the tugboat, saying that it "should be fined as an embarrassment to the team". No Mariners player ever rode in the tugboat, and it was removed from use less than a week later.

Pitchers disliked the bullpen cars, leading to them being phased out. The last MLB team to use a bullpen car prior to its reintroduction in 2018 was Milwaukee, which phased out their motorcycle (which was also produced by Harley-Davidson) in 1995.

The bullpen car remained in use in Japanese baseball. Most of them are convertibles so that fans can see the players inside, including many one-offs provided to the teams by the manufacturer. In the 1980s, the Yokohama DeNA BayStars of Nippon Professional Baseball introduced a bullpen car, a one-off Datsun Bluebird (910) convertible. It was the first of a few bullpen cars provided by Nissan to their hometown team. It would be followed by a Be-1 and S-Cargo in the 1990s. In 2017, the BayStars began using the Nissan Leaf, while Yasuaki Yamasaki used a Toyota MR-S to enter games. The Tokyo Yakult Swallows also use a custom Nissan, a one-off Y34 Cedric roadster. The Hanshin Tigers currently use a modified smart fortwo convertible.

In KBO League in South Korea, the Kia Tigers has used white Kia vehicles as their bullpen cars since they were introduced at Gwangju-Kia Champions Field in 2014. In the 2020s, they have used vehicles such as the Kia EV9 and Kia Tasman. The Hanwha Eagles used the Porsche Taycan as a bullpen car in the 2024 season.

The Sugar Land Space Cowboys of the Atlantic League of Professional Baseball, an independent baseball league, introduced a bullpen car in 2012.

With an increasing focus on speeding up the pace of play of MLB games, MLB had a committee discuss bringing back the bullpen car in 2015. The Arizona Diamondbacks announced they would introduce their first bullpen car prior to the 2018 season. While the car was available on Opening Day, March 29, 2018, the first reliever to make use of it was Collin McHugh on May 5, 2018, for a sixth-inning relief role in the Diamondbacks' 18th home game of the season. The Detroit Tigers were the second team to introduce a bullpen car, on April 13, 2018, and the Washington Nationals became the third team to introduce one, on August 17, 2018. A bullpen car designed to look like a baseball glove was used during the 2020 Summer Olympics.
