= Bob DuPuy =

American lawyer and former MLB president

Robert A. DuPuy
- Born: 1947 (age 78–79)
- Education: Dartmouth College (A.B.); Cornell Law School (J.D.)
- Occupation: Lawyer
- Known for: Former President/COO of Major League Baseball

Robert A. DuPuy (born c. 1947) is a lawyer and former president and chief operating officer of Major League Baseball (MLB). He assumed both titles on March 7, 2002. Prior to joining Major League Baseball in 1998, he was a partner and management committee member of Foley & Lardner, a large Milwaukee-based law firm. He returned to Foley & Lardner in 2010 as a partner with the firm's Sports Industry Team.

== Biography ==
DuPuy grew up in Branford, Connecticut. He graduated from Notre Dame High School in West Haven, Connecticut, in 1964. DuPuy received a Bachelor of Arts from Dartmouth College, in 1968, and a Juris Doctor from Cornell Law School, in 1973. At Cornell, he was the editor-in-chief of the Cornell Law Review. After attending Dartmouth, he served in the Vietnam War with the 504th Military Police Battalion of the United States Army where he received the Army Commendation Medal.

On November 3, 2007, at Yale Commons in New Haven, Connecticut, DuPuy was bestowed with the honor of becoming a Knight of Honor, the highest award the school gives to graduates and friends of Notre Dame High School.

DuPuy has taught legal ethics and professional responsibility at Cornell University, Northwestern Law School, the University of Wisconsin Law School, and Marquette University Law School, and has served as a long-time faculty member of the National Institute of Trial Advocacy. DuPuy was "AV® Preeminent™", the highest performance rating in Martindale-Hubbell's peer review rating system.

DuPuy left MLB in the fall of 2010 after 8½ years as the commissioner's top aide. During his twelve years at MLB, he led the formation of Major League Baseball Advanced Media, which includes MLB's website. He agreed to commissioner Bud Selig's request that he continue to work on various MLB special projects.

== See also ==
- Major League Baseball#Organizational structure
- Commissioner of Baseball (MLB)
