= Pitch clock =

Clock used in baseball to speed play

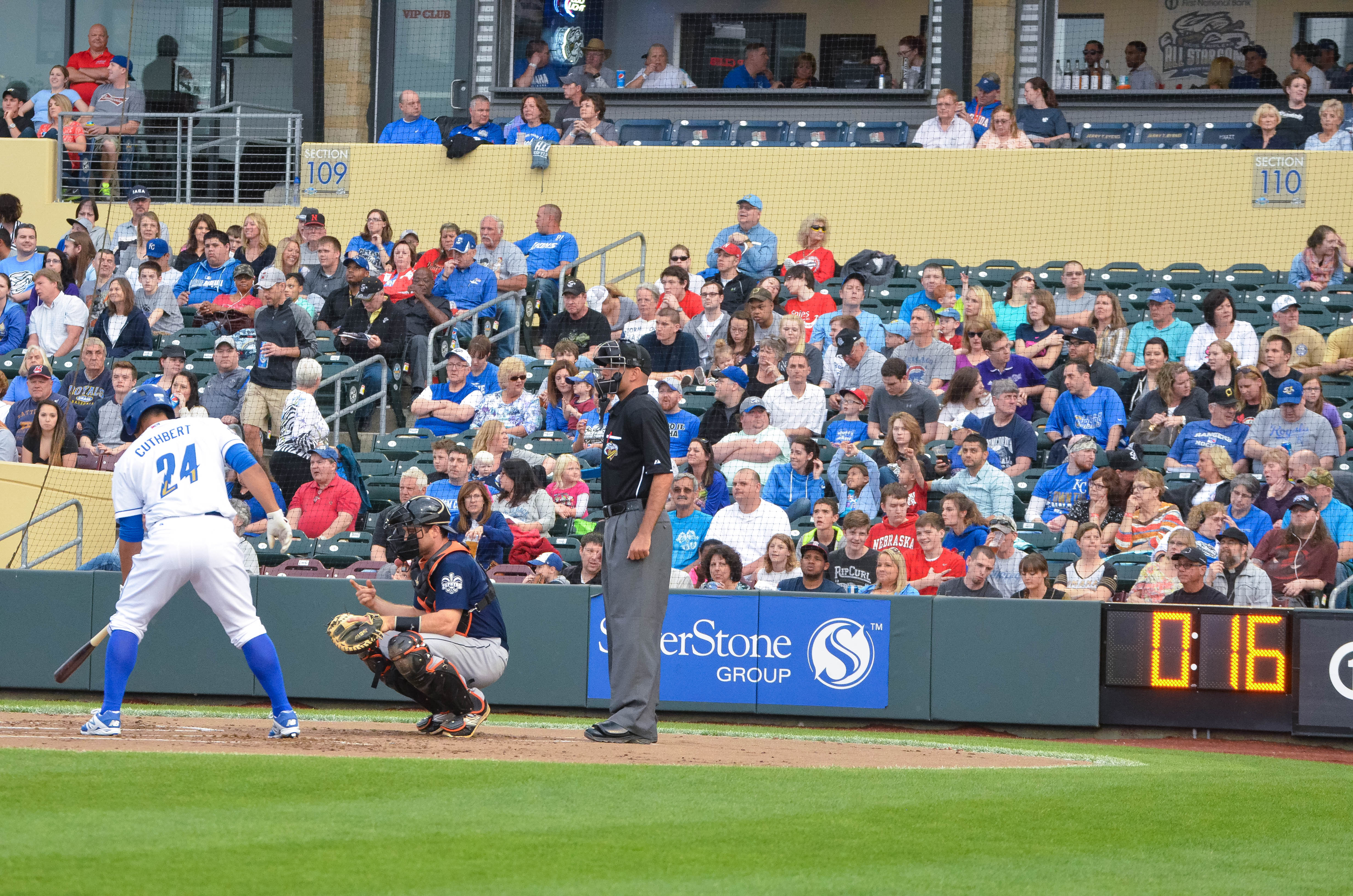
A pitch clock displayed at Werner Park in 2015

A pitch clock (also known as a pitch timer) is used in various baseball leagues to limit the amount of time a pitcher takes before throwing a pitch and/or limit the amount of time the hitter uses before they are set to hit.

Various baseball leagues and tournaments around the world use a pitch clock to speed up the pace of play. Major League Baseball (MLB) began using a pitch clock in the 2023 season following a period of tests on MLB partner leagues, minor league baseball, and college baseball.

== History ==
In 1962, Hap Dumont, head of the semi-pro National Baseball Congress, commissioned the Timex Corporation to build a clock to install in the scoreboard at Lawrence Stadium in Wichita, Kansas for the NBC National Tournament, with a 20 second pitch clock and 90 seconds between innings. The clock buzzed when the timer went off, with a ball called if the pitcher violated and a strike if the batter violated the timer. In 1965, Dumont predicted Major League Baseball would use the NBC electronic timer in two years. The timer has been used for the NBC World Series in Wichita ever since.

In professional baseball, Pacific Coast League President Dewey Soriano ordered PCL umpires to enforce the 20 second pitch timer listed in the rulebook in 1962. Two teams in the PCL, the Spokane Indians and Portland Beavers, installed pitch clocks in their stadiums to varying levels of success, with umpires not always calling balls after violations. In 1963, the Texas League implemented pitch clocks league wide, but were discontinued before the 1965 season. The Midwest League’s Quad City Angels saw the most success with their pitch clock, installing it in 1963 and using it at least through the 1969 season.

In college baseball, the Southeastern Conference experimented with using pitch clocks in 2010. Pitchers were given twenty seconds to throw the pitch, or a ball would be added to the count. Similarly, a batter stepping out of the batter's box with less than five seconds on the clock was assessed an additional strike. After the 2010 season, the National Collegiate Athletic Association sought to make the pitch clock mandatory, and instituted it for the 2011 college baseball season, but only when there are no runners on base.

The first professional league to use pitch clocks was the Arizona Fall League, starting in 2014. On January 15, 2015, Major League Baseball (MLB) announced it would institute a 20-second pitch clock in Minor League Baseball for Double-A and Triple-A teams during the 2015 season. Pitchers were allowed 20 seconds to throw a pitch, with the penalty of a ball awarded to the batter if not followed. Along with other rules affecting the pace of play, the clock contributed to a 12-minute reduction in game times between the 2014 and 2015 seasons, compared to the leagues that did not use the clock, which saw game times change from an increase of three minutes per game to a decrease in five minutes per game. Game times increased in 2016 and 2017, but were still faster than games in 2014. The independent Atlantic League began using a 12-second pitch clock.

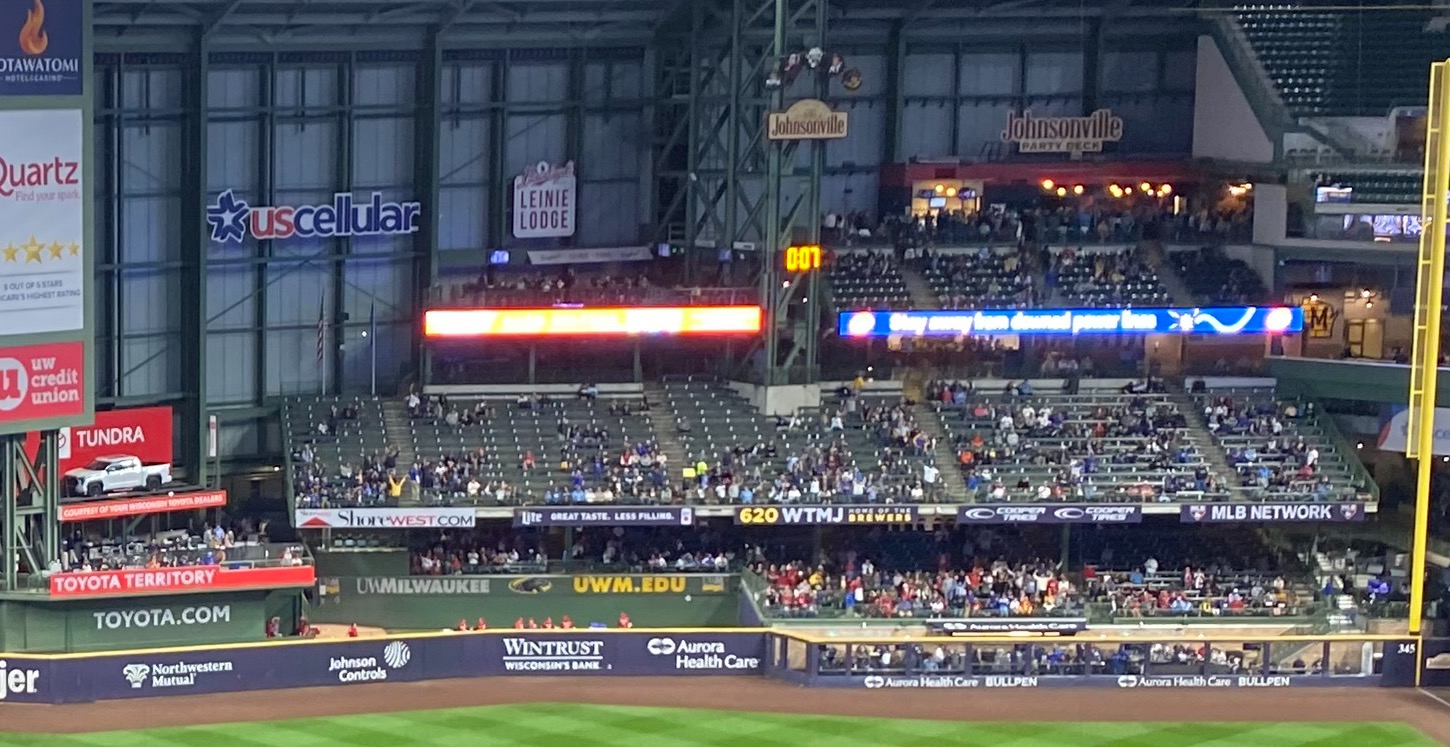
The outfield pitch clock at American Family Field is seen in the center of the image on the pillar in September 2022; here, it indicates that seven seconds remain in a television timeout between innings.

=== Major League Baseball ===
The 1901 season saw the implementation of a predecessor to the modern-day pitch clock. When no runners were on base, a one-ball penalty would be imposed if the pitcher did not deliver a pitch within 20 seconds of the batter taking his stance at the plate. The rules were tightened before the start of the 1955 season, and the 20-second timer started once the pitcher received the ball. However, these 20-second limits were hardly ever enforced, and were left to the umpire's judgement.

MLB and the MLB Players Association (MLBPA) discussed the possibility of introducing the pitch clock in the major leagues for the 2018 season. MLB opted against imposing it unilaterally, over the opposition of the MLBPA. MLB implemented a 20-second pitch clock in spring training games in 2019. The collective bargaining agreement reached to end the 2021–22 Major League Baseball lockout included the possibility of introducing a pitch clock for the 2023 MLB season. Four active players plus six persons appointed by MLB and one umpire formed a Joint Competition Committee to review and recommend any changes to playing rules.

On September 8, 2022, MLB announced that rules changes for 2023 included the use of a pitch clock. Pitchers would have 15 seconds between pitches when there are no baserunners and 20 seconds if there is at least one baserunner. Also, the batter will have 7 to 12 seconds to be in the stance ready to hit, or an automatic strike will be called. The clock starts when the pitcher gets the ball and the catcher and batter are ready.

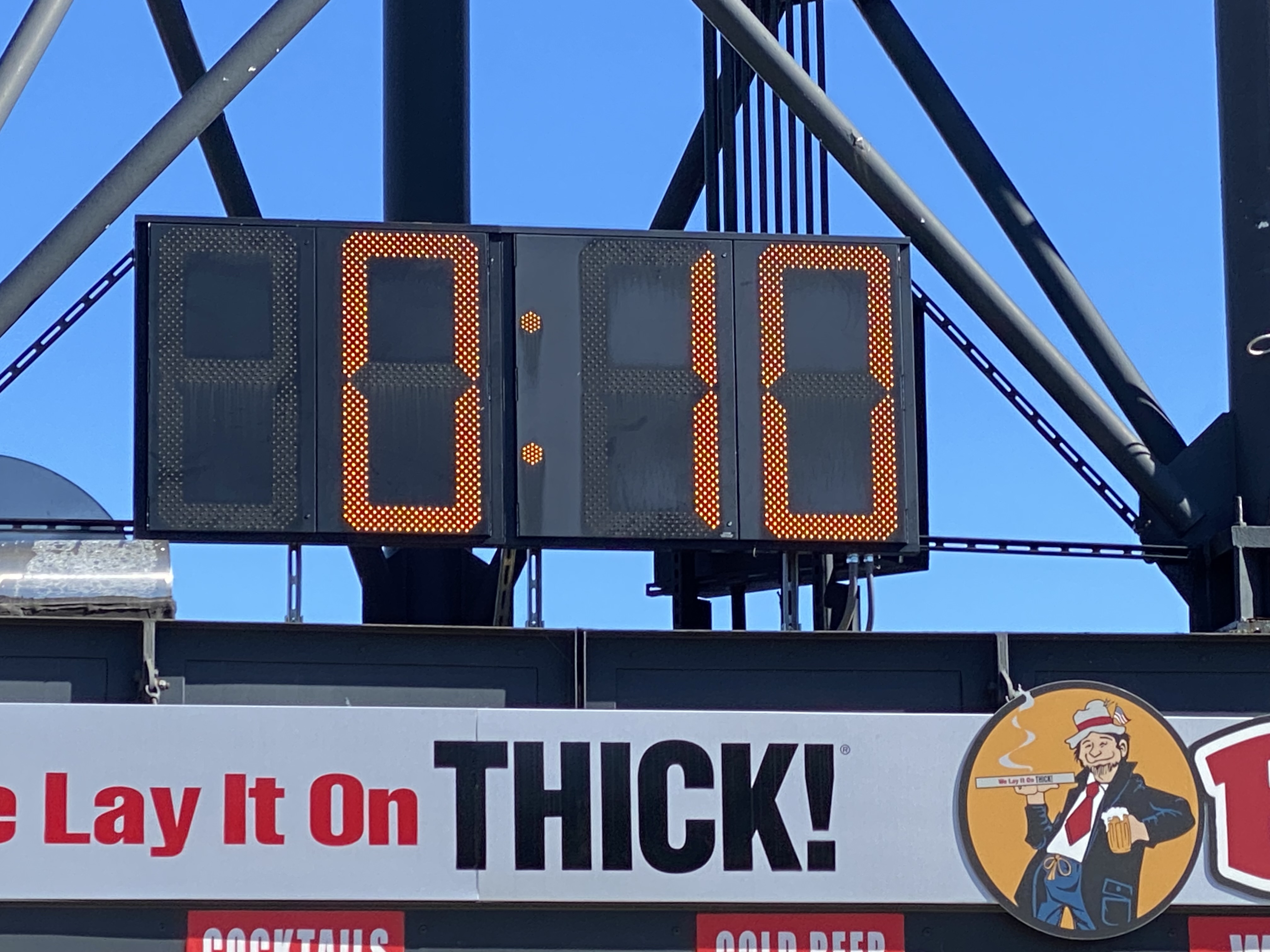
The centerfield pitch clock at Chicago's Rate Field, which is installed to the bottom left of the Chicago White Sox's signature 'exploding scoreboard'. Its positioning places it in direct view of the batter, catcher, and home plate umpire and is required to be placed outside the batter's eye.

In addition to its primary use to time pitches, the clock indicates the time remaining in a television timeout for commercials (usually between each half of an inning), and also to time the warmup period on the mound for a relief pitcher coming out of the bullpen. There are multiple iterations and pitch clock units displayed throughout a major league stadium to allow its full visibility for players, coaches, umpires, press, and spectators throughout the venue, with each synchronized to keep in exact time, which is controlled by a field time coordinator who has direct communication with the umpires, who arbitrate and can overrule them in certain circumstances. The system is also tied into by the production trucks of the game broadcasters, allowing them to display the pitch timer within the score bug, which as a backup can use a camera focused on the physical field timer if that system runs into technical issues.

Marcus Stroman of the Chicago Cubs became the first pitcher to violate the pitch clock during the regular season, during the third inning of the 2023 opening day game against the Milwaukee Brewers. The Baltimore Orioles' Austin Hays was the first batter to receive a strike call due to a time infraction, while Rafael Devers of the Boston Red Sox was the first to be called for a strikeout.

The first 400 Major League Baseball games during the 2023 season were, on average, about 30 minutes shorter than the first 400 of the previous season. In addition, the standard deviation of game times was down significantly. The game length had not been this consistent since the 1942 season. MLB postseason games in the first year of the pitch clock were 21 minutes shorter on average than postseason games in the previous year, with more runs and stolen bases.

In December 2023 the MLB competition committee approved a rule change to reduce the pitch clock from 20 to 18 seconds with runners on base, beginning in the 2024 season.

In the 2023 season, the first to use the rule, there were 1,048 violations: 747 by pitchers, 286 by hitters, and 15 by catchers. In the 2024 season there were significantly fewer: 602 total; 465 by pitchers, 133 by batters and 4 by catchers. The Houston Astros led MLB teams with 35 pitch clock violations and the Washington Nationals' Kyle Finnegan led individuals with 11.

=== Other leagues ===
The Japan Amateur Baseball Association (part of the Baseball Federation of Japan) which organizes most Japanese adult baseball outside Nippon Professional Baseball and its minor league teams, decided to adopt the pitch clock after MLB's success in 2023 Spring Training.

KBO League introduced the pitch clock system in the 2025 season.

== Pitch clock and injuries ==
Data regarding the effect of the pitch clock on injuries is limited. A 2024 study concluded that the rate of injuries decreased significantly after the MLB pitch clock was introduced in 2023. The authors noted that the 2023 season saw a statistically significant decrease in total injuries, undisclosed injuries and torso injuries, but that there was no statistically significant difference in the number of elbow injuries suffered by pitchers compared to the 2021 or 2022 seasons.

== See also ==
- Play clock – Countdown clock in gridiron football
- Shot clock – Clock used for pace of play in sports
- Over rate – Cricket statistic
