= Friday Night Baseball =

Weekly MLB broadcast on Apple TV

- Genre: American baseball game telecasts
- Presented by: Various commentators
- Country of origin: United States
- Original language: English
- No. of seasons: 5 (through 2026 season)

Production
- Production locations: Various MLB stadiums (game telecasts)
- Camera setup: Multi-camera
- Running time: 210 minutes or until game ends (inc. adverts)
- Production companies: Major League Baseball; MLB Network

Original release
- Network: Apple TV+
- Release: April 8, 2022 – October 10, 2025
- Network: Apple TV
- Release: October 17, 2025 – present

Friday Night Baseball is a live broadcast of Major League Baseball (MLB) games on Apple TV, which debuted during the league's 2022 season. The weekly broadcast is produced by MLB Network, featuring a doubleheader with pregame and postgame analysis. The broadcast is available in United States, Canada and Mexico, as well as select overseas markets including Australia, Brazil, Japan, South Korea, Puerto Rico and the United Kingdom, with plans to expand availability of the broadcast to more regions in the future.

== History ==
In March 2022, Apple Inc. signed a seven-year deal with MLB for the broadcast for US$85 million per year, a total value of $595 million. This includes an annual $55 million rights fee as well as $30 million for Apple advertising. Apple has the right to exit the agreement after the first or second year. The deal was the first sports broadcasting contract ever acquired by Apple. Plans for the broadcast were formally announced on March 8, 2022, at Apple's Peek Performance event and later in an online press release.

The first broadcast date was initially made uncertain as the deal was signed amidst the 2021–22 MLB lockout and the threat of cancelled games. After the lockout was resolved, MLB announced that the first games would air on April 8, 2022, with a doubleheader of New York Mets–Washington Nationals and Houston Astros–Los Angeles Angels as the inaugural matchups. Apple also announced that Friday Night Baseball will be free-of-charge for its first 12 weeks of broadcasts, although this was later extended for the rest of the inaugural season.

On April 7, 2022, Apple announced that Melanie Newman, Chris Young, Hannah Keyser, and Brooke Fletcher would be the inaugural broadcast crew for east coast games, while Stephen Nelson, Hunter Pence, Katie Nolan, and Heidi Watney would be the broadcast crew for west coast games. Lauren Gardner was announced as the pregame and postgame studio host, along with a rotation of MLB Network studio analysts including Carlos Peña, Cliff Floyd, and Yonder Alonso. Former MLB umpire Brian Gorman was also hired as a rules analyst. All games feature both the road team and home team's radio broadcasts as a second audio program option.

On September 23, 2022, St. Louis Cardinals designated hitter Albert Pujols hit the 700th home run of his career during a Friday Night Baseball game against the Los Angeles Dodgers.

With the announcement of the Friday Night Baseball schedule for the first half of the 2023 MLB season, Apple announced that they had signed a deal with DirecTV to distribute Friday Night Baseball to their commercial subscribers, ensuring availability to venues (such as bars and restaurants) that were not readily equipped to handle streaming-only broadcasts. DirecTV had previously signed similar deals with Amazon Prime Video for their Thursday Night Football broadcasts, as well as with Apple for MLS Season Pass broadcasts. Apple also announced that they would add alternative audio feeds allowing viewers in the United States and Canada to listen to local radio broadcasts from the home team or the away team instead of the regular audio feed. It was also announced that, unlike the inaugural season, an Apple TV+ subscription would now be required to watch Friday Night Baseball.

For the 2024 MLB season, Apple announced that its studio coverage would be on-site for select games. On June 5, 2024, The Athletic reported that Apple TV+ would not enforce its exclusivity for the June 7 Dodgers-Yankees matchup scheduled to air on the platform in order to allow YES Network, in New York, and Spectrum SportsNet LA, in Los Angeles, to air the game locally. The other two games in the three game series was aired by Fox and ESPN respectively.

In August 2025, it was reported that Apple will end its contract with MLB early, and discontinue Friday Night Baseball following the 2025 season. Subsequent reports stated that Apple TV would retain its current package of telecasts through the end of the existing contract.

In September 2025, Apple TV+ and Sportsnet in Canada, reached an agreement to allow the Apple TV+ broadcast of a Blue Jays game against the Royals, which could potentially see the Blue Jays clinch a playoff spot, to be simulcast on Sportsnet. In exchange, Apple TV+ will exclusively broadcast a Blue Jays game against the Rays a week later.

All of the Chicago Cubs' appearances as a home team on Apple TV+ have been scheduled as a special afternoon edition of Friday Night Baseball. This is due to a long-standing city ordinance that prohibit Friday night games at Wrigley Field, unless the Cubs receive special permission.

== Commentators ==
=== Current ===
==== Broadcasters ====
- Alex Faust - play-by-play (2023–present)
- Wayne Randazzo - play-by-play (2022–present)
- Ryan Spilborghs - analyst (2023–present)
- Dontrelle Willis - analyst (2023–present)
- Tricia Whitaker - field reporter (2022–present)
- Heidi Watney - field reporter (2022–present)
- Rich Waltz - fill-in play-by-play (2023–present)
- Dan Plesac - fill-in analyst (2022–present)
- Yonder Alonso - fill-in analyst (2022–present)
- Xavier Scruggs - fill-in analyst (2024–present)
- Taylor McGregor - fill-in field reporter (2022–present)

==== Studio analysts ====
- Siera Santos - host (2023–present)
- Chris Young - analyst (2022–present)
- Russell Dorsey - analyst (2022–present)
- Xavier Scruggs - analyst (2023–present)
- Matt Joyce - analyst (2023–present)
- Frank Thomas - analyst (2023–present)
- Anthony Rizzo - analyst (2025–present)
- Brian Gorman - rules analyst (2022–present)
- Dale Scott - rules analyst (2023–present)
- Ted Barrett - rules analyst (2023–present)

=== Former ===
- Lauren Gardner - host (2022–2026)
- Stephen Nelson - play-by-play (2022)
- Melanie Newman - play-by-play (2022)
- Scott Braun – fill-in play-by-play (2022)
- Hannah Keyser - analyst (2022)
- Katie Nolan - analyst (2022)
- Hunter Pence - analyst (2022)
- Carlos Peña - analyst (2022)
- Cliff Floyd - analyst (2022)
- Anthony Recker - analyst (2022)
- Brooke Fletcher - field reporter (2022, first half of season)

== Reception ==
The initial Friday Night Baseball broadcasts were met with mixed reviews that largely praised its visual production, but criticized its commentary crew's performance. Many fans objected to the games being unavailable on cable television networks and to the need for additional hardware to watch Friday Night Baseball on their televisions.

Six Colors praised its "special" production which "push[ed] the envelope", noting that the production featured more cameras than a typical broadcast, and more commentators, which he compared to the higher production fare often reserved for ESPN's Sunday Night Baseball broadcasts, or postseason games, which are produced by other broadcasters such as Fox Sports. The Six Colors review praised the diversity of the commentary crew, while criticizing the volume of commercials (including product placement) and the lack of a rewind feature in the Apple TV+ app. A writer for The Verge said that the debut broadcast "left some fans frustrated and disappointed", upset with streaming issues and poor commentary quality. Some fans found the commentary to be "distracting, and sometimes blatantly off-topic".

WFAN hosts Gregg Giannotti and Boomer Esiason, during their radio show Boomer and Gio, were more negative about the initial broadcast. Giannotti said, "They don't think the game stands on its own. They were talking about a lot of things that have nothing to do with the game … they're putting people in there that don't have any experience". Esiason said that the broadcast was "unlistenable", but that he expects improvements in the future.

Apple Insider noted that while many praised the debut broadcast's minimalist score bug, some viewers mocked it, and noted that the commentary team wandered off-topic and seemed to have a "lack of enthusiasm for on-field events". TechRadar wrote that viewers found that commentators didn't appear to understand the importance of the plays during the game. The outlet also praised the production technology used, noting that it utilized a Sony α7R IV, DJI Ronin-S, Phantom Camera, and a 1080p wireless transmitter allowing the game to be viewed at 60 frames per second, and that its use of narrow focus for some of the camera angles "creates a recognizable cinematic effect … that instantly raises the drama."

Before the September 23, 2022, Yankees/Red Sox broadcast, where Aaron Judge of the Yankees would be attempting to tie an American League record with 61 home runs, New York State attorney general Letitia James urged Major League Baseball to allow the game to simulcast on the YES Network. The network is widely available on cable providers in New York State, which would have allowed the game to be more widely televised. Major League Baseball denied this request, and the game aired exclusively on Apple TV+ as planned. James was also criticized for advocating for a game that was made available to stream for free to also be made available on pay-TV services, when Amazon (who owns a stake in YES Network) were locking some Yankees games behind their Prime Video service in the team’s home market (Amazon would eventually allow the last game in their package that season to be simulcasted on YES Network).
