= 2023 Major League Baseball season =

2023 MLB season
- League: Major League Baseball
- Sport: Baseball
- Duration: March 30 – November 1, 2023
- Games: 162
- Teams: 30
- TV partner(s): Fox/FS1; TBS; ESPN/ABC; MLB Network
- Streaming partner(s): MLB.tv; Apple TV+ Peacock; Max (Postseason only)

Draft
- Top draft pick: Paul Skenes
- Picked by: Pittsburgh Pirates

Regular season
- Season MVP: NL: Ronald Acuña Jr. (ATL); AL: Shohei Ohtani (LAA)

Postseason
- AL champions: Texas Rangers
- AL runners-up: Houston Astros
- NL champions: Arizona Diamondbacks
- NL runners-up: Philadelphia Phillies

World Series
- Champions: Texas Rangers
- Runners-up: Arizona Diamondbacks
- World Series MVP: Corey Seager (TEX)

MLB seasons
- ← 2022 2024 →

Locations of AL teams for the 2022–2024 MLB seasons
West Central East
Locations of NL teams for the 2017–present MLB seasons
West Central East

The 2023 Major League Baseball season (MLB) began on March 30, while the regular season ended on October 1. The postseason began on October 3. The World Series then began on October 27 and ended on November 1 with the Texas Rangers defeating the Arizona Diamondbacks in five games to win their first title in franchise history.

The 93rd All-Star Game was played on July 11, hosted by the Seattle Mariners at T-Mobile Park in Seattle, Washington, with the National League winning, 3–2.

This season saw the introduction of several rule changes: in an effort to create a quicker pace of play, a pitch clock was introduced along with other minor changes, while limits on defensive shifts and larger bases were also introduced.

== Schedule ==
On August 24, 2022, Major League Baseball released its 2023 schedule. There were 162 games scheduled for all teams. This season was the first MLB season of a new balanced schedule in which every team played each other at least once, similar to the NBA and NHL. The new balanced schedule included 13 games against their division rivals, totaling 52 games. Each team played six games against six opponents and seven games against four opponents in the same league for a total of 64 games. Each team also played 46 interleague games, including a four-game home-and-home series against their designated interleague rival.

As part of the "MLB World Tour", the San Francisco Giants and the San Diego Padres played a two-game series at Alfredo Harp Helú Stadium in Mexico City on April 29–30, while the St. Louis Cardinals and the Chicago Cubs played a two-game series at London Stadium in London on June 24–25. The 93rd All-Star Game was played on July 11, hosted by the Seattle Mariners at T-Mobile Park in Seattle. The MLB Little League Classic featured the Philadelphia Phillies against the Washington Nationals on August 20. The Nationals won the game 4–3.

Opening Day, March 30, featured all thirty teams, the first time since 1968 that every team has started their season on the same day.

The MLB at Field of Dreams game was not held in 2023 due to the construction of a new youth baseball and softball complex at the Field of Dreams site near Dyersville, Iowa.

== Rule changes ==
On September 8, 2022, MLB announced a set of rules changes that would take effect in 2023.

- A pitch clock was introduced, with these requirements:
  - A standardized period of 30 seconds between batters within each half-inning.
  - A timer between pitches of 15 seconds with the bases empty, and 20 seconds with at least one runner on base.
  - The pitcher must start his motion before the expiration of the pitch clock. A violation will result in an automatic ball.
  - The batter must be in the box and alert to the pitcher with no less than eight seconds remaining. A violation will result in an automatic strike.
- During the season, the MLB clarified several rules regarding pitch clocks on pitchers and batters:
  - A pitcher no longer may come set prior to the batter becoming alert in the box; umpires are to issue warnings and then automatic ball if the pitcher violates. This comes after Max Scherzer of the New York Mets uses the pitch clock to throw off the timing of Washington Nationals batters.
  - A batter is no longer allowed to bait pitchers into quick pitch violations by engaging with the pitcher, gets into a hitting position, and has one or both feet out of the box while the pitcher is coming set come set prior to the batter becoming alert in the box; umpires are to issue warnings and then automatic strikes if the batter violates. This comes after Willson Contreras of the St. Louis Cardinals earned three automatic balls and a walk for these types of acts against Kenley Jansen of the Boston Red Sox.
  - With runners on base, the timer resets if the pitcher attempts a pickoff or steps off the rubber (collectively called a "disengagement").
  - Only two disengagements are allowed per plate appearance; however, this count resets if a baserunner advances. Mound visits, injury timeouts, and offensive team timeouts do not count against this.
  - If a third disengagement results in anything other than a successful pickoff attempt, it is treated as a balk and all runners advance one base.
  - If a team has used up all of its allowed five mound visits by the ninth inning, it receives an extra visit in the ninth.
  - Umpires can provide extra time if circumstances warrant.
- Infield shifts are restricted:
  - The defensive team must have no fewer than four players in infield positions, with at least two on each side of second base.
  - All infielders must have both feet on or inside the outer edge of the marked infield while the pitcher is on the rubber.
  - Infielders cannot switch sides of the infield before a pitch is released.
  - If infielders are improperly aligned at the time of the pitch, the offensive team may choose to accept the result of the play or receive an automatic ball.
- All three bases will increase in size from 15 to 18 inches (38 to 46 cm).

Further changes were announced on February 13:

- In regular-season games, the WBSC softball extra innings rule is in effect, with each extra inning starting with a runner on second base. WBSC, the global governing body of baseball, implemented tiebreakers at international tournaments starting in 2008, and in MLB regular season play, was first used in the COVID-abbreviated 2020 season and again in the lockout-altered 2022 season.
- The rule that regulates when position players can pitch, was tweaked. Previously, position players were allowed to pitch when either team had a lead of at least six runs. Starting with this season:
  - The leading team can only use a position player in this role in the ninth inning and with a lead of at least 10 runs.
  - A team behind by eight or more runs can use a position player to pitch at any time in the game.
  - The use of position players as pitchers in extra innings is unrestricted, as it was under the previous rule.

== Spring training ==
Spring training for the 2023 season began in late February and lasted through March. Teams began workouts and practice for spring training beginning in late February. Pitchers and catchers reported first, followed by position players a few days later.

Prior to the start of the regular season, each team played between 27 and 33 spring training games, beginning on February 24. There were several times during spring training when a team had two different squads playing different teams simultaneously. In addition to spring training games, teams occasionally played exhibition games with non-MLB teams, such as Minor League Baseball teams, independent teams, or college teams. These exhibition games were not counted in the spring training standings. Spring training ended on March 28, two days before the Opening Day.

== Standings ==
=== American League ===
AL East
Team	W	L	Pct.	GB	Home	Road
^{(1)} Baltimore Orioles	101	61	.623	—	49‍–‍32	52‍–‍29
^{(4)} Tampa Bay Rays	99	63	.611	2	53‍–‍28	46‍–‍35
^{(6)} Toronto Blue Jays	89	73	.549	12	43‍–‍38	46‍–‍35
New York Yankees	82	80	.506	19	42‍–‍39	40‍–‍41
Boston Red Sox	78	84	.481	23	39‍–‍42	39‍–‍42

AL Central
Team	W	L	Pct.	GB	Home	Road
^{(3)} Minnesota Twins	87	75	.537	—	47‍–‍34	40‍–‍41
Detroit Tigers	78	84	.481	9	37‍–‍44	41‍–‍40
Cleveland Guardians	76	86	.469	11	42‍–‍39	34‍–‍47
Chicago White Sox	61	101	.377	26	31‍–‍50	30‍–‍51
Kansas City Royals	56	106	.346	31	33‍–‍48	23‍–‍58

AL West
Team	W	L	Pct.	GB	Home	Road
^{(2)} Houston Astros	90	72	.556	—	39‍–‍42	51‍–‍30
^{(5)} Texas Rangers	90	72	.556	—	50‍–‍31	40‍–‍41
Seattle Mariners	88	74	.543	2	45‍–‍36	43‍–‍38
Los Angeles Angels	73	89	.451	17	38‍–‍43	35‍–‍46
Oakland Athletics	50	112	.309	40	26‍–‍55	24‍–‍57

=== National League ===
NL East
Team	W	L	Pct.	GB	Home	Road
^{(1)} Atlanta Braves	104	58	.642	—	52‍–‍29	52‍–‍29
^{(4)} Philadelphia Phillies	90	72	.556	14	49‍–‍32	41‍–‍40
^{(5)} Miami Marlins	84	78	.519	20	46‍–‍35	38‍–‍43
New York Mets	75	87	.463	29	43‍–‍38	32‍–‍49
Washington Nationals	71	91	.438	33	34‍–‍47	37‍–‍44

NL Central
Team	W	L	Pct.	GB	Home	Road
^{(3)} Milwaukee Brewers	92	70	.568	—	49‍–‍32	43‍–‍38
Chicago Cubs	83	79	.512	9	45‍–‍36	38‍–‍43
Cincinnati Reds	82	80	.506	10	38‍–‍43	44‍–‍37
Pittsburgh Pirates	76	86	.469	16	39‍–‍42	37‍–‍44
St. Louis Cardinals	71	91	.438	21	35‍–‍46	36‍–‍45

NL West
Team	W	L	Pct.	GB	Home	Road
^{(2)} Los Angeles Dodgers	100	62	.617	—	53‍–‍28	47‍–‍34
^{(6)} Arizona Diamondbacks	84	78	.519	16	43‍–‍38	41‍–‍40
San Diego Padres	82	80	.506	18	44‍–‍37	38‍–‍43
San Francisco Giants	79	83	.488	21	45‍–‍36	34‍–‍47
Colorado Rockies	59	103	.364	41	37‍–‍44	22‍–‍59

== Postseason ==
The Postseason began on October 3 and ended with Game 5 on November 1.

=== Bracket ===
Wild Card Series (ALWCS, NLWCS)
4	Tampa Bay	0
5	Texas	2
3	Minnesota	2
6	Toronto	0
4	Philadelphia	2
5	Miami	0
3	Milwaukee	0
6	Arizona	2

Division Series (ALDS, NLDS)
1	Baltimore	0
5	Texas	3
American League
2	Houston	3
3	Minnesota	1
1	Atlanta	1
4	Philadelphia	3
National League
2	LA Dodgers	0
6	Arizona	3

Championship Series (ALCS, NLCS)
5	Texas	4
2	Houston	3
4	Philadelphia	3
6	Arizona	4

World Series
AL5	Texas	4
NL6	Arizona	1

== Managerial changes ==
=== General managers ===
==== Offseason ====
Team	Former GM	Reason For Leaving	New GM	Notes
Detroit Tigers	Al Avila	Fired	Jeff Greenberg	On August 10, 2022, Avila was fired after a seven-year tenure as the general manager of the team. Sam Menzin was named interim general manager. On September 21, 2023, Greenberg was named the new GM of the Tigers.
San Francisco Giants	Scott Harris	Hired by the Detroit Tigers	Pete Putila	Harris left the Giants for the president of baseball operations role in the Tigers organization. On October 10, 2022, Houston Astros assistant general manager Pete Putila was named the new general manager of the Giants.
Seattle Mariners	Jerry Dipoto	Promoted to director of operations and front office	Justin Hollander	Dipoto resigned from his general manager role and was promoted to the director of operations and the front office. On October 2, 2022, assistant general manager Justin Hollander was named the new general manager of the team.
Houston Astros	James Click	Contract expired	Dana Brown	On November 11, 2022, the team announced that Click will not be retained. On January 26, 2023, Dana Brown was named the new general manager of the Astros.

==== In-season ====
Team	Former GM	Reason For Leaving	New GM	Notes
Chicago White Sox	Rick Hahn	Fired	Chris Getz	On August 22, Hahn and executive vice president Kenny Williams were fired. Hahn and Williams have held their respective titles since 2012. On August 31, White Sox assistant general manager Chris Getz was promoted to general manager and senior vice president.

=== Field managers ===
==== Offseason ====
Team	Former Manager	Interim Manager	Reason For Leaving	New Manager	Notes
Philadelphia Phillies	Joe Girardi	Rob Thomson	Fired	Rob Thomson	On June 3, 2022, the Phillies fired Girardi. In two-plus seasons as manager of the Phillies, he compiled a record of 132–141 (.484) with no playoff appearances. Thomson, the bench coach, was named interim manager on June 3. This is his first managerial position. On October 10, the team announced that they had signed Thomson as manager through the 2024 season after he guided the team to the 2022 World Series in the team's first postseason appearance since 2011.
Los Angeles Angels	Joe Maddon	Phil Nevin	Fired	Phil Nevin	On June 7, 2022, the Angels fired Maddon. In two-plus seasons with the Angels, he compiled a record of 130–148 (.468) with no playoff appearances. Nevin, the third-base coach, was named the interim manager on June 7. This is his first managerial position. On October 5, the Angels announced Nevin would be retained as manager for the 2023 season.
Toronto Blue Jays	Charlie Montoyo	John Schneider	Fired	John Schneider	On July 13, 2022, after losing 10 of their last 13 games, the Blue Jays fired Montoyo. In four-plus seasons with the Blue Jays, he compiled a record of 236–236 (.500) with one wild card playoff appearance in 2020, losing in the Wild Card Series. Schneider, the bench coach, was named the interim manager on July 13. This is his first managerial position. On October 21, Schneider got the permanent job, and he was signed to a three-year deal.
Texas Rangers	Chris Woodward	Tony Beasley	Fired	Bruce Bochy	On August 15, 2022, the Rangers fired Woodward. In three-plus seasons with the Rangers, he compiled a record of 211–287 (.424) with no playoff appearances and no winning records. Beasley, the third-base coach, was appointed the interim manager on the same day. This is his first managerial position. On October 21, the Rangers announced Bruce Bochy as the 20th manager in franchise history, signing a three-year deal. In 25 seasons as the manager of the San Diego Padres (1995–2006), and San Francisco Giants (2007–2019), Bochy compiled a 2003–2029 (.497) record with six division titles, eight playoff appearances, and a playoff record of 44–33 (.571), winning three World Series championships with the Giants.
Miami Marlins	Don Mattingly	None	Contract expired	Skip Schumaker	On September 25, 2022, the Marlins announced that Mattingly would not return to manage the team in 2023 after seven seasons with the team and only one playoff appearance in 2020. On October 25, St. Louis Cardinals bench coach and former Major League Baseball player Skip Schumaker was named the new manager of the team. This was his first managerial position.
Chicago White Sox	Tony La Russa	Miguel Cairo	Retired	Pedro Grifol	On October 2, 2022, the White Sox announced that La Russa would retire because of health issues. He guided them to the 2021 AL Central Division title, making his only postseason appearance with the team in his second stint. Grifol was hired on November 1. Previously an assistant coach for the Kansas City Royals, this is his first managerial position.
Kansas City Royals	Mike Matheny	None	Fired	Matt Quatraro	On October 5, 2022, hours after the season ended, the Royals announced that Matheny would not return to the team for a fourth season after three years with the team and no playoff appearances. Matheny ended his three-year tenure with a record of 165–219 (.430). On October 30, Tampa Bay Rays bench coach Matt Quatraro was named the new manager of the team. This is his first managerial position.

==== In-season ====
Team	Former manager	Interim manager	Reason for leaving	New manager	Notes
San Francisco Giants	Gabe Kapler	Kai Correa	Fired	Bob Melvin	On September 29, the Giants fired Kapler. In four seasons as manager of the Giants, he compiled a record of 295–248 (.543) with one playoff appearance in 2021. Correa, the bench coach, was named interim manager on September 29 for the remainder of the season. This is his first managerial position. Melvin was hired on October 25. This will be his fifth managerial position, previously managing in Seattle, Arizona, Oakland, and San Diego, compiling a lifetime managerial record of 1,517–1,425 (.516).

== League leaders ==
=== American League ===
Hitting leaders
Stat	Player	Total
AVG	Yandy Díaz (TB)	.330
OPS	Shohei Ohtani (LAA)	1.066
HR	Shohei Ohtani (LAA)	44
RBI	Kyle Tucker (HOU)	112
R	Marcus Semien (TEX)	122
H	Marcus Semien (TEX)	185
SB	Esteury Ruiz (OAK)	67

Pitching leaders
Stat	Player	Total
W	Chris Bassitt (TOR); Zach Eflin (TB)	16
L	Jordan Lyles (KC)	17
ERA	Gerrit Cole (NYY)	2.63
K	Kevin Gausman (TOR)	237
IP	Gerrit Cole (NYY)	209.0
SV	Emmanuel Clase (CLE)	44
WHIP	Gerrit Cole (NYY)	0.981

=== National League ===
Hitting leaders
Stat	Player	Total
AVG	Luis Arráez (MIA)	.354
OPS	Ronald Acuña Jr. (ATL)	1.012
HR	Matt Olson (ATL)	54
RBI	Matt Olson (ATL)	139
R	Ronald Acuña Jr. (ATL)	149
H	Ronald Acuña Jr. (ATL)	217
SB	Ronald Acuña Jr. (ATL)	73

Pitching leaders
Stat	Player	Total
W	Spencer Strider (ATL)	20
L	Patrick Corbin (WSH)	15
ERA	Blake Snell (SD)	2.25
K	Spencer Strider (ATL)	281
IP	Logan Webb (SF)	216.0
SV	David Bednar (PIT); Camilo Doval (SF)	39
WHIP	Corbin Burnes (MIL)	1.069

== Milestones ==
=== Batters ===
- Trayce Thompson (CWS)/(LAD):
  - As a member of the Dodgers, in his season debut on April 1 against the Arizona Diamondbacks, Thompson drove in eight runs. He is the first player in major league history to drive in eight or more runs in their season debut since the RBI became an official statistic in 1920.
- Anthony Volpe (NYY):
  - With Volpe's stolen base in the seventh inning against the San Francisco Giants on April 2, Volpe became the fifth player since 1901 to steal a base in each of his first three Major League games.
- Elvis Andrus (CWS):
  - Recorded his 2,000th career hit with a single in the fifth inning on April 5 against the San Francisco Giants. He became the 293rd player to reach this mark.
- Jordan Walker (STL):
  - With a ninth-inning single on April 12 against the Colorado Rockies, Walker has now recorded a hit in each of his first 12 consecutive games to begin his big league career. He joins Eddie Murphy, who accomplished this in 1912, as the only Major League players since 1900 to accomplish this feat before their 21st birthday. Walker's streak ended on April 13 against the Pittsburgh Pirates at 12 consecutive games.
- Mike Trout (LAA):
  - With a double in the first inning against the Boston Red Sox on April 15, Trout became the fourth player in major league history to collect at least 300 career doubles, 300 career homers, and 200 stolen bases by his age-31 season. Trout joins Barry Bonds, Alex Rodriguez, and Willie Mays.
- Adolis García (TEX):
  - Became the fourth player in major league history to hit three home runs and two doubles in one game on April 22 against the Oakland Athletics. He joins Kris Bryant, Matt Carpenter, and Alex Dickerson to accomplish this feat.
- Josh Naylor (CLE):
  - Became the first player since at least 1961 to hit a go-ahead home run in the eighth inning or later in three consecutive games, on May 12, 13 and 14 against the Los Angeles Angels.
- Andrew McCutchen (PIT):
  - Recorded his 2,000th career hit with a single in the first inning on June 11 against the New York Mets. He became the 294th player to reach this mark.
- Ronald Acuña Jr. (ATL):
  - Became the first player in major league history to tally 30-plus stolen bases and 15-plus home runs within the first 70 games of a season with his steal on June 16 against the Colorado Rockies.
  - Became the first player in major league history to record 40-plus stolen bases, hit 20-plus homers, and record 50-plus RBIs before the All-Star break with his steal on July 3 against the Cleveland Guardians.
  - Became the first player in major league history to record 50-plus stolen bases and hit 20-plus homers before August 1 with his stolen base on July 29 against the Milwaukee Brewers.
  - Became the fourth player in major league history – joining Rickey Henderson, Joe Morgan, and Eric Davis – to record 20-plus homers and 60-plus steals in a season with his steal on August 28 against the Colorado Rockies.
  - Became the first player in major league history to record 30-plus homers and 60-plus steals in a season on August 31 with a home run against the Los Angeles Dodgers.
  - Became the fifth player in major league history to record 40-plus homers and 40-plus steals in a season on September 22 against the Washington Nationals. He joins Jose Canseco (1988), Barry Bonds (1996), Alex Rodriguez (1998), and Alfonso Soriano (2006). Acuña, with this 40th home run, became the first member of the 40-homer/50-stolen base and 40-homer/60-stolen base clubs.
  - With his second stolen base of the game on September 27 against the Chicago Cubs, Acuña reached 70 stolen bases this season. He becomes the first player to join the 40-homer/70-stolen base club.
- Freddie Freeman (LAD):
  - Recorded his 2,000th career hit with a double in the eighth inning on June 25 against the Houston Astros. He became the 295th player to reach this mark.
- Bo Naylor / Josh Naylor (CLE):
  - Became the first brothers in major league history to hit multi-run home runs in the same inning for the same team on July 14 against the Texas Rangers.
- Fernando Tatis Jr. (SD):
  - Hit his 100th career home run on August 2 against the Colorado Rockies becoming the fourth-fastest in major league history to reach 100 home runs, by games played. Tatis took 362 games to reach this mark with only Ryan Howard (325 games), Pete Alonso (347), and Gary Sanchez (355) doing it faster.
- Bobby Witt Jr. (KC):
  - With his 20th home run of the season on August 4 against the Philadelphia Phillies, Witt Jr. became the first player in major league history with at least 20 home runs and 30 stolen bases in each of his first two big league seasons.
- Davis Schneider (TOR):
  - On August 6, Schneider became the first player in major league history to collect at least nine hits and at least two home runs over his first three big league games.
- Jose Altuve (HOU):
  - Recorded his 2,000th career hit with a single in the fifth inning on August 19 against the Seattle Mariners. He became the 296th player to reach this mark.
- Julio Rodríguez (SEA):
  - Set a Major League record for most hits in a four-game span with 17 after his four-hit performance on August 19 against the Houston Astros. Rodríguez broke the record of 16 that was set in 1925 by Milt Stock.
  - Hit his 25th home run of the season on September 4 against the Cincinnati Reds becoming the first player in major league history to register at least 25 homers and 25 steals in each of his first two seasons.
- Corbin Carroll (AZ):
  - With his 40th stolen base on August 27 against the Cincinnati Reds, Corbin became the fourth rookie in major league history to amass at least 20 home runs and 40 stolen bases in a season. He joins Tommie Agee (1966), Mitchell Page (1977), and Mike Trout (2012) to accomplish this feat.
  - Became the first rookie in major league history to compile 25 or more home runs and 50-plus stolen bases in a season. He accomplished this feat on September 20 against the San Francisco Giants with two stolen bases and a home run.
- Aaron Judge (NYY):
  - Hit his 250th home run in his 810th career game becoming the fastest player in major league history to hit the milestone. Judge set the record on September 1 against the Houston Astros, breaking the record that was held by Ryan Howard who accomplished this in 855 games.
- Giancarlo Stanton (NYY):
  - Recorded his 400th career home run in the sixth inning on September 5 against the Detroit Tigers. He became the 58th player, and fourth fastest in games, to reach this mark.
- Royce Lewis (MIN):
  - With his grand slam that he hit on September 15 against the Chicago White Sox, Lewis became the first player in major league history to hit five grand slams within his first 16 career home runs. Lewis also became the first player to hit four grand slams in a span of 18 games or fewer. The prior shortest span in which a player had hit four grand slams was 39 games, by Don Mattingly in 1987.
- Mookie Betts (LAD):
  - With a two-run double on September 23 against the San Francisco Giants, Betts set the Major League record for most RBIs for a leadoff hitter in a season with 105. He broke the record, of 103, which was set in 2017 by Charlie Blackmon. He finished the season with 107 RBI from the leadoff position.
- Esteury Ruiz (OAK):
  - Set the American League rookie record for most stolen bases in a season with 67. Ruiz broke the record that was set by Kenny Lofton in 1992.
- Corey Seager (TEX):
  - Became the first player to walk five times in a postseason game (American League Division Series, Game 2) against the Baltimore Orioles on October 8.
- Nick Castellanos (PHI):
  - Became the first player in major league history to record consecutive multi-homer postseason games in Game 3 and Game 4 of the National League Division Series against the Atlanta Braves.
- Kyle Schwarber (PHI):
  - Hit his fourth career lead-off home run on October 16 against the Arizona Diamondbacks in Game 1 of the National League Championship Series, setting a new Major League postseason record. Schwarber broke the record of three that he shared with Derek Jeter and Jimmy Rollins.
- Ketel Marte (AZ):
  - With his double in the seventh inning in Game 7 of the National League Championship Series against the Philadelphia Phillies, Marte extended his postseason hitting streak to 16 games, making it the longest by any player to start his postseason career in major league history, breaking the record that was held by Marquis Grissom.
  - Extended his postseason hitting streak to 18 games with a two-run single in Game 2 of the World Series, setting a new Major League record. Marte was tied at 17 games with Hank Bauer, Derek Jeter, and Manny Ramírez. His streak ended in the final game of the 2023 World Series at 20 games.

=== Pitchers ===
==== Perfect games ====
- Domingo Germán (NYY):
  - Pitched the 24th perfect game in major league history and the fourth in franchise history on June 28 against the Oakland Athletics. Germán threw 99 pitches, 72 for strikes, and struck out nine in the 11–0 victory.

==== No-hitters ====
- Matt Manning / Jason Foley / Alex Lange (DET):
  - Combined to throw the ninth no-hitter in franchise history, and the 20th combined no-hitter in major league history, by defeating the Toronto Blue Jays 2–0 on July 8. Manning went 6 2/3 innings, throwing 91 pitches with 57 for strikes. He walked three and struck out five. Foley went the next 1 1/3 innings, striking out one with his 15 pitches (12 for strikes). Lange closed out the no-hitter with ten pitches (nine for strikes) and struck out one.
- Framber Valdez (HOU):
  - Valdez threw the sixteenth no-hitter in franchise history, and the first by a left-hander, by defeating the Cleveland Guardians 2–0 on August 1. Valdez threw 93 pitches, 65 of them for strikes, while facing the minimum amount of batters, despite allowing a walk. He struck out seven.
- Michael Lorenzen (PHI):
  - Lorenzen threw the 14th no-hitter in franchise history, and first since 2015, by defeating the Washington Nationals 7–0 on August 9. Lorenzen threw 124 pitches, 76 for strikes, while walking four and striking out five.

==== Other pitching accomplishments ====
- Tim Herrin (CLE):
  - In his Major League debut on April 2 against the Seattle Mariners, Herrin faced four batters and struck them all out. Herrin became the first pitcher to face at least four batters in his debut and strike all of them out since the mound was moved to its current distance in 1893.
- Andrew Heaney (TEX):
  - In a game against the Kansas City Royals on April 10, Heaney tied the American League record of nine consecutive strikeouts. Heaney shares the record with Tyler Alexander and Doug Fister.
- Clayton Kershaw (LAD):
  - Recorded his 200th career win on April 18 against the New York Mets. He became the 121st player to reach this mark. He also became the sixth pitcher in major league history to have reached their 200th career win without having lost at least 100 games at the time. The others are Grover Alexander, Lefty Grove, Whitey Ford, Juan Marichal, and Pedro Martinez.
- Bryce Miller (SEA):
  - Became the third player in major league history to record 10-plus strikeouts and zero walks in his debut on May 2 against the Oakland Athletics, joining Stephen Strasburg and Johnny Cueto.
  - Became the first pitcher, since 1901, to go at least six innings in his first three major league starts while giving up one run or less, three hits or fewer, and one walk or fewer in all three games.
- Shohei Ohtani (LAA):
  - Passed Babe Ruth for most career strikeouts by a two-way player, with 502, on May 9 against the Houston Astros. He also has the most career strikeouts with at least 100 career home runs.
- Kenley Jansen (BOS):
  - Recorded his 400th career save by closing out the victory on May 10 against the Atlanta Braves. He became the seventh player to reach this mark.
- Justin Verlander (HOU)/(NYM):
  - With his victory against the Cincinnati Reds on May 10, Verlander became the 21st pitcher in major league history to defeat all 30 teams.
  - Recorded his 250th career win on July 30 against the Washington Nationals. He became the 49th player to reach this mark.
  - Started his 500th career game on August 11 against the Los Angeles Angels, becoming the 50th player in major league history to reach this mark.
- Zack Greinke (KC):
  - By striking out Joey Wiemer of the Milwaukee Brewers on May 13, he became the fifth pitcher in major league history to strike out 1,000 different batters. The others that have accomplished this feat: Nolan Ryan, Randy Johnson, Greg Maddux, and Roger Clemens.
- Gerrit Cole (NYY):
  - Recorded his 2,000th career strikeout by punching out Jorge Mateo of the Baltimore Orioles in the second inning on May 23. Cole became the third-fastest pitcher in major league history to reach this mark (in terms of games pitched and innings) and the 87th pitcher all-time.
- Craig Kimbrel (PHI):
  - Recorded his 400th career save by closing out the victory on May 26 against the Atlanta Braves. He became the eighth player to reach this mark and also the third fastest (in terms of appearances).
- Andrew Abbott (CIN):
  - On June 17 against the Houston Astros, Abbott became the first Major League pitcher since 1893, the year the pitching mound was moved back to its current distance, to begin his career with three scoreless starts of at least five innings.
- Eury Pérez (MIA):
  - On June 25, at 20 years and 71 days old, Pérez became the youngest player since at least 1901 to record three consecutive scoreless outings of six-plus innings.
- Spencer Strider (ATL):
  - Struck out 13 batters on July 20 against the Arizona Diamondbacks and became the first pitcher in major league history to strike out at least 350 batters in his first 40 career starts. He has totaled 354 strikeouts in his first 40 professional starts.
  - On August 1, Strider became the fastest pitcher in major league history to amass 200 strikeouts in a season. Strider accomplished this feat in 123 1/3 innings, breaking the record he set in 2022 in 130 innings.
- Yu Darvish (SD):
  - With his sixth-inning strikeout of Baltimore's Ramón Urías on August 14, Darvish became the all-time Major League strikeout leader among pitchers born in Japan. With his 1,919th strikeout, Darvish passed the record that was held by Hideo Nomo.
- Adam Wainwright (STL):
  - Recorded his 200th career win on September 18 against the Milwaukee Brewers. He became the 122nd pitcher to reach this mark.

=== Miscellaneous ===
- Boston Red Sox:
  - Became the third team since 1901 to score as many as nine runs in the first three games of a season, joining the 1976 Cincinnati Reds and the 1978 Milwaukee Brewers. The Red Sox accomplished this feat against the Baltimore Orioles on March 30 and April 2–3.
- Blake Sabol / Sean Manaea (SF):
  - On April 8, Sabol and Manaea became the first battery of Samoan descent in major league history when the two started the Giants' 6–5 loss against the Kansas City Royals.
- Tampa Bay Rays:
  - With a win against the Oakland Athletics on April 9, the Rays won their first nine games by at least four runs, which is the longest such streak to begin a season in the modern era and the longest in major league history since the 1884 St. Louis Maroons, The Rays defeated the Boston Red Sox 1–0 on April 10, ending this streak at nine games.
  - Won their 13th consecutive game to start a season by defeating the Boston Red Sox on April 13, tying the modern-era Major League record. They became the third team in history to start the season with 13 wins, joining the 1982 Atlanta Braves and the 1987 Milwaukee Brewers. On April 14, the winning streak came to an end in a game against the Toronto Blue Jays.
  - With a home run from Randy Arozarena against the Chicago White Sox on April 22, the Rays set the Major League record to hit at least one home run in each of the club's first 21 games of a season. They broke the record of 20 games that was set by the 2019 Seattle Mariners. They did not hit a home run on April 24 against the Houston Astros, ending their Major League record at 22 games.
  - With their win against the Houston Astros on April 24, the Rays set the modern-era Major League record with their 14th straight home win to begin the year. They broke the record of 13 that was set by the 2009 Los Angeles Dodgers. The longest record of all-time is 21 games set by the 1885 Chicago White Stockings. The streak came to an end on April 25 against the Astros.
  - With their win against the Los Angeles Angels on August 18, the Rays became the second team in major league history to hit into a triple play, give up a gland slam and still manage to win the game.
- Oakland Athletics:
  - Set the Major League record for the longest streak to start the season without a starting pitcher recording a win at 28 games on April 28 against the Cincinnati Reds, which broke the record that was held by the 2022 Pittsburgh Pirates. The all-time record for the number of consecutive games that a starting pitcher did not record a win is 43 games, set by the 2022 Washington Nationals. On May 5, against the Kansas City Royals, Oakland starting pitcher Kyle Muller was credited with the victory, stopping the streak at 32 games without a win by a starting pitcher from the beginning of the season.
  - Became the third team in major league history on June 13, and the first since 1895, to win seven consecutive games while entering the winning streak with a sub-.200 winning percentage. The Athletics entered this winning streak with a 12–50 (.194) record. The other teams were the 1895 Louisville Colonels (.192 winning percentage) and the 1885 Detroit Wolverines (.190). Their winning streak came to an end the next night as they lost to the Tampa Bay Rays.
- Miami Marlins:
  - Set the Major League record for most consecutive wins in one-run games at 12 on May 10 against the Arizona Diamondbacks, which broke the record that was held by the 1972 New York Mets. The Marlins lost their next one-run game on May 10 against the Cincinnati Reds ending the record at 12 games.
- Paul Goldschmidt (STL):
  - On June 24, Goldschmidt became the first player in major league history to play a regular-season game in five different countries: The United States, Australia, Canada, Mexico, and England.
- Atlanta Braves:
  - Set the National League record for most home runs hit in a month when they clubbed 61 during June. This total was also the third most in major league history for any month.
  - With their 167th home run on July 7 against the Tampa Bay Rays, the Braves set the Major League record for most home runs hit before the All-Star break. The record was held by the 2019 Minnesota Twins with 166 home runs. The Braves finished with 169 home runs before the All-Star break.
  - On August 13, Sean Murphy hit his 20th home run of the season, becoming the sixth Brave to reach that mark. The Braves set a Major League record with six players having at least 20 home runs in the fewest team games of 117.
  - Broke the National League record for most home runs in a season when they hit their 280th of the season on September 12 against the Philadelphia Phillies. They broke the record that was set in 2019 by the Los Angeles Dodgers.
  - Became the second team in major league history to have five players hit at least 30 home runs during a season on September 16 against the Miami Marlins. They tied the record that was set by the 2019 Minnesota Twins. The five Braves are: Ronald Acuña Jr., Ozzie Albies, Matt Olson, Marcell Ozuna, and Austin Riley.
  - Became the first team in major league history to have four players hit at least 35 home runs during a season on September 17 against the Miami Marlins. The four Braves are: Ronald Acuña Jr., Matt Olson, Marcell Ozuna, and Austin Riley.
  - Set the Major League record for most first-inning home runs in a season on September 28 against the Chicago Cubs with 47. This broke the record of 46 that was set in 2019 by the Cincinnati Reds. Matt Olson two-run homer set the record.
  - Tied the Major League record for most home runs by a team in a season with 307. The Braves tied the record that was set in 2019 by the Minnesota Twins.
  - Set a Major League record as they ended the season with a .501 slugging percentage, breaking the record that was held by the Houston Astros.
- Christian Encarnacion-Strand (CIN):
  - With his promotion to "The Show" on July 17 for the Cincinnati Reds, Encarnacion-Strand became the longest full name on record in major league history at 27 characters. The longest on record was Simeon Woods Richardson of the Minnesota Twins at 22 characters, who debuted last year.
- Major League Baseball:
  - Twelve teams scored 10+ runs on July 18, setting the Major League Modern Era record (since 1900) for most teams to post double-digit runs on the same day.
- Chicago Cubs:
  - Became the first team in major league history to record 10 extra-base hits and five homers in back-to-back games. The Cubs accomplished this feat on August 1–2 against the Cincinnati Reds.
- Baltimore Orioles:
  - With their win against the Los Angeles Angels on September 4, the Orioles were not swept for their 84th consecutive series setting an American League record for most series of at least two games without being swept.
- Arizona Diamondbacks:
  - Became the first team in major league history to hit four home runs in a single inning in a postseason game. This was accomplished against the Los Angeles Dodgers in Game 3 of the National League Division Series on October 11.
- Texas Rangers:
  - With their victory on the road in Game 4 of the 2023 World Series against the Arizona Diamondbacks, it was the Rangers' tenth straight road victory, setting the Major League record for most consecutive road wins in postseason history. The Rangers broke the record of nine that was held by two New York Yankees teams.

== Awards and honors ==
=== Regular season ===
Baseball Writers' Association of America Awards
BBWAA Award	National League	American League
Rookie of the Year	Corbin Carroll (AZ)	Gunnar Henderson (BAL)
Manager of the Year	Skip Schumaker (MIA)	Brandon Hyde (BAL)
Cy Young Award	Blake Snell (SD)	Gerrit Cole (NYY)
Most Valuable Player	Ronald Acuña Jr. (ATL)	Shohei Ohtani (LAA)
Gold Glove Awards
Position	National League	American League
Pitcher	Zack Wheeler (PHI)	José Berríos (TOR)
Catcher	Gabriel Moreno (AZ)	Jonah Heim (TEX)
1st Base	Christian Walker (AZ)	Nathaniel Lowe (TEX)
2nd Base	Nico Hoerner (CHC)	Andrés Giménez (CLE)
3rd Base	Ke'Bryan Hayes (PIT)	Matt Chapman (TOR)
Shortstop	Dansby Swanson (CHC)	Anthony Volpe (NYY)
Left field	Ian Happ (CHC)	Steven Kwan (CLE)
Center field	Brenton Doyle (COL)	Kevin Kiermaier (TOR)
Right field	Fernando Tatís Jr. (SD)	Adolis García (TEX)
Utility	Ha-seong Kim (SD)	Mauricio Dubón (HOU)
Team	Milwaukee Brewers	Toronto Blue Jays
Platinum Glove	Fernando Tatís Jr. (SD)	Andrés Giménez (CLE)
Silver Slugger Awards
Designated Hitter	Bryce Harper (PHI)	Shohei Ohtani (LAA)
Catcher	William Contreras (MIL)	Adley Rutschman (BAL)
1st Base	Matt Olson (ATL)	Yandy Díaz (TB)
2nd Base	Luis Arráez (MIA)	Marcus Semien (TEX)
3rd Base	Austin Riley (ATL)	Rafael Devers (BOS)
Shortstop	Francisco Lindor (NYM)	Corey Seager (TEX)
Outfield	Ronald Acuña Jr. (ATL); Mookie Betts (LAD); Juan Soto (SD)	Luis Robert Jr. (CWS); Julio Rodríguez (SEA); Kyle Tucker (HOU)
Utility	Cody Bellinger (CHC)	Gunnar Henderson (BAL)
Team	Atlanta Braves	Texas Rangers

=== All-MLB Team ===
Players are selected through fan votes (50%) and votes from a panel of experts (50%). The winners are selected based on merit, with no set number of nominees per position and no distinction between leagues.

All-MLB Team
Position	First Team	Second Team
Starting pitcher	Gerrit Cole (NYY)	Kyle Bradish (BAL)
Starting pitcher	Zac Gallen (AZ)	Nathan Eovaldi (TEX)
Starting pitcher	Shohei Ohtani (LAA)	Sonny Gray (MIN)
Starting pitcher	Blake Snell (SD)	Kevin Gausman (TOR)
Starting pitcher	Spencer Strider (ATL)	Jordan Montgomery (TEX)
Relief pitcher	Félix Bautista (BAL)	Emmanuel Clase (CLE)
Relief pitcher	Josh Hader (SD)	Devin Williams (MIL)
Designated hitter	Shohei Ohtani (LAA)	Yordan Alvarez (HOU)
Catcher	Adley Rutschman (BAL)	Jonah Heim (TEX)
1st Base	Freddie Freeman (LAD)	Matt Olson (ATL)
2nd Base	Marcus Semien (TEX)	Ozzie Albies (ATL)
3rd Base	Austin Riley (ATL)	José Ramírez (CLE)
Shortstop	Corey Seager (TEX)	Francisco Lindor (NYM)
Outfield	Ronald Acuña Jr. (ATL)	Adolis García (TEX)
Outfield	Mookie Betts (LAD)	Aaron Judge (NYY)
Outfield	Corbin Carroll (AZ)	Kyle Tucker (HOU)

=== Other awards ===
- The Sporting News Player of the Year Award: Ronald Acuña Jr. (ATL)
- Comeback Players of the Year: Cody Bellinger (CHC, National); Liam Hendriks (CWS, American)
- Edgar Martínez Award (Best designated hitter): Shohei Ohtani (LAA)
- Hank Aaron Award: Ronald Acuña Jr. (ATL, National); Shohei Ohtani (LAA, American)
- Roberto Clemente Award (Humanitarian): Aaron Judge (NYY)
- Mariano Rivera AL Reliever of the Year Award (Best AL reliever): Félix Bautista (BAL)
- Trevor Hoffman NL Reliever of the Year Award (Best NL reliever): Devin Williams (MIL)
- Heart & Hustle Award: Marcus Semien (TEX)
- Warren Spahn Award (Best left-handed pitcher): Blake Snell (SD)

Fielding Bible Awards
Position	Player
Pitcher	Zack Greinke (KC)
Catcher	Gabriel Moreno (AZ)
1st Base	Christian Walker (AZ)
2nd Base	Andrés Giménez (CLE)
3rd Base	Ke'Bryan Hayes (PIT)
Shortstop	Dansby Swanson (CHC)
Left Field	Steven Kwan (CLE)
Center Field	Kevin Kiermaier (TOR)
Right Field	Fernando Tatís Jr. (SD)
Multi-position	Mookie Betts (LAD)

=== Monthly awards ===
==== Player of the Month ====
Month	American League	National League
April	Matt Chapman	Ronald Acuña Jr.
May	Aaron Judge	Freddie Freeman
June	Shohei Ohtani	Ronald Acuña Jr.
July	Shohei Ohtani	Cody Bellinger
August	Julio Rodríguez	Mookie Betts
September	Yordan Alvarez	Ronald Acuña Jr.

==== Rookie of the Month ====
Month	American League	National League
April	Josh Jung	James Outman
May	Josh Jung	Spencer Steer
June	Gunnar Henderson	Corbin Carroll
July	Triston Casas	Francisco Álvarez
August	Zack Gelof	James Outman
September	Royce Lewis	Nolan Jones

==== Pitcher of the Month ====
Month	American League	National League
April	Gerrit Cole	Clayton Kershaw
May	Nathan Eovaldi	Michael Wacha
June	James Paxton	Blake Snell
July	Tyler Glasnow	Corbin Burnes
August	Cole Ragans	Freddy Peralta
September	Tarik Skubal	Blake Snell

==== Reliever of the Month ====
Month	American League	National League
April	Félix Bautista	Josh Hader
May	Alex Lange	Camilo Doval
June	Félix Bautista	Craig Kimbrel
July	Félix Bautista	Devin Williams
August	Andrés Muñoz	Raisel Iglesias
September	Clay Holmes	Tanner Scott

== Home field attendance and payroll ==
Team name	Wins	%±	Home attendance	%±	Per game	Est. payroll	%±
Los Angeles Dodgers	100	−9.9%	3,837,079	−0.6%	47,371	$227,091,667	−13.1%
San Diego Padres	82	−7.9%	3,271,554	9.5%	40,390	$236,200,139	36.1%
New York Yankees	82	−17.2%	3,269,016	4.2%	40,358	$259,417,008	8.6%
St. Louis Cardinals	71	−23.7%	3,241,091	−2.4%	40,013	$174,086,450	11.0%
Atlanta Braves	104	3.0%	3,191,505	2.0%	39,401	$194,197,500	7.2%
Philadelphia Phillies	90	3.4%	3,052,605	34.1%	37,686	$241,362,606	15.2%
Houston Astros	90	−15.1%	3,052,347	13.5%	37,683	$240,388,766	45.9%
Toronto Blue Jays	89	−3.3%	3,021,904	13.9%	37,307	$211,190,269	22.3%
Chicago Cubs	83	12.2%	2,775,149	6.1%	34,261	$162,918,250	24.3%
Seattle Mariners	88	−2.2%	2,690,418	17.6%	33,215	$128,155,663	63.7%
Boston Red Sox	78	0.0%	2,672,130	1.8%	32,989	$181,282,500	−3.8%
Los Angeles Angels	73	0.0%	2,640,575	7.5%	32,600	$218,537,055	30.8%
Colorado Rockies	59	−13.2%	2,607,935	0.4%	32,197	$155,645,682	38.2%
New York Mets	75	−25.7%	2,573,555	0.3%	31,772	$208,427,344	−13.3%
Milwaukee Brewers	92	7.0%	2,551,347	5.3%	31,498	$138,288,760	7.7%
Texas Rangers	90	32.4%	2,533,044	25.9%	31,272	$248,537,867	106.8%
San Francisco Giants	79	−2.5%	2,500,153	0.7%	30,866	$177,920,416	20.3%
Cincinnati Reds	82	32.3%	2,038,302	46.0%	25,164	$77,877,833	−30.4%
Minnesota Twins	87	11.5%	1,974,124	9.6%	24,372	$137,798,640	24.4%
Arizona Diamondbacks	84	13.5%	1,961,182	22.2%	24,212	$115,247,571	46.1%
Baltimore Orioles	101	21.7%	1,936,798	41.5%	23,911	$82,758,114	72.4%
Washington Nationals	71	29.1%	1,865,832	−7.9%	23,035	$99,211,578	−20.7%
Cleveland Guardians	76	−17.4%	1,834,068	41.5%	22,643	$70,114,729	6.3%
Chicago White Sox	61	−24.7%	1,669,628	−16.9%	20,613	$140,725,951	−16.0%
Pittsburgh Pirates	76	22.6%	1,630,624	29.7%	20,131	$72,407,500	90.9%
Detroit Tigers	78	18.2%	1,612,876	2.4%	19,912	$119,236,836	1.3%
Tampa Bay Rays	99	15.1%	1,440,301	27.7%	17,781	$75,441,212	3.3%
Kansas City Royals	56	−13.8%	1,307,052	2.3%	16,136	$88,186,975	0.9%
Miami Marlins	84	21.7%	1,162,819	28.1%	14,356	$114,351,500	67.7%
Oakland Athletics	50	−16.7%	832,352	5.6%	10,276	$51,230,000	2.0%

== Uniforms ==
=== Wholesale changes ===
- Starting with this season, all Major League teams are limited to four uniform options plus a City Connect uniform. The four uniform options include a home, away, and two alternate uniforms. This excludes throwback and special uniforms that were worn for only one game.
- The Diamondbacks retired their primary white home uniform without teal elements and replaced it with the alternate teal-trimmed white uniform to comply with the new 4+1 rule.
- For the 2023 season only, the Marlins announced they would wear their 1993 throwback home uniforms and teal caps for Friday home games, excluding Lou Gehrig and Roberto Clemente Day, in celebration of the franchise's 30th anniversary. The throwbacks would serve as the team's second alternate uniform alongside the black alternate as part of Nike's 4+1 rule.
- The Twins have made changes to their logo and their uniforms, including a home white set, a primary road gray set with pinstripes, and two new alternate jerseys, one navy blue and one cream, the latter which features "Twin Cities" across the chest for the first time in franchise history.
- The Royals added powder blue pants to wear with the powder blue uniforms in select games.
- Due to the aforementioned limit on team uniforms, the Mariners retired the gray road uniform and promoted their navy blue tops with gray pants as the primary road uniform. On games where the home team wears a navy alternate, the Mariners would don their Northwest Green alternates.
- The Rangers retired the red alternate home uniform due to the aforementioned uniform limit.
- The Rays retired the gray road uniform and promoted their navy blue tops with gray pants as their primary road uniform; the Columbia blue alternate tops would be worn if the opposing home team wears black or navy blue uniforms. The 1998 Devil Rays throwback home uniform was promoted to a second alternate, to be used on Friday home games.

=== City Connect uniforms ===
Six additional teams unveiled new City Connect uniforms during the season.

- The Braves' City Connect uniform featured a modified version of the team's 1974 home uniform, including "The A" script on the left chest and white-paneled blue caps with the blue "A". This uniform paid homage to Hank Aaron's historic 715th home run during the season.
- The Rangers' City Connect uniform featured a mythical-like creature titled a Peagle, which represents the metro area's two minor league baseball teams before the arrival of the team, the Fort Worth Panthers and the Dallas Eagles. Along with the Peagle, the uniform also features a typographic "TX" on the hat and across the chest, as this is similar to the uniform of the Eagles.
- The Mariners' City Connect uniform featured a patch on the jersey sleeve featuring Mount Rainier, as well as the letters "PNW", an acronym for Pacific Northwest. The uniform also features the colors of Amarillo, Rush Blue, and Sundown, representing the inaugural colors of the team, as well as the word "Seattle" across the chest in the lettering style of the city's first Major League Baseball team, the Seattle Pilots.
- The Reds' City Connect uniform features a diamond-shaped "C" on the cap and the jersey sleeve. It also features the word "CINCY" (short for Cincinnati) across the chest. On the collar of the jersey, it features an Ohio Buckeye and the motto of Cincinnati, "Juncta Juvant" ("Strength in Unity" in English).
- The Orioles' City Connect uniform features an italic "B" (commonly seen on the Orioles Road Jersey) on the cap and the sleeve of the jersey. For the jersey, it features the word "Baltimore" across the jersey. On the collar of the jersey, it features the colors and shapes of Baltimore's Neighborhoods.
- The Pirates' City Connect uniform features gold jerseys and black pants. The jersey features the abbreviation "PGH" across the chest with a checkered pattern influenced by the city seal that contains the symbols of an inverted "Y", representing the three rivers that meet in Pittsburgh (Allegheny, Monongahela, and Ohio), and the asteroid, or the diamond star shape, taken from the famous "Steelmark" logo.

=== Uniform advertisements ===
Starting with this season, teams may add advertisement patches to their uniforms. The following teams have announced their uniform advertisements:

- Arizona Diamondbacks: Avnet
- Atlanta Braves: Quikrete
- Boston Red Sox: MassMutual
- Cincinnati Reds: Kroger
- Cleveland Guardians: Marathon Petroleum
- Detroit Tigers: Meijer
- Houston Astros: Occidental Petroleum (OXY)
- Los Angeles Angels: Foundation Building Materials (FBM)
- Miami Marlins: ADT Inc.
- Milwaukee Brewers: Northwestern Mutual
- New York Mets: NewYork-Presbyterian Hospital
- New York Yankees: Starr Insurance
- San Diego Padres: Motorola
- San Francisco Giants: Cruise
- St. Louis Cardinals: Stifel
- Toronto Blue Jays: Toronto-Dominion Bank

=== Throwbacks ===
The Padres wore 1948 Pacific Coast League (PCL) throwbacks on April 17 in honor of Johnny Ritchey, who integrated the PCL.

The Pirates wore Homestead Grays throwbacks on August 13 in the second game of a doubleheader.

The Giants wore San Francisco Sea Lions throwbacks on August 26.

The Astros and the Royals wore Negro Leagues throwbacks on September 16. The Astros wore uniforms of the 1950 Houston Eagles, and the Royals wore Kansas City Monarchs uniforms.

=== Other uniforms ===
All teams and umpires wore #42 on April 15, the 76th anniversary of Jackie Robinson's debut in the majors. For the second consecutive year, all teams wore the #42 in Dodger Blue font. Players who normally wear their number on the front did not have them.

=== Anniversaries and special events ===
Team	Special occasion
All teams	Jackie Robinson Day (April 15)
All teams	Pink Ribbons for breast cancer awareness (May 14, Mother's Day)
All teams	Patch for Armed Forces Day (May 20) and Camouflage Caps for Armed Forces Day Weekend (May 19–21)
All teams	Poppy for Memorial Day (May 29)
All teams	"4–ALS" patch for Lou Gehrig Day (June 2)
All teams	"Play Ball" patch in partnership with USA Baseball and USA Softball (June 9–11)
All teams	Blue Ribbons for prostate cancer (June 18, Father's Day)
All teams	Gold Ribbons for childhood cancer (September 3)
All teams	#21 patch for Roberto Clemente day (September 15)
All teams	"MLB Debut" patch for players who play their first Major League game
Arizona Diamondbacks	25th Anniversary season
Baltimore Orioles	40th Anniversary of 1983 World Series championship
Baltimore Orioles	#5 patch in memory of Brooks Robinson (since September 27)
Boston Red Sox	120th Anniversary of 1903 World Series championship
Boston Red Sox	105th Anniversary of 1918 World Series championship
Boston Red Sox	10th Anniversary of 2013 World Series championship
Boston Red Sox	5th Anniversary of 2018 World Series Championship
Cincinnati Reds	20th Anniversary of Great American Ball Park
Cleveland Guardians	Memorial Patch of Longtime fan John Adams (April 7, August 24)
Colorado Rockies	30th Anniversary season
Detroit Tigers	Final season of slugger Miguel Cabrera
Houston Astros	2022 World Series championship (March 30)
Los Angeles Dodgers	35th Anniversary of 1988 World Series championship
Miami Marlins	20th Anniversary of 2003 World Series championship
Miami Marlins	30th Anniversary season
New York Yankees	25th Anniversary of 1998 World Series championship
New York Yankees	45th Anniversary of 1978 World Series championship
New York Yankees	100th Anniversary of the opening of original Yankee Stadium
Oakland Athletics	50th Anniversary of 1973 World Series championship
Oakland Athletics	"SAL" patch in memory of Sal Bando (white jersey only) (since May 15)
Oakland Athletics	"VIDA" patch in memory of Vida Blue (white jersey only) (since May 15)
Philadelphia Phillies	15th Anniversary of 2008 World Series championship
St. Louis Cardinals	#42 patch in memory of Bruce Sutter
San Francisco Giants	#36 patch in memory of Gaylord Perry
San Francisco Giants	#14 patch in memory of Vida Blue (since May 15)
Seattle Mariners	2023 MLB All-Star Game
Tampa Bay Rays	25th Anniversary season
Toronto Blue Jays	30th Anniversary of 1993 World Series championship
Washington Nationals	"TNL" patch in memory of owner Ted Lerner

== Broadcast rights ==
=== Television ===
==== National ====
This was the second year of the existing seven-year deals with ESPN, Fox, TBS, Apple TV+, and MLB Network; and the second year of a two-year deal with NBC Sports/Peacock:

===== Linear television =====
- Fox continued to air their Baseball Night in America slate of exclusive Saturday evening games beginning in May, along with Saturday afternoon games in April, and Thursday evening games in the latter part of the season where Saturday games would conflict with Fox's college football obligations. The network also aired the 2023 MLB All-Star Game. FS1 also broadcast non-exclusive games on Saturdays at times when no game was on the broadcast network, along with some irregularly scheduled weeknight games, mostly on Monday nights. Jason Benetti joined Fox as a play-by-play announcer, replacing Aaron Goldsmith. Derek Jeter joined Fox Sports as a studio analyst.
- TBS broadcast 26 MLB on TBS Tuesday Night games.
- ESPN broadcast Sunday Night Baseball, with the option to show alternate broadcasts. The package also included five additional national games, including one on Opening Day and the others as Wednesday Night Baseball, and the Home Run Derby. ESPN+ streamed daily games, but they were blacked out in the home markets of the teams playing.
- MLB Network broadcast games daily. While most games were simulcasts of the home teams' regional sports network broadcasts, select games were produced by the network under its MLB Network Showcase banner. All games were blacked out in the home markets of the teams playing.

===== Streaming =====
- Apple TV+ continued to hold the rights to Friday Night Baseball. Apple announced in March 2023 that they had signed a deal with DirecTV to distribute Friday Night Baseball to their commercial subscribers, ensuring availability to venues (such as bars and restaurants) that were not readily equipped to handle streaming-only broadcasts. Wayne Randazzo and Alex Faust were the new primary play-by-play commentators, replacing Melanie Newman and Stephen Nelson. Dontrelle Willis and Ryan Spilborghs were the new primary color commentators, replacing Katie Nolan, Hunter Pence, Hannah Keyser, and Chris Young.
- Peacock streamed 19 MLB Sunday Leadoff games on Sunday afternoons. Brendan Burke was the primary play-by-play announcer with Matt Vasgersian and Chris Vosters filling in. One game was simulcast on NBC.
- YouTube did not renew its deal for the MLB Game of the Week Live on YouTube. YouTube TV dropped MLB Network on February 1 in a carriage fee dispute.

===== Spanish language =====
- Fox Deportes broadcast Spanish-language simulcasts of 45 regular season games broadcast by Fox and FS1, as well as the All-Star Game.
- ESPN Deportes broadcast 25 Sunday Night Baseball as well as all other games broadcast by ESPN networks.

===== French language =====
- In Canada, TVA Sports became the new national French-language broadcaster of the league under a three-season deal, carrying a package of 78 regular season games, the All-Star Game, and the postseason. TVA has historically also held French-language rights to the Toronto Blue Jays sub-licensed from Sportsnet, from which the network has sub-contracted some of its sports rights.

==== Postseason ====
During the postseason, the ESPN networks (including ABC) broadcast all four Wild Card Series, with Spanish-language simulcasts on ESPN Deportes. TBS broadcast the National League Division Series and the National League Championship Series; TBS' postseason games were also made available on the streaming service Max's new Bleacher Report Sports Add-on tier which launched on October 5, and Spanish-language coverage was simulcast on MLB Network. Fox Sports broadcast the American League Division Series, the American League Championship Series, and the World Series, with games shown on Fox and FS1, with Spanish-language simulcasts on Fox Deportes.

==== Local ====
- In November 2022, Miami Marlins analyst J. P. Arencibia was released by Bally Sports.
- In December, Toronto Blue Jays color commentator Pat Tabler was released by Sportsnet. The network later announced that Buck Martinez would serve as the primary color commentator (paired with Dan Shulman), with Joe Siddall substituting on select series.
- In December, St. Louis Cardinals play-by-play announcer Dan McLaughlin was released by Bally Sports. The Cardinals later announced that Atlanta Braves play-by-play announcer Chip Caray would take over the same role with the team.
- In January 2023, former New York Mets radio voice Wayne Randazzo was announced as the new lead play-by-play announcer for the Los Angeles Angels on Bally Sports West, replacing Matt Vasgersian. Vasgersian and Patrick O'Neal will continue to serve as substitutes for selected games.
- In February, Brandon Gaudin was announced as the new play-by-play announcer for the Atlanta Braves on Bally Sports South and Bally Sports Southeast.
- In March, Pat Tabler was announced to join the Cleveland Guardians broadcasts on Bally Sports Great Lakes.
- On March 29, YES Network, the television home of the New York Yankees, launched an over-the-top subscription streaming platform that offers live streams of Yankees games without a cable subscription.
- On May 22, NBC Sports California fired Oakland Athletics television play-by-play announcer Glen Kuiper. Kuiper's last broadcast was a May 5 game at the Kansas City Royals, during which he unintentionally uttered a racial slur while on the air. Vince Cotroneo and Johnny Doskow have since shared play-by-play duties on the television booth to replace Kuiper.
- On July 25, Marquee Sports Network, the television home of the Chicago Cubs, launched an over-the-top subscription streaming platform that offers live streams of Cubs games without a cable subscription for $19.99 a month.

==== AT&T Sportsnet closure ====
On February 24, 2023, the AT&T SportsNet regional sports networks sent a letter to the Rockies, Astros, and Pirates saying they had until March 31, to reach an agreement to take their local television rights back. Warner Bros. Discovery (WBD), the owner of the networks, intends to leave the regional sports networks business. If a deal is not reached the networks will file for Chapter 7 bankruptcy. Root Sports Northwest is not affected because the Mariners already own majority control of that network. Warner Bros. Discovery and Major League Baseball quietly negotiated a deal to keep the remaining RSNs operational through the end of the season.

In August 2023, Boston Red Sox owner Fenway Sports Group announced its acquisition of AT&T SportsNet Pittsburgh from WBD via the co-owned Pittsburgh Penguins of the NHL, which subsequently re-launched as the NESN-operated SportsNet Pittsburgh in October. During the offseason, the Pittsburgh Pirates announced they would jointly own the network beginning on January 1, 2024. In September 2023, the Houston Astros and Houston Rockets jointly acquired WBD's stake in AT&T SportsNet Southwest. Both of those networks rebranded themselves to SportsNet Pittsburgh and the Space City Home Network, respectively, near the end of the regular season. However, with AT&T SportsNet Rocky Mountain failing to find new owners (either with the Colorado Rockies or some other professional sports team(s) in the area), SportsNet Rocky Mountain shut down services by October 21, 2023.

==== Diamond Sports bankruptcy ====
On February 15, 2023, Diamond Sports Group, owners of the Bally Sports regional sports networks, failed to make a $140 million interest payment and entered a 30-day grace period. On March 14, Diamond Sports officially filed for Chapter 11 Bankruptcy. Diamond had missed payments to the Diamondbacks, Rangers, Guardians, and Twins. Diamond also entered grace periods for their payments to the Padres and Reds, which they eventually made. On April 5, Major League Baseball filed an emergency motion asking the bankruptcy judge to order Diamond to pay the teams they missed payments to or give the media rights back to MLB. Diamond argued that due to the impact of cord-cutting, the contract rate for the media rights of the teams was too high. A hearing on the matter was set for May 31. As an interim, on April 19, the bankruptcy judge ordered Diamond Sports to pay 50% of what the Diamondbacks, Guardians, Twins, and Rangers are owed. On June 1, after a two-day long hearing, the bankruptcy judge ordered Diamond to pay the teams fully within five days.

On May 31, Diamond officially missed a second payment to the Padres, and the Padres' television rights were returned to Major League Baseball. Because Bally Sports San Diego, which aired Padres games, is a joint venture between the Padres and Diamond it is technically not in bankruptcy. Therefore, this missed payment did not have the same bankruptcy protections that Diamond's other missed payments had.

MLB Local Media—a new department led by former Fox Sports Networks executive Billy Chambers—took over production and distribution of Padres telecasts the same day; Padres games would be available locally via ad-hoc channels on participating television providers in the San Diego area, and via an over-the-top subscription service hosted by MLB.tv. The department had already worked with MLB Network staff to prepare for the possibility that it would have to take over a team's regional broadcasts on short notice, including preparing team-specific graphics packages and other elements in advance. Chambers' team was on standby in Miami for the Padres' series against the Marlins, focusing in particular on contingencies for the May 31 game based on the deadline, and having only 24 hours' notice of the missed payment on May 30. The MLB-produced telecasts inherited the Padres' existing broadcast team and other team-contracted staff. Once the team returned to San Diego, MLB Local Media inherited the mobile production units and freelance employees that had been used by Bally.

On June 22, Diamond Sports Group announced its intention to reject its contract with the Diamondbacks on June 30. Diamond and the Arizona Diamondbacks later released a joint statement pushing back the hearing to July 17 and agreeing to continue Bally Sports Arizona's broadcasts of Diamondbacks' games. On July 18, Diamond Sports officially rejected its contract with the Diamondbacks; MLB Local Media subsequently took over production of the team's telecasts in a similar arrangement to the Padres. After losing the rights earlier in the year to the Phoenix Suns and later in the year to the Arizona Coyotes to Gray Television and Scripps Sports respectively, Bally Sports Arizona began to wind down operations in October 2023, shutting down for good on October 21 that same year.

TV rights status for teams with a missed payment
Team	Payment(s) missed	Status
Cincinnati Reds	April 2023	Paid through 2023
Cleveland Guardians	April 2023	Paid through July
Arizona Diamondbacks	March 2023, July 2023	TV rights returned to MLB
Texas Rangers	April 2023	Paid through 2023
San Diego Padres	March 2023, May 2023	TV rights returned to MLB
Minnesota Twins	April 2023	Paid through 2023

=== Radio ===
==== National ====
- Jon Sciambi succeeded Dan Shulman as ESPN Radio's lead broadcaster, with Shulman now focusing primarily on his role at Sportsnet and the Toronto Blue Jays.

==== Local ====
- Play-by-play announcer Glenn Geffner was let go by the Miami Marlins.
- Steve Physioc retired from calling Kansas City Royals games and will be replaced by Jake Eisenberg.
- Wayne Randazzo stepped down as radio co-play-by-play announcer for the New York Mets. He was replaced by Keith Raad.
- Greg Schulte announced his retirement as the radio play-by-play announcer of the Arizona Diamondbacks. Schulte was the team's first radio announcer dating back to its 1998 expansion season.
- Jaime Jarrín retired from calling Los Angeles Dodgers games in Spanish after 64 seasons (1959–2022) and will be replaced by José Mota.
- Dave Wills died on March 5. He was the radio voice of the Tampa Bay Rays for 18 seasons. Wills was replaced by Neil Solondz.
- Bobby Scales and Cameron Maybin were added as analysts for select Detroit Tigers games on the radio; both took over full-time after long-time Tigers analyst and former catcher Jim Price died on August 7. Carlos Guillen, Barbaro Garbey, and Mari Montes will call Tigers games in Spanish.

== Retirements ==
The following players and coaches retired during the 2023 season and before the start of the 2024 campaign:

- Adam Wainwright – October 26, 2022 (announced); retired after the season
- Miguel Cabrera – November 28, 2022 (announced); retired after the season, joined Tigers front office
- Lorenzo Cain – March 7, 2023 (announced); retired as a Kansas City Royal on May 6
- A. J. Ladwig – March 31
- Brett Eibner – May 1
- Robinson Chirinos – May 3
- Matt Harvey – May 5
- Grayson Greiner – May 8
- Aníbal Sánchez – May 16
- Chad Pinder – May 28
- Adam Morgan – May 28
- Bartolo Colón – June 2 (announced); retired as a New York Met on September 17
- Seth Frankoff – June 9
- Adrián Sánchez – July 10
- Cole Hamels – August 4
- Craig Stammen – August 4
- José Bautista – August 11
- Daniel Murphy – August 15
- Adam Jones – August 25 (announced); retired as a Baltimore Oriole on September 15
- Sean Doolittle – September 22
- Tyler Clippard – September 28
- Terry Francona – September 30; retired at end of season
- Ryan Goins – October 9
- Trevor May – October 16
- Luis Avilán – October 20
- Dusty Baker – October 26
- Ian Kennedy – November 1
- Nelson Cruz – November 2 (announced); retired on November 8 after completing a tour of the five LIDOM stadiums in the Dominican Winter League
- Steven Brault – November 6
- Zack Britton – November 20
- Tommy Hunter – December 13
- Andrelton Simmons – December 26
- Michael Brantley – January 5, 2024
- Tony Wolters – January 21
- Collin McHugh – January 22
- Joe Smith – January 31
- Corey Kluber – February 9
- Eric Hosmer – February 21
- Brandon Dixon – February 29
- Josh Donaldson – March 4
- Mike Zunino – March 6
- Kole Calhoun – March 15

== Retired numbers ==
- Fernando Valenzuela had his No. 34 retired by the Los Angeles Dodgers on August 11. This was the 12th number retired by the team.
- Andruw Jones had his No. 25 retired by the Atlanta Braves on September 9. This was the 11th number retired by the team.

== See also ==
- 2023 in baseball
