= Siera Santos =

American sportscaster (born 1986)

- Born: June 10, 1986 (age 40); Phoenix, Arizona, U.S.
- Education: Arizona State University
- Occupation: TV host
- Employer(s): MLB Network; NHL Network

Siera Santos (born June 10, 1986) is an American sportscaster. She is an MLB Network personality who was hired to be one of the hosts of Quick Pitch after Heidi Watney left. Santos has also been a fill-in host for Off Base, and is also an NHL Network personality who occasionally hosts On the Fly. In March 2023 Santos along with Ryan Dempster was named co-host of Intentional Talk with Kevin Millar.

== Early life and education ==
She grew up in Phoenix, Arizona. She admitted to being the bad kid and getting into trouble in high school and being sent to bad girl boot camp in Southern Utah. She credited sports for changing her life. She got her GED and went to Scottsdale Community College and later graduated from Arizona State University in Tempe, Arizona with honors majoring in broadcast journalism.

== Career ==
Santos got her start in Colorado Springs, Colorado at KOAA-TV then went KWTV in Oklahoma City, Oklahoma, and then KCBS-TV in Los Angeles, California. Santos worked in Chicago, Illinois for four and a half years from 2015 to 2020, first at NBC Sports Chicago and then for WFLD before going back home to Phoenix working at KSAZ-TV. While at NBC Sports Chicago, she served as the beat reporter for the Chicago White Sox, appearing on pregame, in-game and postgame during White Sox broadcasts. After the departures of Watney and Alexa Datt in 2022, Santos was one of the hires by the MLB Network. In 2023, she and Dempster replaced Stephen Nelson as Millar's co-hosts on Intentional Talk.

== Personal life ==
Santos is a fan of the Arizona Diamondbacks. One of her dogs is named Neil Diamond.
