= Intentional Talk =

2011 American television series

- Genre: Talk; Comedy
- Starring: Chris Rose; Kevin Millar; Stephen Nelson; Siera Santos; Ryan Dempster
- Opening theme: "How You Like Me Now?" by The Heavy (April 4, 2011-April 1, 2016) "Ladies and Gentlemen" by Saliva (April 4, 2016-March 26, 2019)
- Country of origin: United States
- No. of episodes: 575+

Production
- Production locations: Secaucus, New Jersey; Austin, Texas (select shows)
- Running time: 60 minutes (regular season); 30 minutes (off season)
- Production company: MLB Network

Original release
- Network: MLB Network (2011–present); ESPN2 (2017–2018)
- Release: April 4, 2011 – present

Intentional Talk is a sports talk show broadcast by MLB Network. Hosted by Kevin Millar, Ryan Dempster, and Siera Santos, the program features discussions on the developments in Major League Baseball. It is broadcast on weekdays, airing for an hour during the MLB season, and previously airing a shortened half-hour format during the offseason.

The program is usually broadcast from Studio 42 of MLB Network's studios in Secaucus, New Jersey.

== Format ==
The series features discussions of the "hot topics and events of the day with appearances by special guests from sports, entertainment, and pop culture", along with contributions via social media. It is usually broadcast from Studio 42 at MLB Network's studios in Secaucus, New Jersey, although some episodes are broadcast remotely from the hosts' homes, or on-location from MLB and college ballparks.

== History ==
The series was announced by MLB Network as one of two new studio programs for the 2011 season, with former player Kevin Millar and sportscaster Chris Rose serving as its initial co-hosts.

In April 2017, after the cancellation of the daily edition of ESPN's studio show Baseball Tonight, it was announced that ESPN2 had picked up Intentional Talk for its weekday lineup. Episodes premiered at 4 p.m. ET beginning May 1, 2017, and the program would still air on MLB Network in its existing 5 p.m. ET time slot. In December 2018, four months before the deal to air Intentional Talk was to end in April 2019, the show stopped airing on ESPN2.

On December 11, 2020, Rose announced that he had not renewed his contract with MLB Network, and would leave the network and Intentional Talk on December 23, 2020. In March 2021, it was announced that Stephen Nelson would succeed Rose as co-host.

In January 2023, Nelson stepped down from the show after being named an alternate play-by-play announcer for the Los Angeles Dodgers. The program expanded to a three-host panel for the new season, with Millar joined by MLB Network anchor Siera Santos, and Ryan Dempster—who had been a former teammate of Millar with the Florida Marlins. Millar suggested Dempster as a co-host because of their similar but contrasting personalities, explaining that "he's a comedian. He's a card shark. He's that kind of a skit guy. I'm the loud guy saying everything that everybody's thinking. I’m not a guy that can walk around the showers naked. I'm a guy who's going to go to the shower with my towel on, and Ryan would be the guy to go do a funny naked joke."

On the October 18, 2026 episode, Santos, Dempster, and Millar announced that Intentional Talk had been cancelled and would conclude on November 4, 2026, after a 16-year run. However, on the day of the final episode, The Athletic reported that MLB Network had reversed the decision and reinstated Intentional Talk, following calls to save the show by viewers, players, as well as top MLB executives such as commissioner Rob Manfred. The hosts confirmed the renewal during the ensuing episode.

== Personalities ==
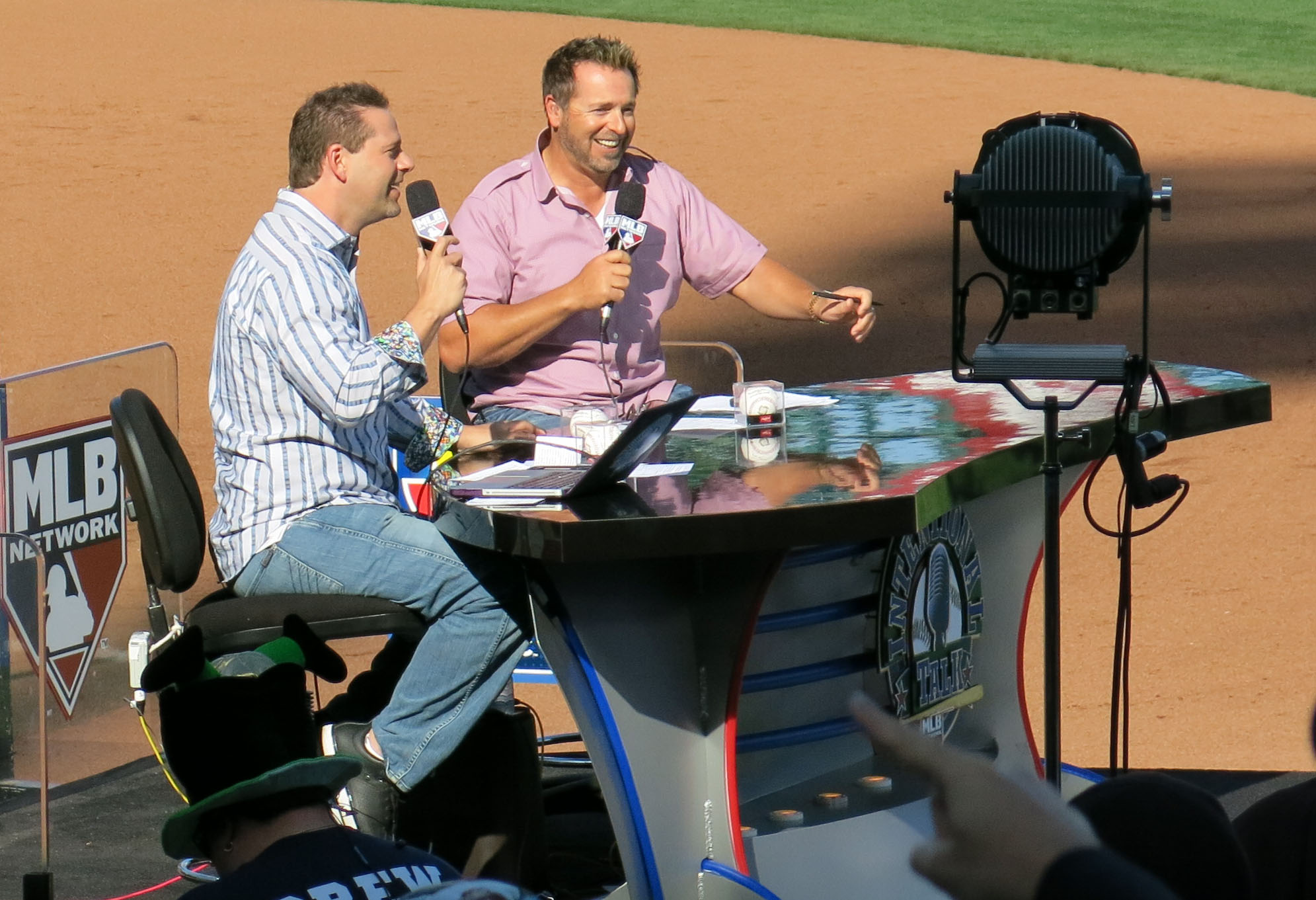
Kevin Millar and Chris Rose hosting Intentional Talk on-location from the 2013 World Baseball Classic in San Francisco.

=== Hosts ===
- Chris Rose (2011–2020)
- Kevin Millar (2011–present)
- Stephen Nelson (2021–2023)
- Siera Santos (2023–present)
- Ryan Dempster (2023–present)

=== Reporters ===
- Hazel Mae (2011)
- Alanna Rizzo (2012–2013)
- Kristina Fitzpatrick (2014)
- Heidi Watney (2015–2021)
- Scott Braun (2017–2022)

== Reception ==
Intentional Talk has been one of MLB Network's longest-running and most-popular series; its popularity among MLB players in particular has been credited to its 5 p.m. ET time slot, meaning that it is often seen in clubhouses before 7 p.m. ET games.

Chad Jennings of The Athletic wrote in 2023 that Intentional Talk made Millar one of MLB Network's "most enduring and consistent stars", with his original pairing with Kevin Rose having helped it establish a "casual-but-passionate" tone. He similarly noted Millar and Dempster's chemistry as former teammates; "they poke fun at themselves, make fun of one another, and never run out of material".
