= Kevin Millar =

American baseball player (born 1971)

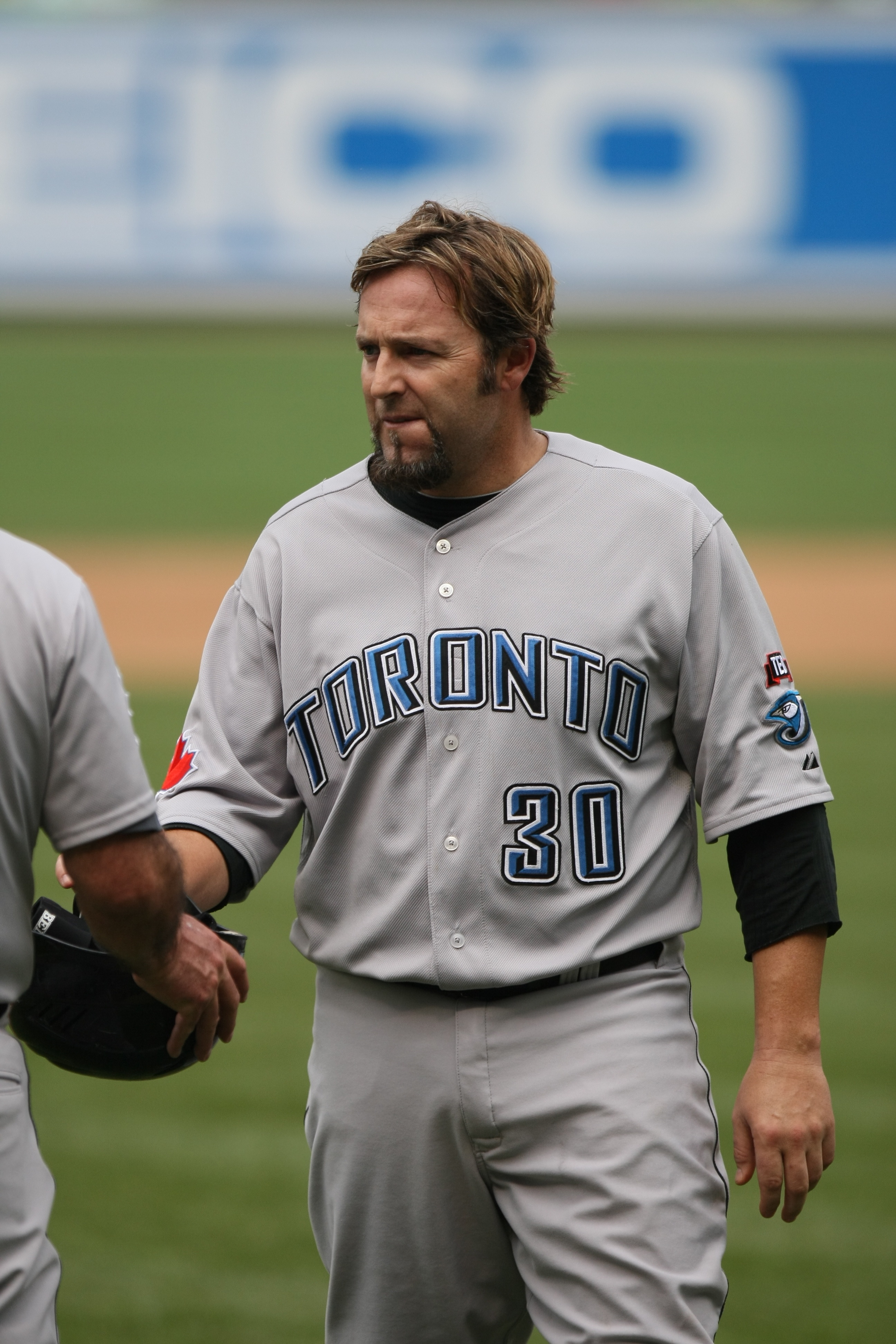
- Millar with the Toronto Blue Jays in 2009
- First baseman / Outfielder
- Born: September 24, 1971 (age 55); Los Angeles, California, U.S.
- Batted: Right Threw: Right

MLB debut
- April 11, 1998, for the Florida Marlins

Last MLB appearance
- October 3, 2009, for the Toronto Blue Jays

MLB statistics
- Batting average: .274
- Home runs: 170
- Runs batted in: 699
- Stats at Baseball Reference

Teams
- Florida Marlins (1998–2002); Boston Red Sox (2003–2005); Baltimore Orioles (2006–2008); Toronto Blue Jays (2009)

Career highlights and awards
- World Series champion (2004)

Kevin Charles Millar (/mɪˈlɑːr/; born September 24, 1971) is an American former professional baseball first baseman and outfielder who played in Major League Baseball (MLB) and is a current analyst for MLB Network and NESN. He played in MLB for the Florida Marlins, Boston Red Sox, Baltimore Orioles, and Toronto Blue Jays from 1998 through 2009. He is currently a host along with Siera Santos and Ryan Dempster on the MLB Network show Intentional Talk, and (as of March 2018) the show's companion audio podcast Intentional Talk: Caught Listening.

== Early life ==
Millar was born in Los Angeles. He played baseball for University High School in West Los Angeles, which won the 3-A City title in 1988 under coach Frank Cruz, during his junior year. He graduated from Hart High School in Santa Clarita, California. He attended and played college baseball for Los Angeles City College and later Lamar University in Beaumont, Texas. Under the tutelage of Coach Jim Gilligan, Millar and the Cardinals prospered. For two seasons, Millar was a key part of Lamar's return to prominence in collegiate baseball. In 1992, Lamar went 32–21, posting the NCAA's biggest turnaround with a 14-victory improvement over the 1991 season. Millar led the Cardinals that season in runs (41), hits (56), home runs (13) and runs batted in (50), and he earned All-Sun Belt Conference honors. After the 1992 season, he played collegiate summer baseball with the Harwich Mariners of the Cape Cod Baseball League.

The next season, Millar helped lead the Cardinals to a 44–18 record, to the SBC regular-season and tournament championships, and also to a berth in the NCAA's Central I Regional on the campus of Texas A&M in College Station. Lamar would be quickly eliminated in two games, with a 6–1 loss against UCLA, followed by a 10-5 finish against Texas A&M.

== Professional career ==
In 1993, Millar began his professional career with the Saint Paul Saints of the Northern League. He batted .260 with five home runs and 30 RBI in 63 games. On September 20, 1993, Millar's contract was purchased by the Florida Marlins.

=== Replacement player ===
Millar was a replacement player during the 1994–95 Major League Baseball strike, when he played during spring training in 1995; therefore, he is barred from membership in the Major League Baseball Players Association (MLBPA).

=== Florida Marlins (1998–2002) ===
From 1997 to 1999, during games encompassing several minor league stints, Millar set the record for most consecutive games reaching base with 71 (although this statistic only began to be formally tracked in the minors in 1996). This record was tied in 2003 by future Red Sox teammate Kevin Youkilis. Millar's contract was purchased by the Marlins at the start of the 1998 season and he made his major league debut for Florida on April 11, 1998, against the Pittsburgh Pirates, finishing the game 1-for-2 with a walk after appearing as a pinch hitter in the sixth inning. The Marlins went on to lose the game, 7–6. He would appear in only one more game before spending the rest of the season in the minor leagues with the Triple-A Charlotte Knights, where he batted .326 with four home runs and 15 RBI. Millar played with the Marlins until the end of the 2002 season.

=== Boston Red Sox (2003–2005) ===
After the 2002 season, the Marlins sold Millar to the Chunichi Dragons of the Japanese Central League. In order for the transaction to be completed, he first had to clear the waivers requested by the Marlins, but the Red Sox broke an unwritten rule and blocked the deal with a waiver claim. Millar had signed a two-year, $5.2 million contract with the Dragons in January 2003, but in an unprecedented deal brokered by MLB, the Marlins later repaid the money that the Dragons had paid for Millar, and the Red Sox paid a similar sum to the Marlins in return for Millar. On February 15, 2003, Millar was officially traded to the Red Sox. His clubhouse presence and offensive production helped spark the Red Sox to the 2003 American League Championship Series and the 2004 World Series.

During the 2003 playoffs, Millar began using the phrase "Cowboy Up", and in 2004 referred to his team as "idiots" to keep teammates loose during the stretch run to the World Series Championship.

Millar had a lead-off walk in the ninth inning of Game 4 of the 2004 ALCS against the Yankees, which, along with Dave Roberts' steal of second base that inning and an RBI single by Bill Mueller, proved to be the turning point in the series. Prior to the game, Millar was caught on camera numerous times telling reporters and his teammates "Don't let the Sox win tonight", in reference to Game 4 and in reference to the fact that Pedro Martínez and Curt Schilling were scheduled as the starting pitchers Games 5 and 6, respectively.

On April 20, 2012, Millar, together with Pedro Martínez, gave a toast to Fenway Park on the 100th anniversary of the ballpark. Millar and Martinez stood on top of the home dugout and gave a toast that was the largest in history, according to the Guinness Book of World Records.

=== Baltimore Orioles (2006–2008) ===
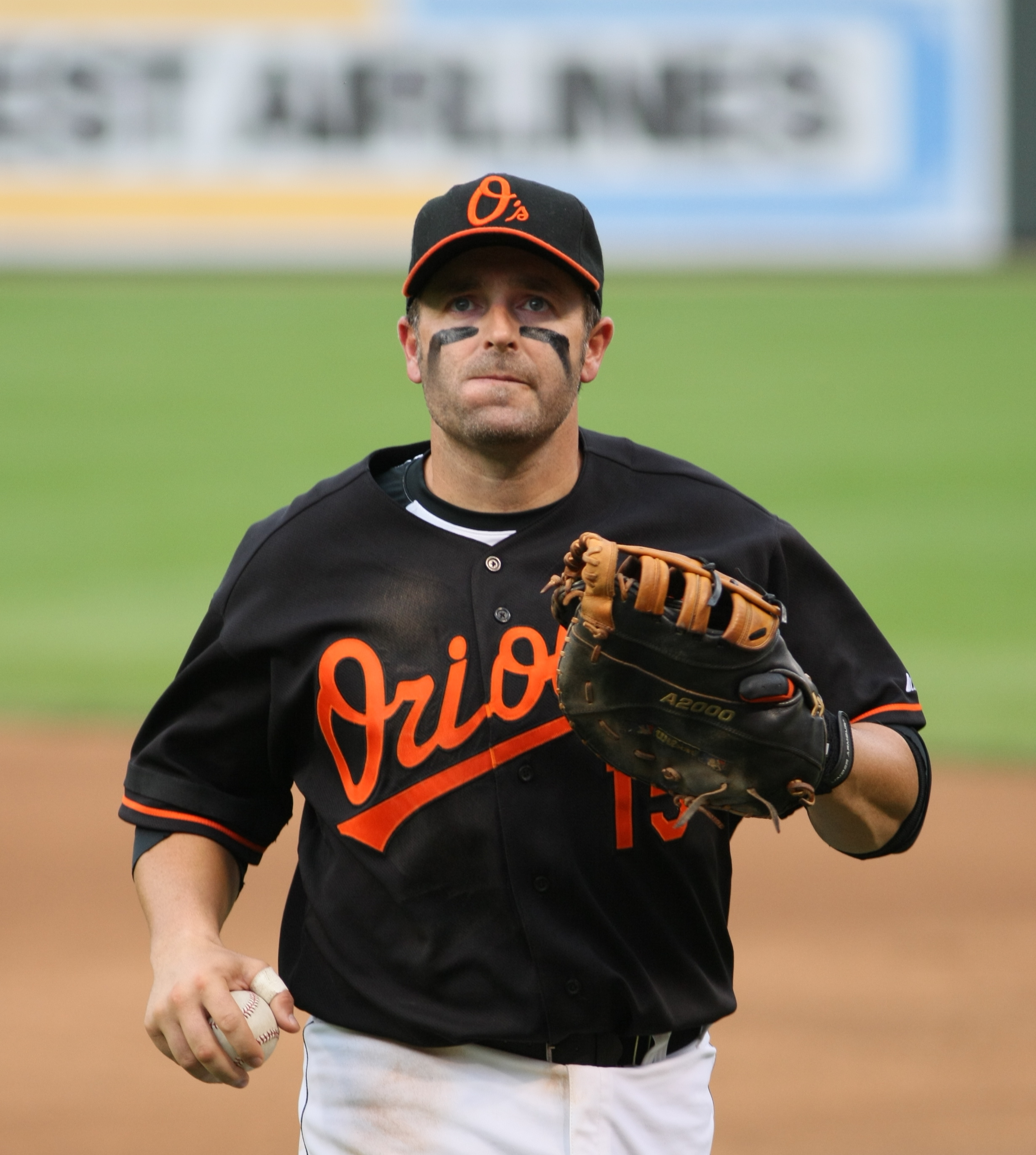
Millar on September 13, 2008.

Millar signed a one-year, $2.1 million contract with the Baltimore Orioles on January 12, 2006. During the season, he broke Rey Ordóñez's record for most games played by any non-drafted player who started his career in the Independent Leagues during the Draft era. He finished his first season in Baltimore with a .272 average, 15 home runs, and 64 RBI in 132 games. After the season, Millar re-signed with the Orioles on a one-year, $2.75 million contract on December 2, 2006. The deal also included an option for the 2008 season.

Initially in Baltimore, he was not an everyday player. However, when Dave Trembley took over the team, he began to play more regularly.

On August 23, 2007, Millar reached base safely for the 50th consecutive game, setting a franchise record for the Orioles. On August 26, 2007, Millar's streak came to an end at 52 games. It was the seventh-longest streak since 1957.

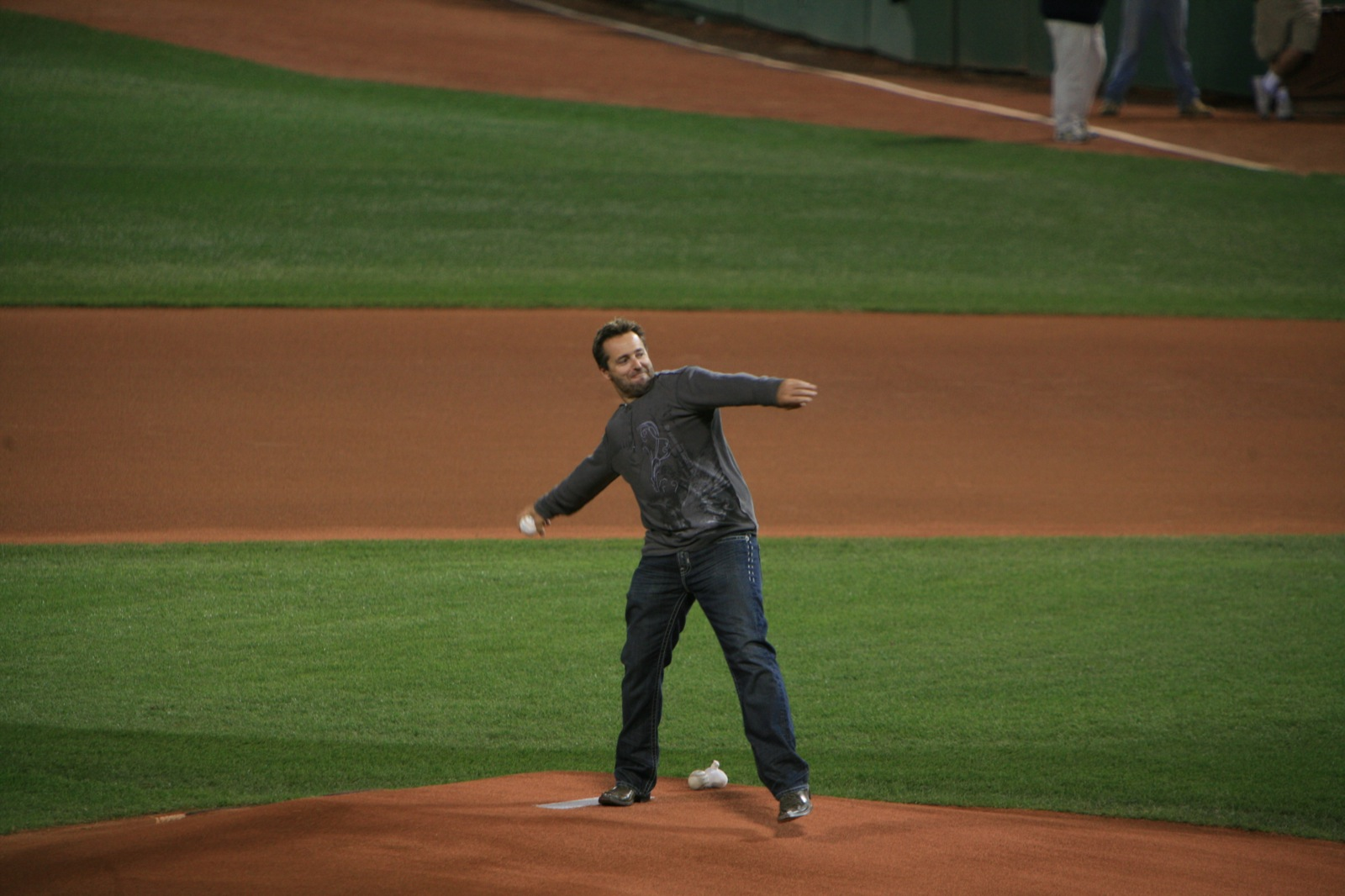
Millar throwing the ceremonial first pitch for Game 7 of the 2007 American League Championship Series

=== Toronto Blue Jays (2009) ===
On February 11, 2009, Millar signed a minor league deal with the Toronto Blue Jays as a non-roster invitee. He successfully made the roster, serving as a backup to first baseman Lyle Overbay.

After Alex Ríos was claimed off waivers, Millar switched his number from #30 to his former #15.

=== Chicago Cubs (2010) ===
On February 1, 2010, Millar agreed to a minor league contract with the Chicago Cubs, with an invitation to spring training. However, on March 30, he was released by the Cubs after not making the major league team.

=== First retirement ===
Millar announced his retirement on April 21, 2010, though on April 27 on MLB Network Radio with Jim Duquette and Kevin Kennedy, he stated it was not official as he still wanted to play. Millar joined MLB Network as a studio analyst. On May 20, 2010, Millar also joined New England Sports Network (NESN) as a pregame and postgame analyst. On May 22, Millar made his debut for Fox Sports and its MLB on Fox Saturday telecasts. He served as a pregame, game break, and postgame analyst for its primetime games in the studio, as well as a fill-in color analyst for select games during the season.

=== Return to baseball (St. Paul Saints) ===
On May 5, 2010, Millar returned to baseball when he signed a contract with the St. Paul Saints of the American Association, the same team with which he started his career. His contract language also allowed him to leave the team to carry out his broadcasting duties. He played six games for the Saints in 2010, hitting .208 with no home runs and two RBIs.

On June 24, 2017, Millar was allowed a single at-bat for the Saints in a regular-season game versus the Winnipeg Goldeyes as part of a promotional night celebrating the Saints' 25th anniversary. Facing his first live pitching in seven years, Millar hit a two-run home run in the bottom of the second inning; the Saints went on to win the game, 8–6.

== Podcasting ==
In 2018, Millar and Chris Rose began co-hosting the audio podcast Intentional Talk: Caught Listening, produced by MLB Network.

== Awards ==
After the 2001 season, Millar was awarded the Charlie Hough Good Guy Award by the Florida chapter of the Baseball Writers' Association of America.

After the 2003 season, Millar was awarded the Jackie Jensen Award, which is presented each year by the Boston chapter of the BBWAA. The award is presented to the player who best exemplifies the spirit and desire of Jackie Jensen, the former Red Sox outfielder.

== Movie and television appearances ==
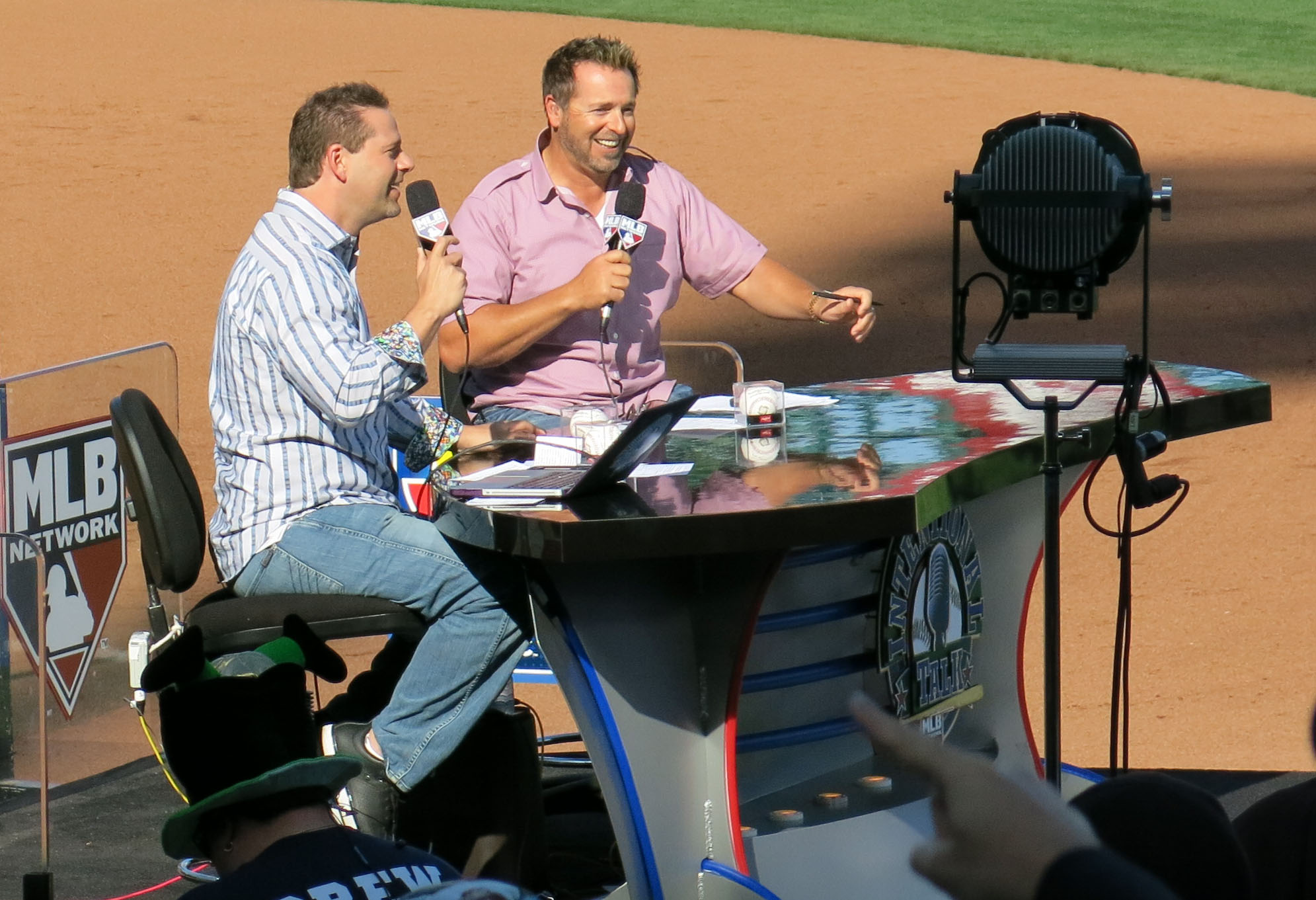
Chris Rose and Kevin Millar at the 2013 World Baseball Classic

Millar made an appearance (in actual game footage from Game 4 of the 2004 ALCS) in the movie Fever Pitch in which he walked and was lifted for a pinch runner, Dave Roberts, during the Red Sox rally in the bottom of the 9th inning.

Millar co-hosts the MLB Network show Intentional Talk with Siera Santos and Ryan Dempster. He repeatedly uses the phrase "Got heeeem" which has become a signature part of "Intentional Talk".

In 2022, Millar became a broadcaster and analyst for the Boston Red Sox on NESN. On August 21, 2023 Millar gained national recognition for calling Red Sox player Adam Duvall's three run home run and its location right before it occurred.

Millar voiced himself in "Abe League of Their Moe", a 2025 episode of The Simpsons.

== Personal life ==
Millar is married and has four children. He is the nephew of former major league outfielder Wayne Nordhagen.

== See also ==
- List of Major League Baseball replacement players
