= Lauren Gardner =

American sportscaster

- Born: September 6, 1985 (age 40); Denver, Colorado, U.S.
- Education: University of Colorado Boulder
- Occupation: Sportscaster
- Years active: 2007–present
- Employer(s): DAZN Group; MLB Network; NHL Network
- Website: Lauren Gardner on X

Lauren Gardner (born September 6, 1985) is an American sportscaster who is currently employed by Altitude Sports Network working on the Colorado Avalanche and Denver Nuggets Broadcasts as well as hosting various other programs. Gardner was formerly with MLB Network, NHL Network, and AppleTV.

== Sportscasting career ==
Gardner interned at FOX Sports Rocky Mountain and Mile High Sports magazine. She has served as a sideline reporter and host for CBS Sports Network, Fox Sports Ohio, MTV2, Smithsonian Channel, and Altitude Sports and Entertainment, where she covered the NFL, NHL, NBA, MLB, college football, and college basketball. She has also hosted numerous programs including pre and post-game shows, red carpet events, fantasy football programming, and even the documentary series Sports Detectives.

Gardner joined the MLB and NHL networks in the spring of 2019. With them, she has hosted various programs including Quick Pitch, On the Fly, and NHL Tonight. She has also reported on numerous events around both leagues. Gardner, along with Melanie Newman who did the play-by-play, Sarah Langs, Alanna Rizzo who was the sideline reporter, and Heidi Watney, was a part of an all-female broadcast team who called the Baltimore Orioles vs. Tampa Bay Rays game on July 20, 2021, for YouTube. In April of 2022, she became the host of a new MLB Network panel show, Off Base. In 2025, Off Base became a podcast show.

Gardner can also been seen as a host and reporter for boxing programming on DAZN, and is the host of the U.S. version of Born Fighter on Matchroom Boxing's YouTube channel.

== Personal life ==
Gardner grew up in Denver, Colorado and attended Northglenn High School. She was an All-Conference softball player and was captain of her high school dance team. Gardner graduated from the University of Colorado Boulder with a bachelor's degree in political science in 2007. She was a member of the Denver Broncos Cheerleaders from 2004 to 2009 and has a private pilot's license. She is a fan of the Denver Broncos, Colorado Avalanche and Colorado Rockies.
