= Off Base Podcast =

American baseball television program

- Genre: Baseball commentary
- Starring: Lauren Gardner; Xavier Scruggs
- Country of origin: United States
- Original language: English
- No. of seasons: 4

Production
- Running time: 30 minutes

Original release
- Network: MLB Network
- Release: April 11, 2022 – September 28, 2025

Off Base Podcast is an American baseball podcast show on MLB Network. The show aired every Sunday at 11:00 am ET during the Major League Baseball regular season and was hosted by Lauren Gardner and Xavier Scruggs. Off Base was a youth-oriented show featuring a segment highlighting the off-field fashion choices of MLB players and another segment dedicated to discussions about growing baseball's influence with younger audiences.

== History ==
Off Base was announced as an addition to MLB Network's programming in April 2022, just after the 2021–22 Major League Baseball lockout and prior to the start of the 2022 season. The show's direction was noted as being a part of MLB's efforts to address low viewership with younger audiences, particularly among Generation Z and Millennials. A poll conducted by Seton Hall University three months prior to the debut of the show found that MLB viewership was declining, particularly among younger fans.

Lauren Gardner, who has been an MLB Network personality since 2019, was tapped as the show's inaugural host. Former MLB first baseman Xavier Scruggs, baseball writer Hannah Keyser, and WFAN Radio sports radio host Keith McPherson joined the show as permanent analysts, with a fourth spot on the set left open for rotating guest analysts, which have included former MLB catcher Anthony Recker and actor Ellen Adair. The show debuted on April 11, 2022, from a new set at MLB Network's Studio 21 in Secaucus, New Jersey.

For the 2023 season, Keyser and McPherson's spots were vacated and left open for new rotating guest analysts, and the panel was joined by Yahoo! sports betting analyst Ariel Epstein. Then for the 2024 season, Yahoo! MLB insider Russell Dorsey joined the show as a regular guest.

For the 2025 season, the show became a once-weekly podcast show airing on Sunday mornings and hosted by Gardner and Scruggs, with the show's length cut down from one hour to a half-hour. The show was canceled following the 2025 season.
