= Xavier Scruggs =

American baseball player (born 1987)

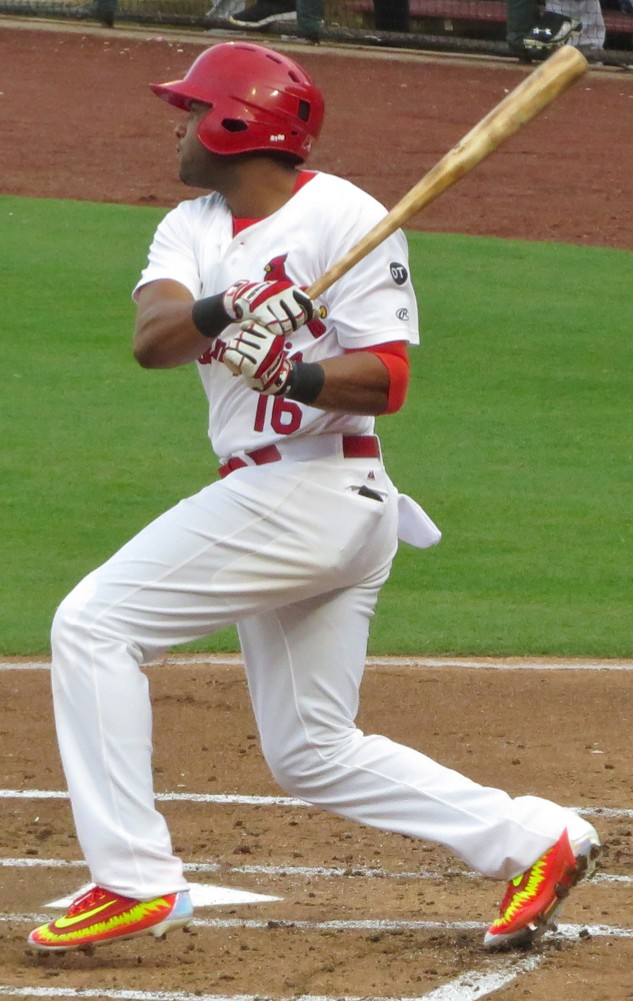
- Scruggs batting for the Memphis Redbirds in 2015
- First baseman
- Born: September 23, 1987 (age 39); Whittier, California, U.S.
- Batted: Right Threw: Right

Professional debut
- MLB: September 4, 2014, for the St. Louis Cardinals
- KBO: March 31, 2017, for the NC Dinos

Last appearance
- MLB: October 2, 2016, for the Miami Marlins
- KBO: October 13, 2018, for the NC Dinos

MLB statistics
- Batting average: .227
- Home runs: 1
- Runs batted in: 14

KBO statistics
- Batting average: .277
- Home runs: 61
- Runs batted in: 208
- Stats at Baseball Reference

Teams
- St. Louis Cardinals (2014–2015); Miami Marlins (2016); NC Dinos (2017–2018)

Xavier Ladel Scruggs (born September 23, 1987) is an American former professional baseball first baseman. He played in Major League Baseball (MLB) for the St. Louis Cardinals and Miami Marlins, and in the KBO League for the NC Dinos.

== Professional career ==
=== Early career ===
Scruggs attended Poway High School in Poway, California. The Seattle Mariners selected Scruggs in the 50th round of the 2005 Major League Baseball draft, but did not sign and attended the University of Nevada, Las Vegas (UNLV) to play college baseball for the UNLV Rebels. During his three years at UNLV he hit .328/.427/.652 with 34 home runs and 112 runs batted in (RBIs).

=== St. Louis Cardinals ===
After his junior year, the St. Louis Cardinals selected Scruggs in the 19th round of the 2008 draft. He signed with the Cardinals.

Scruggs called up to the majors for the first time on September 4, 2014. He made his major league debut that day, but his major league action in 2014 was brief. He started the next season at Memphis. After batting .274 with five home runs and 16 RBI in 17 games in April, he was named the Cardinals' organizations Player of the Month. The Cardinals recalled him from Memphis on June 19, 2015. Four days later against the Miami Marlins, he provided three hits and two RBI, including a game-tying double, in an eventual 4–3 win. Another three-hit, two-RBI effort followed on June 27 in an 8–1 win over the Chicago Cubs.

=== Miami Marlins ===
On November 30, 2015, Scruggs signed a minor league deal with the Miami Marlins. He was called up from Triple-A to play first base for the Marlins on August 19, 2016, and hit his first career homer, a 2-run shot off Pirates pitcher Chad Kuhl, in a 3-1 Marlins win on August 20. On October 24, he was outrighted off of the team’s 40-man roster.

=== NC Dinos ===
Scruggs signed a one-year, $1 million contract with the NC Dinos of the KBO League on December 26, 2016. He became a free agent following the 2018 season. In two years with the Dinos in the KBO, Scruggs hit 61 home runs and drove in 208 runs.

=== Leones de Yucatán ===
On June 17, 2019, Scruggs signed with the Leones de Yucatán of the Mexican League. He was released on December 5, 2019. In 57 games he hit .262/.362/.471 with 11 home runs, 31 RBIs and 1 stolen base.

== Post-baseball career ==
In April 2021, Scruggs joined the St. Louis Cardinals baseball operations team as the Diversity, Equity, and Inclusion Consultant. Scruggs has covered MLB for ESPN since 2021. He also covers the Little League World Series in South Williamsport, Pennsylvania, every August for ESPN. In April 2022, Scruggs was hired as an inaugural panelist for the MLB Network show Off Base. In August 2026, Scruggs began work as an announcer for the premier of immersive baseball broadcasts through Apple TV and the Apple Vision Pro. In September 2026, Scruggs appeared as a contestant on the first season of The Traitors: New Blood. He was "murdered" in Episode 3, finishing 20th out of 22 contestants.
