= Stephen Nelson (sportscaster) =

American sportscaster

- Born: Stephen Etsuo Nelson; March 8, 1989 (age 37)
- Education: Chapman University
- Occupation: Television broadcaster
- Spouse: Cori Coffin (m. 2018)
- Children: 2
- Sports commentary career
- Team: Los Angeles Dodgers (2023-present)
- Genre: Play-by-play
- Sports: MLB, NHL

Stephen Etsuo Nelson (born March 8, 1989) is an American sportscaster and play-by-play announcer who works for ESPN and the Los Angeles Dodgers of Major League Baseball.

== Early life and education ==
Nelson grew up in Southern California and attended Marina High School in Huntington Beach, California. He went on to attend Chapman University, where he majored in broadcast journalism. Nelson was the sports director for Chapman Radio, where he served as the lead play-by-play broadcaster for school sports games.

During his time at Chapman, Nelson interned for KTLA-TV and Fox Sports West. He also worked as a camera operator and in-game production assistant for the Anaheim Angels and Anaheim Ducks.

In 2011, Nelson graduated magna cum laude from Chapman.

== Career ==
After graduating from Chapman, Nelson worked as a multimedia broadcaster for the Rockford IceHogs during the 2011–12 season. Nelson hosted the pre- and post-game shows, as well as the intermission reports, in addition to filling in as a play-by-play broadcaster and color commentator.

From June 2012 to August 2014, Nelson was a sports reporter and anchor for KEZI-TV in Eugene, Oregon.

In August 2014, Nelson joined Bleacher Report as an on-air talent.

In March 2018, Nelson left Bleacher Report to join MLB Network and NHL Network. In March 2021, after MLB Network declined to renew Chris Rose’s contract, Nelson was named the new co-host of Intentional Talk alongside Kevin Millar.

In November 2021, Nelson served as the fill-in play-by-play commentator for three Chicago Blackhawks games on NBC Sports Chicago.

In 2022, Nelson became the primary play-by-play announcer for the MLB Network-produced Friday Night Baseball on Apple TV+.

On January 20, 2023, the Los Angeles Dodgers named Nelson to their broadcast team for games on SportsNet LA that are not broadcast by lead play-by-play announcer Joe Davis. Nelson called joining the Dodgers' broadcast team "a defining moment" in his career and personal, as he represents the Asian American Pacific Islander community in sports broadcasting. Upon joining the Dodgers, Nelson was the only Asian American play-by-play broadcaster working for a Major League team.

On November 11, 2023, Nelson joined ESPN as a SportsCenter anchor, based in Los Angeles, joining a rotation with Stan Verrett and Linda Cohn. This followed the departures of Neil Everett and Ashley Brewer.

== Personal life ==
Nelson is half-Japanese through his mother, Flo, and attended a Japanese school while growing up. Nelson introduced Shohei Ohtani in Japanese at the Commissioner’s Historic Achievement Award ceremony in October 2021.

Nelson is married to news anchor Cori Coffin.
