= Charlie Hough Good Guy Award =

Award in baseball journalism

The Charlie Hough Good Guy Award is presented by the Miami chapter of the Baseball Writers' Association of America. The members annually vote for this award. It was named after former Florida Marlins pitcher Charlie Hough who had a great relationship with the reporters.
