= Melanie Newman =

American sports broadcaster (born 1991)

Baltimore Orioles
- Broadcaster
- Born: Melanie Lynne Newman; May 27, 1991 (age 35)

Teams
- As Broadcaster: Frisco RoughRiders (2014–2018); Salem Red Sox (2019); Baltimore Orioles (2020–present); Apple TV+ (2022); BBC (2023–present)

Melanie Lynne Newman (born May 27, 1991) is an American radio and television play-by-play broadcaster and Studio Host for the Baltimore Orioles of Major League Baseball (MLB) and previously did national Friday Night Baseball broadcasts on Apple TV+. She is the first woman to be a play-by-play announcer for the Orioles and one of only a few female broadcasters who have done play-by-play announcing in MLB.

== Career ==
Newman began her broadcasting career while as a student at Troy University, where she majored in broadcast journalism. She was the play-by-play announcer for Troy's volleyball team, as well as calling baseball and softball games as a student. She graduated in 2013.

She called games in Minor League Baseball for several years, including at High-A and Double-A. Newman worked as a sideline reporter for Fox Sports Southwest and served as play-by-play announcer for the Frisco RoughRiders. In 2019, she joined Suzie Cool as part of the first all-female broadcast team in professional baseball when she served as play-by-play broadcaster for the Salem Red Sox.

In 2020, the Orioles announced that Newman had joined their broadcast team. The COVID-19 pandemic delayed the start of the MLB season, and so she made her debut on August 4, 2020, becoming the first woman to ever call a regular-season Orioles game when she was part of the radio broadcast team. Newman also served as a sideline reporter and a studio host for Orioles' television broadcasts. On July 20, 2021, Newman was the play-by-play announcer as part of the first all-female broadcast team, who called the Baltimore Orioles vs. Tampa Bay Rays game for YouTube.

On September 29, 2021, Newman teamed with Jessica Mendoza to call a game between the Los Angeles Dodgers and San Diego Padres for ESPN. It marked the first time that an all-female broadcast team called a nationally televised Major League Baseball game.

For the 2022 MLB season, Newman was a play-by-play announcer for Apple TV+ Friday Night Baseball.

In 2023, Newman was one of three commentators for the BBC's coverage of MLB's London Series.

On September 8, 2024, Newman was half of the ROKU Sunday Leadoff baseball broadcast booth between the Tampa Bay Rays and Baltimore Orioles.

== Personal life ==
Newman grew up in Woodstock, Georgia.
