= 2022 Major League Baseball season =

2022 MLB season
- League: Major League Baseball
- Sport: Baseball
- Duration: April 7 – November 5, 2022
- Games: 162
- Teams: 30
- TV partner(s): Fox/FS1; TBS; ESPN/ABC; MLB Network
- Streaming partner(s): Apple TV+ Peacock; YouTube

Draft
- Top draft pick: Jackson Holliday
- Picked by: Baltimore Orioles

Regular season
- Season MVP: NL: Paul Goldschmidt (STL); AL: Aaron Judge (NYY)

Postseason
- AL champions: Houston Astros
- AL runners-up: New York Yankees
- NL champions: Philadelphia Phillies
- NL runners-up: San Diego Padres

World Series
- Champions: Houston Astros
- Runners-up: Philadelphia Phillies
- World Series MVP: Jeremy Peña (HOU)

MLB seasons
- ← 2021 2023 →

Locations of AL teams for the 2022–2024 MLB seasons
West Central East
Locations of NL teams for the 2017–present MLB seasons
West Central East

The 2022 Major League Baseball season (MLB) was originally scheduled to begin on March 31 and end on October 2. The 2021–22 lockout caused the season to be delayed by one week, starting on April 7. The regular season ended on October 5. The start of the season was delayed by a lockout of players, which commenced on December 2, 2021, following the expiration of the collective bargaining agreement (CBA) between the league and the Major League Baseball Players Association (MLBPA). On March 10, 2022, MLB and the MLBPA reached a deal on a five-year CBA, with Opening Day being held on April 7 (delayed from its originally planned March 31), and a full 162-game schedule played. Under the new CBA, universal designated hitter was adopted, the postseason was expanded to 12 teams, and the regular season tie-breaker game was eliminated. In November 2021, the Cleveland Indians announced their new team name, the Cleveland Guardians. The 2022 MLB All-Star Game was held on July 19 and hosted by the Los Angeles Dodgers at Dodger Stadium in Los Angeles.

== Lockout ==
On December 2, 2021, MLB owners voted unanimously to enact a lockout upon the expiration of the 2016 collective bargaining agreement between the league and the players' union. Issues raised between the league and union involved compensation for young players, as well as limitations on tanking to receive higher selections in the MLB draft.

The 2021–22 lockout was the first MLB work stoppage since the 1994–95 strike. It instituted a transaction freeze, including the postponement of the major league portion of the Rule 5 draft. It would be the first year since 1920 to not have a major league phase of the Rule 5 draft, though the minor league phase will still go ahead as scheduled.

On March 10, 2022, almost 100 days after the beginning of the lockout, MLB and the MLBPA reached a deal on a new, five-year CBA. Players began reporting to training camps on March 11, spring training began on March 17, and Opening Day on April 7. The league planned to play a full, 162-game season, and games displaced by the delayed start have been rescheduled.

Changes in the new CBA include a pre-arbitration bonus pool for eligible young players, increased minimum salaries (increasing from $700,000 to $780,000 over the length of the deal), a draft lottery to determine the top six selections in the draft, the establishment of an international draft, and the establishment of a Joint Competition Committee that, in 2023, will oversee the adoption of future rule changes (including base sizes and pitch clocks among others). The National League began adopting the designated hitter on a permanent basis, after having previously used it on a temporary basis during the shortened 2020 season, while the postseason will be expanded to 12 teams.

== Schedule ==
Major League Baseball released its 2022 regular season schedule on August 4, 2021. As has been the case since 2013, all teams play their four division opponents 19 times each for a total of 76 games, play six or seven games against each of the other ten same-league opponents for a total of 66 games, and 20 interleague games. Interleague play will feature AL East vs. NL Central, AL Central vs. NL West, and AL West vs. NL East.

The MLB at Field of Dreams game returned for a second year, featuring the Chicago Cubs and the Cincinnati Reds at the purpose-built ballpark in Dyersville, Iowa, on August 11. The Cubs won the game 4–2.

The annual MLB Little League Classic featured the Boston Red Sox and the Baltimore Orioles at Bowman Field in Williamsport, Pennsylvania, on August 21. The two teams were originally scheduled to play in 2020 but were unable to do so due to the COVID-19 pandemic. The Orioles won the game 5–3.

Both Canada and the United States have travel restrictions for individuals who are not vaccinated against the SARS-CoV-2 virus that causes COVID-19. Each requires incoming travelers who are not citizens to have received a full course of an approved COVID-19 vaccine no later than 14 days before entry into the respective country.

== Rule changes ==
On March 10, Major League Baseball announced the following rule changes for the 2022 season:

- The temporary rule for the 2020 and 2021 seasons that had doubleheaders played as seven-inning games was repealed.
- The National League adopted the designated hitter full-time. The NL previously adopted the rule temporarily in 2020 before removing it for the 2021 season.
- Tie-breaker games at the end of the season have been eliminated and replaced with statistical tiebreakers.
- The playoff system has been changed:
  - Twelve teams qualify for the postseason, with the division winners seeded 1 through 3, and three wild cards seeded 4 through 6 in their respective leagues.
  - The top two seeds in each league will receive a bye into the Division Series.
  - The lowest-seeded division winner and three wild card teams (each seeded according to regular season record), will play a best-of-three Wild Card round, with the higher seed hosting all three games. The 3-seed will play the 6-seed, and the 4-seed will play the 5-seed.
  - There is no re-seeding of the bracket. The 1-seed will play the winner of the 4-seed/5-seed series, and the 2-seed will play the winner of the 3-seed/6-seed series in the Division Series.

On March 22, MLB introduced a set of temporary rules for 2022:

- If a team voluntarily waives the designated hitter spot so that its starting pitcher can be in the batting order, that pitcher can remain in the game as a designated hitter after being replaced by a relief pitcher. This was colloquially called the "Ohtani rule" after rare two-way player Shohei Ohtani.
- The rule establishing an automatic runner on second base to start each extra inning in regular season games, previously repealed on March 10, was reinstated.
- Rosters were expanded from 26 players to 28 players until May 2, due to the shortened spring training.

On April 5, the league announced that all teams may use PitchCom, a Wireless system for catchers to request pitches by type and location. PitchCom is intended to reduce the risk of sign stealing and to quicken the pace of play.

On April 26, the league announced that limiting rosters to 13 pitchers had been delayed until May 30, allowing teams to carry up to 14 pitchers until then. The 13-pitcher limit was later delayed again, becoming effective June 20.

== Spring training ==
Spring training for the 2022 season began later than usual due to the lockout, beginning in mid-March and lasting into early April. Teams began workouts and practice for spring training beginning in late February. Pitchers and catchers reported first, followed by position players a few days later.

Prior to the start of the regular season, each team played between 14 and 22 spring training games, beginning on March 17. Games were initially supposed to begin on February 27. There were several times during spring training when a team had two different squads playing different teams simultaneously. Due to the lockout, the usually occasional exhibition games with non-MLB teams, such as Minor League Baseball teams, independent teams, or college teams did not occur. Spring training ended on April 6, the day before the Opening Day.

== Standings ==
=== American League ===
AL East
Team	W	L	Pct.	GB	Home	Road
^{(2)} New York Yankees	99	63	.611	—	57‍–‍24	42‍–‍39
^{(4)} Toronto Blue Jays	92	70	.568	7	47‍–‍34	45‍–‍36
^{(6)} Tampa Bay Rays	86	76	.531	13	51‍–‍30	35‍–‍46
Baltimore Orioles	83	79	.512	16	45‍–‍36	38‍–‍43
Boston Red Sox	78	84	.481	21	43‍–‍38	35‍–‍46

AL Central
Team	W	L	Pct.	GB	Home	Road
^{(3)} Cleveland Guardians	92	70	.568	—	46‍–‍35	46‍–‍35
Chicago White Sox	81	81	.500	11	37‍–‍44	44‍–‍37
Minnesota Twins	78	84	.481	14	46‍–‍35	32‍–‍49
Detroit Tigers	66	96	.407	26	36‍–‍46	30‍–‍50
Kansas City Royals	65	97	.401	27	39‍–‍42	26‍–‍55

AL West
Team	W	L	Pct.	GB	Home	Road
^{(1)} Houston Astros	106	56	.654	—	55‍–‍26	51‍–‍30
^{(5)} Seattle Mariners	90	72	.556	16	46‍–‍35	44‍–‍37
Los Angeles Angels	73	89	.451	33	40‍–‍41	33‍–‍48
Texas Rangers	68	94	.420	38	34‍–‍47	34‍–‍47
Oakland Athletics	60	102	.370	46	29‍–‍51	31‍–‍51

=== National League ===
NL East
Team	W	L	Pct.	GB	Home	Road
^{(2)} Atlanta Braves	101	61	.623	—	55‍–‍26	46‍–‍35
^{(4)} New York Mets	101	61	.623	—	54‍–‍27	47‍–‍34
^{(6)} Philadelphia Phillies	87	75	.537	14	47‍–‍34	40‍–‍41
Miami Marlins	69	93	.426	32	34‍–‍47	35‍–‍46
Washington Nationals	55	107	.340	46	26‍–‍55	29‍–‍52

NL Central
Team	W	L	Pct.	GB	Home	Road
^{(3)} St. Louis Cardinals	93	69	.574	—	53‍–‍28	40‍–‍41
Milwaukee Brewers	86	76	.531	7	46‍–‍35	40‍–‍41
Chicago Cubs	74	88	.457	19	37‍–‍44	37‍–‍44
Pittsburgh Pirates	62	100	.383	31	34‍–‍47	28‍–‍53
Cincinnati Reds	62	100	.383	31	33‍–‍48	29‍–‍52

NL West
Team	W	L	Pct.	GB	Home	Road
^{(1)} Los Angeles Dodgers	111	51	.685	—	57‍–‍24	54‍–‍27
^{(5)} San Diego Padres	89	73	.549	22	44‍–‍37	45‍–‍36
San Francisco Giants	81	81	.500	30	44‍–‍37	37‍–‍44
Arizona Diamondbacks	74	88	.457	37	40‍–‍41	34‍–‍47
Colorado Rockies	68	94	.420	43	41‍–‍40	27‍–‍54

== Postseason ==
The postseason began on October 7 and ended on November 5.

=== Bracket ===
Wild Card Series (ALWCS, NLWCS)
4	Toronto	0
5	Seattle	2
3	Cleveland	2
6	Tampa Bay	0
4	NY Mets	1
5	San Diego	2
3	St. Louis	0
6	Philadelphia	2

Division Series (ALDS, NLDS)
1	Houston	3
5	Seattle	0
American League
2	NY Yankees	3
3	Cleveland	2
1	LA Dodgers	1
5	San Diego	3
National League
2	Atlanta	1
6	Philadelphia	3

Championship Series (ALCS, NLCS)
1	Houston	4
2	NY Yankees	0
5	San Diego	1
6	Philadelphia	4

World Series
AL1	Houston	4
NL6	Philadelphia	2

== Managerial changes ==
=== General managers ===
==== Offseason ====
Team	Former GM	Reason For Leaving	New GM	Notes
Chicago Cubs	Jed Hoyer	Promoted	Carter Hawkins	On October 18, 2021, the team announced that Hawkins would be the new general manager, filling the spot that has been vacant for nearly a year. He was a long-time part of the Cleveland Indians front office for the last 14 years.
New York Mets	Zack Scott	Mutual agreement	Billy Eppler	On November 1, 2021, after a year as acting GM of the team, Scott agreed to resign because of his arrest for DUI. On November 18, former Los Angeles Angels GM Billy Eppler was named GM of the team, signing a four-year deal.

==== In-season ====
Team	Former GM	Reason For Leaving	New GM	Notes
Detroit Tigers	Al Avila	Fired	Scott Harris	On August 10, Avila was fired after a seven-year tenure as the general manager. Sam Menzin was named the interim general manager. Menzin was the Tigers' vice president and assistant general manager. On September 19, Scott Harris was named the permanent general manager.
San Francisco Giants	Scott Harris	Hired by another team	Pete Putila	On September 19, Harris was announced as the president of baseball operations for the Detroit Tigers, ending his tenure with the Giants. On October 10, Pete Putila was named the new general manager. Putila was previously the assistant general manager for the Houston Astros.

=== Field managers ===
==== Off-season ====
Team	Former Manager	Reason For Leaving	New Manager	Notes
New York Mets	Luis Rojas	Option not picked up	Buck Showalter	On October 4, 2021, the team announced that they would not pick up Luis Rojas' option for the 2022 season. Rojas went 103–119 (.464) in his two seasons with the team. On December 18, Showalter was hired as their new manager. In 20 seasons as the manager of the New York Yankees (1992–1995), Arizona Diamondbacks (1998–2000), Texas Rangers (2003–2006), and Baltimore Orioles (2010–2018), Showalter compiled a 1,551–1,517 (.506) record, with two division titles, five playoff appearances with a playoff record of 9–14 (.391), only advancing past the division series once in 2014.
Oakland Athletics	Bob Melvin	Hired by another team	Mark Kotsay	Melvin was granted permission by the Athletics to become the Padres' manager on October 28, 2021. In eleven seasons with Oakland, Melvin was 853–764 (.528), reaching the playoffs six times, including three AL West titles, and a playoff record of 7–13 (.350), never advancing past the ALDS. Kotsay, the Athletics' third base coach since 2016, was named the manager of the team on December 20. This will be his first manager position.
San Diego Padres	Jayce Tingler	Fired	Bob Melvin	On October 6, 2021, the team announced that they had dismissed Tingler with one year remaining in his contract. Tingler was hired in 2020 and led the Padres to a postseason appearance during the pandemic-shortened season. He finished his tenure going 116–106 (.523) in his two seasons with the team. Melvin was hired on November 1. He was previously the manager of the Seattle Mariners (2003–2004), Arizona Diamondbacks (2005–2009), and the Oakland Athletics (2011–2021), with a combined record of 1,346–1,272 (.514), with seven playoff appearances, a playoff record of 10–17 (.370), never advancing past the Division Series.
St. Louis Cardinals	Mike Shildt	Fired	Oliver Marmol	On October 14, 2021, Shildt was fired as manager of the Cardinals due to "philosophical differences" according to team president John Mozeliak. With a record of 252–199 (.559) in his three-plus seasons, Shildt led the Cardinals to the playoffs in his three full seasons and finished with a 4–9 (.308) post-season record. He was voted National League Manager of the Year after the 2019 season. On October 25, former bench coach Oliver Marmol was named the new manager. With the hiring, Marmol becomes the youngest manager currently in the Major Leagues.

==== In-season ====
Team	Former manager	Interim manager	Reason for leaving	New manager	Notes
Philadelphia Phillies	Joe Girardi	Rob Thomson	Fired	Rob Thomson	On June 3, the Phillies fired Girardi. In two-plus seasons as manager of the Phillies, he compiled a record of 132–141 (.484) with no playoff appearances. Thomson, the then-current bench coach, was named interim manager on June 3. This is his first managerial position. On October 10, the Phillies removed the interim tag from Thomson and signed him to a two-year contract extension for the 2023 and 2024 seasons.
Los Angeles Angels	Joe Maddon	Phil Nevin	Fired	Phil Nevin	On June 7, the Angels fired Maddon. In two-plus seasons with the Angels, he compiled a record of 130–148 (.468) with no playoff appearances. Nevin, the current third-base coach, was named the interim manager on June 7. This is his first managerial position. On October 5, the Angels announced that Nevin would be retained as manager for the 2023 season.
Toronto Blue Jays	Charlie Montoyo	John Schneider	Fired	John Schnieder	On July 13, after losing 10 of their last 13 games, the Blue Jays fired Montoyo. In four-plus seasons with the Blue Jays, he compiled a record of 236–236 (.500) with one wild card playoff appearance in 2020, losing in the Wild Card Series. Schneider, the current bench coach, was named the interim manager on July 13. This is his first managerial position. On October 21, Schnieder inked a three-year deal as the new manager.
Texas Rangers	Chris Woodward	Tony Beasley	Fired	Bruce Bochy	On August 15, the Rangers fired Woodward. In three-plus seasons with the Rangers, he compiled a record of 211–287 (.424) with no playoff appearances and no winning records. Beasley, the current third-base coach, was appointed the interim manager on the same day. This is his first managerial position. On October 21, the Rangers announced Bruce Bochy as the 20th manager in franchise history, signing a three-year deal. In 25 seasons as the manager of the San Diego Padres (1995–2006), and San Francisco Giants (2007–2019), Bochy compiled a record of 2,003–2,029 (.497) with six division titles, eight playoff appearances, and a playoff record of 44–33 (.571), winning three World Series championships with the Giants.
Chicago White Sox	Tony La Russa	Miguel Cairo	Retired	Pedro Grifol	On August 31, White Sox manager Tony La Russa was ruled out indefinitely after undergoing tests on his heart. La Russa would be ruled to not return for the season on September 24 with encouragement from his doctors. On October 3, La Russa announced he would step away from managing. Cairo, the current bench coach, was named as the interim manager on the same day La Russa was first ruled out on August 31. This is his first managerial position. Grifol was hired on November 1. Previously an assistant coach for the Kansas City Royals, this is his first managerial position.

== League leaders ==
=== American League ===
Hitting leaders
Stat	Player	Total
AVG	Luis Arráez (MIN)	.316
OPS	Aaron Judge (NYY)	1.111
HR	Aaron Judge (NYY)	62
RBI	Aaron Judge (NYY)	131
R	Aaron Judge (NYY)	133
H	Bo Bichette (TOR)	189
SB	Jorge Mateo (BAL)	35

Pitching leaders
Stat	Player	Total
W	Justin Verlander (HOU)	18
L	Marco Gonzales (SEA)	15
ERA	Justin Verlander (HOU)	1.75
K	Gerrit Cole (NYY)	257
IP	Framber Valdez (HOU)	201.1
SV	Emmanuel Clase (CLE)	42
WHIP	Justin Verlander (HOU)	0.829

=== National League ===
Hitting leaders
Stat	Player	Total
AVG	Jeff McNeil (NYM)	.326
OPS	Paul Goldschmidt (STL)	.981
HR	Kyle Schwarber (PHI)	46
RBI	Pete Alonso (NYM)	131
R	Mookie Betts (LAD); Freddie Freeman (LAD)	117
H	Freddie Freeman (LAD)	199
SB	Jon Berti (MIA)	41

Pitching leaders
Stat	Player	Total
W	Kyle Wright (ATL)	21
L	Patrick Corbin (WSH)	19
ERA	Julio Urías (LAD)	2.16
K	Corbin Burnes (MIL)	243
IP	Sandy Alcántara (MIA)	228.2
SV	Kenley Jansen (ATL)	41
WHIP	Zac Gallen (AZ)	0.913

== Milestones ==
=== Batters ===
- Seth Beer (AZ):
  - Became the first rookie in Major League history to hit a walk-off home run while trailing on Opening Day on April 7 against the San Diego Padres.
- Steven Kwan (CLE):
  - Reached base 18 times in his first five career games, the most by any player since at least 1901.
- Vladimir Guerrero Jr. (TOR):
  - Became the first player in Major League history to hit three home runs in a game (April 13), then strike out at least four times the following game (April 14). He did it against the New York Yankees.
- Miguel Cabrera (DET):
  - Recorded his 3,000th career hit with a single in the first inning against the Colorado Rockies on April 23. He became the 33rd player to reach this mark. He also becomes the seventh player in Major League history to record 3,000 hits and hit 500 home runs for his career. He joins Hank Aaron, Willie Mays, Eddie Murray, Rafael Palmeiro, Albert Pujols, and Alex Rodriguez to reach these numbers.
  - Recorded his 600th career double against the Houston Astros in the second inning on May 7. He became the 18th player to reach this mark. With this milestone, Cabrera also becomes the third player in Major League history to record 3,000 hits, 500 home runs and 600 doubles for his career, joining Hank Aaron and Albert Pujols.
  - With his sixth-inning strikeout on July 8 against the Chicago White Sox, Cabrera became the seventh player in Major League history to amass 2,000 career strikeouts.
- Josh Naylor (CLE):
  - Became the first player in Major League history to hit two three-run home runs or grand slams in the ninth inning or later of the same game on May 9. He also became the first player to have at least eight RBI in the eighth inning or later since RBI became an official statistic in 1920.
- Christian Yelich (MIL):
  - Became the sixth player in Major League history to hit for the cycle three times in his career on May 11 against the Cincinnati Reds. He also became the first player in Major League history to do so against the same team all three times.
- Yordan Alvarez / Kyle Tucker / Jeremy Peña / Michael Brantley / Yuli Gurriel (HOU):
  - Become the eighth group of players in Major League history to hit five home runs in one inning in the second inning against the Boston Red Sox on May 17.
- Albert Pujols (STL):
  - Became the tenth player in Major League history to play in 3,000 games when he replaced an injured player in the first game of a doubleheader on June 4 against the Chicago Cubs.
  - With his home run against Ross Detwiler on August 29, Detwiler became the 450th pitcher that Pujols has hit a homer against in his career, breaking the record that he shared with Barry Bonds.
  - Recorded his 700th career home run on September 23 against the Los Angeles Dodgers. He became the fourth player in Major League history to achieve this mark, joining Barry Bonds, Hank Aaron, and Babe Ruth.
  - While recording his 703rd (and final) career home run on October 3 against the San Francisco Giants, Pujols surpassed Babe Ruth for sole possession of second place with his 2,215th and 2,216th RBIs, tied Hank Aaron for second place all-time with his 370th career road home run, and surpassed Barry Bonds for sole possession of first place with his 263rd career go-ahead home run.
- Mike Trout (LAA):
  - With his go-ahead two-run home run on June 19 against the Seattle Mariners, Trout became the first player in Major League history to hit four game-winning home runs in a road series.
- Nolan Arenado / Nolan Gorman / Juan Yepez / Dylan Carlson (STL):
  - Became the 11th group of players to hit four consecutive home runs in the first inning on July 2 against the Philadelphia Phillies.
- Julio Rodríguez (SEA):
  - With his home run on July 4 against the San Diego Padres, Rodriguez became the first player since at least 1900 to accumulate 15+ home runs and 20+ stolen bases in his first 81 career games.
  - With his 25th stolen base on September 14 against the San Diego Padres, he became the third rookie in Major League history with a 25 (stolen bases)-25 (home runs) season. Chris Young (2007) and Mike Trout (2012) also accomplished this feat. Rodriguez is the first player in history to accomplish this feat in his debut season.
- Aaron Judge (NYY):
  - Became the second-fastest player in Major League history to hit 200 career home runs on July 30 against the Kansas City Royals. This was in Judge's 671st career game. Only Ryan Howard reached 200 career home runs faster as he did it in 658 games.
  - Hit his 50th home run on August 29 against the Los Angeles Angels, becoming the seventh player in Major League history to reach this plateau before September.
  - Hit his 60th home run on September 20 against the Pittsburgh Pirates, becoming the sixth player (ninth time) to hit at least 60 home runs in a season.
  - Set a new American League record for home runs in a season by hitting his 62nd home run on October 4 against the Texas Rangers. Judge broke the record set by Roger Maris in 1961.
- Vaughn Grissom (ATL):
  - Became the youngest player in Major League history to hit a home run and steal a base in his debut on August 10 against the Boston Red Sox.
- Nelson Cruz (WSH):
  - Recorded his 2,000th career hit with a single in the eighth inning on August 13 against the San Diego Padres. He became the 292nd player to reach this mark.
- Corey Dickerson (STL):
  - Became the 13th player in Major League history to collect a hit in at least ten consecutive at-bats in the expansion era (since 1961). Dickerson collected four straight hits on August 23 and 24 and then collected two more hits on August 25 before a fielder's choice that ended the streak. All hits were against the Chicago Cubs.
- Yoán Moncada (CWS):
  - Moncada became the first player in American League history to have five or more hits and five or more RBIs in a game twice in the same season. The first game occurred June 15 at the Detroit Tigers (5-for-6 with a home run and five RBIs), while the second game occurred September 8 at the Oakland Athletics (5-for-6 with two home runs and five RBIs).
- J. T. Realmuto (PHI):
  - With his 20th stolen base against the Washington Nationals on September 30, Realmuto became the second catcher in Major League history to have a 20 (stolen bases)-20 (home runs) season. He joins Iván Rodríguez, who accomplished this in 1999.
  - In Game 4 of the 2022 National League Division Series against the Atlanta Braves, Realmuto hit an inside-the-park home run, becoming the first catcher to hit a home run of this kind in Major League postseason history.

=== Pitchers ===
==== No-hitters ====
- Tylor Megill/Drew Smith/Joely Rodríguez/Seth Lugo/Edwin Díaz (NYM):
  - The five pitchers combined to throw the second no-hitter in franchise history by defeating the Philadelphia Phillies 3–0 on April 29. It was accomplished with 12 strikeouts and six walks on 159 total pitches. Megill pitched the first five innings. It is the 17th combined no-hitter in league history. This was also the 20th time that the Phillies have been no-hit in their history, which ties them with the Los Angeles Dodgers for the most times being no-hit of any franchise, which includes the postseason.
- Reid Detmers (LAA):
  - Detmers threw his first career no-hitter, and the 12th no-hitter in franchise history, by defeating the Tampa Bay Rays 12–0 on May 10. He struck out two, throwing 68 strikes on 108 pitches. His only two baserunners came via a walk in the sixth inning and a fielding error in the seventh. Making his 11th career start, Detmers became the 25th rookie and youngest Angels pitcher in history to throw a no-hitter.
- Cristian Javier / Héctor Neris / Ryan Pressly (HOU):
  - The three pitchers combined to throw a no-hitter against the New York Yankees, defeating them 3–0 on June 25. It is the Colt .45s/Astros' fourteenth no-hitter in franchise history.
- Cristian Javier / Bryan Abreu / Rafael Montero / Ryan Pressly (HOU):
  - The four pitchers combined to throw a no-hitter against the Philadelphia Phillies, defeating them 5–0 on November 2 in Game 4 of the World Series. It was only the second no-hitter in World Series history (the other being Don Larsen's perfect game in Game 5 of the 1956 World Series for the New York Yankees against the Brooklyn Dodgers), the third no-hitter in postseason history overall and first since Roy Halladay's no-hitter in Game 1 of the 2010 NLDS for the Phillies against the Cincinnati Reds, and the first combined no-hitter in postseason history.

==== Other pitching accomplishments ====
- Justin Verlander (HOU):
  - Became the 138th pitcher in Major League history to amass 3,000 career innings pitched during the game against the Seattle Mariners on April 16.
- Hunter Greene / Art Warren (CIN):
  - Combined to throw an eight-inning no-hitter on May 15 in the loss to the Pittsburgh Pirates 1–0. Because they did not pitch nine innings, it is not counted as a no-hitter by the Elias Sports Bureau, the official statistician of Major League Baseball.
- Luis García / Phil Maton (HOU):
  - Became the first pair of pitchers in Major League history to throw an immaculate inning on the same date, let alone the same game or by the same team against the Texas Rangers on June 15. They both struck out Nathaniel Lowe, Ezequiel Duran and Brad Miller.
- Madison Bumgarner (AZ):
  - Recorded his 2,000th career strikeout by retiring Luke Voit of the San Diego Padres in the fourth inning on June 22. He became the 86th pitcher to reach this mark.
- Zack Greinke (KC):
  - Started his 500th career game on June 29 against the Texas Rangers, becoming the 48th player in Major League history to reach this mark.
- Reid Detmers (LAA):
  - Became the third pitcher in Major League history to pitch a no-hitter and an immaculate inning in one season, following his immaculate inning in a game against the Texas Rangers on July 31. Sandy Koufax and Mike Fiers also accomplished this feat.
- Jacob deGrom (NYM):
  - Set the Major League record for most strikeouts by a pitcher through 200 career starts at 1,523 on August 7 against the Atlanta Braves. deGrom eclipsed the record of 1,517 that was held by Yu Darvish.
  - Set a new Major League record by recording his 40th straight start with three earned runs or fewer allowed against the Pittsburgh Pirates on September 18, breaking the record held by Jim Scott in 1913–14. deGrom's streak was snapped on September 24 by the Oakland Athletics as deGrom gave up four earned runs in the first inning.
- Edwin Diaz (NYM):
  - Recorded his 200th career save by closing out a victory against the Philadelphia Phillies on August 13. He became the 53rd player to reach this mark.
- Dylan Cease (CWS):
  - Cease went 14 consecutive starts allowing one run or fewer earned runs beginning on May 29 against the Chicago Cubs and through the August 11 game against the Kansas City Royals. It was the first time a starting pitcher went on such a streak since the earned run became a statistic in 1913, breaking the previous mark of 13 consecutive starts set by Jacob deGrom in 2021.
- George Kirby (SEA):
  - Started the game against the Washington Nationals on August 24 with 24 straight strikes, setting a Major League record for most consecutive strikes to start a game since 1988, when pitch-tracking began. He broke the record that was set by Joe Musgrove in 2018 with 21 straight strikes.
- Zac Gallen (AZ):
  - On September 4 against the Milwaukee Brewers, Gallen pitched seven scoreless innings. This was his sixth consecutive start where he pitched six or more scoreless innings, which tied the Major League record in the Modern Era (since 1900) as the fourth pitcher to accomplish this feat. He joins Don Drysdale (1968), Orel Hershiser (1988) and Zack Greinke (2015).
- Framber Valdez (HOU):
  - With his six-inning two runs allowed performance on September 18, Valdez set the Major League record for most consecutive single-season quality starts with 25, breaking the record that was set by Jacob deGrom in 2018. The record for most consecutive quality starts is 26 held by deGrom (2018–19) and Bob Gibson (1967–68). The streak was stopped on September 24 by the Baltimore Orioles as Valdez only went 5 1/3 innings giving up four earned runs.
- Spencer Strider (ATL):
  - On September 18, Strider became the fastest pitcher in Major League history to amass 200 strikeouts in a season. Strider accomplished this feat in 130 innings, breaking the record set by Randy Johnson in 2001 in 130 2/3 innings.
- Max Scherzer (NYM):
  - Recorded his 200th career win on September 19 against the Milwaukee Brewers. He became the 120th player to reach this mark. He threw six perfect innings in that game before being taken out; his fourth career game to begin with six perfect innings ties the expansion era record.
- Richard Bleier (MIA):
  - Became the first pitcher in Major League history to balk three times in the same at-bat on September 27. He had no balks in his first 303 career games.

=== Miscellaneous ===
- Houston Astros:
  - Won their 10th consecutive Opening Day contest by defeating the Los Angeles Angels 3–1 on April 7, tying the Major League record set by the Boston Beaneaters (1887–1896).
  - Tied the Major League record by hitting five home runs in an inning against the Boston Red Sox on May 17. With their second-inning onslaught, this became the eighth time in league history that this feat was accomplished.
- Bud Black (COL):
  - Won his 1,000th game as a manager as the Rockies defeated the Los Angeles Dodgers on April 10. He becomes the 66th manager to reach this mark.
- Alyssa Nakken (SF):
  - Became the first woman in Major League history to coach on-field during a regular season game on April 12. She coached first base against the San Diego Padres after Giants coach Antoan Richardson was ejected.
- Tampa Bay Rays:
  - Became the first team in Major League history to lose a no-hitter in extra innings and win in a walk-off on April 23. The Rays had a combined no-hitter broken up in the top of the 10th by the Boston Red Sox and won the game in the bottom of the inning.
  - Became the first team to field an all-Latin-American starting lineup in Major League history on September 15. In a game against the Toronto Blue Jays, the Rays started two Cubans (Yandy Díaz and Randy Arozarena), three Dominicans (Wander Franco, Manuel Margot and Jose Siri), one Colombian (Harold Ramírez), two Venezuelans (David Peralta and René Pinto), and one Mexican (Isaac Paredes).
- Dusty Baker (HOU):
  - Won his 2,000th game as a manager as the Astros defeated the Seattle Mariners on May 3. He becomes the 12th manager to reach this mark.
  - Became the fourth manager in Major League history to manage a team to 100 wins in both leagues, joining Whitey Herzog, Sparky Anderson and Tony La Russa.
- Pittsburgh Pirates:
  - With their 1–0 win over the Cincinnati Reds on May 15, the Pirates became the sixth team since 1901 to win a game, despite being no-hit. However, the Reds only pitched eight innings, so it is not officially counted as a no-hitter by the Elias Sports Bureau.
  - Became the first team in Major League history to have three different players log three-homer games in the same month. Jack Suwinski did it first on June 19, while Bryan Reynolds accomplished it on June 29 and Michael Perez was the third on June 30.
- Yadier Molina (STL):
  - Set the Major League record for most putouts by a catcher by catching a foul ball on June 14 against the Pittsburgh Pirates. In the sixth inning, Molina caught the record-breaking pop off the bat of Ke'Bryan Hayes. Molina's 14,685th putout broke the record held by Iván Rodríguez.
- New York Yankees:
  - Set the record for most home runs in June with 58, breaking the record of 56 that was held by the 2016 Baltimore Orioles and the 2019 Atlanta Braves.
  - Became the first team in Major League history with a .700 win percentage (44–16 (.733)) across their first 60 decisions to then go under .500 (29–31 (.483)) in their next 60 decisions.
- St. Louis Cardinals:
  - Hit four consecutive home runs against the Philadelphia Phillies on July 2, tying the Major League record. This was the first time in Cardinals history and eleventh in Major League history. The group of Nolan Arenado, Nolan Gorman, Juan Yepez and Dylan Carlson accomplished this feat, with all four home runs hit off Kyle Gibson in the first inning.
- Minnesota Twins:
  - Turned the first 8–5 triple play in Major League history on July 4 against the Chicago White Sox. Byron Buxton caught a deep fly ball at the right-center field wall and threw it into the infield, where third baseman Gio Urshela put out a pair of baserunners.
- Robbie Grossman (ATL)/(DET):
  - His Major League record of 440 consecutive errorless games by a position player came to an end on July 10 against the Chicago White Sox. Grossman misplayed a fly ball in the eighth inning as he was charged with his first error in more than four years. The last error he committed was on June 13, 2018.
- Boston Red Sox:
  - Set a modern-era Major League record with a −47 run differential over a three-game span (July 16, 17 and 22).
- Jesse Chavez (LAA)/(ATL):
  - Set the record for most times traded in their career after being traded to the Los Angeles Angels on August 2. This trade was the tenth time that Chavez was traded.
- Philadelphia Phillies:
  - Became the ninth team in Major League history to reach 10,000 wins with their victory against the Cincinnati Reds on August 16.
- Washington Nationals:
  - With starter Patrick Corbin's victory on August 28 against the Cincinnati Reds, a starting pitcher got a victory for the first time in 43 games, which is now a Major League record. The last victory by a starting pitcher for the Nationals was on July 6 against the Philadelphia Phillies.
- Shohei Ohtani (LAA):
  - Ohtani became the first player in Major League history ever with 10 pitching wins and 30 homers in the same season, reaching the latter mark on August 31 with a homer against the New York Yankees. This also made Ohtani the first Japanese-born player with multiple 30-homer seasons.
  - In the Angels' final game of the season on October 5 against the Oakland Athletics, Ohtani became the first player in the World Series era to qualify for MLB hitting and pitching leaderboards in the same season.
- Adam Wainwright / Yadier Molina (STL):
  - On September 14, the battery of Wainwright and Molina started their 325th game in Major League history, setting a new all-time record passing the record that was previously held by Mickey Lolich and Bill Freehan of the Detroit Tigers.
- New York Mets:
  - Set the modern-day (since 1900) record for most hit-by-pitch in Major League history when Luis Guillorme was hit in the ninth inning on September 21 against the Milwaukee Brewers. The Mets have been hit 106 times, breaking the record that was set by the Cincinnati Reds last year.
  - The Mets tied the Major League record for most strikeouts in a nine-inning game with 20 on September 18 against the Pittsburgh Pirates. Jacob deGrom started and struck out 13; Seth Lugo (1), Joely Rodríguez (5), and Trevor May (1) also pitched.
- Cleveland Guardians:
  - Became the eighth team to qualify for the postseason as the youngest team in the league, the first to do so since the New York Mets in 1986. They also became the first team in Major League history to win a division or league title while having at least 16 rookies make their debut.
- Los Angeles Dodgers:
  - The Dodgers led the National League (and Major League) in runs scored (847) and fewest runs allowed (513). This was their fifth consecutive year to lead the National League in both runs scored and fewest runs allowed, setting a record as the only team in Major League history to lead their league in both for five consecutive seasons.
- Cleveland Guardians / Tampa Bay Rays:
  - Set a Major League postseason record with 39 combined strikeouts: Tampa Bay with 20 and Cleveland with 19 in Game 2 of the ALWCS on October 8. This game also set the record for the longest scoreless postseason game in Major League history, with the first (and only) run scored in the 15th inning. Both records were surpassed a week later by the Astros and Mariners.
- Houston Astros / Seattle Mariners:
  - Set a Major League postseason record with 42 combined strikeouts: Houston with 22 and Seattle with 20 in Game 3 of the ALDS on October 15. This game also set the record for the longest scoreless postseason game in Major League history, with the first (and only) run scored in the 18th inning.
- Nolan Arenado (STL):
  - Arenado won his 10th consecutive Gold Glove award and became the second player in Major League history to win ten consecutive awards to start their career. He joins Ichiro Suzuki, who first accomplished this feat from 2001 to 2010.

== Awards and honors ==
=== Regular season ===
Baseball Writers' Association of America Awards
BBWAA Award	National League	American League
Rookie of the Year	Michael Harris II (ATL)	Julio Rodríguez (SEA)
Manager of the Year	Buck Showalter (NYM)	Terry Francona (CLE)
Cy Young Award	Sandy Alcantara (MIA)	Justin Verlander (HOU)
Most Valuable Player	Paul Goldschmidt (STL)	Aaron Judge (NYY)
Gold Glove Awards
Position	National League	American League
Pitcher	Max Fried (ATL)	Shane Bieber (CLE)
Catcher	J. T. Realmuto (PHI)	Jose Trevino (NYY)
1st Base	Christian Walker (AZ)	Vladimir Guerrero Jr. (TOR)
2nd Base	Brendan Rodgers (COL)	Andrés Giménez (CLE)
3rd Base	Nolan Arenado (STL)	Ramón Urías (BAL)
Shortstop	Dansby Swanson (ATL)	Jeremy Peña (HOU)
Left field	Ian Happ (CHC)	Steven Kwan (CLE)
Center field	Trent Grisham (SD)	Myles Straw (CLE)
Right field	Mookie Betts (LAD)	Kyle Tucker (HOU)
Utility	Brendan Donovan (STL)	DJ LeMahieu (NYY)
Silver Slugger Awards
Designated Hitter	Josh Bell (SD)/(WSH)	Yordan Alvarez (HOU)
Catcher	J. T. Realmuto (PHI)	Alejandro Kirk (TOR)
1st Base	Paul Goldschmidt (STL)	Nathaniel Lowe (TEX)
2nd Base	Jeff McNeil (NYM)	Jose Altuve (HOU)
3rd Base	Nolan Arenado (STL)	José Ramírez (CLE)
Shortstop	Trea Turner (LAD)	Xander Bogaerts (BOS)
Outfield	Mookie Betts (LAD); Kyle Schwarber (PHI); Juan Soto (SD)/(WSH)	Aaron Judge (NYY); Julio Rodríguez (SEA); Mike Trout (LAA)
Utility	Brandon Drury (SD)/(CIN)	Luis Arraez (MIN)

=== All-MLB Team ===
Players are selected through fan votes (50%) and votes from a panel of experts (50%). The winners will be selected based on merit, with no set number of nominees per position and no distinction between leagues.

All-MLB Team
Position	First Team	Second Team
Starting pitcher	Sandy Alcántara (MIA)	Dylan Cease (CWS)
Starting pitcher	Alek Manoah (TOR)	Max Fried (ATL)
Starting pitcher	Shohei Ohtani (LAA)	Aaron Nola (PHI)
Starting pitcher	Framber Valdez (HOU)	Max Scherzer (NYM)
Starting pitcher	Justin Verlander (HOU)	Julio Urías (LAD)
Relief pitcher	Emmanuel Clase (CLE)	Ryan Helsley (STL)
Relief pitcher	Edwin Díaz (NYM)	Ryan Pressly (HOU)
Designated hitter	Yordan Alvarez (HOU)	Shohei Ohtani (LAA)
Catcher	J. T. Realmuto (PHI)	Will Smith (LAD)
1st Base	Paul Goldschmidt (STL)	Freddie Freeman (LAD)
2nd Base	Jose Altuve (HOU)	Andrés Giménez (CLE)
3rd Base	Manny Machado (SD)	Nolan Arenado (STL)
Shortstop	Trea Turner (LAD)	Francisco Lindor (NYM)
Outfield	Mookie Betts (LAD)	Julio Rodríguez (SEA)
Outfield	Aaron Judge (NYY)	Kyle Schwarber (PHI)
Outfield	Mike Trout (LAA)	Kyle Tucker (HOU)

=== Other awards ===
- The Sporting News Player of the Year Award: Aaron Judge (NYY)
- Comeback Players of the Year: Justin Verlander (HOU, American); Albert Pujols (STL, National)
- Edgar Martínez Award (Best designated hitter): Shohei Ohtani (LAA)
- Hank Aaron Award: Aaron Judge (NYY, American); Paul Goldschmidt (STL, National)
- Roberto Clemente Award (Humanitarian): Justin Turner (LAD)
- Mariano Rivera AL Reliever of the Year Award (Best AL reliever): Emmanuel Clase (CLE)
- Trevor Hoffman NL Reliever of the Year Award (Best NL reliever): Edwin Díaz (NYM)
- Warren Spahn Award (Best left-handed pitcher): Julio Urías (LAD)

Fielding Bible Awards
Position	Player
Pitcher	Ranger Suárez (PHI)
Catcher	Jose Trevino (NYY)
1st Base	Christian Walker (AZ)
2nd Base	Brendan Rodgers (COL)
3rd Base	Nolan Arenado (STL)
Shortstop	Jorge Mateo (BAL)
Left Field	Steven Kwan (CLE)
Center Field	Myles Straw (CLE)
Right Field	Mookie Betts (LAD)
Multi-position	Tommy Edman (STL)

=== Monthly awards ===
==== Player of the Month ====
Month	American League	National League
April	José Ramírez	Nolan Arenado
May	Aaron Judge	Paul Goldschmidt
June	Yordan Alvarez	Kyle Schwarber
July	Aaron Judge	Austin Riley
August	Alex Bregman	Nolan Arenado
September	Aaron Judge	Eduardo Escobar

==== Rookie of the Month ====
Month	American League	National League
April	Steven Kwan	Seiya Suzuki
May	Julio Rodríguez	Luis González
June	Julio Rodríguez	Michael Harris II
July	José Miranda	Spencer Strider
August	George Kirby	Michael Harris II
September	Steven Kwan	Michael Harris II

==== Pitcher of the Month ====
Month	American League	National League
April	Logan Gilbert	Pablo López
May	Martín Pérez	Zack Wheeler
June	Dylan Cease	Sandy Alcántara
July	Dylan Cease	Merrill Kelly
August	Drew Rasmussen	Zac Gallen
September	Alek Manoah	Yu Darvish

==== Reliever of the Month ====
Month	American League	National League
April	Jordan Romano	Josh Hader
May	Clay Holmes	David Bednar
June	Emmanuel Clase	Edwin Díaz
July	Jordan Romano	Edwin Díaz
August	Emmanuel Clase	Edwin Díaz
September	Emmanuel Clase	Camilo Doval

== Home field attendance and payroll ==
Team name	Wins	%±	Home attendance	%±	Per game	Est. payroll	%±
Los Angeles Dodgers	111	4.7%	3,861,408	37.7%	47,672	$261,180,131	5.3%
St. Louis Cardinals	93	3.3%	3,320,551	57.9%	40,994	$156,814,666	1.0%
New York Yankees	99	7.6%	3,136,207	60.0%	38,719	$238,950,714	13.9%
Atlanta Braves	101	14.8%	3,129,931	36.1%	38,641	$181,075,000	42.3%
San Diego Padres	89	12.7%	2,987,470	36.3%	36,882	$173,600,824	14.2%
Houston Astros	106	11.6%	2,688,998	30.0%	33,198	$164,789,600	−13.5%
Toronto Blue Jays	92	1.1%	2,653,830	229.3%	32,763	$172,705,857	41.9%
Boston Red Sox	78	−15.2%	2,625,089	52.2%	32,409	$188,420,000	20.7%
Chicago Cubs	74	4.2%	2,616,780	32.2%	32,306	$131,085,000	−9.2%
Colorado Rockies	68	−8.1%	2,597,428	34.0%	32,067	$112,605,000	21.5%
New York Mets	101	31.2%	2,564,737	69.6%	31,663	$240,473,333	30.2%
San Francisco Giants	81	−24.3%	2,482,686	47.8%	30,650	$147,929,667	−1.9%
Los Angeles Angels	73	−5.2%	2,457,461	62.1%	30,339	$167,063,095	−11.3%
Milwaukee Brewers	86	−9.5%	2,422,420	32.8%	29,906	$128,421,127	50.2%
Seattle Mariners	90	0.0%	2,287,267	88.1%	28,238	$78,285,000	21.2%
Philadelphia Phillies	87	6.1%	2,276,736	50.2%	28,108	$209,488,461	13.1%
Washington Nationals	55	−15.4%	2,026,401	38.3%	25,017	$125,051,666	−27.5%
Texas Rangers	68	13.3%	2,011,361	−4.7%	24,832	$120,176,667	77.0%
Chicago White Sox	81	−12.9%	2,009,359	25.9%	24,807	$167,458,334	44.9%
Minnesota Twins	78	6.8%	1,801,128	37.5%	22,236	$110,792,857	−7.8%
Arizona Diamondbacks	74	42.3%	1,605,199	53.9%	19,817	$78,860,000	1.5%
Detroit Tigers	66	−14.3%	1,575,544	42.9%	19,214	$117,740,000	49.8%
Cincinnati Reds	62	−25.3%	1,395,770	−7.3%	17,232	$111,882,381	−4.2%
Baltimore Orioles	83	59.6%	1,368,367	72.5%	16,893	$48,000,000	14.1%
Cleveland Guardians	92	15.0%	1,295,870	16.3%	15,998	$65,960,000	30.8%
Kansas City Royals	65	−12.2%	1,277,686	10.2%	15,774	$87,410,000	0.7%
Pittsburgh Pirates	62	1.6%	1,257,458	46.3%	15,524	$37,925,000	−24.5%
Tampa Bay Rays	86	−14.0%	1,128,127	48.2%	13,927	$73,004,211	37.9%
Miami Marlins	69	3.0%	907,487	41.2%	11,204	$68,200,000	105.7%
Oakland Athletics	60	−30.2%	787,902	12.3%	9,849	$50,248,334	−46.9%

== Uniforms ==
=== Wholesale changes ===
- The renamed Cleveland Guardians uses a new "Guardians" wordmark logo, a "diamond C" logo on the caps, and an alternate "winged G" logo on the right sleeve of the home uniforms. The players' names and numbers are also printed in a new font that the team states "represents the unique characteristics of Cleveland with angular letters and numbers that mimic the architecture" of the Hope Memorial Bridge and its Guardians of Traffic statues. Other than that, the red, white, and blue color schemes on the regular home and road uniforms, the red alternate home uniform, and the blue alternate road uniform remain unchanged.
- The Royals have made some stylistic changes, including using "Kansas City" in block letters on the road uniforms.
- The Rays modified their Columbia blue alternate uniform, replacing the wordmark with the alternate sunburst logo.
- All teams wore modified uniforms on April 15, Jackie Robinson Day. The back of each uniform has Robinson's no. 42 rendered in a bold Dodger blue font. Patches on the left sleeve containing the no. 42 rendered in the team's regular number font.

=== City Connect uniforms ===
Major League Baseball and Nike announced that an additional seven teams adopted "City Connect" uniforms inspired by the teams' home cities. These teams join the Arizona Diamondbacks, Boston Red Sox, Chicago Cubs, Chicago White Sox, Los Angeles Dodgers, Miami Marlins, and the San Francisco Giants who unveiled their City Connect uniforms during the prior season.

- The Nationals' "City Connect" uniform featured an anthracite base, pink accents and printed cherry blossoms in honor of the annual National Cherry Blossom Festival.
- The Astros' "City Connect" uniform featured a navy base, tequila sunset accents (suggestive of its 70s and 80s rainbow uniforms), "Space City" stenciled in the NASA 'worm' font on the front, and a hat with a planet revolving around a futuristic version of the "H-star" logo, in honor of Houston being home to the Johnson Space Center.
- The Royals' "City Connect" uniform featured a navy base and powder blue accents, and a stylized "KC" insignia in homage to Kansas City's "City of Fountains" nickname.
- The Rockies' "City Connect" uniform featured a green base, purple accents, Colorado written on the front, and a special logo on the cap in order of the state of "Colorado" License plates.
- The Angels' "City Connect" uniform featured a sand base, red accents and "Angels" written on the front in honor of the beaches in Southern California.
- The Brewers' "City Connect" uniform featured a powder blue base, navy accents, yellow and white striping, a grill and bratwurst patch, the team's "Brew Crew" nickname, and the MKE airport code with "414" blended in on the hat in honor of being in Milwaukee during the summer.
- The Padres' "City Connect" uniform featured a white base, pink and mint sleeves, and San Diego on the front in honor of the culture of both the city of San Diego and Tijuana.

=== Anniversaries and special events ===
- All dates as scheduled and subject to change

Team	Special occasion
All teams	#42 patch for Jackie Robinson Day (April 15, commemoration of 75th anniversary)
All teams	Pink ribbons for breast cancer awareness (May 8, Mother's Day)
All teams	Patch for Armed Forces Day (May 21) Camouflage caps for Armed Forces Day weekend (May 20–22)
All teams	Poppy for Memorial Day (May 30)
All teams	"4-ALS" patch for Lou Gehrig Day (June 2)
All teams	"Play Ball" patch in partnership with USA Baseball and USA Softball (June 10–12)
All teams	Blue ribbons for prostate cancer (June 19, Father's Day)
All teams	Gold ribbons for childhood cancer (August 26)
All teams	#21 patch for Roberto Clemente Day (September 15)
Atlanta Braves	2021 World Series championship (April 9)
Baltimore Orioles	30th anniversary of Oriole Park at Camden Yards
Boston Red Sox	15th anniversary of 2007 World Series championship #2 patch in memory of Jerry Remy
Detroit Tigers	"KB" patch in memory of first base coach Kimera Bartee #1 patch in commemoration of Lou Whitaker's number retirement (August 6)
Houston Astros	60th anniversary season
Kansas City Royals	Signature in memory of long-time scout Art Stewart
Los Angeles Dodgers	2022 All-Star Game (until July 17); 60th Anniversary at Dodger Stadium "VIN" patch in memory of Vin Scully (since August 3) #30 patch in memory of Maury Wills (since September 21)
Minnesota Twins	#36 patch in commemoration of Jim Kaat's number retirement (July 16)
New York Mets	Tom Seaver statue dedication (April 15) #17 patch in commemoration of Keith Hernandez's number retirement (July 9)
Oakland Athletics	"RAY" patch in memory of Ray Fosse (white jersey only)
San Francisco Giants	10th anniversary of 2012 World Series championship #22 patch in commemoration of Will Clark's number retirement (July 30)
Texas Rangers	50th anniversary season

== Broadcasting rights ==
=== Television ===
==== National ====
The 2022 season marked the first season of multiple broadcasting deals in Major League Baseball in the United States, most of which run through the 2028 season:

- Fox remains the league's main broadcaster, carrying a package of regular season games on the main Fox broadcast network and FS1, and Spanish-language broadcasts on Fox Deportes. Fox aired primetime Baseball Night in America games primarily on Saturday nights, as well as the All-Star Game and MLB at Field of Dreams games. With the move of Joe Buck to ESPN and Monday Night Football over the NFL offseason, Joe Davis became the new lead play-by-play announcer for Fox's MLB coverage.
- ESPN networks carry 30 exclusive games per season, including 25 Sunday Night Baseball games, as well as an Opening Day primetime game, the Home Run Derby, and Spanish-language broadcasts on ESPN Deportes. ESPN dropped most of its weeknight game packages under its new contract, with only five non-Sunday games scheduled (most of which air as Wednesday Night Baseball). ESPN has the option to carry selected games on ABC and stream all of its games on ESPN+ (which, as before, carries a daily game from MLB.tv at no additional charge). ESPN+ games are also available to commercial establishments on the ESPN+ for Business package via DirecTV.
- Apple Inc. established a new exclusive package known as Friday Night Baseball in the United States, Canada, and other international territories, which is produced by MLB Network and streams on Apple TV+.
- NBC Sports re-entered MLB broadcasting with MLB Sunday Leadoff, a new exclusive package of Sunday afternoon games streamed on Peacock. The contract will initially be for two years.
- TBS switched from late-season Sunday games to Tuesday-night games throughout the season.
- MLB Network broadcasts various games throughout the season, including original MLB Network Showcase games, and simulcasts of games from local broadcasters.
- The MLB Game of the Week Live on YouTube returned with fifteen games during the season.

For the postseason, ESPN networks held rights to the wild-card round; due to logistical concerns (especially with the fluctuating placements of teams in the standings during the final games of the regular season), the network employed remote production for the Padres/Mets and Mariners/Blue Jays series. The latter series employed a variant of the "enhanced world feed" model used in the 2020 season, with commentators and other selected staff on-site at Rogers Centre, but using video feeds from the Sportsnet production.

Fox Sports held rights to the National League Division Series, Championship Series, and the World Series for the 23rd consecutive season; while TBS held rights to the American League Division Series and Championship Series. Spanish-language broadcasts of all ALDS and ALCS games aired on MLB Network.

==== Local ====
- Amazon Prime Video exclusively streamed 21 Yankees games in the Yankees home market (except for the final game in the package, which was simulcast on both Prime Video and YES Network due to Aaron Judge's home run record). These games formerly were allocated to WPIX (which retains a sub-licensed 28-game Mets package from SNY).
- Kevin Brown became the new primary play-by-play voice for the Baltimore Orioles on MASN, replacing Scott Garceau.
- Kevin Frandsen became the new color commentator for the Washington Nationals on MASN, replacing F. P. Santangelo.
- Dallas Braden became the new primary color commentator for the Oakland Athletics on NBC Sports California, replacing Ray Fosse.
- In Canada, Sportsnet—the main Canadian rightsholder of MLB, and regional broadcaster of the co-owned Toronto Blue Jays—gained the rights to produce local broadcasts of postseason games in the event that the Blue Jays participate (as opposed to previous seasons, where it was required to simulcast the U.S. telecasts), featuring its main broadcast team of Buck Martinez and Pat Tabler (Sportsnet's alternate play-by-play announcer, Dan Shulman, had commitments to ESPN Radio's postseason coverage. This became moot for future seasons after Shulman announced that he would step down from ESPN Radio's coverage after the 2022 season to focus more on roles at Sportsnet).
- On June 1, 2022, NESN, the television home of the Boston Red Sox, launched NESN 360, an over-the-top subscription streaming platform that offers live streams of Red Sox games without a cable subscription.
- On June 23, 2022, Bally Sports soft-launched Bally Sports+, an over-the-top subscription streaming platform that offers live streams and market-specific video-on-demand content from its individual regional networks. At that time, Bally was able to negotiate the streaming rights for only five of the MLB teams it holds local TV rights to Detroit, Kansas City, Miami, Milwaukee, and Tampa.

=== Radio ===
==== National ====
- ESPN Radio aired its 25th season of national coverage, including Sunday Night Baseball, Saturday games, Opening Day, the Home Run Derby, All-Star Game, and the entire Major League Baseball postseason. In October 2022, Dan Shulman announced that he would step down from ESPN Radio's MLB coverage after the 2022 postseason, with Jon Sciambi succeeding him as the lead broadcaster for postseason coverage in 2023.
- TUDN Radio aired Spanish-language coverage of select regular season and postseason games, including the Home Run Derby, the All-Star Game, and the World Series.

==== Local ====
- On September 28, 2021, Dodgers radio announcer Jaime Jarrín announced his plans to retire after the 2022 season, his 64th as part of the Dodgers' Spanish radio broadcast team. Jarrín, who turned 86 that December, only worked Dodgers home games in 2022.
- On March 31, 2022, the New York Mets and Audacy announced that the team's games would be openly streamed on WCBS's Audacy app stream and the Mets website throughout the Mets' territory to make up for shortfalls in the team's radio network, which since 2020 has only consisted of WCBS and WPSL in Ft. Pierce, Florida, where its spring training site is based. Audacy will also produce a Spanish-language broadcast for WEPN, which will also be available through the Audacy app.

== Retirements ==
The following players retired during the 2022 season and before the start of the 2023 campaign:

- Tony Watson – April 18
- Jake Arrieta – April 18
- Jon Jay – April 27
- Gerardo Parra – May 8
- Joe Panik – May 19
- Josh Osich – May 22
- J. A. Happ – May 26
- Ryan Eades – May 27
- Russell Martin – May 28
- Dillon Overton – July 8
- Steven Souza Jr. – July 19
- Matt Joyce – August 1
- Jonathan Lucroy – August 2
- Dellin Betances – August 17
- Robby Scott – August 22
- Alec Bettinger – August 23
- Edwin Jackson – September 9
- Kurt Suzuki – September 20; retired at the end of the season
- Stephen Vogt – September 22; retired at the end of the season
- Dustin Garneau – October 10
- Josh Reddick – October 19
- Eduardo Núñez – October 20
- Brock Holt – October 27
- Jason Castro – December 2
- Rick Porcello – December 5
- Deck McGuire – December 16
- Jeren Kendall – December 16
- Steve Cishek – December 30
- Scott Oberg – January 10, 2023
- Josh Lindblom – January 12
- Travis Shaw – January 16
- Adam Warren – January 18
- David Phelps – January 18
- Aaron Slegers – January 19
- Darren O'Day – January 30
- Dexter Fowler – January 31
- Josh Ockimey – January 31
- Jake McGee – February 3
- Justin Bour – February 10
- Eric Thames – February 15
- René Rivera – February 17
- Jason Kipnis – February 20
- Stefan Crichton – February 27
- Mitch Moreland – March 7
- Jordan Yamamoto – March 13
- Joseph Odom – March 19
- Ryan Lavarnway – March 22
- Jed Lowrie – March 23
- Sergio Romo – March 27

== Retired numbers ==
- Gil Hodges posthumously had his No. 14 retired by the Los Angeles Dodgers on June 4. This was the 11th number retired by the team.
- Ryan Zimmerman had his No. 11 retired by the Washington Nationals on June 18. This was the first number retired by the Nationals.
- Keith Hernandez had his No. 17 retired by the New York Mets on July 9. This was the sixth number retired by the team.
- Jim Kaat had his No. 36 retired by the Minnesota Twins on July 16. This was the ninth number retired by the team.
- Will Clark had his No. 22 retired by the San Francisco Giants on July 30. This was the 11th number retired by the team.
- Lou Whitaker had his No. 1 retired by the Detroit Tigers on August 6. This was the 11th number retired by the team.
- Paul O'Neill had his No. 21 retired by the New York Yankees on August 21. This was the 23rd number retired by the team.
- Willie Mays had his No. 24 retired by the New York Mets on August 27. This was the seventh number retired by the team.
- Dave Stewart had his No. 34 retired by the Oakland Athletics on September 11. This was the sixth player to have his number retired by the franchise and was the second player to have the number retired in honor of them after it was originally retired in 1993 for Rollie Fingers.

== See also ==
- 2022 in baseball
- MLB Home Run Derby X
