= Jacob Gatewood =

American baseball player (born 1995)

Jake Gatewood

Free agent
- Third baseman / Shortstop
- Born: September 25, 1995 (age 31); Clovis, California, U.S.
- Bats: Right Throws: Right
- Stats at Baseball Reference

Henry Jacib Gatewood (born September 25, 1995) is an American professional baseball shortstop who is a free agent. He was drafted 41st overall in the 2014 Major League Baseball draft by the Milwaukee Brewers.

== Career ==
Gatewood attended Clovis High School in Clovis, California. He was the winner of the junior Home Run Derby at Citi Field on July 15, 2013.

=== Milwaukee Brewers ===
Gatewood at one point was considered a potential top overall pick in the 2014 Major League Baseball draft. He ended up getting drafted by the Milwaukee Brewers 41st overall in the draft. He signed on June 14, and was assigned to the Arizona League Brewers, where he posted a .206 batting average with three home runs and 32 RBI in 50 games. Gatewood spent 2015 with both the Wisconsin Timber Rattlers and the Helena Brewers, batting a combined .244 with ten home runs and 57 RBI in 109 games between both teams. In 2016, Gatewood spent the whole season with the Timber Rattlers, where he batted .240 with 14 home runs and 64 RBI in 126 games.

Gatewood began the 2017 season with the Carolina Mudcats, but was later promoted to the Biloxi Shuckers in August, posting a combined .264 average along with 15 home runs, 62 RBI, ten stolen bases and a .775 OPS in 134 games between both clubs, and he spent 2018 back with Biloxi, batting .244 with 19 home runs and 59 RBI in 94 games. On July 24, 2018, while playing for Biloxi, Gatewood was injured running to first base, and it was later revealed that he had torn his ACL in his left knee, requiring season-ending surgery. In 2019, he played with Biloxi, slashing .187/.244/.331 with 13 home runs and 45 RBI over 94 games. Gatewood did not in a game in 2020 due to the cancellation of the minor league season because of the COVID-19 pandemic. He was not included in the Brewers' 60-man player pool and elected free agency on November 2, 2020.

=== Los Angeles Angels ===
On April 2, 2021, Gatewood signed a minor league contract with the Los Angeles Angels organization. Gatewood spent the year with the Triple-A Salt Lake Bees, hitting .227/.281/.471 with 28 home runs and 84 RBI in 116 games. He elected free agency after the season on November 7.

On November 16, 2021, Gatewood re-signed with the Angels on a new minor league contract. Gatewood played in 108 games for Salt Lake in 2022, batting .211/.261/.439 with 22 home runs and 66 RBI. He elected free agency following the season on November 10, 2022.

=== Tecolotes de los Dos Laredos ===
On April 10, 2023, Gatewood signed with the Tecolotes de los Dos Laredos of the Mexican League. In 78 games for Dos Laredos, Gatewood hit .252/.314/.387 with six home runs, 36 RBI, and five stolen bases.

=== Gastonia Ghost Peppers ===
On April 18, 2024, Gatewood signed with the Gastonia Ghost Peppers of the Atlantic League of Professional Baseball. In 118 appearances for Gastonia, he slashed .295/.395/.607 with 31 home runs, 121 stolen bases, and 13 stolen bases. Gatewood became a free agent following the season.

=== New York Yankees ===
On March 21, 2025, Gatewood signed a minor league contract with the New York Yankees. He made 73 appearances split between the Double-A Somerset Patriots and Triple-A Scranton/Wilkes-Barre RailRiders, slashing a combined .206/.295/.374 with seven home runs, 29 RBI, and five stolen bases. Gatewood elected free agency following the season on November 6.
