= Kodi Medeiros =

American baseball player (born 1996)

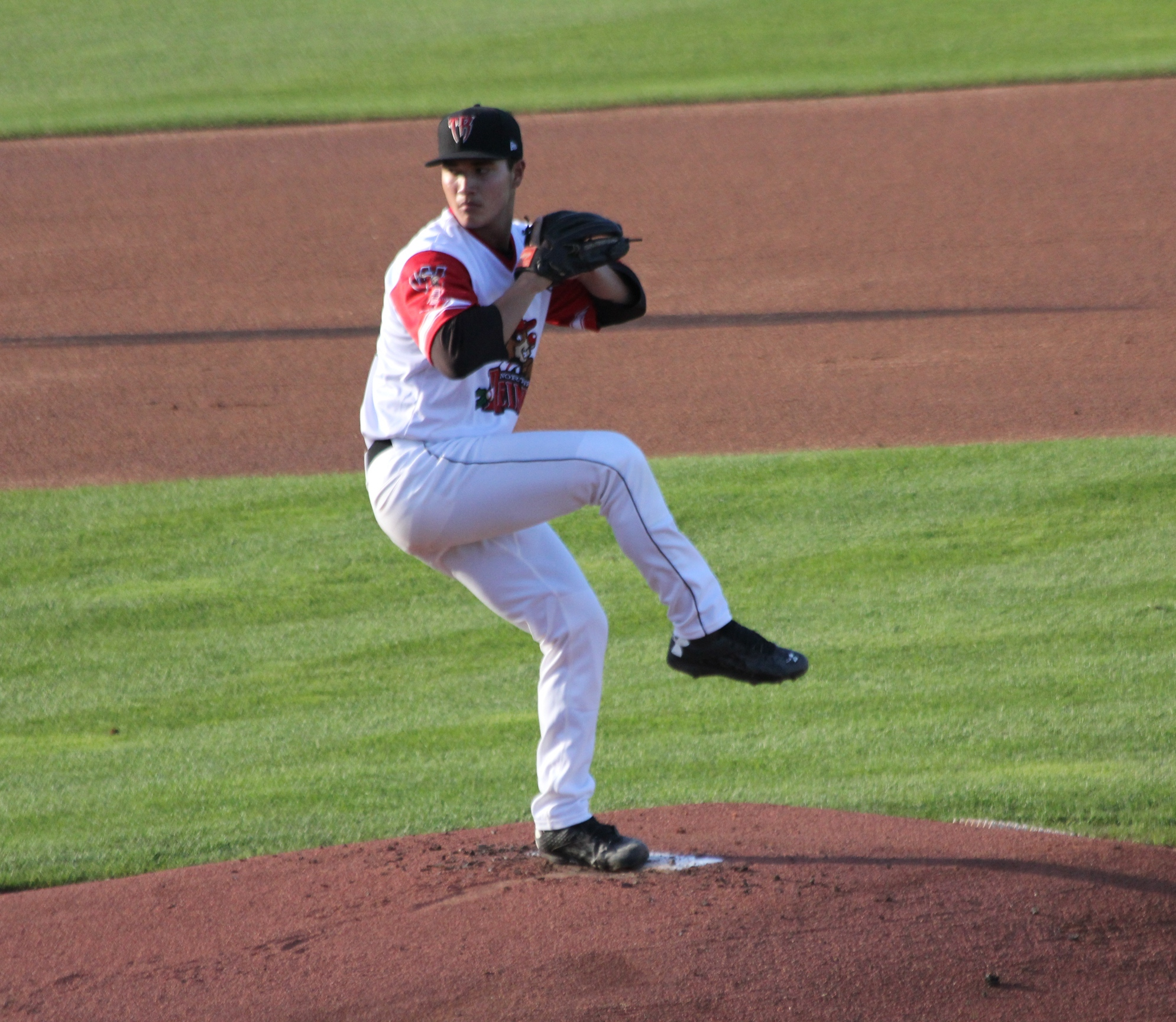
- Medeiros pitching for the Wisconsin Timber Rattlers in 2015
- Pitcher
- Born: May 25, 1996 (age 29); Hilo, Hawaii, U.S.
- Bats: Left Throws: Left

Kodi Mitsugi-Kaiana Medeiros (born May 25, 1996) is an American former professional baseball pitcher. He was drafted by the Milwaukee Brewers in the first round of the 2014 Major League Baseball draft, but would never play in Major League Baseball (MLB) after spending 8 years in the minor leagues.

== Career ==
Medeiros attended Waiakea High School in Hilo, Hawaii. In August 2013, he pitched in the Perfect Game All-American Classic at Petco Park. As a senior, he was the Hawaii Gatorade Baseball Player of the Year after going 7–1 with a 0.97 earned run average (ERA) and 83 strikeouts in 43 1/3 innings pitched. He also had a .486 batting average, one home run and 13 runs batted in.

Medeiros signed with Pepperdine University in December 2013. He was considered one of the top prospects for the 2014 Major League Baseball draft.

=== Milwaukee Brewers ===
The Milwaukee Brewers selected Medeiros with the 12th overall selection in the first round of the 2014 MLB draft. He signed on June 14, forgoing his commitment to Pepperdine, and was assigned to the Arizona League Brewers where he went 0–2 with a 7.13 ERA in 17 2/3 innings pitched. He spent 2015 with the Wisconsin Timber Rattlers, where he posted a 4–5 record with a 4.44 ERA in 25 games (16 starts), and 2016 with the Brevard County Manatees where he went 4–12 with a 5.93 ERA over 23 games (22 starts). Medeiros spent 2017 with the Carolina Mudcats, pitching to an 8–9 record, a 4.98 ERA, and a 1.31 WHIP in 27 games (18 starts). He began 2018 with the Biloxi Shuckers.

=== Chicago White Sox ===
On July 26, 2018, Medeiros was traded to the Chicago White Sox (along with Wilber Perez) in exchange for Joakim Soria. He was assigned to the Birmingham Barons and finished the season there. In 27 games (22 starts) between Biloxi and Birmingham, he compiled a 7–7 record with a 3.60 ERA. The White Sox added him to their 40-man roster after the 2018 season.

Medeiros began 2019 on the injured list with Birmingham. He was activated in April. On January 10, 2020, Medeiros was outrighted off of the 40-man roster. In August 2020, Medeiros was assigned to the White Sox alternate training camp. Medeiros did not play in a game in 2020 due to the cancellation of the minor league season because of the COVID-19 pandemic. In 2021, Medeiros played for the Triple-A Charlotte Knights, logging a 5.52 ERA with 37 strikeouts in 30 appearances. On November 7, 2021, Medeiros elected free agency.

=== Los Angeles Angels ===
On March 9, 2022, Medeiros signed a minor league contract with the Los Angeles Angels. Medeiros made 10 appearances for the Triple-A Salt Lake Bees, but struggled to a 10.80 ERA with 9 strikeouts in 11.2 innings pitched. He was released by the Angels organization on June 20.

On March 19, 2023, Medeiros announced his retirement from professional baseball via Instagram.
