= 2014 Major League Baseball draft =

Major League Baseball draft of 2014

General information
- Date: June 5–7, 2014
- Location: Secaucus, New Jersey
- Network: MLB Network

Overview
- 1,215 total selections
- First selection: Brady Aiken; Houston Astros
- First round selections: 41

The 2014 Major League Baseball draft was held from June 5 through June 7, 2014, to assign amateur baseball players to MLB teams. The first two rounds were conducted on June 5, followed by rounds three through ten on June 6, and the last 30 rounds on June 7. It was broadcast from Studio 42 of the MLB Network in Secaucus, New Jersey.

The draft order was the reverse order of the 2013 MLB regular season standings. As the Astros finished the 2013 season with the worst record, they had the first overall selection for the third consecutive year. In addition, the Toronto Blue Jays got the 11th pick, as compensation for failing to sign Phil Bickford, the 10th overall selection of the 2013 MLB draft. The St. Louis Cardinals got bumped from #30 to #31 because although tied with the Boston Red Sox for most wins in the 2013 regular season, the Red Sox had fewer wins in 2012. Kansas City Royals first round draft pick Brandon Finnegan made his Major League debut on September 6, 2014, the first player to reach the majors from the 2014 draft class, with Carlos Rodon the second. Rodon first appeared for the Chicago White Sox on April 21, 2015. Finnegan became the first player to play in both the College World Series, for TCU, and the MLB World Series, for Kansas City, in the same year. Kyle Schwarber was the first position player to reach the majors from the 2014 draft class doing so June 16, 2015.

== First round draft order ==
Key
	All-Star
*	Player did not sign

Pick	Player	Team	Position	School
1	Brady Aiken*	Houston Astros	Left-handed pitcher	Cathedral Catholic High School (CA)
2	Tyler Kolek	Miami Marlins	Right-handed pitcher	Shepherd High School (TX)
3	Carlos Rodón	Chicago White Sox	Left-handed pitcher	NC State
4	Kyle Schwarber	Chicago Cubs	Catcher	Indiana
5	Nick Gordon	Minnesota Twins	Shortstop	Olympia High School (FL)
6	Alex Jackson	Seattle Mariners	Outfielder	Rancho Bernardo High School (CA)
7	Aaron Nola	Philadelphia Phillies	Right-handed pitcher	LSU
8	Kyle Freeland	Colorado Rockies	Left-handed pitcher	Evansville
9	Jeff Hoffman	Toronto Blue Jays	Right-handed pitcher	East Carolina
10	Michael Conforto	New York Mets	Outfielder	Oregon State
11	Max Pentecost	Toronto Blue Jays (Note: Compensation pick for failing to sign Phillip Bickford in the 2013 Major League Baseball draft.)	Catcher	Kennesaw State
12	Kodi Medeiros	Milwaukee Brewers	Left-handed pitcher	Waiakea High School (HI)
13	Trea Turner	San Diego Padres	Shortstop	NC State
14	Tyler Beede	San Francisco Giants	Right-handed pitcher	Vanderbilt
15	Sean Newcomb	Los Angeles Angels of Anaheim	Left-handed pitcher	Hartford
16	Touki Toussaint	Arizona Diamondbacks	Right-handed pitcher	Coral Springs Christian Academy (FL)
17	Brandon Finnegan	Kansas City Royals	Left-handed pitcher	TCU
18	Erick Fedde	Washington Nationals	Right-handed pitcher	UNLV
19	Nick Howard	Cincinnati Reds	Right-handed pitcher	Virginia
20	Casey Gillaspie	Tampa Bay Rays	First baseman	Wichita State
21	Bradley Zimmer	Cleveland Indians	Outfielder	San Francisco
22	Grant Holmes	Los Angeles Dodgers	Right-handed pitcher	Conway High School (SC)
23	Derek Hill	Detroit Tigers	Outfielder	Elk Grove High School (CA)
24	Cole Tucker	Pittsburgh Pirates	Shortstop	Mountain Pointe High School (AZ)
25	Matt Chapman	Oakland Athletics	Third baseman	Cal State Fullerton
26	Michael Chavis	Boston Red Sox	Shortstop	Sprayberry High School (GA)
27	Luke Weaver	St. Louis Cardinals	Right-handed pitcher	Florida State

=== Compensatory round ===
Pick	Player	Team	Position	School
28	Foster Griffin	Kansas City Royals (Note: Compensation pick for the Atlanta Braves signing Ervin Santana)	Left-handed pitcher	The First Academy (FL)
29	Alex Blandino	Cincinnati Reds (Note: Compensation pick for the Texas Rangers signing Shin-Soo Choo.)	Third Baseman	Stanford
30	Luis Ortiz	Texas Rangers (Note: Compensation pick for the Baltimore Orioles signing Nelson Cruz.)	Right-handed pitcher	Sanger High School (CA)
31	Justus Sheffield	Cleveland Indians (Note: Compensation pick for the Baltimore Orioles signing Ubaldo Jiménez.)	Left-handed pitcher	Tullahoma High School (TN)
32	Braxton Davidson	Atlanta Braves (Note: Compensation pick for the New York Yankees signing Brian McCann.)	Outfielder	T.C. Roberson High School (NC)
33	Michael Kopech	Boston Red Sox (Note: Compensation pick for the New York Yankees signing Jacoby Ellsbury.)	Right-handed pitcher	Mount Pleasant High School (TX)
34	Jack Flaherty	St. Louis Cardinals (Note: Compensation pick for the New York Yankees signing Carlos Beltrán.)	Right-handed pitcher	Harvard-Westlake School (CA)

=== Competitive balance round A ===
Pick	Player	Team	Position	School
35	Forrest Wall	Colorado Rockies	Second baseman	Orangewood Christian School (FL)
36	Blake Anderson	Miami Marlins (Note: Compensation pick for failing to sign Matt Krook in the 2013 Major League Baseball draft.)	Catcher	West Lauderdale High School (MS)
37	Derek Fisher	Houston Astros (Note: The Astros acquired the 37th overall pick, L. J. Hoes, and Josh Hader from the Orioles in exchange for Bud Norris at the 2013 trade deadline.)	Outfielder	Virginia
38	Mike Papi	Cleveland Indians	Outfielder	Virginia
39	Connor Joe	Pittsburgh Pirates (Note: The Pirates acquired the 39th overall pick from the Marlins in exchange for Bryan Morris on June 1, 2014.)	Outfielder	San Diego
40	Chase Vallot	Kansas City Royals	Catcher	St. Thomas More School (LA)
41	Jacob Gatewood	Milwaukee Brewers	Shortstop	Clovis High School (CA)

== Other notable selections ==
Round	Pick	Player	Team	Position	School
2	42	A. J. Reed	Houston Astros	First baseman	Kentucky
2	46	Nick Burdi	Minnesota Twins	Right-handed pitcher	Louisville
2	48	Ryan Castellani	Colorado Rockies	Right-handed pitcher	Brophy College Preparatory (AZ)
2	49	Sean Reid-Foley	Toronto Blue Jays	Right-handed pitcher	Sandalwood High School (FL)
2	50	Monte Harrison	Milwaukee Brewers	Outfielder	Lee's Summit West High School (MO)
2	51	Michael Gettys	San Diego Padres	Outfielder	Gainesville High School (GA)
2	52	Aramis Garcia	San Francisco Giants	Catcher	Florida International
2	55	Jacob Lindgren	New York Yankees	Left-handed pitcher	Mississippi State
2	56	Scott Blewett	Kansas City Royals	Right-handed pitcher	Charles W. Baker High School (NY)
2	57	Andrew Suarez*	Washington Nationals	Left-handed pitcher	University of Miami
2	62	Alex Verdugo	Los Angeles Dodgers	Outfielder	Sahuaro High School (AZ)
2	63	Spencer Turnbull	Detroit Tigers	Right-handed pitcher	Alabama
2	64	Mitch Keller	Pittsburgh Pirates	Right-handed pitcher	Xavier High School (IA)
2	65	Daniel Gossett	Oakland Athletics	Right-handed pitcher	Clemson
2	67	Sam Travis	Boston Red Sox	First baseman	Indiana
2	70	Isan Díaz	Arizona Diamondbacks	Shortstop	Springfield Central High School (MA)
2	72	Brent Honeywell	Tampa Bay Rays	Right-handed pitcher	Walters State Community College
2	74	Gareth Morgan	Seattle Mariners	Outfielder	Blyth Academy (ON)
3	75	J. D. Davis	Houston Astros	Third baseman	Cal State Fullerton
3	76	Brian Anderson	Miami Marlins	Second baseman	Arkansas
3	77	Jace Fry	Chicago White Sox	Left-handed pitcher	Oregon State
3	78	Mark Zagunis	Chicago Cubs	Catcher	Virginia Tech
3	82	Sam Howard	Colorado Rockies	Left-handed pitcher	Georgia Southern
3	85	Cy Sneed	Milwaukee Brewers	Right-handed pitcher	Dallas Baptist
3	88	Chris Ellis	Los Angeles Angels	Right-handed pitcher	Ole Miss
3	92	Eric Skoglund	Kansas City Royals	Left-handed pitcher	Central Florida
3	97	Bobby Bradley	Cleveland Indians	First baseman	Harrison Central High School (MS)
3	99	Grayson Greiner	Detroit Tigers	Catcher	South Carolina
3	100	Jordan Luplow	Pittsburgh Pirates	Outfielder	Fresno State
3	101	Brett Graves	Oakland Athletics	Right-handed pitcher	Missouri
3	102	Max Povse	Atlanta Braves	Right-handed pitcher	UNC Greensboro
3	103	Jake Cosart	Boston Red Sox	Right-handed pitcher	Seminole State College of Florida
4	106	Daniel Mengden	Houston Astros	Right-handed pitcher	Texas A&M
4	111	Ryan Yarbrough	Seattle Mariners	Left-handed pitcher	Old Dominion
4	118	Logan Webb	San Francisco Giants	Right-handed pitcher	Rocklin High School
4	121	Pat Connaughton	Baltimore Orioles	Right-handed pitcher	Notre Dame
4	122	Jordan Montgomery	New York Yankees	Left-handed pitcher	South Carolina
4	126	Brett Martin	Texas Rangers	Left-handed pitcher	Walters State Community College
4	129	Jeff Brigham	Los Angeles Dodgers	Right-handed pitcher	Washington
4	131	Taylor Gushue	Pittsburgh Pirates	Catcher	Florida
4	133	Chad Sobotka	Atlanta Braves	Right-handed pitcher	USC Upstate
4	135	Austin Gomber	St. Louis Cardinals	Left-handed pitcher	Florida Atlantic
5	136	Jacob Nix*	Houston Astros	Right-handed pitcher	Los Alamitos High School (CA)
5	139	Justin Steele	Chicago Cubs	Left-handed pitcher	George County High School (MS)
5	141	Dan Altavilla	Seattle Mariners	Right-handed pitcher	Mercyhurst
5	142	Rhys Hoskins	Philadelphia Phillies	First baseman	Sacramento State
5	143	Kevin Padlo	Colorado Rockies	Third baseman	Murrieta Valley High School (CA)
5	144	Lane Thomas	Toronto Blue Jays	Right fielder	Bearden High School (TN)
5	148	Sam Coonrod	San Francisco Giants	Right-handed pitcher	Southern Illinois
5	149	Jake Jewell	Los Angeles Angels	Right-handed pitcher	Northeastern Oklahoma A&M College
5	151	David Hess	Baltimore Orioles	Right-handed pitcher	Tennessee Tech
5	158	Julian Merryweather	Cleveland Indians	Right-handed pitcher	Oklahoma Baptist
5	162	Heath Fillmyer	Oakland Athletics	Right-handed pitcher	Mercer County Community College
5	164	Josh Ockimey	Boston Red Sox	First baseman	Saints John Neumann and Maria Goretti Catholic High School (PA)
6	166	Brock Dykxhoorn	Houston Astros	Right-handed pitcher	Central Arizona College
6	169	Dylan Cease	Chicago Cubs	Right-handed pitcher	Milton High School (GA)
6	170	John Curtiss	Minnesota Twins	Right-handed pitcher	Texas
6	172	Brandon Leibrandt	Philadelphia Phillies	Left-handed pitcher	Florida State
6	180	Zac Curtis	Arizona Diamondbacks	Left-handed pitcher	Middle Tennessee State
6	181	Tanner Scott	Baltimore Orioles	Left-handed pitcher	Howard College
6	182	Jonathan Holder	New York Yankees	Right-handed pitcher	Mississippi State
6	186	Jose Trevino	Texas Rangers	Third baseman	Oral Roberts
6	189	Brock Stewart	Los Angeles Dodgers	Right-handed pitcher	Illinois State
6	191	Tyler Eppler	Pittsburgh Pirates	Right-handed pitcher	Sam Houston State
7	197	Anfernee Seymour	Atlanta Braves	Shortstop	American Heritage School (FL)
7	199	James Norwood	Chicago Cubs	Pitcher	Saint Louis
7	205	Brad Wieck	New York Mets	Left-handed pitcher	Oklahoma City University
7	212	Mark Payton	New York Yankees	Outfielder	Texas
7	219	Trevor Oaks	Los Angeles Dodgers	Right-handed pitcher	California Baptist
7	223	Luke Dykstra	Atlanta Braves	Second baseman	Westlake High School (CA)
8	227	Stone Garrett	Miami Marlins	Outfielder	George Ranch High School (TX)
8	233	Harrison Musgrave	Colorado Rockies	Left-handed pitcher	West Virginia
8	234	Justin Shafer	Toronto Blue Jays	Right-handed pitcher	Florida
8	238	Austin Slater	San Francisco Giants	Outfielder	Stanford University
8	241	Steve Wilkerson	Baltimore Orioles	Second Baseman	Clemson University
8	243	Ryan O'Hearn	Kansas City Royals	First baseman	Sam Houston State University
8	245	Brian O'Grady	Cincinnati Reds	First baseman	Rutgers
9	259	James Farris	Chicago Cubs	Right-handed pitcher	University of Arizona
9	272	Vicente Conde	New York Yankees	Shortstop	Vanderbilt University
9	285	Daniel Ponce de Leon	St. Louis Cardinals	Right-handed pitcher	Embry–Riddle Aeronautical University
10	287	Dillon Peters	Miami Marlins	Left-handed pitcher	University of Texas at Austin
10	294	Jordan Romano	Toronto Blue Jays	Right-handed pitcher	Oral Roberts University
10	298	Matt Gage	San Francisco Giants	Left-handed pitcher	Siena College
11	316	Dean Deetz	Houston Astros	Right-handed pitcher	Northeastern Oklahoma A&M College
11	324	Jake Latz*	Toronto Blue Jays	Pitcher	Lemont High School (IL)
11	326	Brandon Woodruff	Milwaukee Brewers	Pitcher	Mississippi State
11	331	John Means	Baltimore Orioles	Pitcher	West Virginia
12	356	Jordan Yamamoto	Milwaukee Brewers	Right-handed pitcher	Saint Louis School (HI)
12	362	Chris Gittens	New York Yankees	First baseman	Grayson College
13	404	Chandler Shepherd	Boston Red Sox	Right-handed pitcher	Kentucky
14	419	Justin Anderson	Los Angeles Angels	Right-handed pitcher	UTSA
14	420	Kevin Cron	Arizona Diamondbacks	First Baseman	TCU
15	449	Greg Mahle	Los Angeles Angels	Left-handed pitcher	UC Santa Barbara
16	466	Ramón Laureano	Houston Astros	Outfielder	Northeastern Oklahoma A&M
19	569	John Bormann*	Los Angeles Angels	Catcher	UTSA
19	572	Joe Harvey	New York Yankees	Pitcher	Pittsburgh
19	573	Scott Heineman*	Kansas City Royals	Outfielder	Oregon
19	583	Codey McElroy	Atlanta Braves	Shortstop	Cameron
22	650	Trevor Hildenberger	Minnesota Twins	Right-handed pitcher	California
22	656	Patrick Weigel*	Milwaukee Brewers	Right-handed pitcher	Oxnard College
22	659	Adam McCreery	Los Angeles Angels	Left-handed pitcher	Azusa Pacific
22	669	Bubby Rossman	Los Angeles Dodgers	Right-handed pitcher	Cal State Dominguez Hills
22	674	J. J. Matijevic*	Boston Red Sox	Shortstop	Norwin High School (PA)
23	692	Will Toffey*	New York Yankees	Third baseman	Salisbury School (CT)
25	740	Taylor Hearn*	Minnesota Twins	Left-handed pitcher	San Jacinto College
25	746	C. D. Pelham*	Milwaukee Brewers	Left-handed pitcher	Spartanburg Methodist College
25	753	Rudy Martin Jr.	Kansas City Royals	Outfielder	Lewisburg High School
26	785	Brennan Bernardino	Cincinnati Reds	Left-handed pitcher	Cal State Dominguez Hills
32	970	Locke St. John	Detroit Tigers	Left-handed pitcher	South Alabama
33	1006	Josh James	Houston Astros	Right-handed pitcher	Western Oklahoma State College
34	1020	Cory Hahn*	Arizona Diamondbacks	Outfielder	Arizona State
37	1105	Tristan Gray*	New York Mets	Second baseman	Elkins High School (TX)
37	1120	Patrick Mahomes*	Detroit Tigers	Right-handed pitcher	Whitehouse High School (TX)
38	1151	Paul DeJong*	Pittsburgh Pirates	Catcher	Illinois State
40	1208	Ryder Ryan*	Cleveland Indians	Right-handed pitcher	North Mecklenburg High School (NC)
40	1212	Bryson Brigman*	Oakland Athletics	Shortstop	Valley Christian High School (CA)

== Notes ==
Compensation picks

Traded picks

== See also ==
- List of first overall Major League Baseball draft picks
