= Josh Ockimey =

American baseball player (born 1995)

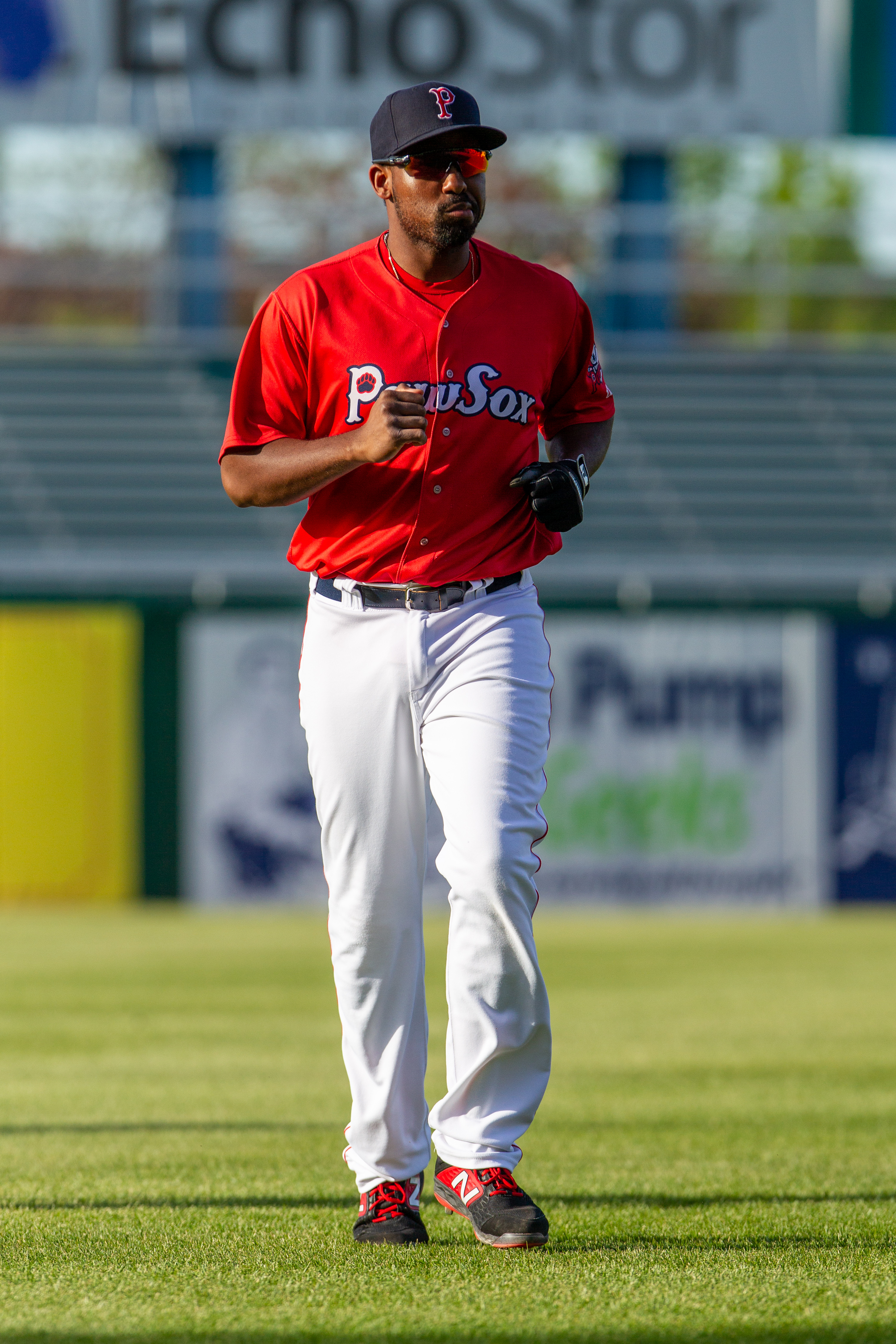
- Ockimey with the Pawtucket PawSox
- First baseman
- Born: October 18, 1995 (age 29); Philadelphia, Pennsylvania, U.S.
- Bats: Left Throws: Right

Joshua Michael Ockimey (born October 18, 1995) is an American former professional baseball first baseman. The Boston Red Sox selected him in the fifth round of the 2014 Major League Baseball draft.

== Playing career ==
=== Boston Red Sox ===
Ockimey attended Saints John Neumann and Maria Goretti Catholic High School. In his freshman year, he had a .466 batting average with 15 runs scored and 25 runs batted in (RBI), and was named The Philadelphia Inquirer's Southeastern Pennsylvania high school rookie of the year. He initially committed to attend the University of Arkansas, but changed his commitment to Indiana University Bloomington after Arkansas made personnel changes. As a senior, Ockimey batted .500 with 28 runs and 34 RBI. The Boston Red Sox selected him in the fifth round, with the 164th overall selection, of the 2014 Major League Baseball draft. He signed with the Red Sox rather than attend college.

Ockimey struggled in his professional debut, batting .188 in 36 games with the Gulf Coast Red Sox of the Rookie-level Gulf Coast League. Playing for the Lowell Spinners of the Low-A New York-Penn League in 2015, he batted .266 in 56 games. Ockimey spent the 2016 season with the Greenville Drive of the Single-A South Atlantic League where he posted a .226 batting average with 18 home runs and 62 RBI. He began the 2017 season with the Salem Red Sox of the High-A Carolina League, and was promoted to the Portland Sea Dogs of the Double-A Eastern League in August. He batted a combined .274 with 14 home runs and 74 RBI along with a .799 OPS between both teams.

Ockimey returned to Portland for the start of the 2018 season. In 90 games with the Sea Dogs, he batted .254 with 15 home runs and 56 RBI. On August 3, Ockimey was promoted to the Pawtucket Red Sox of the Triple-A International League, appearing in 27 games while batting .215 with five home runs and 15 RBI. Ockimey spent the 2019 season with Pawtucket, appearing in 122 games while batting .204 with 25 home runs and 57 RBI. Ockimey did not play in a game in 2020 due to the cancellation of minor league season because of the COVID-19 pandemic.

On December 22, 2020, Ockimey re-signed with the Red Sox on a minor league contract. He spent the 2021 season with the Triple-A Worcester Red Sox, batting .225 with 15 home runs and 45 RBI in 98 games.

=== Philadelphia Phillies ===
On February 15, 2022, Ockimey signed a minor league contract with the Philadelphia Phillies organization. Ockimey split the 2022 season between the Double-A Reading Fightin Phils and Triple-A Lehigh Valley IronPigs, playing in 118 games and hitting a cumulative .230/.367/.423 with 17 home runs and 55 RBI. He elected free agency following the season on November 10.

== Post-playing career ==
On February 1, 2023, Ockimey announced his retirement from professional baseball, and joined the Boston Red Sox organization as part of their professional scouting department.

== Personal life ==
Ockimey has a twin brother, Michael, who plays college football as a linebacker for Thaddeus Stevens Community College. He has a tattoo on his arm of Romans 8:31.
